= Ancient gates of Benin Kingdom =

The ancient gates of Benin Kingdom were the nine access point into the Kingdom of Benin, in what is today known as Benin City. The city is known to be surrounded by wide inner walls made of earthwork and moats. In the 1974 edition of the Guinness Book of Records, it described the Benin City walls as the largest earthwork carried out before the Mechanical period. Part of the walls were believed to be about 65 ft (20 m) tall. The ancient walls in the Benin Kingdom were transformed to the access point or gates to the city. These gates include Iya Uzebu, Iya Osuan, Iya Urh'Ogba, Iya Ivbiyeneva, Iya Uhunmwun Idunmwun, Iya Akpakpava or Iya Ok'Edo, Iya Ewaise, Iya Ero, and Iya Isekhere.

== See also ==
- List of the Ogiso
- Kingdom of Benin
- Oba of Benin
