= Ughoton =

- Location in Nigeria
- Coordinates: 6°10′N 5°22′E
- Country: Nigeria
- State: Edo State
- Climate: Am

Ughoton (or Gwato) is a town in Nigeria's Edo State.

According to Benin oral tradition, the town was reportedly founded as 'Iguekaladerhan' (the land of Ekaladerhan) by Ekaladerhan, the son of Owodo, the last Benin ogiso (monarch). At the time of Owodo's exile for misadministration, Ekaladerhan had fled Owodo, who wanted to sacrifice him to the gods. Reports of Ekaladerhan's location reached Owodo after he was spotted by hunters, and he sent soldiers to capture him. When they arrived, Ekaladerhan was gone, and the soldiers and hunters remained where they were, forming the town rather than returning to face Owodo's wrath.

In the fifteenth century, Ughoton began to function as a port city for nearby Benin City, first hosting the Portuguese, and later the English and Dutch traders. The famous explorer Giovanni Belzoni, known for his success in searching for Egyptian antiquities and selling them to the British Museum, died here in 1823 of dysentery during an expedition.

There is another Ughoton town in Okpe Local Government area of Delta State, which is made up of Urhobo-Okpe speaking people. Like the Urhobos this Ughoton people are migrants from Benin and share a unique language with other Okpes who together occupy two of the 25 local governments of Delta State. Ughoton borders the creeks with a rich flow of rivers and streams through the town. Its southern neighbours are the Itsekiris of Orere and Omadino. To the north are Jeddo and Ugbokodo, two Okpe villages.

== Sources ==
{http://www.edofabble.com/html/fabbleofedo.history} History of the Edo folk
