= Igodomigodo =

Name of the Ancient Benin Kingdom

- c. 900–c. 1180
- Capital: Udo, Ugbekun, Benin City
- Common languages: Edo
- Government: Monarchy
- Ogiso
  - 900s: Igodo (first)
  - ?-1180: Owodo (last)
- History
  - Established: c. 900
  - Ogiso monarchy replaced by the Oba monarchy: c. 1180
Succeeded by
Kingdom of Benin
- Today part of: Nigeria

Igodomigodo was an ancient Edo kingdom in modern-day southern Nigeria ruled by the Ogiso monarchy.

== History ==
=== Legendary origins ===
The Edo tradition of origin holds that initially there was no land on earth. Accordingly, Osanobua (Note: Hans Joachim Melzian, in his A Concise Dictionary Of The Bini Language Of Southern Nigeria (1937), notes Osanobua and Odudua as synonymous names for the same 'High God'.) requested three sons to descend from the sky in a canoe. One son, named Igodo, created land by pouring sand contained in a snail shell on the water, and Osanobua made him king of the Edo and of the world. Some traditions say Igodo was thought to have come from the sky due to his great wisdom. Ogiso hence means "king from the sky".

=== Early history ===
Relying on other traditions and archaeological evidence, historians believe that the Edo migrated into Igodogomido from the northeast in the second half of the first millennium CE, intermarrying with the local Efa people and gradually assimilating them to their culture. Some traditions claim that they stayed temporarily at Ile-Ife before settling their present-day homeland.

In Jacob Egharevba's first edition of A Short History of Benin (1934), he says the first Ogiso, Obagodo (Igodo), was the eldest son of Oduduwa. His second edition changed to have the Ogiso as having migrated from Egypt, likely influenced by the Hamitic hypothesis.

=== Formation of the state ===
The process by which the various autonomous Edo and Efa villages developed politically is unclear. Prior to the consolidation of the kingdom, settlements were ruled by Uzama (lineage heads), who would later fulfil the role of kingmakers in Igodomigodo. A prominent village leader named Igodo became Ogiso, or king, sometime in the 10th century CE, likely as a result of a long process of competition between communities. The General History of Africa recorded the Ogiso as a native dynasty to the Edo. Based on early oral sources, Dmitri Bondarenko has argued that Udo, a town located northwest of present-day Benin City, was the first capital of the Ogiso. According to his theory, this Yoruba city-state was a part of the Ife Empire, and a base from which Yoruba invaders conquered the territory, bringing the institution of divine kingship with them. Some historians have Igodo ruling from Ugbekun, a village southeast of Benin city, where he died.

Regardless of his origins, Ogiso Igodo united various chiefdoms and communities into a single political entity. His efforts to integrate various Bini chiefdoms and promote unity among the people were crucial in consolidating the kingdom. Under Igodo's rule, the kingdom experienced growth and development. He implemented administrative and social reforms that facilitated governance of the unified territory. Igodo's reign saw the beginning of important cultural and religious practices that remained important for centuries, particularly the divine kingship.

=== Height ===
Ogiso Ere, the son of Igodo, succeeded his father and worked to further consolidate the kingdom. According to Egharevba, Ere introduced cultural and technological advancements, including the royal throne (ekete), rectangular stool (agba), and round leather fan (ezuzu) through the establishment of Onwina and Igbesanmwan, traditional groups of carpenters and carvers. These attributions are simply copied from the later Oba Ewuare I, however; the two rulers are often conflated in oral tradition. Ere also moved the palace from Ugbekun to Benin.

Queens such as Emose and Orhorho were also significant figures. Emose was involved in governance, while Orhorho's rule was marked by conflict. Orhorho's oppressive reign ultimately led to her demise. Ogiso Odoligie and Ogiso Uwa expanded the kingdom's influence and integrated various chiefdoms. Their reigns focused on strengthening the kingdom's political and cultural institutions. Ogiso Henenden's rule brought stability and growth to the region, resulting in a significant population increase in Benin City.

=== Fall ===
The decline of the Ogiso monarchy began with the reign of its last ruler, Ogiso Owodo in the late 12th century. His tenure was marked by internal conflicts, public discontent, ineffective leadership, and a loss of authority and control. Domestic problems, including the barrenness of his wives and the banishment of his only son, Ekaladerhan, further weakened him.

Owodo was eventually overthrown by the people of the city. In his place they chose Evian, a popular and powerful Ogifa (Note: Traditional ruler of the Efa community.) as okaevbo or head of state. Evian's attempt to pass power to his son Ogiamwen, creating a new royal dynasty, was resisted. The Edionevbo (the ruling council of Uzama) refused to sanction the move, and sent emissaries requesting that a prince of Ile-Ife restore order and legitimacy to their throne. Oranmiyan, son of Oduduwa, accepted the council's invitation. Some modern Edo traditions claim that the first Oba, and perhaps Oduduwa himself, was in fact the prince Ekaladerhan, but this has been widely criticised by historians. (Note: For more information, see Ogiso monarchy) Prince Oranmiyan married an Edo woman and had a son called Eweka. Some Edo opposed being ruled by an outsider, and, conscious of this (or possibly after conflict), Oranmiyan returned to Ife. In accordance with Oranmiyan's final order, Eweka took the throne, founding the Oba dynasty of the nascent Kingdom of Benin.

== Government and society ==
The Ogiso were key figures in administering the kingdom, overseeing both political and religious affairs. The capital, perhaps initially located at Udo, was later moved to Benin City, which became the political and cultural center.

The social structure of the Ogiso monarchy was hierarchical, with clear roles and responsibilities among the classes. At the top was the Ogiso, holding supreme authority as both a political and religious leader. The Ogiso was supported by a council of chiefs and nobles who were responsible for justice, taxation, and military matters. Chiefs were appointed to oversee different regions, ensuring effective control over the territory. The council also advised the Ogiso on important state matters and served as a link between the central authority and local communities.The Ogiso exercised judicial authority, resolving disputes and ensuring justice within the kingdom. The judicial system was based on customary laws and practices, upheld by the Ogiso and appointed officials. Under the Ogiso, towns were headed by enigie (princes or chiefs) and paid tribute to the Ogiso. Towns were surrounded by earthen walls, which likely demarcated territory rather than serving a defensive purpose. Its economy was mostly agricultural.

The social structure included skilled artisans and craftsmen who contributed to the kingdom's economy and cultural development. These individuals were organised into guilds, such as the Onwina (carpenters) and Igbesanmwan (carvers). Their work was integral to the kingdom's religious and cultural practices, producing items used in rituals and daily life. The common people formed the majority of the population, engaging in occupations such as farming, fishing, and trade.

Slavery was also part of the social structure, with slaves performing labour-intensive tasks. Slaves were often captured during wars and raids or acquired through trade. They were considered the property of their owners and had limited rights and freedoms. However, slaves could sometimes earn their freedom through exceptional service or by being granted manumission.

== Religion ==
Religious practices were integral to the kingdom's administration, with the Ogiso viewed as divine rulers mediating between the spiritual and physical worlds. This divine status was reinforced through rituals and ceremonies emphasising the sacred nature of kingship. Temples and shrines dedicated to various deities played central roles in religious life, with the Ogiso performing rituals to various gods to ensure prosperity and well-being. This status was reflected in the title "Ogiso," meaning "king from the sky". Mythology and oral traditions shaped the people's belief systems. Legends and myths about the origins of the Ogiso and their divine lineage were passed down through generations, reinforcing the sacred nature of kingship. Belief in the Ogiso's supernatural powers and their connection to the gods strengthened their authority as rulers.

The ancestor cult was also significant, with rituals honouring deceased ancestors and seeking their guidance. The religious and mythological practices during the Ogiso period laid the foundation for the Benin Kingdom's spiritual and cultural identity. Many of these practices evolved and were integrated into the subsequent Oba Dynasty's religious framework. These practices' enduring significance is evident in the cultural traditions and ceremonies observed by the Edo people today.

== Culture ==
The Ogiso monarchy is known for its contributions to the arts and crafts, which were significant in the kingdom's cultural development. Skilled craftsmen and artisans emerged during this period, producing intricate works of art, including wood carvings and bronze sculptures. Ogiso Ere's reign in particular saw the establishment of groups of craftsmen, such as the Onwina (carpenters) and Igbesanmwan (carvers). Bronze casting was another significant art form that flourished during the Ogiso period. The lost-wax casting technique created detailed bronze sculptures and plaques depicting various aspects of the kingdom's life, including portraits of rulers, deities, and important events.

The artistic heritage of the Ogiso monarchy is evident in the architectural achievements of the period. The construction of town walls, particularly those of Udo, showcases the kingdom's architectural skill. These walls were functional for defence and reflected the kingdom's cultural and artistic achievements.

== See also ==
- Ogiso monarchy
- List of the Ogiso
- Kingdom of Benin
