= Description of Africa =

Description of Africa, as a book title, may refer to:

- Description of Africa (1550 book) by Giovanni Battista Ramusio, published in Italian
- Description of Africa (1668 book) by Olfert Dapper, published in Dutch
