= Unidentified flag from the Kingdom of Benin =

Unidentified flag of West African origin

- Use: Banner national flag
- Proportion: 1:2
- Design: A red banner charged with two white figures, the one to the hoist decapitating the one to the right with a sword.
- Designed by: Unknown

An unidentified West African flag was brought to Britain after the Benin Expedition of 1897 against the Kingdom of Benin. Debate exists over the origin of the flag, including which West African people created it. The flag has been considered to be possibly of Itsekiri origin.

== History ==
Dean Nicholas of History Today writes that "little is known of the flag's origins or meaning, nor even if it belonged to or was used by the Kingdom of Benin, though it is believed to be of Itsekri origin." According to the Royal Museums Greenwich, which has the flag in the National Maritime Museum's collection, it was brought to Britain by Royal Navy officer Francis William Kennedy who was part of the punitive expedition against the Kingdom of Benin in 1897.

A digital depiction of the flag

The flag is located at the National Maritime Museum in Greenwich, London, where as of 2022 it is not on display. The Museum description says the flag is "probably Itsekri", and that "the Itsekri people acted as middle men between the Edo people of Benin in the interior and the Europeans on the coast."

The Benin expedition was launched in reprisal against an attack on a British mission in the service of Niger Coast Protectorate by forces of the Oba of Benin. It was a combined naval and military operation under the command of Rear-Admiral Harry Holdsworth Rawson C.B. with local troops and carriers. The towns of Guato and Sapobar were attacked by detached forces while the main part of the expedition marched on Benin. The town was captured and accidentally burnt. Oba Overami, was exiled to Calabar where he died in 1914. The famous Benin bronzes were removed as reparations by the British.

Since at least 2009, the flag has attracted attention for its unusual and highly distinctive graphic design.

The National Maritime Museum holds a personal flag of Itsekiri chief and trader Nana Olomu which was also recovered by F. W. Kennedy.
