= List of the Ogiso =

Ogiso is the name used by the people of Igodomigodo or (Ugodomigodo) to refer to the institution and first dynasty of rulers beginning approximately around 900–950 AD or the mid tenth century. The name variously translates to mean 'King from the sky', 'King of the sky', or 'King of heaven'. Broken down, the word is coined from the article pieces -Ogie; the Edo word for king, and -Iso; the Edo word for sky. Early traditions narrate that these early kings (Ogie) descended from heaven. The first of them, Igodo (or Obagodo), is believed to have been a stranger from the sky because of his immense wisdom. Not much is known about the reign of the Ogisos compared to the era of the Obas, and the period is often said to be of a semi-mythical or legendary nature.

The exact number of Ogisos that reigned have varied since the inception of written Benin history. Ademola Iyi-Eweka records a list of fifteen Ogisos ending with Owodo in 1998. Before him, pioneer Edo historian Jacob U. Egharevba had recorded a varying number of Ogisos in different editions of his popular and widely celebrated work; A Short History of Benin. However, In his fourth and final edition published in 1968, the Ogisos had eventually settled on fifteen in number with their names and functions detailed.

Since the earlier authors, another Benin writer S.B Omoregie (1997) has developed the list to 31 Ogisos and furnished all thirty one with names and precise dates of rule. Although he doesn't explain or account for how he arrived at the dates ascribed to each ruler, his publication keeps the time period of the Ogiso dynasty within the established timeline (900 CE – 1130 CE) and it includes very detailed information on the lives and times of some of the rulers. Chief Osemwegie-Ero (2003) maintained the list of 31 Ogisos but backdates the beginning of the dynasty to 40 BCE instead. He also used precise dates for the reigns of each member in his publication and doesn't explain how the two introduced date novelties were concluded. His work was published to mark the centenary of the Benin Expedition, 1897–1997.

The next twenty anteceding Ogisos starting with Akhuankhuan were not chosen based on consanguinity (blood relationship) but on personal abilities. Eventually however, the dynastic transmission model seem to have been restored again for the reign of the last eight members. Common to most of the lists are the first three rulers, starting with Obagodo (the pioneer), Ere (the second and most revered) and Orire (the third ruler). Udo is believed by a segment of the Edo population to have been the first capital of the land and that Igodo first descended from the sky and governed Udo for twenty five years before moving to Benin, while others yet believe the original site of Igodo's palace was situated in Ugbekun.

The Ogiso were assisted by a group of seven nobles called the Uzama. During the reign of Ogisos, Edo lands were called 'Igodomigodo' and they had administrative centers or capitals Udo, Ugbekun, and later on Ore-Edo now Benin City. Many observers have described the system of government in Igodomigodo as one best described as a Supra-chiefdom or Complex chiefdom, and the line of rulers were not an actual dynasty in the real sense. Community autonomy was given to each community by the Ogiso during their reign.

== List of the Ogiso, Egharevba 1933–1968 ==
Below is a consolidated list of Ogisos that reigned in Benin which appear in all of Egharevba's works from the first to the fourth and final edition. He lists his informants and sources in his book.

Name	Reign
Ogiso Igodo (Obagodo)	c..900AD
Ogiso Ere	–
Ogiso Orire	–
Ogiso Akhuankhuan	–
Ogiso Ekpigho	–
Ogiso Oria	–
Ogiso Emose	–
Ogiso Orhorho	–
Ogiso Oriagba	–
Ogiso Odoligie	–
Ogiso Uwa	–
Ogiso Heneden	–
Ogiso Obioye	–
Ogiso Arigho	–
Ogiso Owodo	c..1100s

== Alternative list of the Ogiso, S.B Omoregie 1997 ==
This is an alternative list of Ogisos that reigned in Benin based on the work of chief S.B Omoregie. The period for the reign of the Ogiso monarchy is placed between c.900 AD and 1130 AD with thirty one Ogisos listed. He does not explain how the dates for the reigning period of each Ogiso was arrived at. (Note: Osemwegie-Ero, a local Edo historian, presents a similar list to Omoregie however puts 40 BCE as the start date for the thirty-one Ogiso, and also doesn't explain the dating of their reigns. It diverges dramatically from the general scholarly consensus of the start date being around the 10th century CE.)

Name	Reign
Ogiso Igodo	900–925
Ogiso Ere	925–960
Ogiso Orire "The Young"	960–1000
Ogiso Odia	1000–1001
Ogiso Ighido	1001–1002
Ogiso Evbobo	1002–1005
Ogiso Ogbeide "The proud eagle"	1005
Ogiso Emehen "The oraculist"	1005–1009
Ogiso Akhuankhuan	1009–1011
Ogiso Ekpigho	1011
Ogiso Efeseke	1012–1019
Ogiso Irudia	1019
Ogiso Odion	1020
Ogiso Etebowe	1020–1022
Ogiso Imarhan	1023–1024
Ogiso Orria	1024–1025
Ogiso Emose (Possibly female)	1026–1029
Ogiso Ororo (Possibly female)	1029–1030
Ogiso Irrebo	1030–1036
Ogiso Ogbomo	1036–1040
Ogiso Agbonzeke	1040–1044
Ogiso Ediae	1044–1050
Ogiso Orriagba	1050–1070
Ogiso Odoligie	1070–1085
Ogiso Uwa	1085–1095
Ogiso Ehenneden	1095–1110
Ogiso Ohuede	1110–1112
Ogiso Oduwa	1112–1119
Ogiso Obioye	1119–1121
Ogiso Arigho	1121–1125
Ogiso Owodo	1125–1130
