= Eguavoen =

Eguavoen is a Nigerian surname referring to the Royal Palace of the Oba of Benin located in Benin City, the capital city of Edo State. In the Edo language, the meaning of this name is "The palace (Egua) is filled up". Notable people with the surname include :

- Augustine Eguavoen (born 1965), Nigerian footballer and manager
- Sam Eguavoen (born 1993), American-born player of Canadian football
