= Ogiso Igodo =

First King of Igodomigodo

Igodo (Obagodo) was the first King of Igodomigodo.

According to Ife and early Benin tradition, he was one of the sons of Oduduwa who dispersed from Ife to found various kingdoms. Some Edo traditions say Igodo descended from heaven, others claim he came from the sky due to his great wisdom, hence his title Ogiso, meaning "King from the sky".

During his reign, he organized the kingdom’s administration, introduced new political structures, and reinforced the connection between Igodomigodo and the broader Yoruba civilization. There are also stories that describe the Ogiso traveling to Ife for festivals, further strengthening the ties between the two regions. His leadership laid the foundation for the later transformation of Igodomigodo into the Benin Kingdom, which grew into one of the most powerful kingdoms in West Africa. Igodo’s legacy is preserved in the historical narratives of both the Edo and Yoruba people. His rule signified the early formation of the Benin monarchy, which would later be formally restructured under Eweka I who officially established the Oba of Benin monarchy.
