= Uzama =

Branch of Government of the Kingdom of Benin

The Uzama Nihiron, also known as kingmakers in the Benin Kingdom, are among the highest ranking chiefs in Benin history. Just like the Oyo Mesi of the old Oyo empire, the Uzama are saddled with the responsibility of crowning a new king in the Benin kingdom (modern day Benin City). From ancient Benin history, the Uzama reign started during the Ogiso era and they consist of a group of five chiefs which is headed by Chief Oliha. Other chiefs holding the Uzama title include Edohen, Ezomo, Ero, Eholo Nire and Oloton. While the chiefs were responsible for crowning the king, or the Oba of Benin, they do not have the power to choose him.

== See also ==
- Kingdom of Benin
- Oba of Benin
- List of the Ogiso
