= Ohuede =

Ohuede was a ruler of Igodomigodo and the founder of the Ohuede dynasty.
