= Ogiso monarchy =

Ruling dynasty of Igodomigodo

- Royal house
- Country: Igodomigodo
- Current region: Nigeria
- Founded: 10th century CE
- Founder: Igodo
- Final ruler: Owodo
- Seat: Benin City
- Historic seat: Udo
- Titles: Ogiso
- Dissolution: c. 1100 CE

The Ogiso were the earliest known ruling monarchy of the Edo kingdom of Igodomigodo, founded by Igodo, the first Ogiso. The monarchy began around 900 AD and lasted until the early 12th century when it was succeeded by the Oba monarchy. The Ogiso monarchy influenced the early sociopolitical structure of the region by introducing centralised governance and laying the foundations for the Benin Empire.

Throughout its existence, the Ogiso monarchy had thirty-one rulers and notable among them were Ogiso Igodo, the first ruler, and Ogiso Ere, who implemented several administrative and cultural reforms. This era saw the establishment of settlements, the integration of various chiefdoms, and the growth of proto-urban centers, with Udo and Benin City being prominent examples.

The decline of the Ogiso monarchy began with the rule of the last Ogiso, Owodo, whose reign was marked by internal conflict and public dissatisfaction. This led to his banishment and a period of interregnum, during which the nobleman Evian attempted to establish his own line of succession. However, the people eventually rejected this, inviting a prince from Ife to restore order, thus beginning the Oba monarchy. The legacy of the Ogiso monarchy remains in the cultural and historical consciousness of the Benin people, reflected in their traditions, folklore, and archaeological findings.

== History ==
=== Origin and establishment ===
There are two competing Edo traditions of origin. One tradition holds that initially there was no land on earth. Accordingly, Osanobua (God) requested three sons to descend from the sky in a canoe. One son, named Igodo, created land by pouring sand on the water, and Osanobua made him king of the Edo and of the world. (Note: Some traditions say Igodo was thought to have come from the sky due to his great wisdom.) Ogiso hence means "king from the sky". Conversely, the other tradition claims the Edo migrated from the northeast around 1000 CE, (Note: Some traditions say that a people from the grasslands of the Sudan came south on horseback, fleeing Islam, to intermarry with the Edo around 1000 CE.) and after a temporary stay at Ile-Ife, settled their present-day homeland. According to oral tradition and historical records, the Ogisos were regarded as divine rulers.

The establishment of the Ogiso monarchy marked the beginning of a centralised political structure in the region now known as Benin. Igodo, the first Ogiso, played a role in laying the foundations for the kingdom's administrative and political systems. He governed various Bini chiefdoms and communities, integrating them into a cohesive entity.

Based on early oral sources, Dmitri Bondarenko considers the settlement of Udo, located northwest of present-day Benin City, to have been the initial capital of the Ogiso, and to have been a Yoruba city-state. Thus he considers Igodo to have been a Yoruba chief who conquered the Edo, and this how the institution of kingship came to the Edo. He only considers the first three Ogiso to have been Yoruba.

=== The Reign of Ogiso Igodo ===
Ogiso Igodo, the first king of the Ogiso monarchy, played a key role in establishing the early Benin Kingdom. His reign marked the beginning of centralised governance, uniting various chiefdoms and communities under a single political entity. Igodo's leadership is often associated with semi-mythical qualities, emphasising his perceived divine origin as a "king from the sky."

His efforts to integrate various Bini chiefdoms and promote unity among the people were crucial in consolidating the kingdom. Under Igodo's rule, the kingdom experienced growth and development. He implemented administrative and social reforms that facilitated governance of the unified territory. These reforms included the establishment of proto-urban centers and the introduction of practices that would later be integral to the Benin Kingdom.

Historical records and oral traditions provide insights into Igodo's contributions, despite the mythical elements of his rule. His leadership emphasised diplomacy and the incorporation of diverse cultural elements into the kingdom's administration.

Igodo's reign also saw the beginnings of important cultural practices and religious observances that continued to be significant in the Benin Kingdom. The concept of divine kingship, where the ruler was seen as a mediator between the people and the spiritual world, became a central aspect of Ogiso governance.

The Ogiso monarchy experienced the reign of many influential kings and queens including Ogiso Igodo, Ere, Orire, Akhuankhuan, Ekpigho, Oria, Emose, Orhorho, Oriagba, Odoligie, Uwa, Ehenenden, Obioye, Arigho, and Owodo.

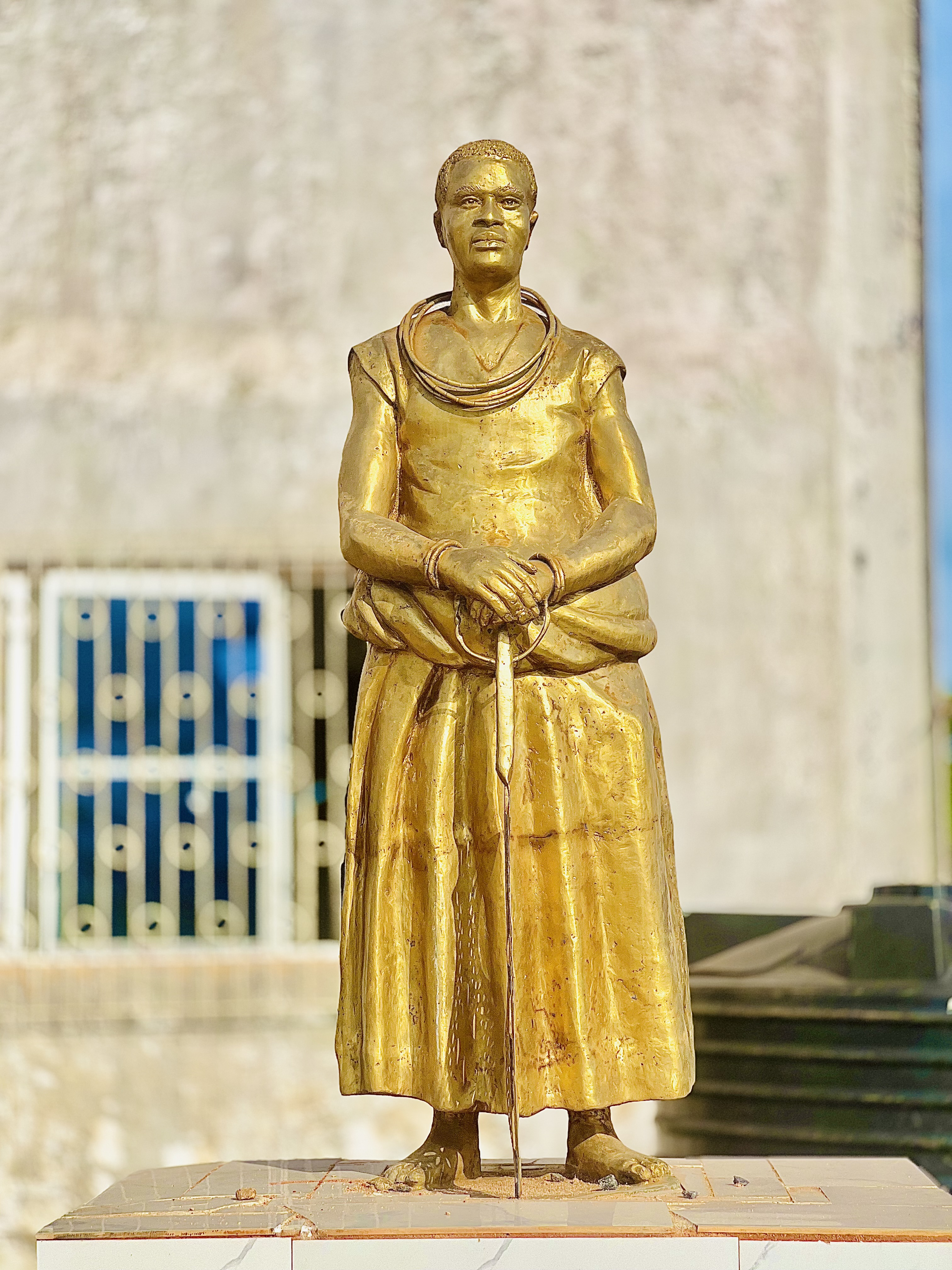
Ekaladerhan (also spelt as Ikhaladerhan), the son of Owodo

=== Decline and transition ===
The decline of the Ogiso monarchy began with the reign of its last ruler, Ogiso Owodo. His tenure was marked by internal conflicts, public discontent, and a series of events that led to his downfall. Owodo struggled to address the kingdom's issues, leading to a loss of authority and control. Domestic problems, including the barrenness of his wives and the banishment of his only son, Ekaladerhan, further weakened his power.

Owodo was eventually overthrown by the people of the city. In his place they chose Evian, a popular and powerful Ogifa, earth-priest and chief of the native Efa people, as okaevbo or head of state. The decline of the Ogiso monarchy resulted in a power vacuum and chaos within the kingdom. The lack of central authority and continued conflicts among the nobility exacerbated the situation, testing the kingdom's unity and stability. Evian's attempt to pass power to his son Ogiamwen, creating a new royal dynasty, was resisted. The Edionevbo (ruling council) refused to sanction the move, and sent emissaries requesting that a prince of Ile-Ife restore order and legitimacy to their throne.

Historical traditions in Benin diverge on the details of these events. The 'official' tradition records that Oranmiyan, son of Oduduwa, accepted the council's invitation; his arrival marked the beginning of the new dynasty and the establishment of the title "Oba" for the rulers of Benin. Oranmiyan's acceptance of the throne was seen as a continuation of the divine and legitimate lineage that the people of Benin desired. His rule brought a renewed sense of stability and order to the kingdom, ending the period of turmoil that had characterised the final years of the Ogiso monarchy.

Another tradition, first recorded in the 1970s, provides a different backstory. While several versions exist, they all argue that the founding Oba was not a Yoruba but was instead either Ekaladerhan or his son, natives of Benin who were in exile in Ife. Some go further, claiming that Ekaladerhan and Oduduwa are the same person, and therefore that the Edo were responsible for the foundation or organization of Ile-Ife. Historians generally see these alternative accounts as recent inventions or distortions of older historical traditions in response to the dynamics of modern Nigerian society.

== Cultural and societal impact ==
The period of the Ogiso monarchy is considered a time of social creation and development. Archaeological evidence and oral traditions provide insights into this era. The dynasty saw the emergence of proto-urban centers and the integration of various cultural and social practices that would later influence the development of the Benin Kingdom. The reign of the Ogiso is characterised by the establishment of cultural and religious practices, some of which continue to be observed in modern Benin.

Religion and mythology were central to the Ogiso monarchy, shaping the cultural and societal framework of the kingdom. The Ogiso were considered divine rulers, intermediaries between the spiritual and physical realms. This status was reflected in the title "Ogiso," meaning "king from the sky". Religious practices during the Ogiso period involved worshiping various deities and performing rituals to ensure the kingdom's prosperity.

The Ogiso monarchy is known for its contributions to the arts and crafts, which were significant in the kingdom's cultural development. Skilled craftsmen and artisans emerged during this period, producing intricate works of art, including wood carvings and bronze sculptures.

== See also ==
- List of the Ogiso
