= David van Nyendael =

Envoy of the Netherlands to the Ashanti Empire
- In office 9 October 1701 – 12 October 1702

Personal details
- Born: 1667 Golkonda, Dutch Coromandel
- Died: 20 October 1702 (aged 35) Elmina, Dutch Gold Coast

David van Nyendael, also van Nijendael (1667 – 20 October 1702), was a Dutch merchant and diplomat in the service of the Dutch West India Company, and stationed at the Dutch Gold Coast.

== Biography ==
David van Nyendael was born in Golkonda, India, to Jan van Nyendael, a Dutch East India Company employee in Dutch Coromandel, and Barbara de Wit, who, despite her Dutch name, was a local Indian woman. Jan van Nyendael had joined the Dutch East India Company as an apprentice sailor, but managed to climb the ranks to become chief of the Golkonda factory, probably helped by his talent for languages—aside from his native Dutch, he spoke Portuguese, Persian, Hindi, and a local language. Barbara died on 6 July 1677, and Jan died on 28 November 1682, making David van Nyendael an orphan at age 15.

After the death of his father, David van Nyendael left for the Dutch Republic, where he was received by his family, probably his uncle Gosvinus van Nyendael. Some time at the end of the seventeenth century, Van Nyendael employed himself at the Dutch West India Company. As there is no registration of Van Nyendael's application in the minutes of the Amsterdam chamber of the Dutch West India Company, he probably joined the company at the lower rank of assistant or provisional assistant.

Van Nyendael was installed as sub-factor, employed on ships sailing West Africa to ensure smooth barter trade with local peoples. During his second voyage to Benin, he visited the king of Benin in Benin City. His detailed description of this journey was included as an appendix to Willem Bosman's Nauwkeurige beschrijving van de Guinese Goud- Tand- en Slavekust (1703). His description of the kingdom remains valuable as one of the earliest detailed descriptions of Benin.

=== Envoy to the Ashanti Empire ===
The Battle of Feyiase (1701) brought great changes in the power relations of the native African peoples on the Gold Coast. The Ashanti had defeated the Denkyira, with whom the Dutch were previously allied, and with whom they traded weapons. In an effort to improve relations with the Ashanti, Director-General Joan van Sevenhuysen sent Van Nyendael to the Ashanti court on 9 October 1701. Carrying gifts such as a plume hat, two gold plated mirrors, the latest European haute couture, and gold plated leather, Van Nyendael proposed to Ashanti king Osei Kofi Tutu I to trade directly with the Dutch.

Meanwhile, Willem de la Palma had replaced Van Sevenhuysen as Director-General in June 1702. De la Palma did not understand the rationale for Van Nyendael's mission, and called him back to Elmina. Van Nyendael returned to Elmina on 12 October 1702, but was fatally ill. He died eight days later, not able to write a report about his mission.

== Legacy ==
Although not very successful, Van Nyendael's visit marked the beginning of the Ashanti-Dutch alliance. For this reason, the 300 year anniversary of diplomatic ties between Ghana and the Netherlands was celebrated in 2002, with Dutch Crown Prince Willem-Alexander and his wife Máxima visiting Ghana between 14 and 17 April, and with Ashanti king Otumfuo Nana Osei Tutu II visiting the Netherlands in June.
