= Royal Palace of the Oba of Benin =

Palace of the Oba of Benin

Coordinates: 6°19′56″N 5°37′12″E

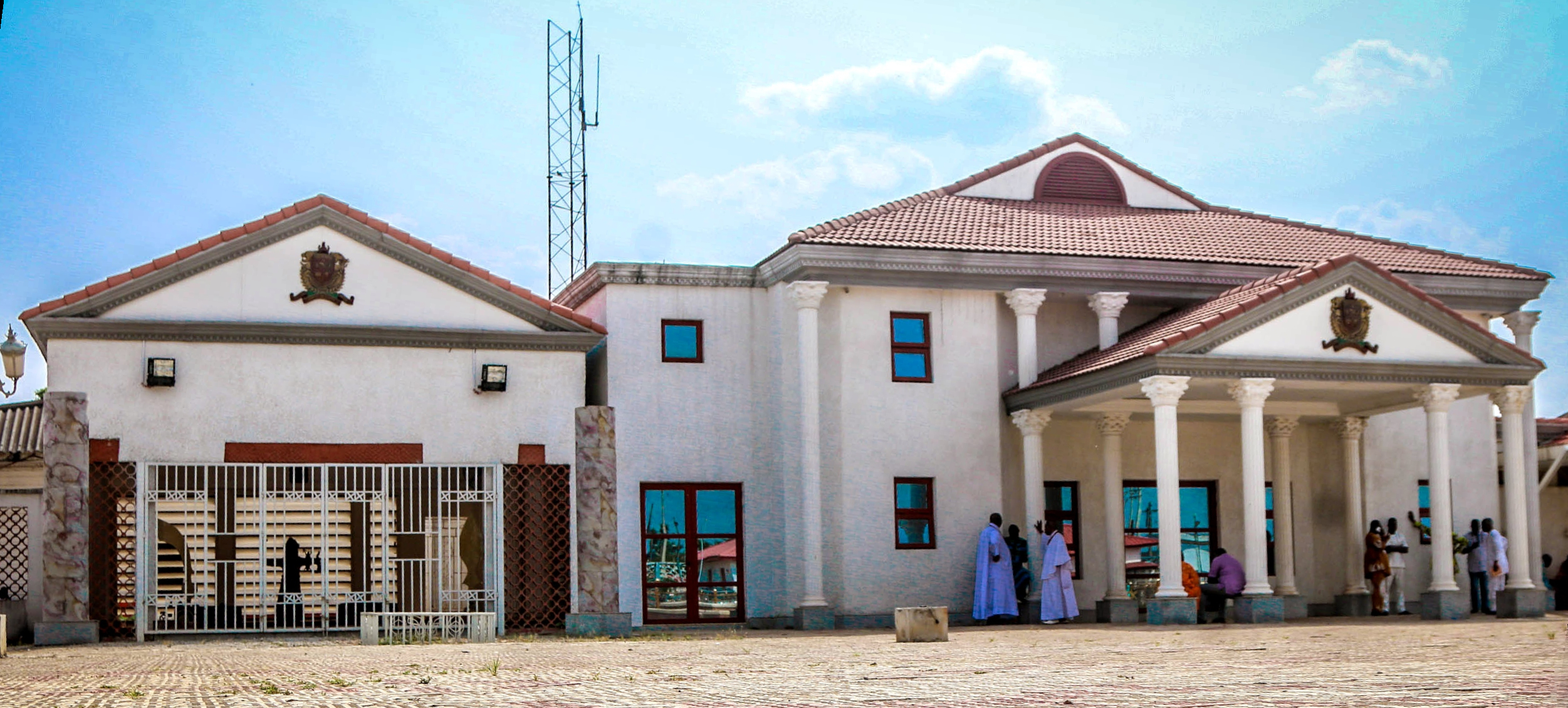
Royal Palace of the Oba of Benin.

The Royal Palace of the Oba of Benin, located in Benin City, Nigeria, is notable as the home of the Oba of Benin and other royals.

The original palace, built by Oba Ewedo (1255–1280), was located at the heart of ancient City of Benin. A new palace was built by Oba Eweka II (1914–1932) after the original building was destroyed during the 1897 war with the British.

The palace is known for once housing the Benin Bronzes.

The Royal Palace of Oba of Benin is a celebration and preservation of the rich Benin culture. Most of the visitors to the palace are curators, archaeologists or historians.

"The king's palace or court is a square, and is as large as the town of Haarlem and entirely surrounded by a special wall, like that which encircles the town. It is divided into many magnificent palaces, houses, and apartments of the courtiers, and comprises beautiful and long square galleries...resting on wooden pillars, from top to bottom covered with cast copper, on which are engraved the pictures of their war exploits and battles, and are kept very clean."

— Olfert Dapper, a Dutch writer, describing Benin in his book Description of Africa (1668)

== See also ==
- Oba of Benin
- Benin Kingdom
- Benin City
