= Owodo =

Ogiso of Igodomigodo from c. 1125 to c. 1130

- 31st Ogiso, Monarch of Igodomigodo
- Issue: Ikaladerhan
- House: Ohuede dynasty
- Father: Arigho
- Religion: Traditional Edo religion

Owodo (r. 1125–1130, d. c. 1133) was the thirty-first Ogiso ('King') of the pre-imperial Benin kingdom of Igodomigodo and the last ruler of the Ohuede dynasty, succeeding his father, Arigho.

Owodo Ohuede dynasty Born: ? Died: 1133
Regnal titles
Preceded by Arigho	Ogiso of Igodomigodo c. 1125 – c. 1130	Vacant Deposed Title next held by Eweka I as Oba
