= Jacob Egharevba =

Nigerian historian (1893–1980)

Jacob Uwadiae Egharevba
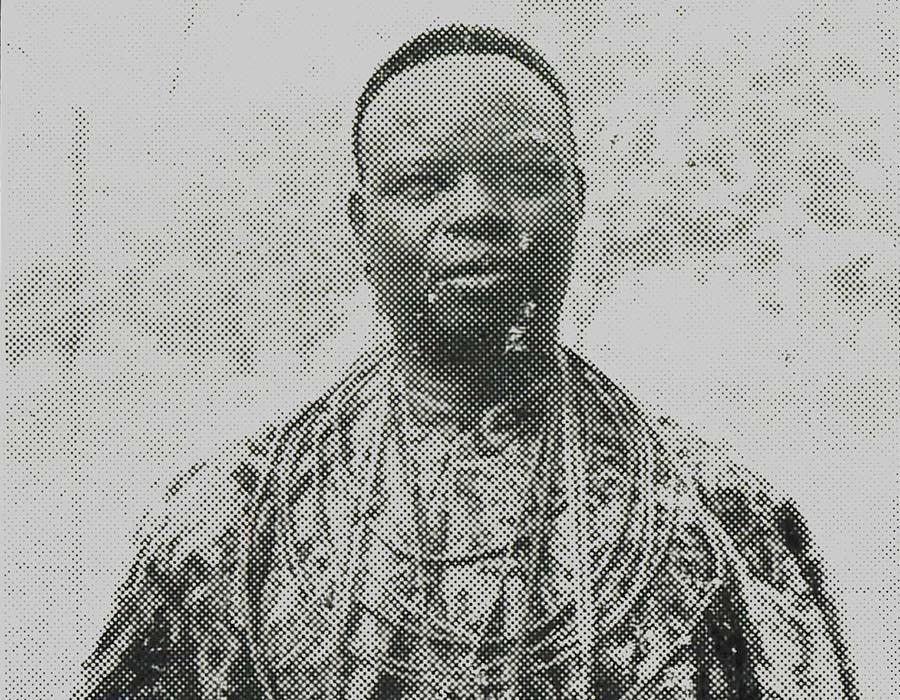
- Born: 1893; Idanre
- Died: 1980 (aged 86–87); Benin City
- Citizenship: Nigerian
- Known for: Benin history
- Notable work: A Short History of Benin, Pioneer curator, Benin Royal Museum

Chief Jacob Uwadiae Egharevba MBE (1893–1980) was a Edo historian and traditional chief whose writings specialized in the history of Benin Kingdom.

== Life ==
=== Early life ===
Egharevba was born in Idanre, Ondo State, His father was related to Ohenmwen, Iyase of Benin and his mother, Okunzuwa was the granddaughter of Ogie Ezomo I. His father was a trader but died in 1902. Egharevba spent part of his early childhood at the residence of his aunt in Idanre. His education was brief and irregular, he spent a year at St James' CMS School, Ibadan in 1899 and then an interval where he was out of school. He returned to studies at St David's School, Akure in 1911 before moving to St. Mathews, Benin. As a young boy, he worked part-time as a helper on canoes ferrying goods for sale between Benin Division and nearby cities. After finishing studies, Egharevba held a few low paying jobs. He worked as a water rate clerk in Benin but left the job in 1917 to work for the Public Works Department. In 1922, he began trading goods in Benin and Sapele. During this period, he became close to the family of Oba Akenzua II. His friendship with the royal family allowed him access to senior informants who had knowledge of Benin's oral history.

=== Professional career ===
In 1921, Egharevba wrote the draft of his first book, Ekhere vb Itan Edo later known as A Short History of Benin. The book was published c.1933 by CMS Press and was very successful. His first four publications were in the Edo language, but he switched to English in 1934 due to its widespread use and the effect on commercial appeal. He followed his first book with Benin Law and Custom, published in 1934. Egharevba's knowledge of Benin history, laws and customs was used in Native Court cases where he served as consultant on Benin traditions. Apart from writing books, he contributed articles to newspapers and wrote petitions to the colonial government. In 1934, he started a printing press in Benin.

Egharevba was appointed the curator of the Benin Museum in 1946. While working as a curator, he was also a prolific writer, having written 28 books by 1968. In 1973, 13 of his works were published in two volumes.

== Works ==
Egharevba's most famous work is A Short History of Benin. Published in different editions, it has major differences in some paragraphs between the editions. His books which documented the oral history and culture of Benin cut across different disciplines but the main content deals with issues, events, institutions, practices and personalities in Benin history. A lot of his early writings from 1934 to 1948 dealt with documentation of oral history, folklore and customs to instil moral values in young people. Afterwards, he included commentaries about contemporary issues and personalities in Benin history in his writings. However, some of the materials are repetitive, re-stating statements from his earlier works.

=== Selected writings ===
- A Short History of Benin.
- Benin Law and Custom.
- Concise Lives of the Famous Iyases of Benin.
- The murder of Imaguero and tragedy of Idah War
- Benin games and sports
- Urod d'Agbon
- Ihun-an Edo vb'Obo
- Some Stories of Ancient Benin
- Some Tribal gods of Southern Nigeria
- Ozedu-Interpreter
- The origin of Benin
- Bini Titles
- Amazevbo Omwan Tawiri
- A Brief History of the Life of Gauis Obaseki
- Marriage of the Princesses of Benin
- Ere Ede vb'Obo
- Ominigbon vb'Obo
- Chronicle of Events in Benin
- Fusion of Tribes
- Some prominent Bini people
- Egharevba family
- A Brief Autobiography
- Descriptive catalogue of Benin Museum
- A Brief Life History of Evian
- Itan Edagbon Mwen
- Okhuaihe of Ikhuen
- The Ake of Isi

== See also ==
- Edo literature

== Sources ==
- "Profile of Egharevba: The Man Egharevba". Spear Magazine. Lagos: Daily Times. May 1968.
- Eisenhofer, Stefan (1995). "The Origins of the Benin Kingship in the Works of Jacob Egharevba". History in Africa. 22. Cambridge University Press (CUP): 141–163. doi:10.2307/3171912. ISSN 0361-5413. JSTOR 3171912. S2CID 161445279.
- Egharevba, Jacob (1968). Brief Autobiography. Benin city: Benin Museum in Komm.
- Falola, Toyin; Usuanlele, Uyilawa (1994). "The Scholarship of Jacob Egharevba of Benin". History in Africa. 21: 303–318. doi:10.2307/3171890. JSTOR 3171890.
