= Description of Africa (Dapper book) =

Dutch book from 1668

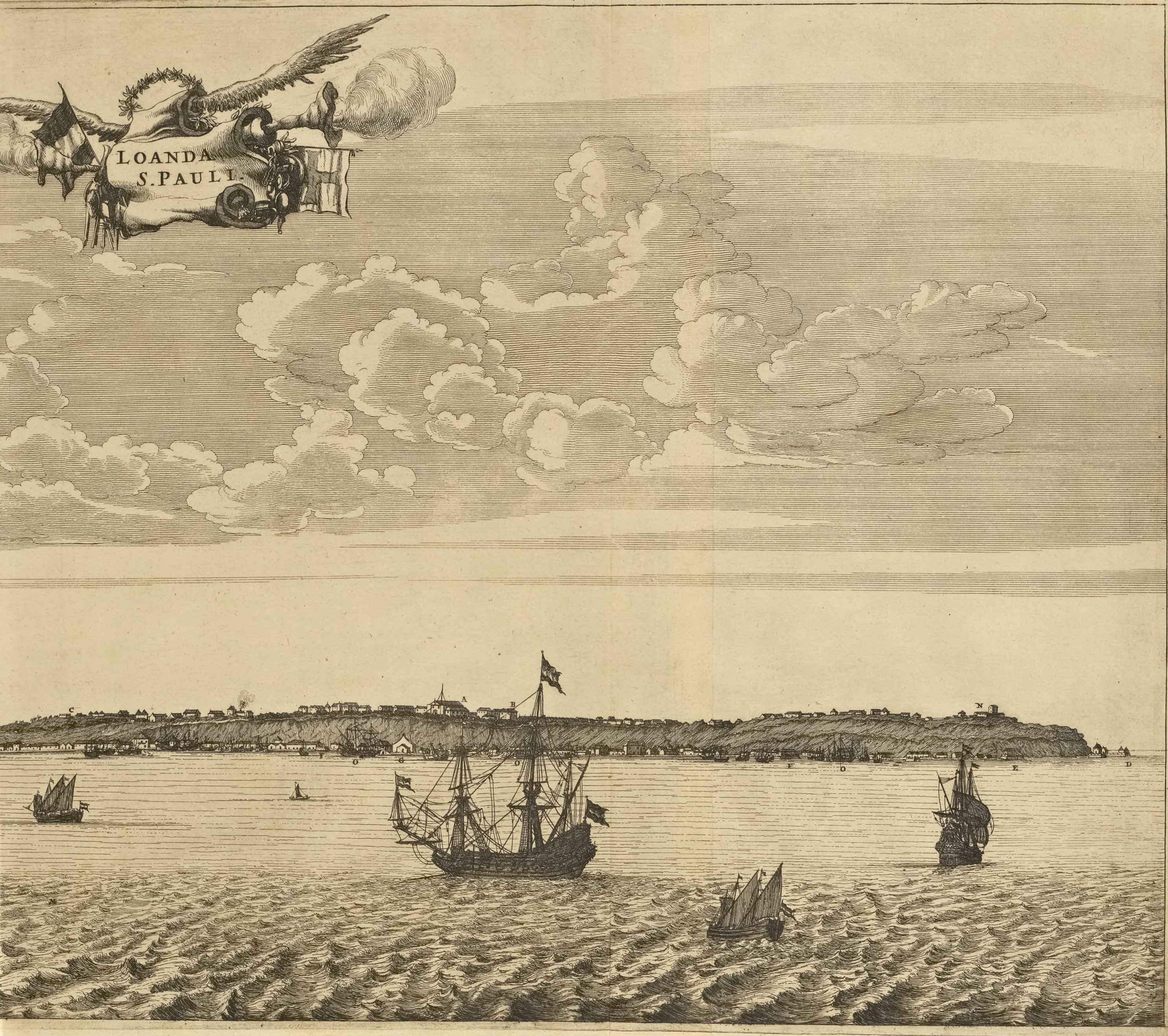
A view of Dutch warships off the port city of Luanda (modern-day Angola) from the Description of Africa

Description of Africa (in the original archaic Dutch Naukeurige Beschrijvinge der Afrikaensche Gewesten, or "Accurate Descriptions of the African Regions") (Note: In full, Naukeurige Beschrijvinge Der Afrikaensche Gewesten Van Egypten, Barbaryen, Libyen, Biledulgerid, Negroslant, Guinea, Ethiopiën, Abyssinie: Vertoont In de Benamingen, Grenspalen, Steden, Revieren, gewassen, Dieren, Zeeden, Drachten, Talen, Rijkdommen, Godsdiensten en Heerschappyen or, in translation, "An Accurate Description of African Places in Egypt, Barbary, Libya, Biledulgerid, Negroland, Guinea, Ethiopia, Abyssinia: Showing place names, boundaries, crops, animals, timbers, costumes, languages, kingdoms, religions, and dominions".) is a Dutch ethnographic book published in 1668 describing Africa. The work consists of detailed descriptions of the parts of Africa known to Europeans in the mid-seventeenth century and was written by the geographer Olfert Dapper.

== Book ==
Among other things, the book contains a rare description of the Kingdom of Benin which explicitly mentions the Benin Bronzes.

Dapper never visited Africa himself, but relied very heavily on records of the Dutch West India Company, especially a collection made by Samuel Bloomaerts, one of its officials. The records which Dapper used are no longer extant, however, as searches for the original reports and letters in the archives of the company, held by the Dutch National Archive, have not produced anything original.

It was first published in Amsterdam by Jacob van Meurs in 1668, and a second edition appeared in 1676. A German translation was issued in 1670, as was the English translation, often attributed to John Ogilby, as Africa in 1670. A French translation also appeared in 1676. All of these translations have problems with occasional mistranslations but more significantly, abbreviation of the contents. The German and English versions are the most faithful, both in translation and inclusion of the original material, the French edition is generally regarded as quite deficient.

== Illustrations ==
The illustrations of Central Africa were probably based on work by Abraham Willaerts who accompanied the Dutch expedition against Portuguese Angola in 1641. The illustration of Mbanza Kongo matches very well with the topography of the site, the location of wells and the position of the Jesuit church. Other illustrations are generally notable for faithfully presenting cloth, clothing, tools and weapons.

== Bibliography ==
- Willett, Frank (1985). African Art: An Introduction (Reprint. ed.). New York: Thames and Hudson. ISBN 0-500-20103-X.
