= Kingdom of Benin =

West African kingdom (1180–1897)

Coordinates: 6°20′0″N 5°37′20″E

Kingdom of Benin Edo
- 1180–1897
- Status: Independent until 1897, currently a non-sovereign monarchy within Nigeria
- Capital: Edo
- Common languages: Edo
- Religion: Edo Religion, Catholic Christianity
- Government: Monarchy
- Oba
  - 1180–1246 (first): Eweka I
  - 1888–1897: Ovonramwen (Note: last sovereign monarch)
  - 2016–present: Ewuare II (Note: current non-sovereign monarch)
- History
  - Oba monarchy replaces Ogiso monarchy: 1180
  - Conquered by the United Kingdom, integrated into Niger Coast Protectorate: 1897
  - Ovonramwen dies in exile, his successor Eweka II rebuilds the monarchy under British suzerainty: 1914
- Currency: Cowries
| Preceded by | Succeeded by |
| Igodomigodo | Niger Coast Protectorate |
- Today part of: Nigeria

The Kingdom of Benin or Empire of Benin, also known as Great Benin, is a traditional kingdom in southern Nigeria. It has no historical relation to the modern Republic of Benin, which was known as Dahomey from the 17th century until 1975. The Kingdom of Benin's capital was Edo, now known as Benin City in Edo State, Nigeria. The Benin Kingdom was one of the oldest and most developed states in the coastal hinterland of West Africa. It grew out of the previous Edo Kingdom of Igodomigodo around the 11th century AD; it was annexed by the British Empire in 1897, but endured as a non-sovereign monarchy.

In the 15th and 16th centuries, the empire reached the height of its prosperity, expanding its territory, trading with European powers, and creating a remarkable artistic legacy in cast bronze, iron, brass, carved ivory, and other materials.

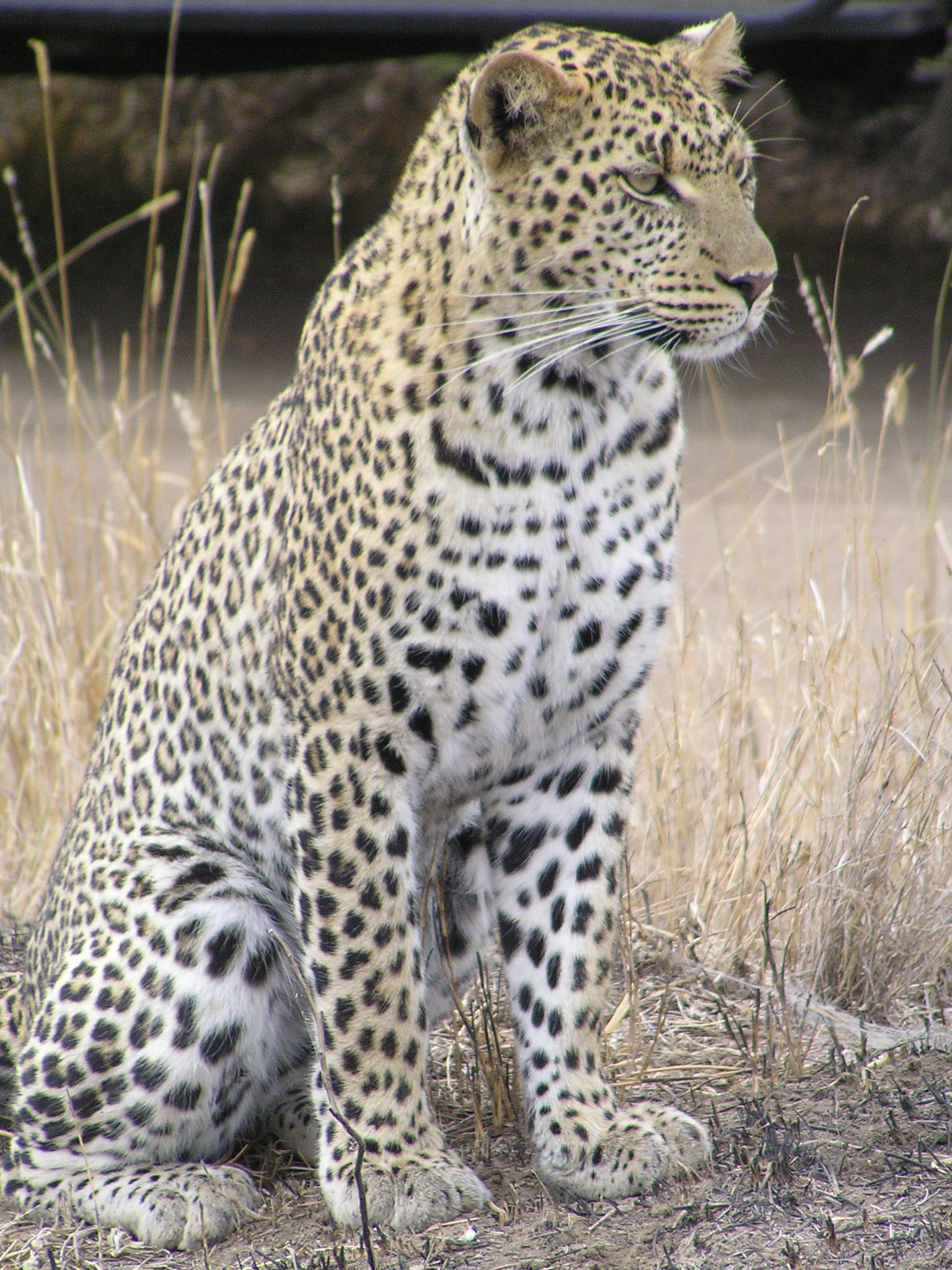
The leopard, totem of the kings and emperors of Benin

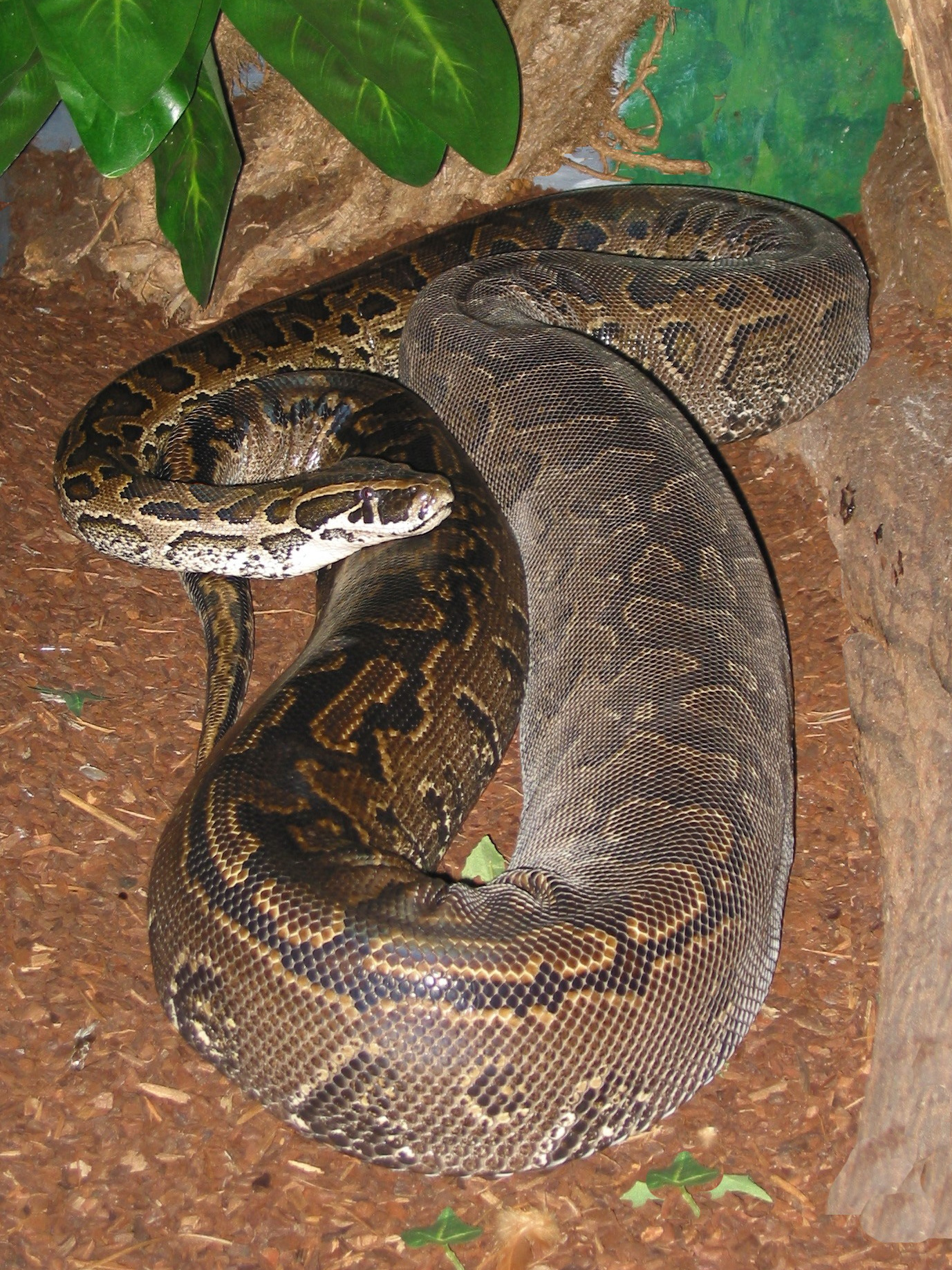
The python, totem of the kings and emperors of Benin

== History ==
=== Ancient origin ===
The presence of the sickle-cell allele in the Sahara during the Green Sahara period suggests that ancient ancestors of the Edo people may have inhabited the Saharan region in prehistoric times before migrating southward. The gradual movement of Proto-Edoid people to West Africa may have been associated with the expansion of Sahel agriculture in the African Neolithic period, following the desiccation of the Sahara in c. 3500 BCE.

=== Early settlement ===
The state that became known as the Benin Empire developed in several phases. It was known by various names both inside and outside its borders.

By the 1st century BC, the Benin territory was partially agricultural; it became primarily agricultural by around A.D. 500, but hunting and gathering of animals still remained important. Also by A.D. 500, the territory's inhabitants used iron.

=== Igodomigodo (900–1180 CE) ===
The earliest organized polity in the region that became Benin was Igodomigodo, which coalesced from existing autonomous communities in the late 1st millennium CE. The ruler was called Ogiso – the ruler of the sky. The Egiso (Note: Plural of 'Ogiso'.) put in place many of the cultural and social traditions that have shaped Benin.

Igodomigodo, meaning "town of Igodo", served as the first capital, and sprang up in a forest whose dense vegetation and narrow paths made the city easy to defend against attacks. The rainforest helped the city develop because of its vast resources – fish from rivers and creeks, animals to hunt, leaves for roofing, plants for medicine, ivory for carving and trading, and wood for boat building. Domesticated animals could not survive due to a disease spread by tsetse flies; after centuries of exposure, some animals, such as cattle and goats, developed resistance to the disease.

=== Ile-Ibinu (1180–1255 CE) ===
By the start of the 13th century CE, Ogiso Owodo was overthrown by the people of the state after a tumultuous and incompetent reign. In his place they chose Evian, a popular and powerful Ogifa, earth-priest and chief of the local Efa people, as okaevbo or head of state. Evian's later attempt to pass power to his son Ogiamwen, thereby creating a new royal dynasty, was resisted. The Edionevbo (ruling council of chiefs) refused to sanction the move, and sent emissaries requesting that a prince of Ile-Ife restore order and legitimacy to their throne.

Historical traditions in Benin diverge on the details of these events. The 'official' tradition records that Oranmiyan, son of Oduduwa, accepted the council's invitation; his arrival marked the beginning of the new Yoruba dynasty and the establishment of the title "Oba" for the rulers of Benin. This version serves as a 'stock narrative' used by the leaders of the Ife Empire to explain and justify the expansion of Yoruba cultural and economic sphere of influence into Igodomigodo during this period.

Another tradition, first recorded in the 1970s, provides a different story. While several versions exist, some argue that the founding Oba was not a Yoruba but was instead the son or grandson of Ogiso Owodo, natives of Benin who were in exile in Ife. Some go further, claiming that Owodo's son Ekaladerhan and Oduduwa are the same person, and therefore that the Edo were responsible for the foundation or organization of Ile-Ife. Historians generally see these alternative accounts as recent inventions or distortions of older historical traditions in response to the dynamics of modern Nigerian society.

Whether Oranmiyan was ethnically Yoruba or the son of an Edo exile, his claim to the throne was not universally acknowledged. Ogiamwen, son of Evian, had many supporters in the city's Efa wards, and likely held power when Oranmiyan arrived. A battle ensued between the two sides, with the newcomers, supported by the Edionevbo, entering the city. Despite his victory, Oranmiyan struggled to master the complex politics of the divided kingdom, particularly since he was a foreigner. He married Erinmwinde, daughter of a local chief, and they had a son, Eweka. Exasperated and desiring to rule in Ile-Ife, Oranmiyan abdicated the throne of Benin in favor of his son, saying that only a native could rule effectively.

According to oral and later written tradition, he declared in anger that the state was "Ile-Ibinu", or a "land of vexation", because it was so hard to govern. This is the earliest occurrence of any etymological link to the modern name "Benin".

Eweka was crowned ruler of Ile-Ibinu circa 1200, using special regalia his father sent from Ife. Several local chiefs were appointed to help the young king rule. During his reign, which lasted until roughly 1235, the state became even more centralized. As a compatriot of the first 3 Yoruba rulers in the Ogiso line, Oranmiyan and the new Oba dynasty symbolized, to the Edo people, a restoration of the previous order amidst a period of misrule. The centralization advanced by Eweka over fragmenting chiefdoms, would not be firmly established until the reign of Ewedo, the fourth Oba.

=== Ubini (1255–1440 CE) ===
Oba Ewedo was crowned the fourth ruler of the state and is credited with moving the royal palace from Usama to its current location in Edo. He renamed the state from Ile-Ibinu "land of vexation" to Ubini, an Ilaje name meaning "land of inexhaustible resources". This rebranding coincided with a reformed political and administrative system, including a palace bureaucracy, and expanded territorial influence.

=== Edo (1440–1897 CE) ===
In 1440, Oba Ewuare, also known as Ewuare the Great, came to power and expanded the borders of the former city-state. Around 1470, the capital city was renamed to Edo after a royal slave who saved Ewuare's life during an attempted coup. The name of the city was later expanded to the whole state and its people.

The term Bini from the earlier name for the state utilized by the Itsekhiri became popular among the Portuguese and was corrupted to "Benin" by the Portuguese who arrived in an expedition led by João Afonso de Aveiro in 1485. These explorers would refer to the royal center as Benin City.

In the 15th century, Oba Ewuare is credited with turning Benin City into a city-state from a military fortress built by the Ogisos, protected by moats and walls. It was from this bastion that he launched his military campaigns and began the expansion of the kingdom from the Edo-speaking heartlands. Excavations also uncovered a rural network of earthen walls 6,000 to 13,000 km (4,000 to 8,000 mi) long that would have taken an estimated 150 million man-hours to build and must have taken hundreds of years to build. These were apparently raised to mark out territories for towns and cities. Thirteen years after Ewuare's death, tales of Benin's splendors lured more Portuguese traders to the city gates.

A series of walls marked the incremental growth of the city from 850 AD until its decline in the 16th century. To enclose his palace, Ewuare commanded the building of Benin's inner wall, an earthen rampart 11 kilometres (7 mi) long girded by a moat 6 m (20 ft) deep. This was excavated in the early 1960s by Graham Connah. Connah estimated that its construction if spread out over five dry seasons, would have required a workforce of 1,000 laborers working ten hours a day, seven days a week. Ewuare also added great thoroughfares and erected nine fortified gateways. Excavations at Benin City have revealed that it was already flourishing around 1200–1300 CE.

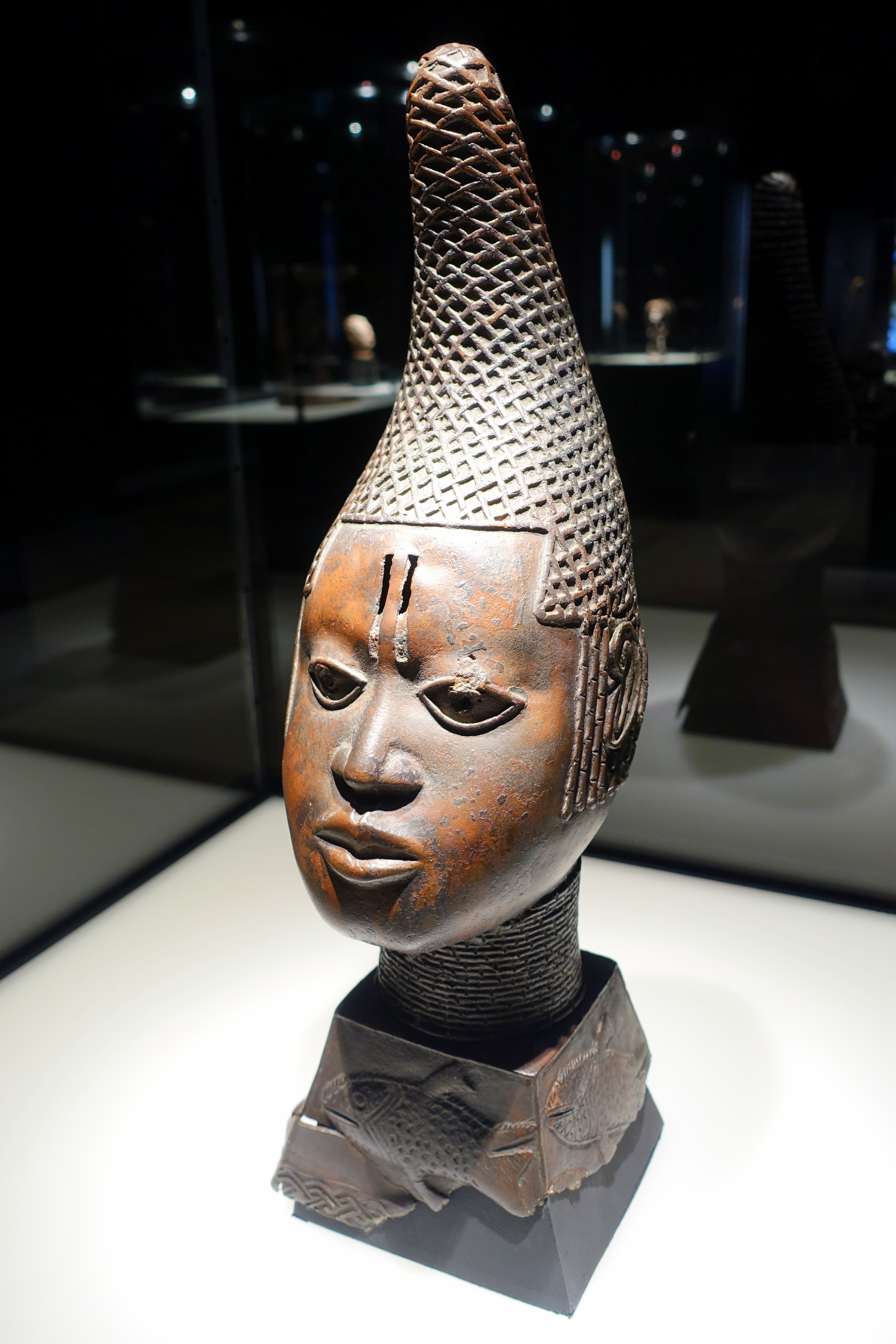
Bronze head of a queen mother, early 16th century

In the early 16th century, Oba Esigie expanded the kingdom eastwards, after defeating an invasion and attempted conquest of Benin by the Igala kingdom. Benin gained political strength and ascendancy over much of what is now mid-western Nigeria. Its wealth grew through its extensive trade, especially with the interior of the region, although the trade with Europeans that developed from the late 15th century onwards in pepper, slaves, cloth, and ivory provided a smaller, additional supplement to Benin's wealth, its economy, its technology, and art. Rhineland brass manilla bracelets, offered by Portuguese merchants, for Ivory, Peppers, and Slaves, from 1507 AD, have been found to be the metallic base for the Benin Bronzes, a few of the cast plaques depict the Portuguese merchants, manillas, and the weapons offered as trade goods.

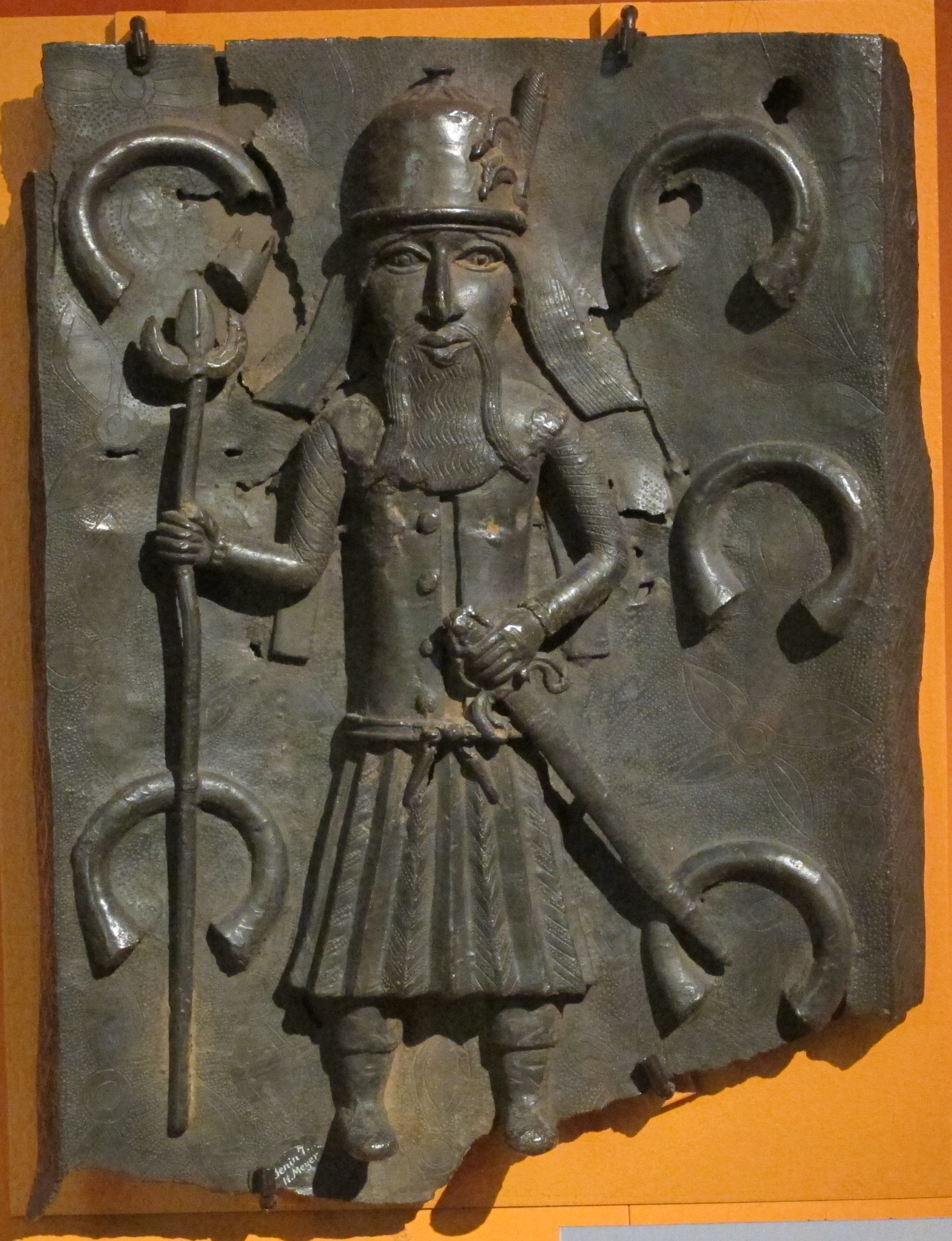
A Benin Bronze depicts a Portuguese merchant with brass manillas in the background

In addition to complete rule over the native Edo people, the Oba of Benin is said to have ruled over some tribes of the Niger Delta including the Western Igbo Tribes, Ijaw, Itshekiri, Isoko and Urhobo amongst others. Benin also possibly held sway over some areas of Eastern Yorubaland, such as Mahin, Ugbo, and parts of Ondo, Ekiti and Ijebu, though scholars believe that the dispersal from Benin into other parts of Yorubaland may have been as refugees. At its height in the 16th century, Benin was active in trade along much of the coastline from the Western Niger Delta, through Lagos reaching almost Accra in the West.

The state developed an advanced artistic culture, especially in its artifacts of brass alloy, iron, and ivory. These include wall plaques and life-sized heads depicting the Obas and Iyobas of Benin. These plaques also included other human, including Portuguese merchants, and animal figures as well as items like ceremonial belts. Ivory was also used, as seen in the carving of ivory into ornate boxes, combs, and armlets. The most well-known artifact is based on Queen Idia, now known as the Benin ivory mask. Ivory masks were meant to be worn around the waist of kings.

==== Civil War ====
Ruling in the late 16th century, Oba Ehengbuda was the last of the warrior kings; after his reign the empire gradually shrank in size, losing control over territories in the west. The end of his reign saw a rise in the power of prominent officials, and during the following decades many Oba's enjoyed short and turbulent reigns as various branches of the royal family fought for position. The death of Oba Ohuan in 1641 may have marked the end of the direct father-to-son line of succession going back to Eweka I. Officials also increasingly controlled the military and trade, as cloth came to replace the previously dominant pepper and ivory as trade commodities.

A civil war broke out around 1689, around the time that Oba Ewuakpe ascended to the throne. Iyase Ode and lower-ranked members of the royal administration revolted against their superiors attempts to control them. The Oba brought in troops from another city but could not defeat the rebels, and Benin city was sacked. The war continued for roughly 10 years before negotiations brought them to an end. Ewuakpe's succession, however, was disputed between his two sons Ozuere and Akenzua. Akenzua and his close ally, a traditional chief who bore the title Ezomo, eventually prevailed over the younger Ozuere and his ally, the Iyase Ode in a decisive battle in 1721. Cleanup and reconquest of rebel areas, however, took another 10 years. With renewed stability in the kingdom and, Oba Akenzua benefited from trade with Europeans and was to be one of the richest obas in the kingdom's history.

=== Britain seeks control over trade ===
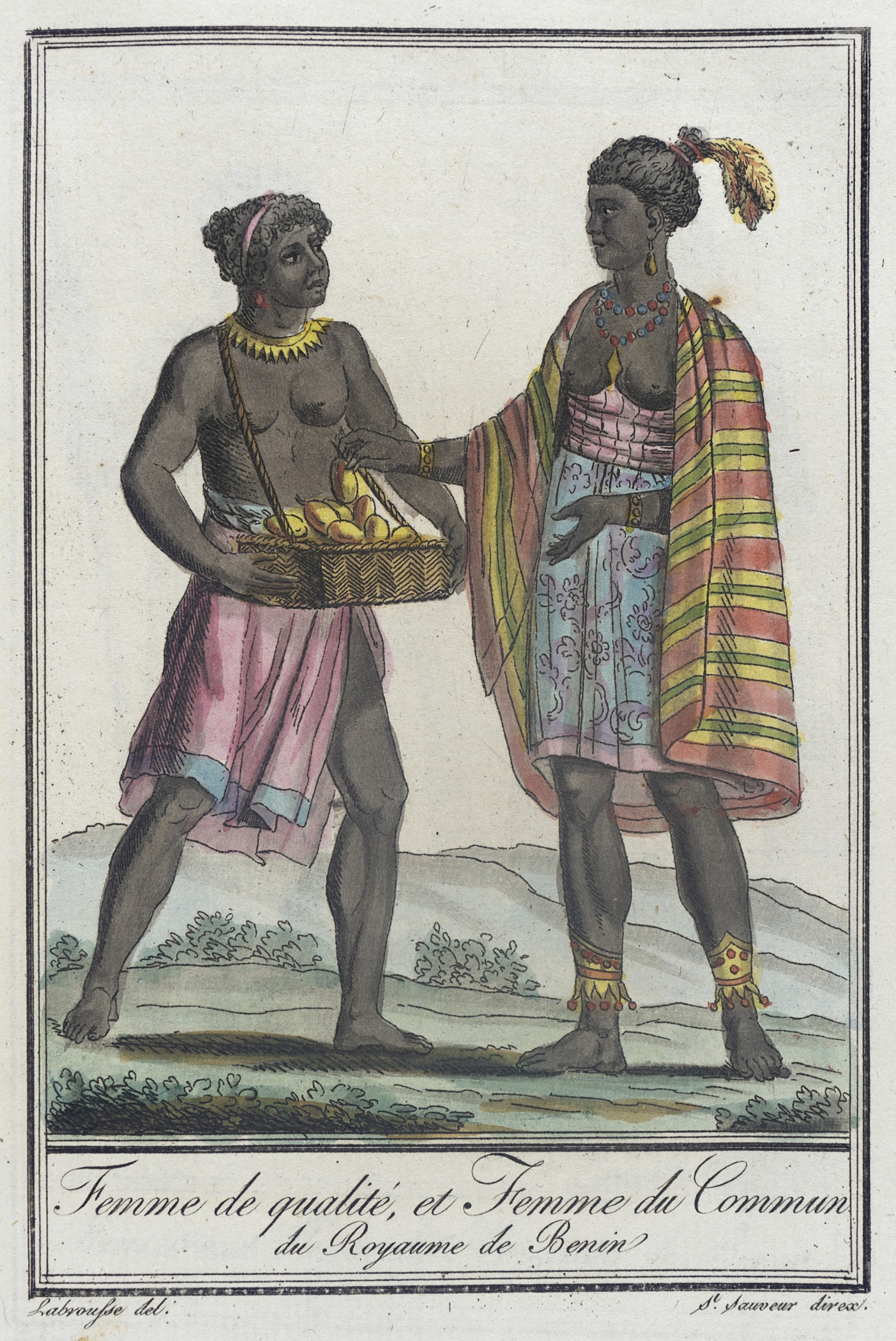
Depiction of two women from the kingdom of Benin, 1797

Benin's economy was thriving in the early to mid 19th century with the development of the trade in palm oil, and the continuation of the trade in textiles, ivory and other resources. To preserve the kingdom's independence, the Oba gradually banned the export of goods from Benin, until the trade was exclusively in palm oil.

By the latter half of the 19th century, Britain desired a closer relationship with the Kingdom of Benin; as British officials were increasingly interested in controlling trade in the area and in accessing the kingdom's palm oil, kola nut, ivory and potentially rubber resources, following the introduction of Hevea brasiliensis saplings, via Kew Gardens in 1895.

Several attempts were made to achieve this end beginning with the official visit of Richard Francis Burton in 1862 when he was consul at Fernando Pó. Following that came attempts to establish a treaty between Benin and the United Kingdom by Hewtt, Blair, and Annesley in 1884, 1885 and 1886 respectively. However, these efforts did not yield any results. The kingdom resisted becoming a British protectorate throughout the 1880s, but the British remained persistent. Progress was made in 1892 during the visit of Vice-Consul Henry Gallwey. This mission was the first official visit after Burton's. Moreover, it would also set in motion the events to come that would lead to Oba Ovonramwen's fall from power.

=== The Gallwey Treaty of 1892 ===
In the late 19th century, the Kingdom of Benin managed to retain its independence and the Oba exercised a monopoly over trade which British merchants in the region found irksome. The territory was coveted by an influential group of investors for its rich natural resources such as palm-oil, and ivory. After British consul Richard Burton visited Benin in 1862 he wrote of Benin's as a place of "gratuitous barbarity which stinks of death", a narrative which was publicized in Britain and increased support for the territory's colonization. In spite of this, the kingdom maintained its independence and was not visited by another representative of Britain until 1892 when Henry Gallwey, the British Vice-Consul of the Oil Rivers Protectorate (later the Niger Coast Protectorate), visited Benin City hoping to open up trade and ultimately annex Benin Kingdom and transform it into a British protectorate. Gallwey was able to get Omo n'Oba (Ovonramwen) and his chiefs to sign a treaty which gave Britain legal justification for exerting greater influence over the Empire. While the treaty itself contains text suggesting Ovonramwen sought Benin to become a protectorate, this was contrasted by Gallwey's own account, which suggests the Oba was hesitant to sign the treaty. Although some suggest that humanitarian motivations were driving Britain's actions, letters written between colonial administrators suggest that economic motivations were predominant. The treaty itself does not explicitly mention anything about Benin's "bloody customs" that Burton had written about, and instead only includes a vague clause about ensuring "the general progress of civilization".

=== The Massacre of 1897 ===
An unidentified West African flag supposedly brought to Britain by Lieutenant (later Admiral) F. W. Kennedy after the expedition

A British delegation departed from the Oil Rivers Protectorate in 1897 with the stated aim of negotiating with the Oba of Benin regarding the trade agreement, which they felt he was not keeping. The leader of the delegation, James Robert Phillips, had asked his superiors in the British Foreign Office for permission to lead an armed British expedition to depose the Oba of Benin not long before the expedition, but left for Benin City with a diplomatic delegation (or a reconnaissance mission disguised as a peaceful diplomatic delegation) before receiving a reply to his request. Perceiving this to be an attempt to depose the Oba, the Oba's generals unilaterally ordered an attack on the delegation as it was approaching Benin City (which included eight unknowing British representatives and hundreds of African porters and labourers) all but two of whom were killed. A punitive expedition was launched in response, and a 1,200-men strong force, under the command of Sir Harry Rawson, captured Benin City. They deliberately sought out and destroyed certain areas of the city, including those thought to belong to the chiefs responsible for the ambush of the British delegation, and in the process a fire burnt the palace and surrounding quarters, which the British claimed was accidental.

There has much debate of why James Phillips set out on the mission to Benin without much weaponry. Some have argued he was going on a peaceful mission. Such commentators argue that the message from the Oba that his festival would not permit him to receive European visitors touched the humanitarian side of Phillips's character because of an incorrect assumption that the festival included human sacrifice. According to Igbafe, this does not explain why Phillips set out before he had received a reply from the Foreign Office to his request where he stated that:

F.O. 2/I02, Phillips to F.O. no. 105 of i6 Nov 1896. Phillips wrote that 'there is nothing in the shape of a standing army. ... and the inhabitants appear to be if not a peace-loving at any rate a most unwarlike people whose only exploits during many generations had been an occasional quarrel with their neighbours about trade or slave raiding and it appears at least improbable that they have any arms to speak of except the usual number of trade guns... When Captain Gallwey visited the city the only canon he saw were half a dozen old Portuguese guns. They were lying on the grass unmounted'. Compare this with the opinion of his immediate predecessor, Ralph Moor, who was convinced that 'the people in all the villages are no doubt possessed of arms' (F.O. 2/84, Moor to F.O. no. 39 of I2 Sept. 1895).

Igbafe also points to Phillips' November 1896 advocacy of military force regarding Benin, arguing that this is inconsistent with the perception of Phillips as a man of peace in January 1897. Igbafe posits that Phillips was going on a reconnaissance mission and that Phillips' haste to Benin can be explained by a belief that nothing bad would happen to him or his party.

The expeditionary force also took the palace art as war booty. The looted portrait figures, busts, and groups created in iron, carved ivory, and especially in brass (conventionally termed the "Benin Bronzes") were sold off to defray the cost of the expedition and some were accessioned to the British Museum; most were sold elsewhere and are now on display in various museums around the world.

=== Post-1897 ===
The British occupied Benin, which was absorbed into the British Niger Coast Protectorate and eventually into British colonial Nigeria. A general emancipation of slaves followed in the wake of British occupation but Britain also imposed a system of forced labour in Benin and in surrounding areas, as they did throughout other parts of southern Nigeria. The British launched an additional operation in 1899, called the "Benin Territories Expedition", against rebels still holding out against the British. The British burnt down numerous towns, and destroyed farms in an attempt to starve the rebels into submission. After the 1899 expedition, military resistance in the former Kingdom of Benin against the British occupation ceased.

Oba Ovonramwen died in exile in Calabar, in January 1914. His son Aiguobasinwin was enthroned as Oba on 24 July, taking the regnal name Eweka II. His coronation coincided with a shift in British policy towards indirect rule, and so he was allowed to return to Benin. Eweka II rebuilt the royal palace, which had been destroyed in 1897. He also reestablished the traditional officers of the kingdom, restored the craft guilds, commissioned objects to replace those looted by the British, and started the Benin Arts and Crafts School.

Eweka II's rule marked Benin's transition to a non-sovereign monarchy within first colonial and then independent Nigeria. His successors have played important roles mediating political disputes and working towards the return of the looted Benin Bronzes. In March 2021, institutions in Berlin, Germany and Aberdeen, Scotland announced decisions to return Benin Bronzes in their possession to their place of origin.

21 bronzes were returned by Germany in December 2022. The Nigerian government then gave them to the Oba stating that he was the rightful owner.

== Notable figures ==
House of Eweka
- Nigerian royal dynasty
- Parent house: Oodua
- Current region: Niger Delta
- Founded: c.12th century
- Founder: Oranmiyan
- Current head: Ewuare II
- Titles: Oba of Benin; Iyoba of Benin; Edaiken of Benin; Iyasere of Benin; Enogie of Benin; Okhaemwen of Benin; Odionwere of Benin; Olooi of Benin
- Styles: Omo n'Oba, Uku Akpolopolo; Majesty; Royal Highness
- Members: Ewuare; Idia; Esigie
- Connected families: Ife royal family Oyo royal family
- Traditions: Bini religion Christianity
- Motto: Edo Orisiagbon (Bini for "Benin, the Cradle of the World")
- Cadet branches: Akenzua (Benin); Ado, Lagos (Maternally); Osupa, Akure (Maternally); Abodi (Ikale)

Below are several notable figures of the Kingdom of Benin

- Queen Idia was the wife of Oba Ozolua, the Oba who reigned in about 1481 AD. She was a famous warrior who received much of the credit for the victories of her son as his political counsel, together with her mystical powers and medicinal knowledge, were viewed as critical elements of Esigie's success on the battlefield. Queen Idia became more popular when an ivory carving of her face was adopted as the symbol of FESTAC in 1977.
- Emotan was a trader who sold her wares at the exact point where her statue now stands. She was historically credited with setting up the first primary school in the kingdom and saving the monarchy during one of its lowest moments. She helped the Oba Ewuare in reclaiming the throne from his usurper brother, Oba Uwaifiokun who reigned about 1432 AD.
- Queen Iden is yet another heroine whose sacrifice helped shape Benin Kingdom. She was the queen during the reign of Oba Ewuape in about 1700 AD. She is known to have volunteered herself as a sacrificial lamb for the welfare of her husband and that of the entire kingdom after she consulted the oracle and was informed that human sacrifice would be needed to appease the gods and restore peace and unity in the kingdom.
- General Asoro the Warrior was the sword bearer to King Ovonramwen (the Oba of Benin) in 1897. He participated in the defence of Benin during the 1897 expedition, engaging the British expeditionary force sent to capture the Oba. A quote uttered by the general that "no other person [should] dare pass this road except the Oba" (So kpon Oba) was later translated to "SAKPONBA", which a well known road in Benin was named after.
- Chief Obasogie was not just an outstanding Benin warrior of old who defended the kingdom against external invasion but also a talented blacksmith and sculptor.

== Rituals and law ==
=== Human sacrifice ===
Many 19th century reports by European travelers and colonizers emphasize the practice of Juju human sacrifice, in Benin, and these have colored later scholarly works on the kingdom. From the early days, human sacrifices were a part of the state religion. But many of the accounts of the sacrifices, says historian J. D. Graham, are exaggerated or based on rumour and speculation. He says that all of the evidence "points to a limited, ritual custom of human sacrifice, many of the written accounts referring to the human sacrifices describe them as actually being executed criminals".

Forty-one female skeletons thrown into a pit were discovered by the archaeologist Graham Connah in the 1960s. He interpreted these findings as showing that human sacrifice or execution of criminals took place in Benin in the thirteenth century AD. The skeletons show no signs of violence, however, and may instead be a mass grave from a bubonic plague outbreak.

Edo historian Professor Philip Igbafe states that in pre-colonial Benin, the tradition was that only slaves could be sacrificed. This could include hardened criminals and those who had committed serious crimes, who would either be executed or sold into slavery. Sacrifices were made at the anniversary of the Oba's father, at the annual bead ceremony, and to propitiate the gods when poor weather threatened crops or when an epidemic threatened. In addition, the threat of a major calamity or national disaster was also an occasion for sacrifices.

Humans were sacrificed in an annual ritual in honour of the god of iron, where warriors from Benin City would perform an acrobatic dance while suspended from the trees. The ritual recalled a mythical war against the sky.

Sacrifices of a man, a woman, a goat, a cow and a ram were also made to a god called "the king of death". The god, named Ogiuwu, was worshipped at a special altar in the centre of Benin City.

There were two separate annual series of rites that honored past Obas. Sacrifices were performed every fifth day. At the end of each series of rites, the current Oba's deceased father was honored with a public festival. During the festival, twelve criminals, chosen from a prison where the worst criminals were held, were sacrificed.

By the end of the eighteenth century, three to four people were sacrificed at the mouth of the Benin River annually, to attract European trade, according to one source.

=== Burials ===
The monarchy of Benin was hereditary; the eldest son was to become the new Oba. In order to validate the succession of the kingship, the eldest son had to bury his father and perform elaborate rituals. If the eldest son failed to complete these tasks, he might be disqualified from becoming king.

=== Separation of son and mother ===
After the son was installed as king, his mother – after having been invested with the title of Iyoba – was transferred to a palace just outside Benin City, in a place called Uselu. The mother held a considerable amount of power but was never allowed to meet her son – who was now a divine ruler – again.

=== Divinity of the Oba ===
In Benin, the Oba was seen as divine. The Oba's divinity and sacredness was the focal point of the kingship. The Oba was shrouded in mystery; he only left his palace on ceremonial occasions. It was previously punishable by death to assert that the Oba performed human acts, such as eating, sleeping, dying or washing. The Oba was also credited with having magical powers. He also controlled a powerful bureaucratic apparatus whose decrees were obeyed to the letter.

== Architecture ==
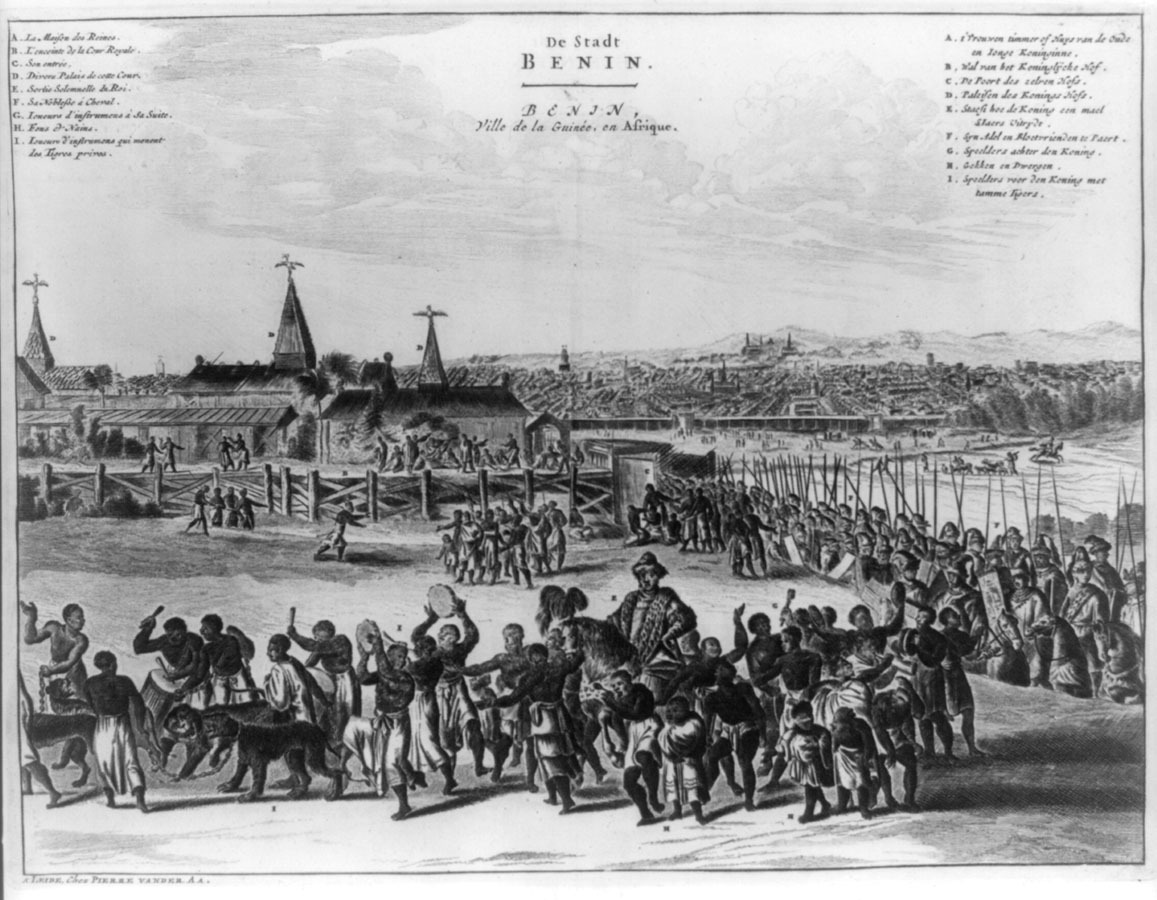
Depiction of Benin City by a Dutch illustrator in 1668. The wall-like structure in the centre probably represents the walls of Benin.

The impluvium was used in Benin architecture to store rainwater. Among the residences of the nobility, a compluvium channeled the rainwater into the impluvium in order to permit light and air through the walls since windows were absent among these structures. The stored rainwater in the impluvium was discharged out of the house through a drainage system beneath the floor. Archaeological works from the mid 20th century has revealed the existence of edge-laid potsherd pavements in Benin city, dated around or prior to the 14th century. The Walls of Benin are a series of earthworks made up of banks and ditches, called iya in the Edo language in the area around present-day Benin City, the capital of present-day Edo, Nigeria. They consist of 15 kilometres (9.3 miles) of city iya and an estimated 16,000 kilometres (9,900 miles) in the rural area around Benin. Some estimates suggest that the walls of Benin may have been constructed between the thirteenth and mid-fifteenth century CE and others suggest that the walls of Benin (in the Esan region) may have been constructed during the first millennium AD.

=== City walls ===
The Benin City walls have been known to Westerners since around 1500. Around 1500, the Portuguese explorer Duarte Pacheco Pereira, briefly described the walls during his travels. In Pereira's Esmeraldo de Situ Orbis, 1505, we read:

This city is about a league long from gate to gate; it has no wall but is surrounded by a large moat, very wide and deep, which suffices for its defence.

The archaeologist Graham Connah suggests that Pereira was probably mistaken with his description by saying that there was no wall. Connah says, "[Pereira] considered that a bank of earth was not a wall in the sense of the Europe of his day."

Another description given around 1600, one hundred years after Pereira's description, is by the Dutch explorer Dierick Ruiters. Ruiters' account of the walls is as follows:

At the gate where I entered on horsebacke, I saw a very high Bulwarke, very thick of earth, with a very deepe broade ditch, but it was drie, and full of high trees. ... That Gate is a reasonable good Gate, made of wood after their manner, which is to be shut, and there alwayes there is watch holden.

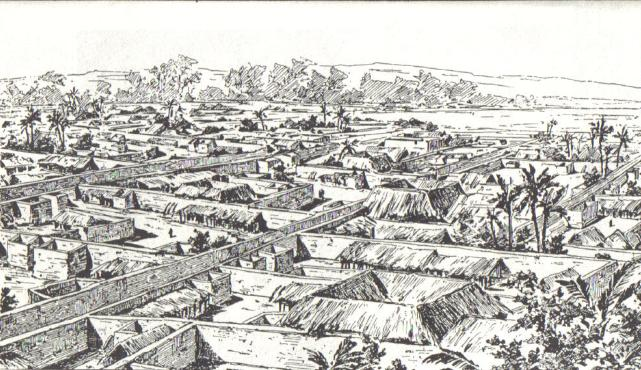
Benin in 1897

Estimates for the initial construction of the walls range from the first millennium to the mid-fifteenth century. According to Connah, oral tradition and travelers' accounts suggest a construction date of 1450–1500. It has been estimated that assuming a ten-hour work day, a labour force of 5,000 men could have completed the walls within 97 days, or by 2,421 men in 200 days. However, these estimates have been criticized for not taking into account the time it would have taken to extract the earth from an ever-deepening hole and the time it would have taken to heap the earth into a high bank. It is unknown whether slavery or some other type of labour was used in the construction of the walls.

The walls were built of a ditch and dike structure; the ditch dug to form an inner moat with the excavated earth used to form the exterior rampart. The rampart or wall and ditch/moat surrounding Benin City is estimated to have been approximately 12 kilometres (7.45 miles) in length.

There are also numerous other earthworks spread out across Edo State, of varying size, ranging from substantial embankments and ditches to slight boundary traces. Regarding these earthworks, Fred Pearce wrote in the New Scientist:

They extend for some 16,000 km in all, in a mosaic of more than 500 interconnected settlement boundaries. They cover 2,510 sq. miles (6,500 square kilometres) and were all dug by the Edo people. In all, they are four times longer than the Great Wall of China, and consumed a hundred times more material than the Great Pyramid of Cheops. They took an estimated 150 million hours of digging to construct, and are perhaps the largest single archaeological phenomenon on the planet.

==== Current state of the city walls ====
The Benin City walls (ramparts and moats) are currently in a degraded state and risk further degradation from urban expansion. Although some recent sources have claimed that the British punitive expedition in 1897 'destroyed' or 'heavily damaged' the Benin walls, there is no evidence for this from either historical or archaeological sources. A survey in 1964 found that the ramparts and ditches were still largely complete, though the city had already begun to expand beyond the walls and some damage had been done. However since the 1960s urban development has spread rapidly and more than half of the original ramparts have been destroyed. Causes of the destruction include earth extraction for road repairs and bricks, flattening the ramparts or filling up of ditches to gain space for buildings, accelerated erosion and silting of the ditches from the drainage of streets, cutting gaps into the ramparts to make way for streets, and using the moat as a dumping ground for refuse. The 'rural earthworks' spread across Edo State have also suffered from destruction and neglect by local populations.

Around 2007 the Benin Moat Foundation (BMF) was founded by the engineer Solomon Uwaifo with the aim of preserving the earthworks and promoting them for the purposes of tourism and national heritage. Owaifo "was horrified by what he saw of the Benin moat today, compared with what he remembered when he was a boy.” According to the BMF, during the period of colonial rule the British filled in parts of the moat to create roads for the city, and this continued after Independence as the need for new roads grew. Many of the local population "see the moat as a nuisance – a gaping, useless hole", and as a convenient dumping ground, whilst the ramparts are seen as both obtrusive structures and as an easy source of building materials. The lack of a government-implemented master plan for the city or properly enforced laws has resulted in anarchy and corruption, and the absence of public waste management and drainage systems has further exacerbated the problem. Nonetheless, today in parts of Benin City remains of the ancient moats still persist, visible as tree-lined embankments woven into the contemporary cityscape.

== Military ==
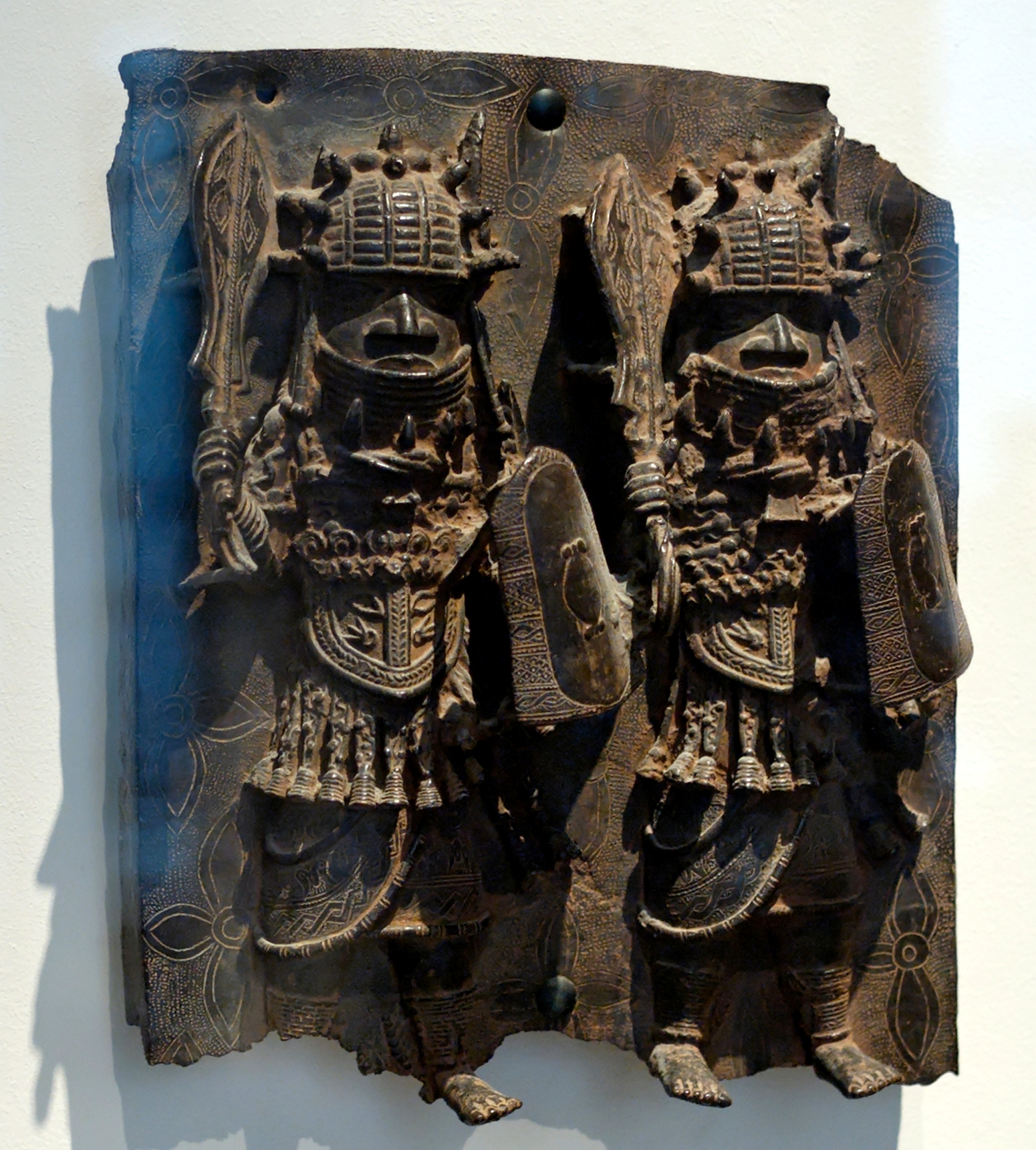
Copper-alloy wall plaque depicting two warriors wielding ceremonial swords

Military operations relied on a well trained disciplined force. At the head of the host stood the Oba of Benin. The monarch of the realm served as supreme military commander. Beneath him were subordinate generalissimos, the Ezomo, the Iyase, and others who supervised a Metropolitan Regiment based in the capital, and a Royal Regiment made up of hand-picked warriors that also served as bodyguards. Benin's queen mother, the Iyoba, also retained her own regiment – the "Queen's Own". The Metropolitan and Royal regiments were relatively stable semi-permanent or permanent formations. The Village Regiments provided the bulk of the fighting force and were mobilized as needed, sending contingents of warriors upon the command of the king and his generals. Formations were broken down into sub-units under designated commanders. Foreign observers often commented favorably on Benin's discipline and organization as "better disciplined than any other Guinea nation", contrasting them with the slacker troops from the Gold Coast.

Until the introduction of guns in the 15th century, traditional weapons like the spear, short sword, and bow held sway. Efforts were made to reorganize a local guild of blacksmiths in the 18th century to manufacture light firearms, but dependence on imports was still heavy. Before the coming of the gun, guilds of blacksmiths were charged with war production—particularly swords and iron spearheads. In addition, crossbowmen formed a specialized unit of the Benin army. Archers and crossbowmen were trained in target and field archery. In 1514 or 1516, the Oba of Benin seized a Portuguese bombard for use.

Benin's tactics were well organized, with preliminary plans weighed by the Oba and his sub-commanders. Logistics were organized to support missions from the usual porter forces, water transport via canoe, and requisitioning from localities the army passed through. Movement of troops via canoes was critically important in the lagoons, creeks and rivers of the Niger Delta, a key area of Benin's domination. Tactics in the field seem to have evolved over time. While the head-on clash was well known, documentation from the 18th century shows greater emphasis on avoiding continuous battle lines, and more effort to encircle an enemy (ifianyako).

Fortifications were important in the region and numerous military campaigns fought by Benin's soldiers revolved around sieges. Benin's military earthworks are the largest of such structures in the world, and Benin's rivals also built extensively. Barring a successful assault, most sieges were resolved by a strategy of attrition, slowly cutting off and starving out the enemy fortification until it capitulated. On occasion, however, European mercenaries were called on to aid with these sieges. In 1603–04 for example, European cannon helped batter and destroy the gates of a town near present-day Lagos, allowing 10,000 warriors of Benin to enter and conquer it. As payment, the Europeans received items, such as palm oil and bundles of pepper. The example of Benin shows the power of indigenous military systems, but also the role outside influences and new technologies brought to bear. This is a normal pattern among many nations.

== European contact ==
The first European travelers to reach Benin were Portuguese explorers under João Afonso de Aveiro in about 1485. A strong mercantile relationship developed, with the Edo trading slaves and tropical products such as ivory, pepper and palm oil for European goods such as manillas and guns. In the early 16th century, the Oba sent an ambassador to Lisbon, and the king of Portugal sent Christian missionaries to Benin City. Some residents of Benin City could still speak a pidgin Portuguese in the late 19th century.

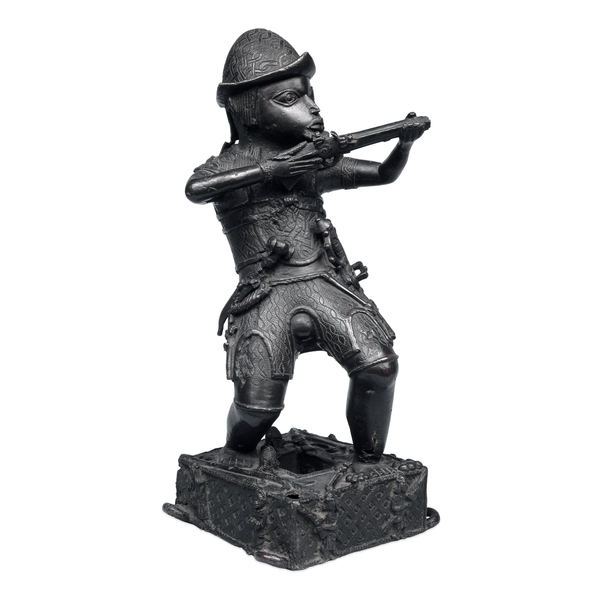
Bronce figure depicting a Portuguese soldier, holding a musket, 16th–17th centuries

The first English expedition to Benin was in 1553, and significant trading developed between Europe and Benin based on the export of ivory, palm oil, pepper, and later slaves. Visitors in the 16th and 19th centuries brought back to Europe tales of "Great Benin", a fabulous city of noble buildings, ruled over by a powerful king. A fanciful engraving of the settlement was made by a Dutch illustrator (from descriptions alone) and was shown in Olfert Dapper's Naukeurige Beschrijvinge der Afrikaensche Gewesten, published in Amsterdam in 1668. The work states the following about the royal palace:

The king's court is square and located on the right-hand side of the city, as one enters it through the gate of Gotton. It is about the same size as the city of Haarlem and entirely surrounded by a special wall, comparable to the one which encircles the town. It is divided into many magnificent palaces, houses and apartments of the courtiers, and comprises beautiful and long squares with galleries, about as large as the Exchange at Amsterdam. The buildings are of different sizes however, resting on wooden pillars, from top to bottom lined with copper casts, on which pictures of their war exploits and battles are engraved. All of them are being very well maintained. Most of the buildings within this court are covered with palm leaves, instead of with square planks, and every roof is adorned with a small spired tower, on which cast copper birds are standing, being very artfully sculpted and lifelike with their wings spread.

Another Dutch traveler, David van Nyendael, visited Benin in 1699 and also wrote an account of the kingdom. Nyendael's description was published in 1704 as an appendix to Willem Bosman's Nauwkeurige Beschryving van de Guinese Goud-, tand- en Slave-kust. In his description, Nyendael states the following about the character of the Benin people:

The inhabitants of the Benin are in general a kind and polite people, of whom one with kindness might get everything he desires. Whatever might be offered to them out of politeness, will always be doubled in return. However, they want their politeness to be returned with likewise courtesy as well, without the appearance of any disappointment or rudeness, and rightly so. To be sure, trying to take anything from them with force or violence, would be as if one tries to reach out to the Moon and will never be left unreckoned. When it comes to trade, they are very strict and will not suffer the slightest infringement of their customs, not even a iota can be changed. Though, when one is willing to accept these customs, they are very easy-going and will cooperate in every way possible to reach an agreement.

British trader James Pinnock who visited the kingdom writes that he saw "a large number of men all handcuffed and chained" with "their ears cut off with a razor". T. B. Auchterlonie describes the approach to the capital through an avenue of trees hung with decomposing human remains. After the "lane of horrors" came a grass common "thickly strewn with the skulls and bones of sacrificed human beings". The historian James D. Graham, in his article "The Slave Trade, Depopulation and Human Sacrifice in Benin History" (1965) has shown that the area where the skulls and bones of human beings were concentrated, called a "Golgotha" by a few European visitors, was actually a place where the bodies of dead and executed criminals were deposited, as noted by Captain H.L. Gallwey, who visited Benin in the 1890s: "Gallwey in 1893 stated that 'the king is all powerful though he would appear to be somewhat in the hands of his big men and very much tied down by fetish customs'. He also observed that the "Golgotha" was really 'the place where all criminals' bodies were deposited.' "

Scientific analysis of the brass (or "bronze") used to make the famous Benin plaques and other sculptures found that, beginning in the late 15th century, the metal (previously thought to have come from the Netherlands) began to derive from Germany's Rhineland region. At that time, the brass was exported from Germany in the form of ring-shaped ingots which were used as currency in the trans-Atlantic slave trade (bought from the Portuguese and incorporated by the people in Benin as a metal source in sculpture), and subsequently melted down in Benin to produce Benin Bronzes.

== See also ==
- Art of the Kingdom of Benin
- Edo people
- Edo language
- Festac Town
- Flag of the Kingdom of Benin
- History of Nigeria
- Iyoba of Benin
- Oba of Benin
- Walls of Benin

== Sources ==
- Akenzua, Edun (2000). "The Case of Benin". Appendices to the Minutes of Evidence, Appendix 21, House of Commons, The United Kingdom Parliament, March 2000.
- Ben-Amos, Paula (1999). Art, Innovation, and Politics in Eighteenth-Century Benin. Indiana University Press, 1999. ISBN 0-253-33503-5
- Bondarenko, Dmitri M. (2001). "Ancient Benin: Where Did the First Monarchs Come From?". Asian and African Studies. 10 (2). Institute of Oriental Studies of the Slovak Academy of Sciences: 185–198. ISSN 2585-8793.
- Bondarenko, Dmitri (2003). "Advent of the Second (Oba) Dynasty: Another Assessment of a Benin History Key Point". History in Africa. 30: 68. doi:10.1017/S0361541300003144. JSTOR 3172082.
- Bondarenko, Dmitri; Roese, Peter (2004). "Between the Ogiso and Oba Dynasties: An Interpretation of Interregnum in the Benin Kingdom". History in Africa. 31: 103–115. doi:10.1017/S0361541300003417. JSTOR 4128520.
- Bradbury, R.E. (2017). The Benin Kingdom and the Edo-speaking Peoples of South-western Nigeria. Routledge. ISBN 978-1-315-29383-7.
- Egharevba, Jacob (1968). A Short History of Benin. C.M.S. Press. ISBN 978-978-121-239-0.
- European traders in Benin to Major Copland Crawford. Reporting the stoppage of trade by the Benin King 1896 Apr 13, Catalogue of the Correspondence and Papers of the Niger Coast Protectorate, 268 3/3/3, p. 240. National Archives of Nigeria Enugu.
- Girshick, Paula Ben-Amos; Thornton, John (2001). "Civil War in the Kingdom of Benin, 1689–1721: Continuity or Political Change?". The Journal of African History. 42 (3): 353–376. doi:10.1017/S0021853701007915. hdl:2022/3613. JSTOR 3647167. S2CID 145691565.
- Graham, James D. (1965). "The slave trade, depopulation and human sacrifice in Benin history: the general approach" (PDF). Cahiers d'Études africaines. 5 (18): 317–334. doi:10.3406/cea.1965.3035. JSTOR 4390897. S2CID 143678155. Archived from the original (PDF) on 26 February 2020.
- Igbafe, Philip A. (1970). "The fall of Benin: a reassessment". Journal of African History. 11 (3): 385–400. doi:10.1017/S0021853700010215. JSTOR 180345. S2CID 154621156.
- J.R. Phillips to Foreign Office. Advising the deposition of the Benin King. 17 November 1896. Despatches to Foreign Office from Consul-General, Catalogue of the Correspondence and Papers of the Niger Coast Protectorate, 268 3/3/3, p. 240. National Archives of Nigeria Enugu.
- Sir Ralph Moore to Foreign Office. Reporting on the abortive Expedition into Benin. 1895 Sep 12 Catalogue of the Correspondence and Papers of the Niger Coast Protectorate, 268 3/3/3, p. 240. National Archives of Nigeria Enugu
- Ogundiran, Akinwumi (2020). The Yoruba: A New History. Indiana University Press.
- Strayer, Robert W. (2013). Ways of the World: A Brief Global History with Sources (2nd ed.). New York: Bedford/St.Martin's. ISBN 978-0-312-58346-0.
- Ryder, Alan Frederick Charles (1969). Benin and the Europeans, (1485–1897). London: Longmans. OCLC 959073935.
- Thornton, John Kelly (1999). Warfare in Atlantic Africa, 1500–1800. Psychology Press. ISBN 978-1-85728-392-1.
- Usuanlele, Uyilawa; Edo, Victor Osaro (2007). "Migrating out of reach: fugitive Benin communities in colonial Nigeria, 1897–1934". In Kolapo, Femi James; Akurang-Parry, Kwabena (eds.). African agency and European colonialism: latitudes of negotiation and containment: essays in honor of A.S. Kanya-Forstner. University Press of America. ISBN 978-0-7618-3846-3.
