= Ogun =

Deity of war, iron and blacksmiths in the Yoruba religion

- Warriors; Soldiers; Blacksmiths; Metal workers; Craftsmen; Law; Order; Roads; Battles; Battle camps; Metals; Agriculture; Hunting; Technology; Rum
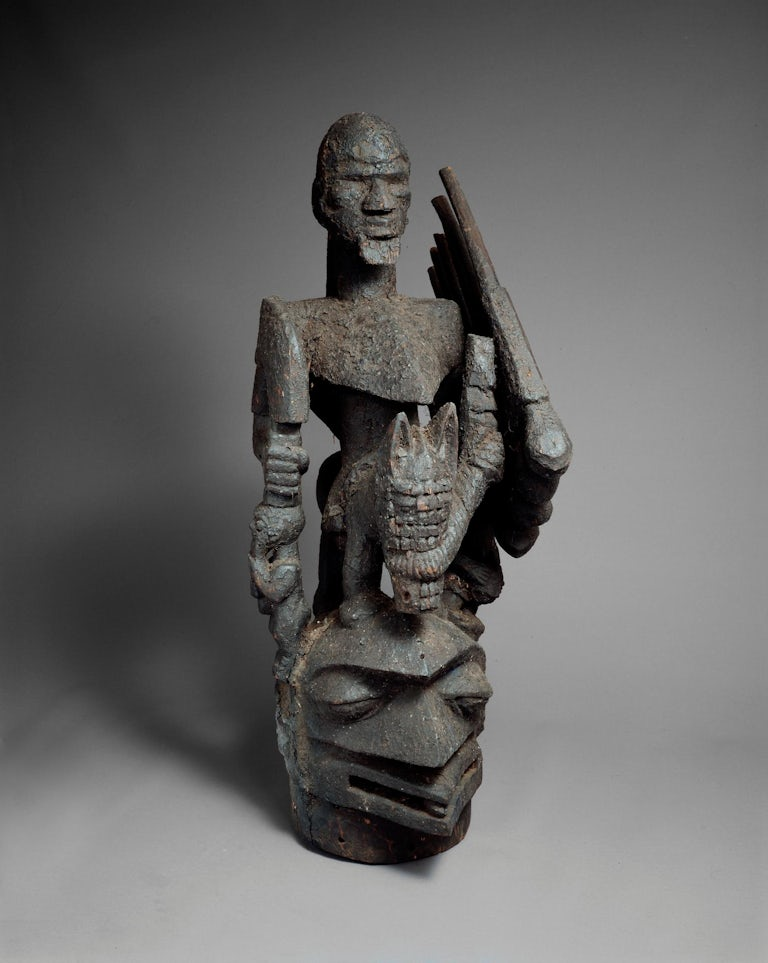
- Ogun Helmet Mask used in rituals (20th century).
- Other names: Oggun; Ogou; Ògún; Gou; Ogúm; Aládá Méjì; Ọṣìn Imalẹ̀; Onire; Alágbẹ̀dẹ
- Venerated in: Yoruba religion, Edo religion, Dahomean religion, Vodun, Santería, Batuque, Umbanda, Candomblé, Arará, Quimbanda, Kélé, Haitian Vodou, Louisiana Voodoo, Trinidad Orisha, Folk Catholicism, Dominican Vudu
- Region: Nigeria, Benin, Latin America, Haiti, United States, Togo, Ghana
- Festivals: Ogun Festival; Ọlọjọ Festival

Equivalents
- Catholicism: Saint Michael

Veve of Ogoun

Ogun is a Yoruba deity associated with iron, metalworking and war in the traditional religions of some West African peoples, including the Yoruba, Edo and Itsekiri. Ogun also appears in religions of the African diaspora.

== Historical development ==
Several historians, ethnographers and African history experts such as Curnow and Verger identify the origin of Ogun with the Yoruba people. They also note its diffusion, dispersal or 'borrowing' from the Yoruba into multiple neighbouring West African and New World religions.

According to Sandra T. Barnes, the precise time and place at which Ogun emerged as a deity are uncertain. She discusses older, widely shared ideas about sacred iron, killing and ritual purification, alongside suggestions linking his emergence to warfare in eastern Yorubaland and the Benin Kingdom and to hunting traditions in central and western Yorubaland, especially in the Oyo Empire. These suggestions include a sixteenth-century emergence in eastern Yorubaland and possible earlier evidence from a Benin ceremony dated to the thirteenth or fourteenth century involving ritual battles and sacrifices. Barnes stresses that the evidence for the proposed dates and places is circumstantial and does not specifically name Ogun. She describes his origins as indeterminate and favours studying how Ogun traditions developed through the combination and reworking of ideas.

In discussing Ogun's popularity in the twentieth century, Barnes notes that evidence of its growth comes primarily from Southwest Nigeria.

== Yoruba religion ==
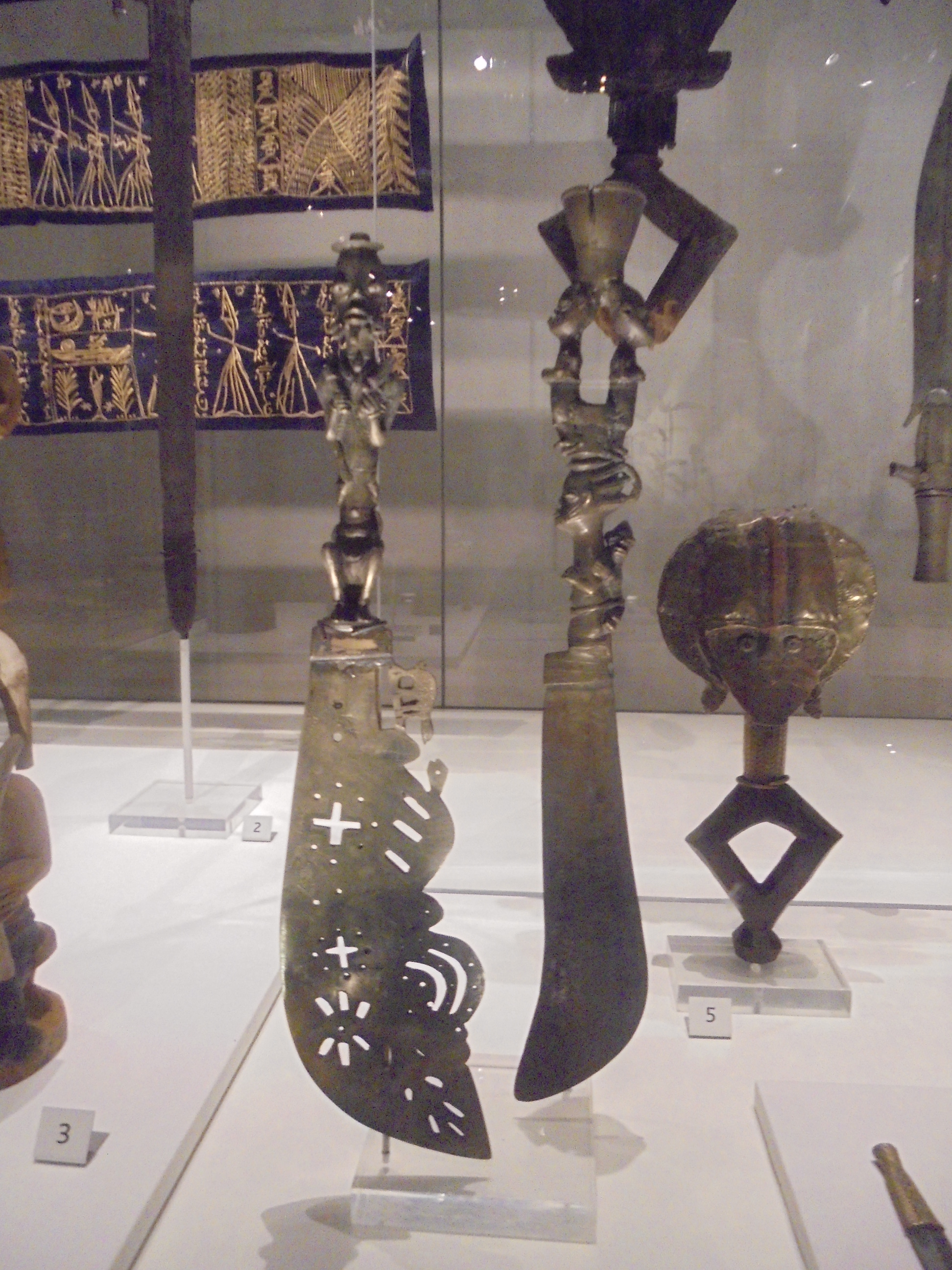
Ada Ogun (Ogun's sword)

In Yoruba religion, Ogun (Yoruba: Ògún) is an Irunmọlẹ (primordial orisha) in Yorubaland. In some traditions, he is said to have cleared a path for the other orisha to enter Earth, using a metal machete and with the assistance of a dog. To commemorate this, one of his oriki, or epithets, is Osin Imole or the "first of the primordial Orisha to come to Earth". He is the god of war and metals.

In his earthly life Ogun is said to have been the first king of Ire. According to some stories, when some of his subjects failed to show respect, Ogun killed them and ultimately himself with his own sword. His followers believe him to have wọ ilẹ sun, to have disappeared into the earth's surface instead of dying. He disappeared into the earth at a place called Ire-Ekiti, with the promise to help those who call on his name. Throughout his earthly life, he is thought to have fought for the people of Ire, thus is known also as Onire.

In an Ile-Ife tradition commemorated at the Ọlọ́jọ́ Festival, Ogun seized the throne of the Ife Empire after the demise of Ọbàtálá, who reigned twice, before and after Oduduwa, but was ousted by Ọbalufọn and expelled from the site of the present palace.

He is now celebrated in Ogun, Ekiti, Oyo, and Ondo States.

=== Followers ===
Ogun is the traditional deity of warriors, hunters, blacksmiths, technologists, and drivers in the Yoruba religion. Followers of traditional Yoruba religion can swear to tell the truth in court by "kissing a piece of iron in the name of Ogun." Drivers carry an amulet of Ogun to ward off traffic accidents.

=== Symbols ===
The primary symbols of Ogun are iron, the dog, and the palm frond. They symbolize Ogun's role in transformation, mediation, and function. Iron is the primary emblem of Ogun. Ogun altars and ceremonies display and use iron objects both in Yoruba areas and across the African diaspora. Followers of Ogun wear chains of iron implements; Ogun festivals feature the display of knives, guns, blacksmith implements, scissors, wrenches, and other iron implements from daily life.

=== Sacrifice ===
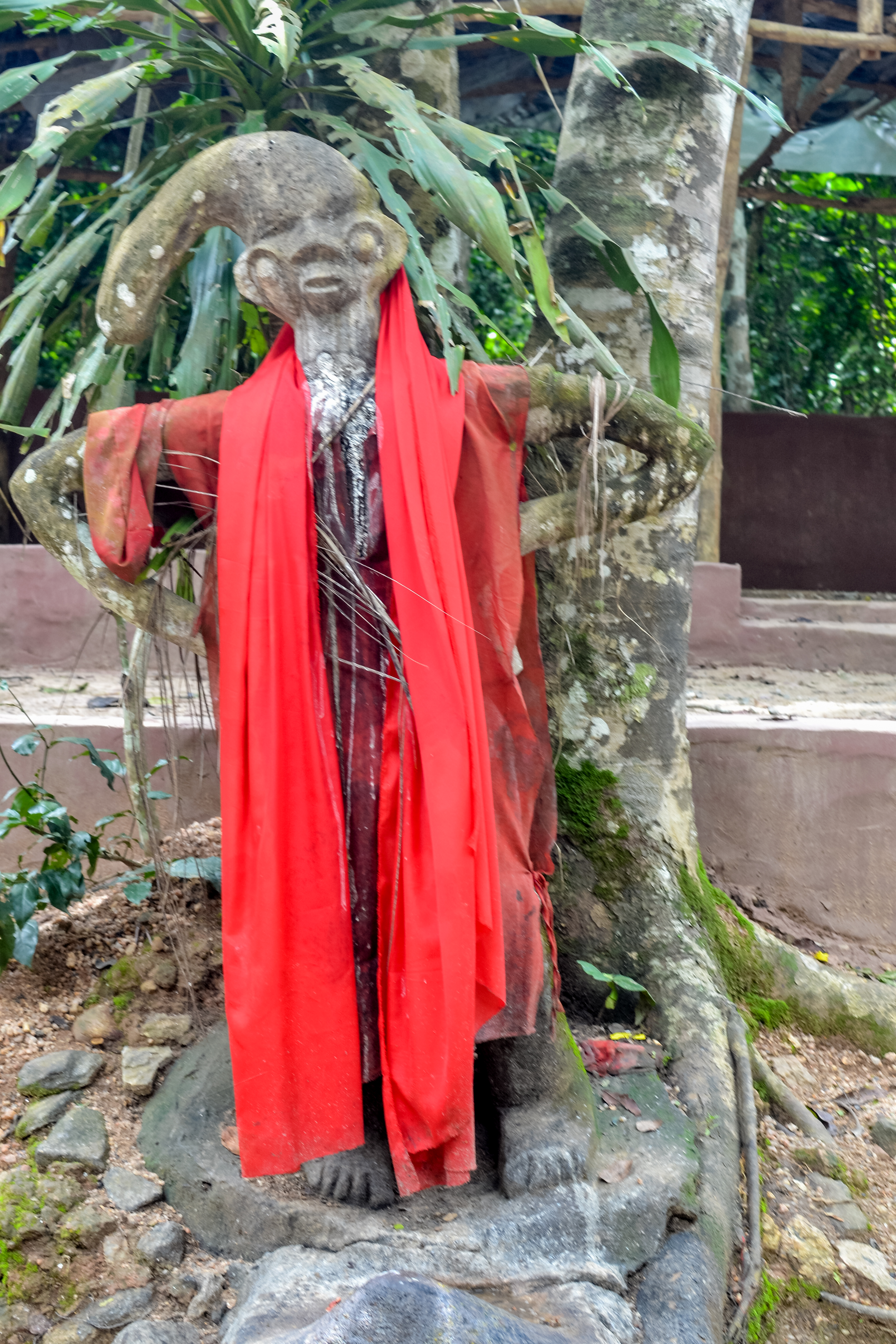
Statue of Ogun, Osun-Osogbo, Osogbo, Nigeria

Meats are sacrifices for Ogun. Dogs are the traditional companions of hunters, but Ogun's personality is also seen as "doglike": aggressive, able to face danger, and straightforward. Other sacrificial animals associated with Ogun are the spitting cobra (blacksnake); its behavior is aggressive and fearless. Hunters and blacksmiths avoid eating or witnessing the mating of blacksnakes. Other important sacrificial offerings to Ogun are the Clarias submarginatus (a species of catfish), alligator pepper, kola nuts, palm wine and red palm oil, small rats, roosters, salt, snails, tortoise, water, and yams. Many of these sacrificial offerings were carried into New World traditions.

Oríkì is a Yoruba cultural phenomenon that comes in the form of praise poetry, praising either a person, òrìṣà (deity), or town based on their achievements. Ogun worshippers are known to sing Ogun's oríkì and this specific part insinuates that Ògún is in seven paths.

- Ògún méje l'ògún mi,
- Ògún alára ni ń gb’ajá,
- Ògún onírè á gb’àgbò,
- Ògún Ìkọlà á gbà'gbín,
- Ògún gbẹ́nàgbẹ́nà oje igí nìí mu,
- Ògún ìlá á gb’ẹ̀sun iṣu,
- Ògún akìrin á gbà'wo àgbò,
- Ògún ẹlẹ́mọ̀nà ẹran ahùn ní jẹ,
- Mákindé ti d'ògún lẹ́yìn odi,
- Bí ò bá gba Tápà á gb’Àbókí,
- Á gba Úkù-úkù á gba Kémbèrí.

Translation:

- My Ògún manifests in seven different ways
- Ogun of the town of Aramoko accepts a dog atonement
- Ogun of the town of Ire accepts a ram atonement
- Ogun of the surgery accepts a snail atonement
- Ogun of woodcarvers drinks tree sap for atonement
- Ogun of the town of Ila accept roasted yam atonement
- Ogun of the Akirin people accepts ram for atonement
- Ogun of Elemona eats tortoise meat for atonement
- Makinde that wages foreign wars beyond the city walls —
- Will consume either Nupe, or Hausa,
- Will consume foreign people, he will consume the Kambari too.

== Edo religion ==
In Edo religion, Ogun is regarded as a son of Osanobua and the patron of people who work with or use metal, including blacksmiths, brass and bronze casters, warriors, hunters, farmers and vehicle drivers. He is also regarded as one who "opens the way", enabling other deities and ancestors to act effectively. Devotees may keep shrines to him, and priests hold annual festivals in his honour. Ben-Amos and Kaplan describe Ogun as an important deity in Edo religious practice. In Benin shrines, Ogun is depicted in war dress with tools and weapons associated with these roles. Kathy Curnow states that Ogun was borrowed from the neighbouring Yoruba people and has been an essential component of Benin religion for over half a millennium.

== Dahomean religion ==
In Dahomean religion, Gu is the vodun of war and patron deity of smiths and craftsmen. He was sent to earth to make it a suitable place for men to live happily, and he has not yet finished this task. In Dahomean ritual, Gu is regarded as a deity of Nago (Yoruba) origin. He governed over war, iron, and fire, so he was invoked in making weapons, and metal-smithing.

== Ewe religion ==
In Ewe religion, Gu, also pronounced Egu, is the god of war and craftsmen especially blacksmiths.

Worshippers of Gu are not supposed to keep dogs as pets. Menstruating women are also forbidden to touch the tools of the blacksmith. Adherents periodically make offerings of palm nuts, food and pour libations to Gu. Metal objects are also often purchased for offering in shrines dedicated to Gu.

== Candomblé ==
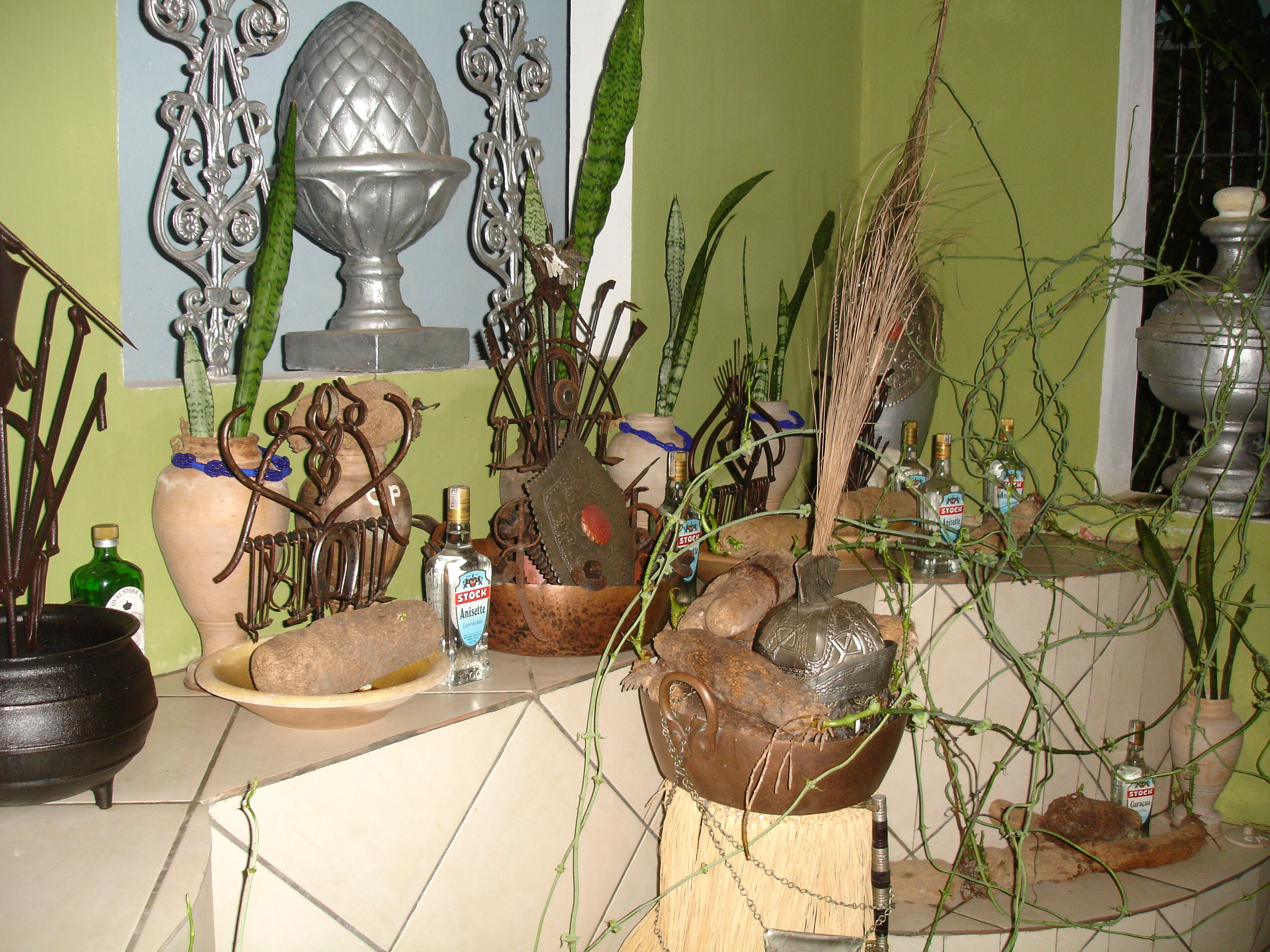
Candomblé altar to Ogun, Brazil

Ogun is known in the Afro-Brazilian tradition of Candomblé as Ogum (Ketu, Ijexa and Efon nations) or Gu (Jeje nation). Ogum is syncretized with Saint George, notably in Rio de Janeiro and the state of Rio Grande do Sul. Candomblé tradition in Northeast Brazil, especially in Bahia, associates Ogum with Saint Sebastian or Saint Anthony.

=== Characteristics ===
- Consecrated day: Tuesday
- Metal: iron
- Element: earth
- Color: red, black, green (Rio de Janeiro), blue (Bahia), marine blue
- Food: feijoada, xinxim, yams
- Archetype: impetuous, authoritarian, cautious, hardworking, suspicious and a bit selfish
- Symbols: sword, broadsword, iron chain

Individual devotees of Ogun in Brazil avoid certain foods. These include goat, cajá-manga (Spondias dulcis), sugar, black beans, yams, and the manga-espada (an elongated mango cultivar of Brazil) in the Ketu nation; yams and manga-espada in the Ijexa nation; and partridge in the Jeje nation.

=== Ritual sacrifice ===
Ogun, as a male orisha (Boró), only "eats" male animals. Ox, billy goat, rooster, snake (typically a red snake), dog and game animals are sacrificed ("orô") on festival days associated with Ogum in the Candomblé tradition. Léo Neto, et al. observed various kinds of animals used in sacrificial ritual in twelve Candomblé communities of Caruaru, Pernambuco and Campina Grande, Paraíba in the Northeastern region of Brazil between August 2007 and June 2008; dogs were the only sacrificial animal offered to Ogun in both communities.

=== Ritual foods ===
Acaçá is a ritual food offered to all gods in the Candomble pantheon; it is made of a paste of corn mash steamed in banana leaves. A variation, acaçá de feijão-preto, substitutes black beans (Phaseolus vulgaris) for corn. This variation is only offered to Ogum in the Casa Fanti Ashanti temple in São Luís, in the state of Maranhão. Feijoada, a stew of beans with beef and pork, is also a common offering to Ogum.

== Santería and Palo ==
Ogun's centrality to the Yoruba religion has resulted in his name being retained in Santería religion, as well as the Shango religion of Trinidad and Tobago. In Santería, Ogún is syncretized with Saint Peter, James the Great, Saint Paul, Saint Michael the Archangel, and John the Baptist; he is the deity of war and metals. In Palo, Ogun is associated with the mpungu (divinity), Zarabanda.

== Vodou ==
In Haitian Vodou Ogun is known as Ogou and consists of an array of manifestations; most carry the aspect of iron smithing and tools from the Yoruba tradition. The Ogou guard the badji, the sacred altar of the Vodou temple. He carries an iron saber and wears a red sash. Ogou is also the god of pioneering, intelligence, justice, medicine, and political power; these are associated with the symbol of the tool that can "advance humans' mastery over the environment". Ogou Feray is the god of war. Other manifestations of Ogou are Ogou Badagri, Ogou Balenjo, Ogou Batala, and Ogou Je Wouj. Ezili Dantor is the female counterpart to Ogou.

Ogou Feray is syncretized with St. James the Greater (St. Jacques Majeur) in the Vodou tradition. He is a flower spirit and he guides Vodou followers against their enemies. He is symbolically covered in iron and may not be harmed by his enemies. As in Africa, his symbol is a piece of iron, a machete, or a knife. As in Africa, Ogou is revered among blacksmiths, many of whom are of Yoruba origin. He is also noted to like women and alcohol.

In Vodou ceremonies followers of Ogou wear a red shirt, pants, and scarf. A follower of Ogou in a possession-trance is offered Haitian white rum during the ceremony. In some ceremonies rum is burned in a container to allow Ogou to "wash" the hands of the followers.

Two Vodou songs to Ogou, as recorded and translated by Michel S. Laguerre:

Fè Ogou Fè, Ogou Fèray o,

Fè Ogou Fè, Ogou Fèray o

I am iron,

I am covered with iron.

Fèrè Fèray tout ko Fèray sé kouto,

Fèrè Fèray tout ko Fèray sé manchèt.

The body of Ogou Fèray is covered with knives,

The body of Fèray is covered with machetes.

== Umbanda ==
In Umbanda, he is syncretized with Saint George, Saint Michael, Saint Anthony, Saint John, Saint Peter, Saint Paul, Saint James the Great and Tubal-cain, and is the male and universal Orisha of the Law of God, responsible for giving law and correction for all humans, who polarizes with Iansã (natural pair of Divine Law), Egunitá (pair of the role of Divine Law) and Yemanjá (energetic pair).

== In popular culture ==
- Ogun is honored in the song "Ogum", originally recorded by Zeca Pagodinho in 2008, also honoring Saint George, with whom he is syncretized.
- In 2022, Brazilian rapper Criolo released the song "Ogum Ogum" in partnership with Cape Verdean singer Mayra Andrade, with whom he performed at Rock in Rio that year.
- In the second part of the 1964 novel Shepherds of the Night by the Brazilian modernist writer Jorge Amado, Ogun is a major protagonist. He baptizes a blond, blue-eyed child, whom the Negro has already recognized as his son.
- Ogun is a major antagonist in Akogun: Brutalizer of Gods, a comic series written by Murewa Ayodele.
- Ogun was voiced by Amuche Chukudebelu in the second season of the American animated series Castlevania: Nocturne.
- Ogun is a recurring "demon" in the Shin Megami Tensei video game series.

== Bibliography ==
- Clyne, Robert Marcel (1998). Ogun Worship in Idanre: Iron and Identity in a Yoruba Town (Ph.D. thesis). Yale University.
