= Olojo festival =

Annual festival in Ife, Osun State, Nigeria

Ọlọjọ
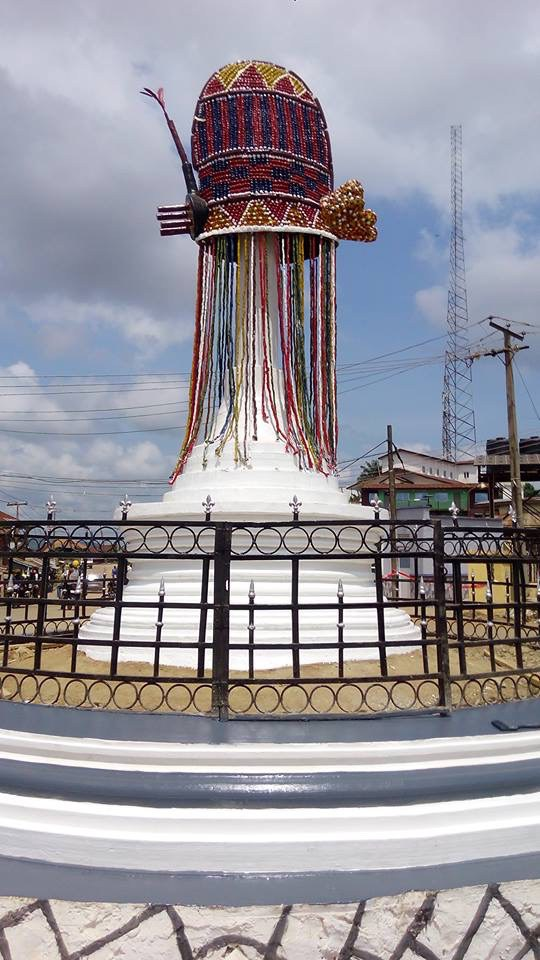
- The Aare crown model in Ife before Olojo celebrations
- Official name: Ọdun Ọlọjọ
- Observed by: Ooni of Ife; Ife natives Yoruba people
- Type: Cultural, Religious, Historical
- Significance: Veneration of Ogun; First day of dawn Ade Aare crown Well-being of Yorubaland
- Date: October
- Duration: 7 days seclusion by Ooni; 7th day appearance and public rites
- Frequency: Annually (September / October)
- First time: 12th century CE
- Last time: 2026
- Started by: Ooni Ogun (3rd); Ooni Oranmiyan (6th)
- Related to: Edi (Moremi) festival Itapa (Obatala) festival Ogun festivals of Yorubaland

Olojo lit. 'day of the first dawn' in Yoruba is an ancient festival celebrated annually in Ife, Osun State, Nigeria. In Yoruba cosmology, Ife is seen as the place from which dawn begins; Ibi tí Ojúmọ́ ti ń mọ́, as well as the 'source' of all humanity; Orírun ayé. Tradition also holds Ile-Ife as the cultural cradle of the wider region, the city of survivors, and land of the ancients. Olojo is one of the most popular festivals in Yorubaland, and its name is in reference to the grateful heart of man for the gift of Olodumare's creation and the existence of humanity through the celebration of the first day of dawn. Ooni Ojaja II, Oba Ogunwusi once described it as "a festival that celebrates the Black race all over the world".

The Olojo Festival is one of the cultural festivals in the traditional events calendar of the Ile-Ife. It is the celebration of the remembrance of “Ogun”, god of war and Iron, who is believed to be the first son of Oduduwa, progenitor of the Yoruba people. The festival is held annually in September/October. Although, in 2019 it was observed in February.

== Order of events ==
Olojo begins in Ife with the Ooni, king of Ife's entry into seclusion and denial for seven days to commune with the ancestors and pray for the wel-being of his people and kingdom. This is to make him pure and ensure the efficacy of his prayers. The king then appears on the seventh day in public with the Are crown (King’s Crown), which is believed to be the original crown used by Oduduwa to lead a procession of traditional chiefs and priests to perform at the shrine of Ogun. However, before the Ooni emerges, women from his maternal and paternal families sweep the royal palace, symbolically ridding it of all evil.

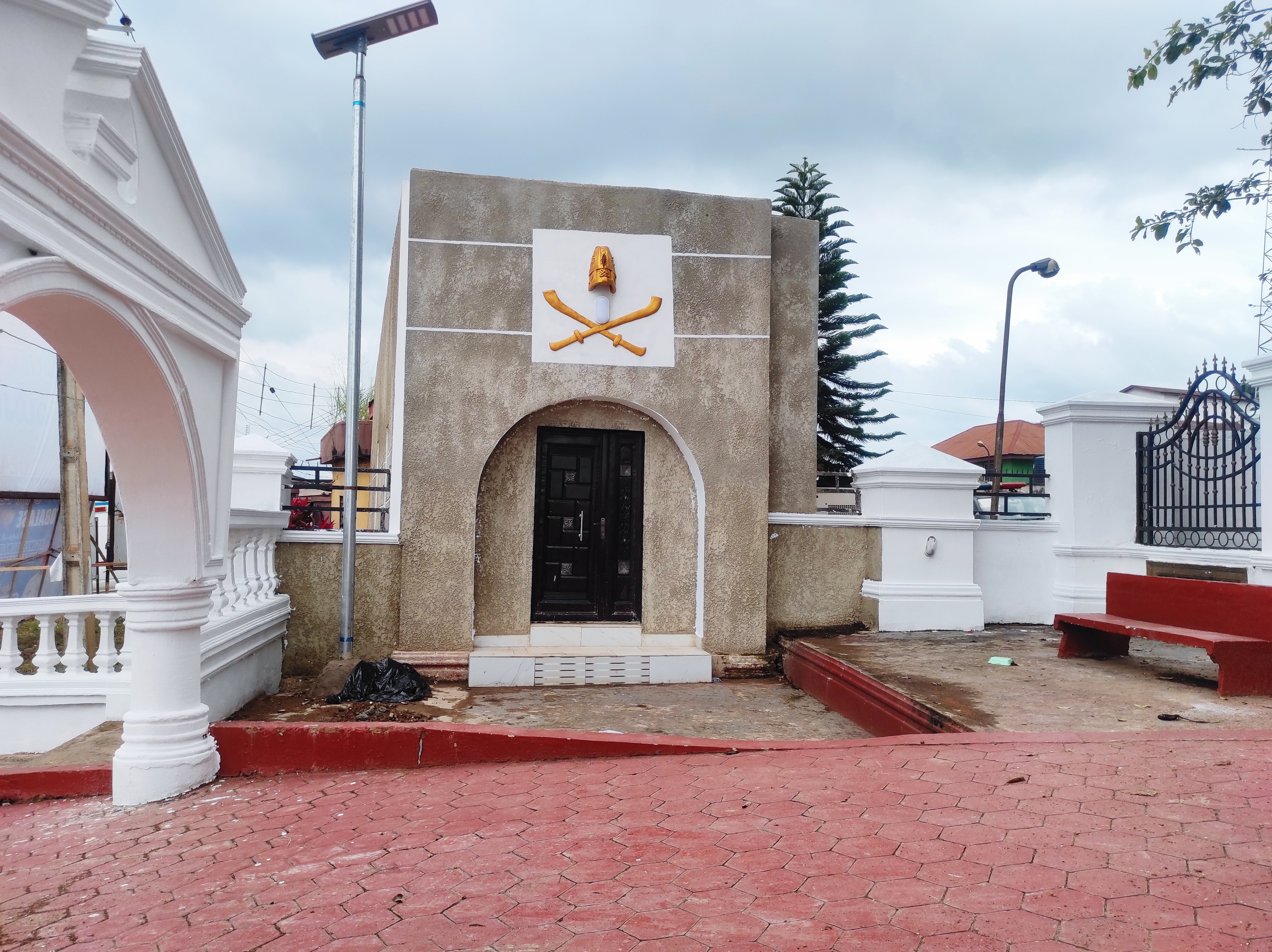
Oke-Mogun shrine in Ife

Entrance into the Oke-Mogun grove

The next stage of the ceremony is leading the awaiting crowd of people to the Okemogun’s shrine. Here, he performs sacred duties including oath renewal. He then moves to the foot of the historic Oketase hill of Orunmila, where the annual divination is done for him at by the Araba chief priest. At the shrine, traditional Chiefs arrive with the Ife swords of office marked with chalk (ẹfun) and camwood (osùn). They are garbed in ceremonial attire and dance to rhythms from the Bembe, a traditional drum. The drums, style of drumming and singing for each chief is different, and only the Ooni can dance to the drum called Osirigi.

Olojo has remained popular in Ife because of the history and legends attacked to it. It connotes the day of the year specially blessed by Olodumare, creator of the Universe. Olojo can also be translated as; "Owner for the day". Prayers are offered for peace, unity and tranquility in Yorubaland and Nigeria at large. All age groups are allowed to participate.

== Gallery ==
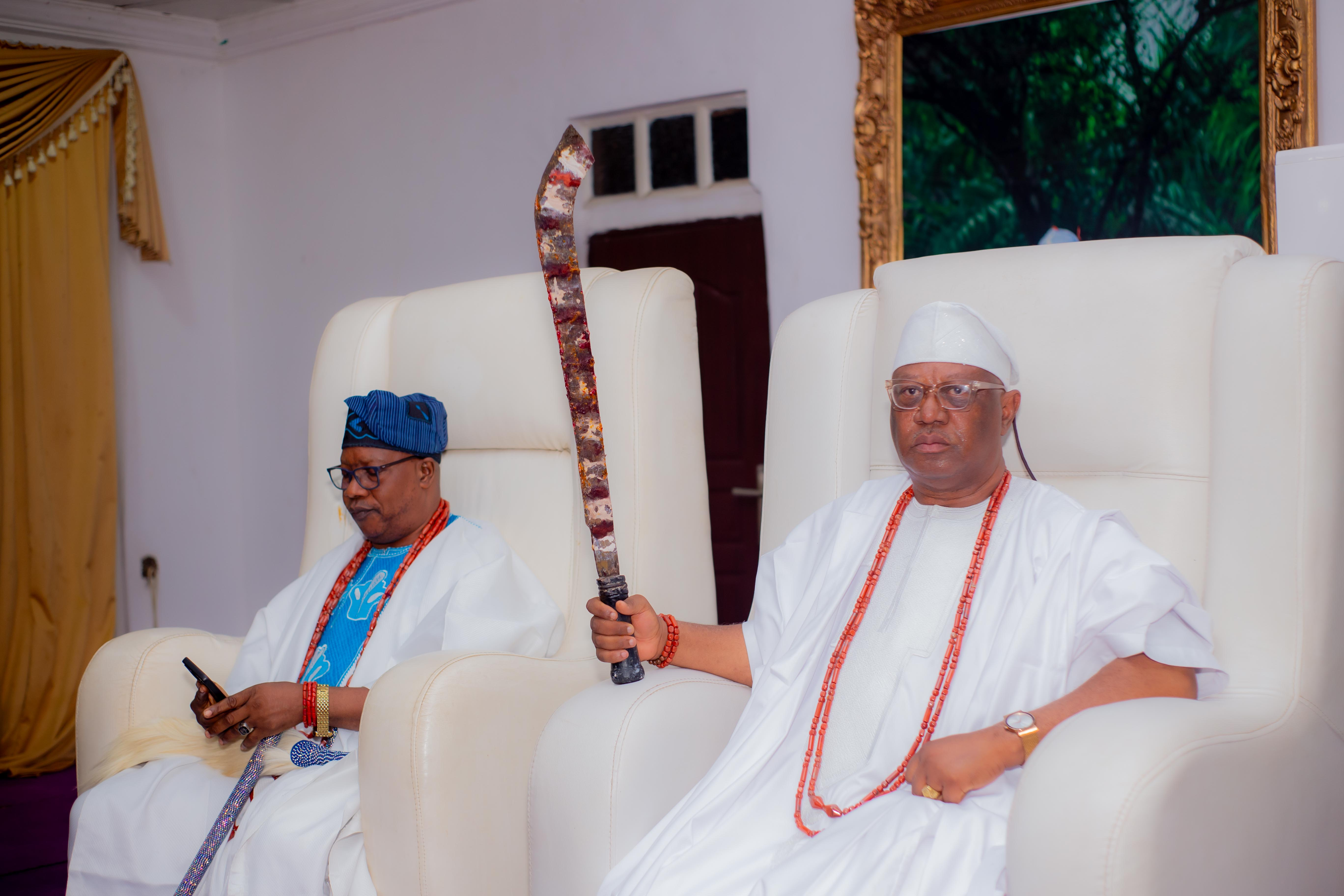

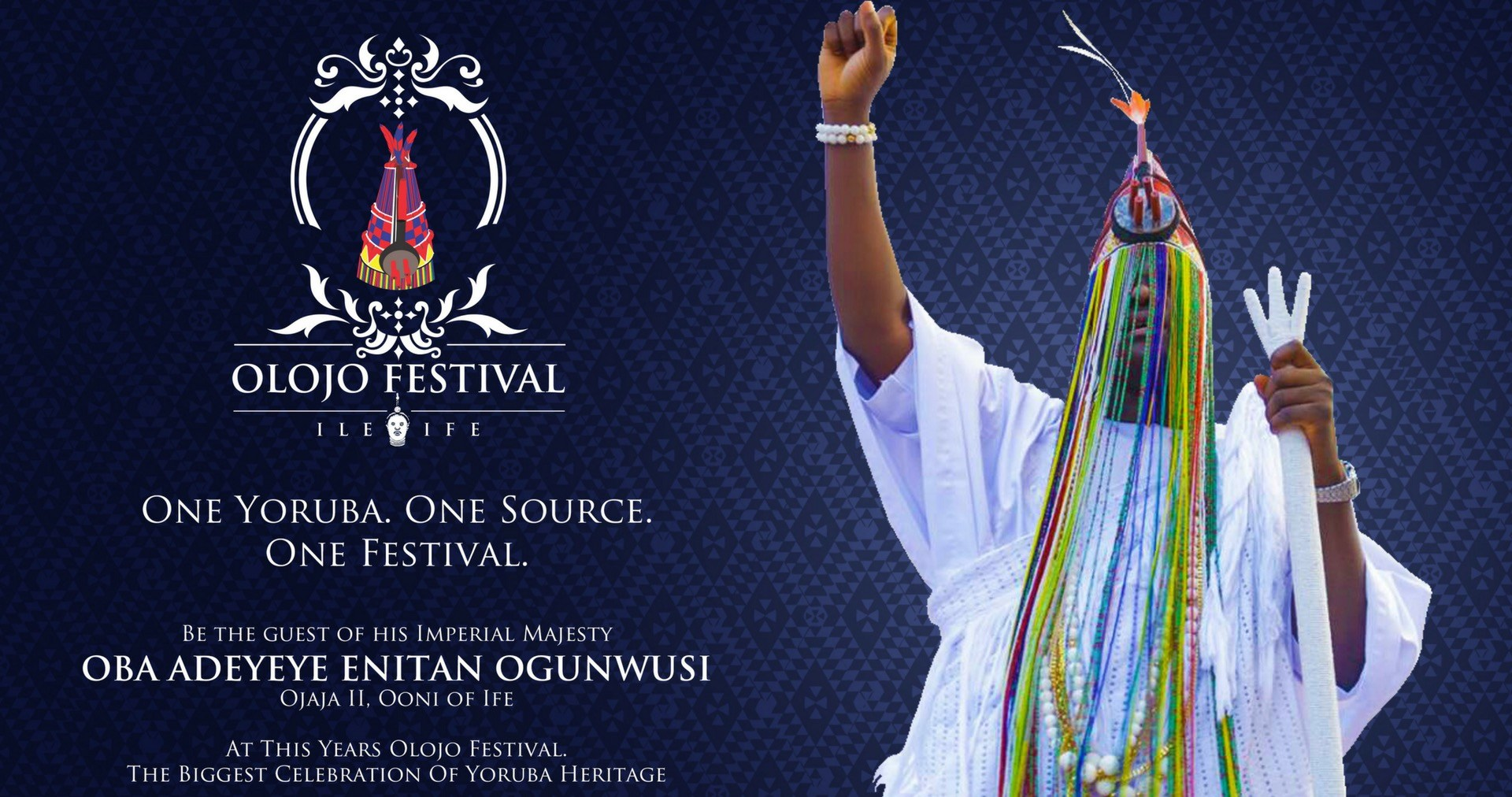

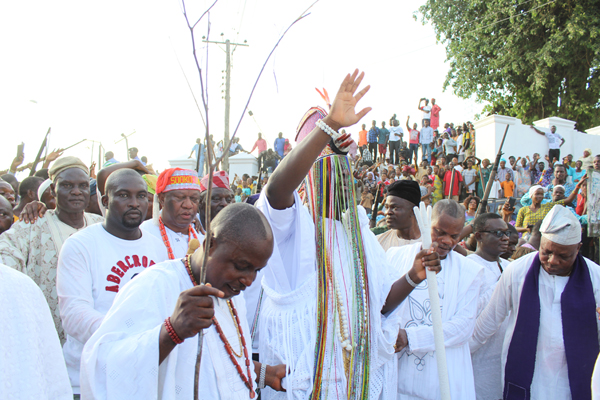

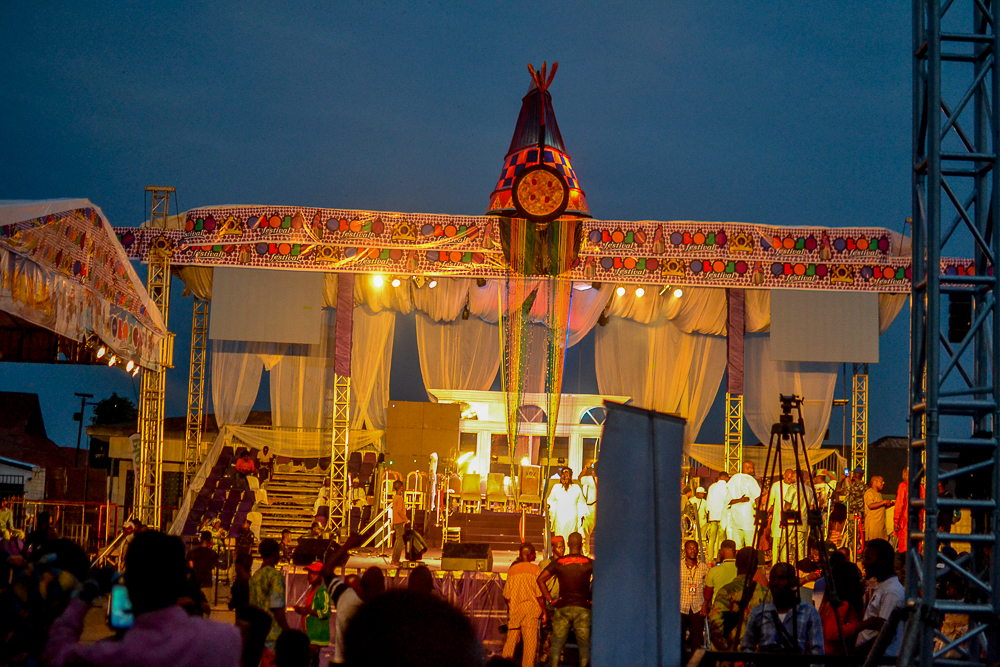

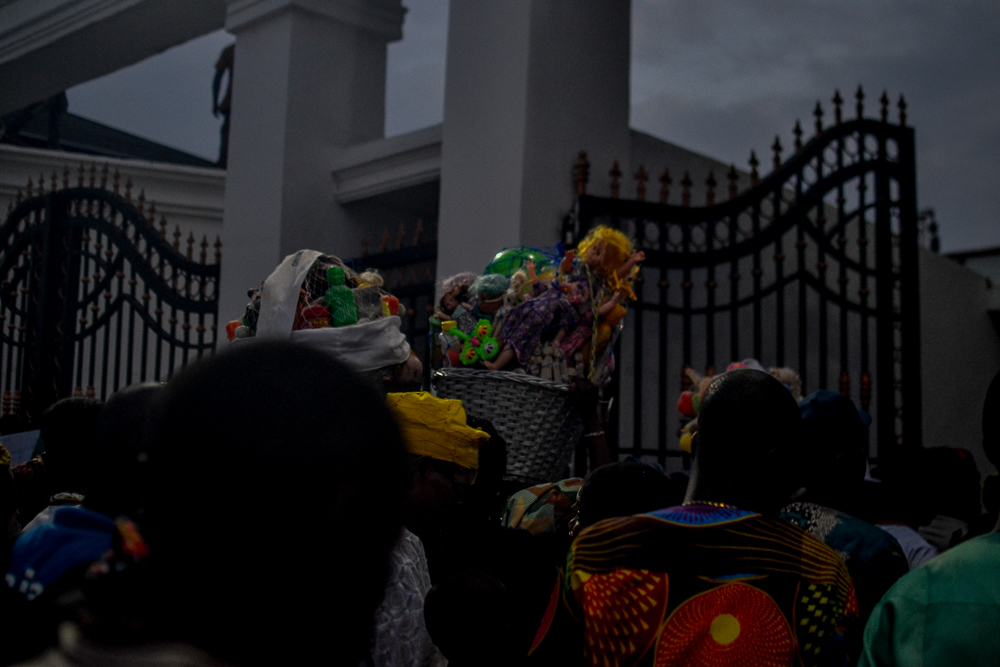

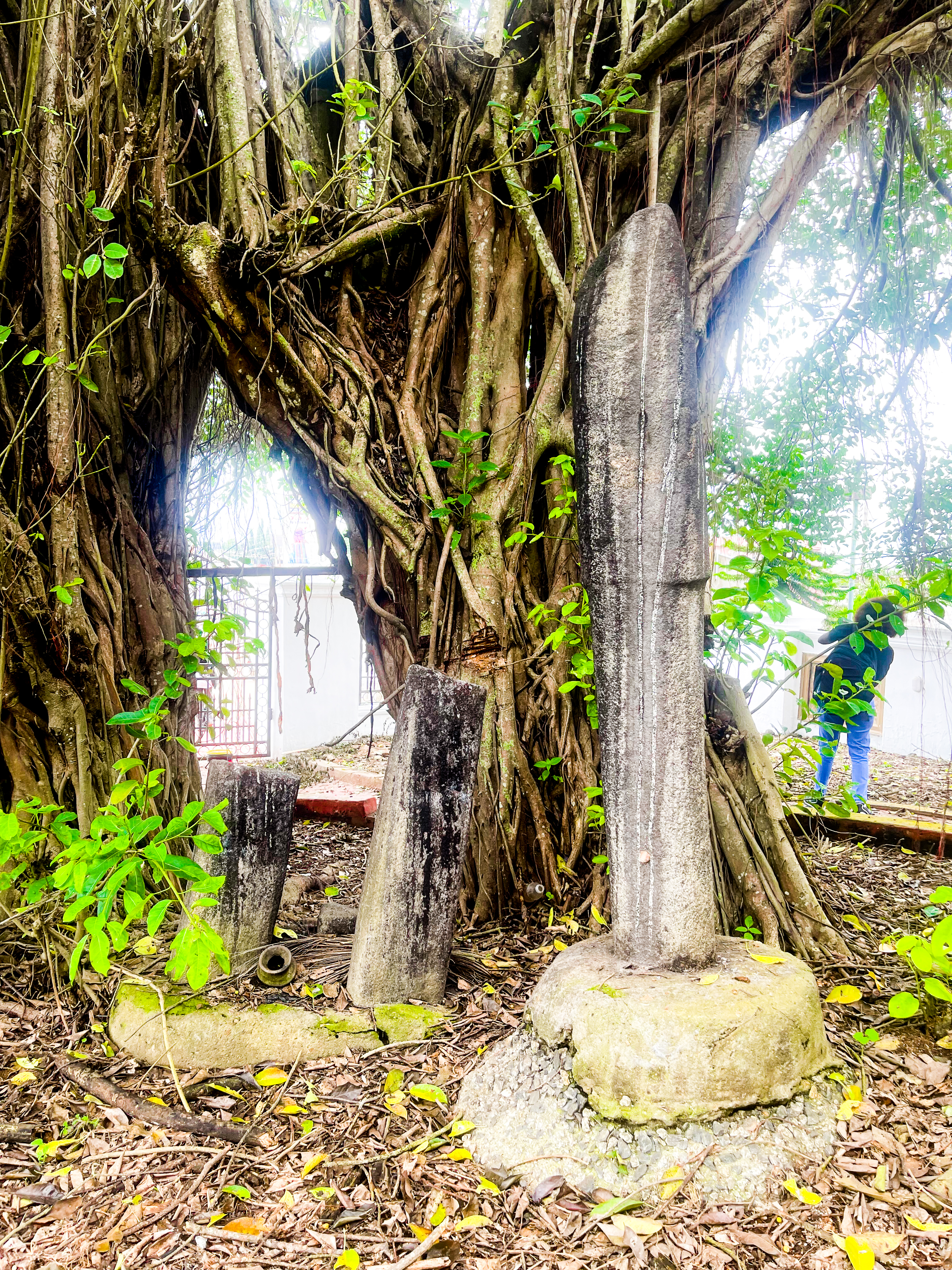

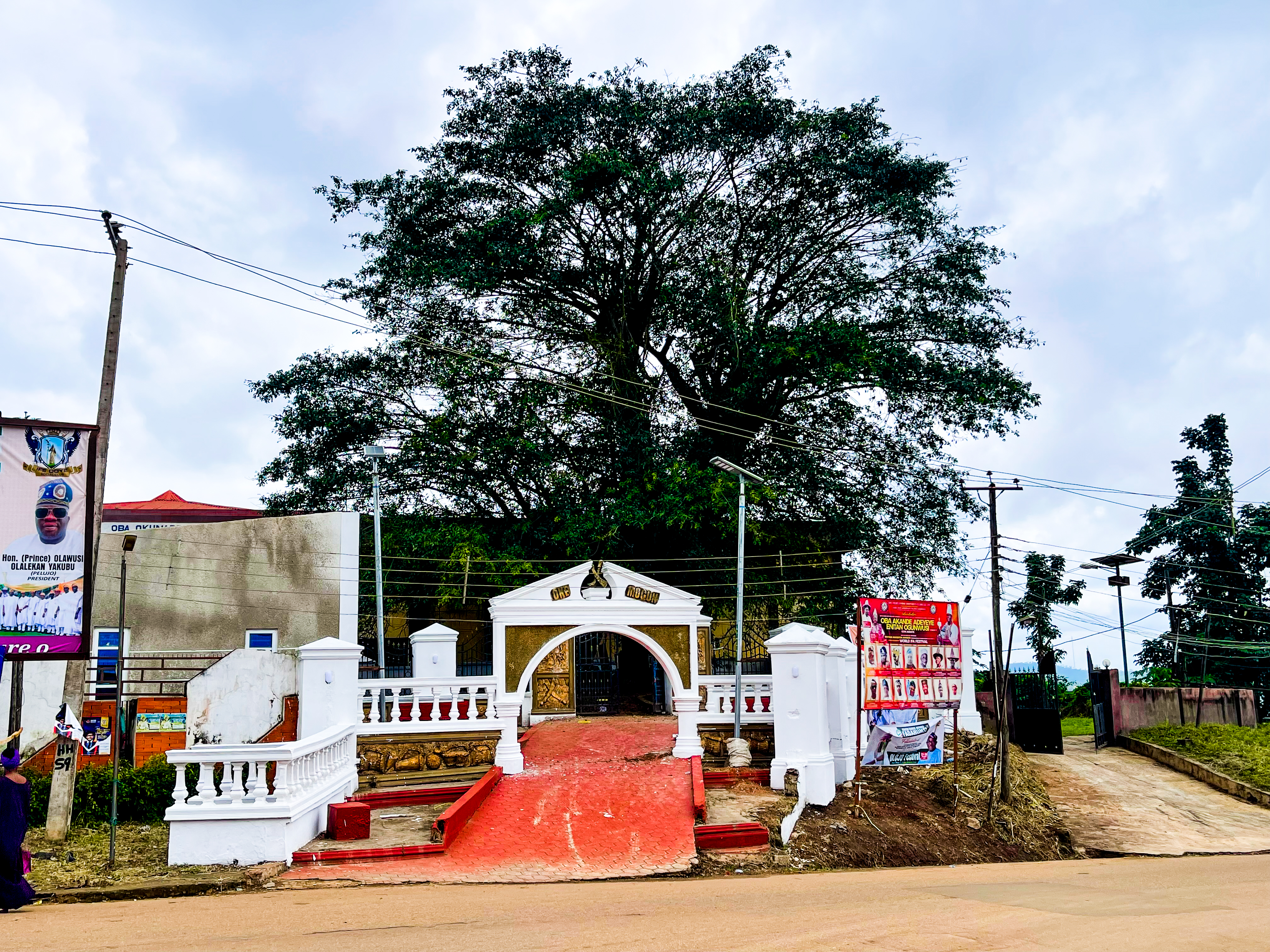

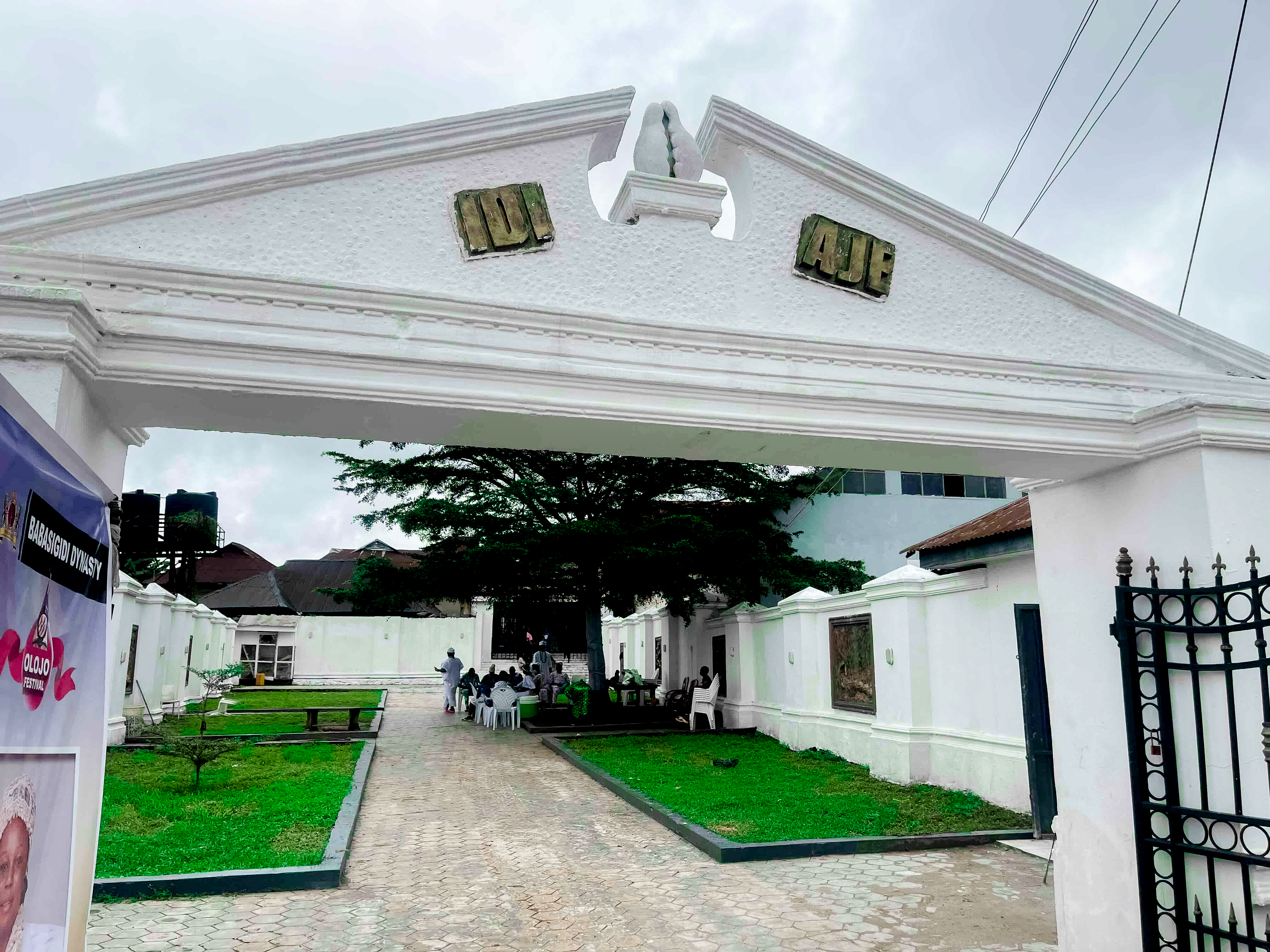

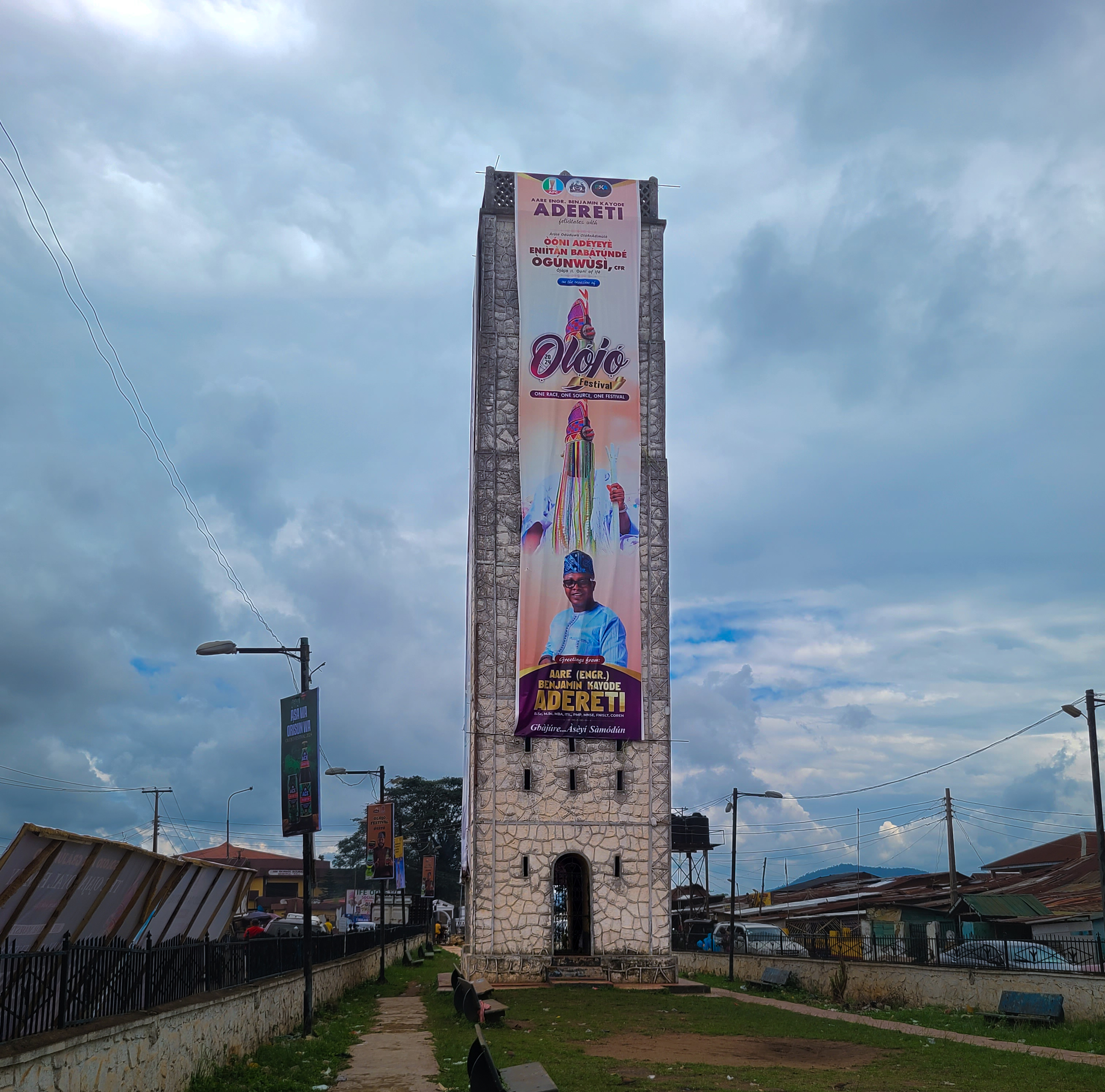

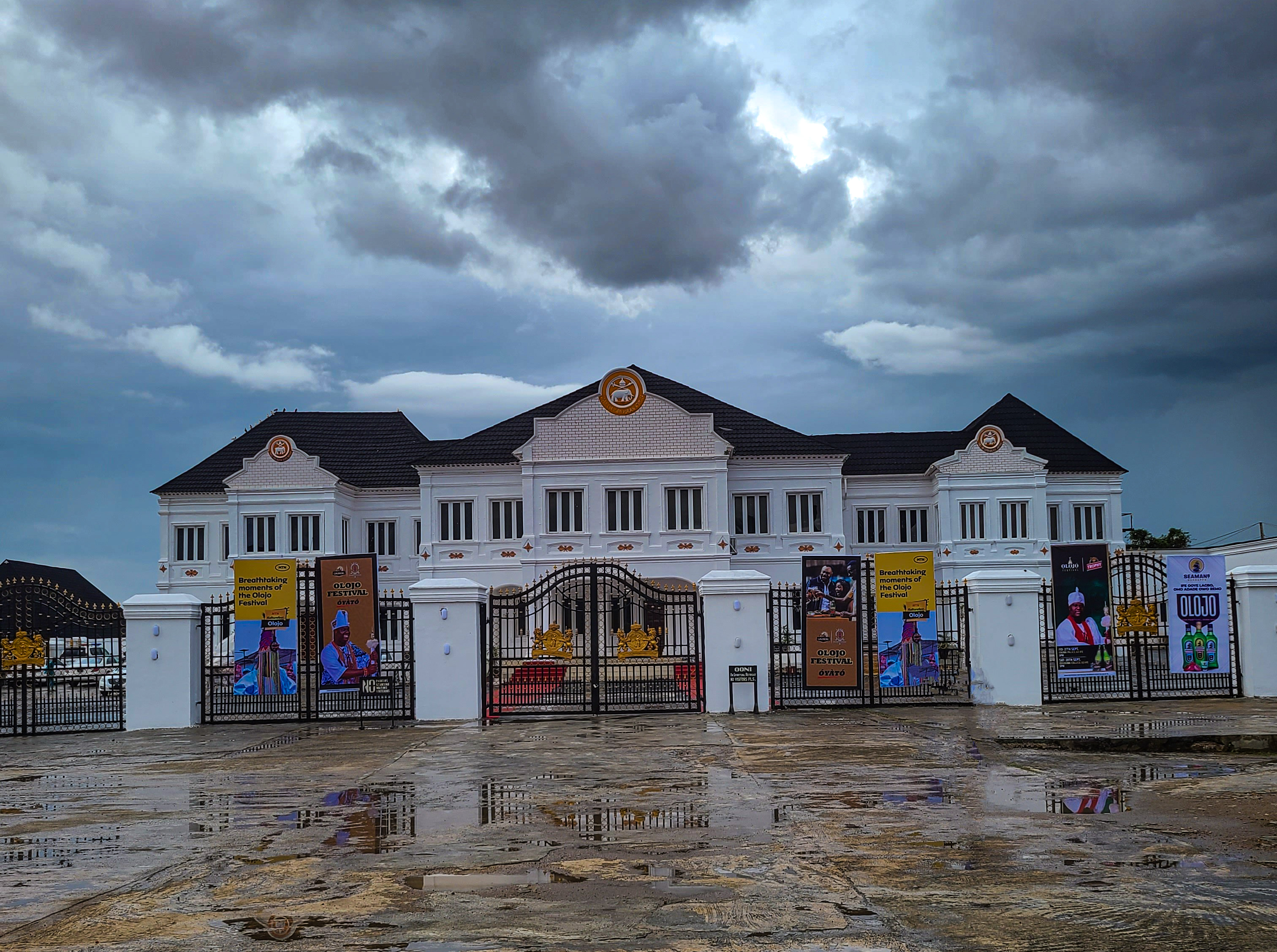

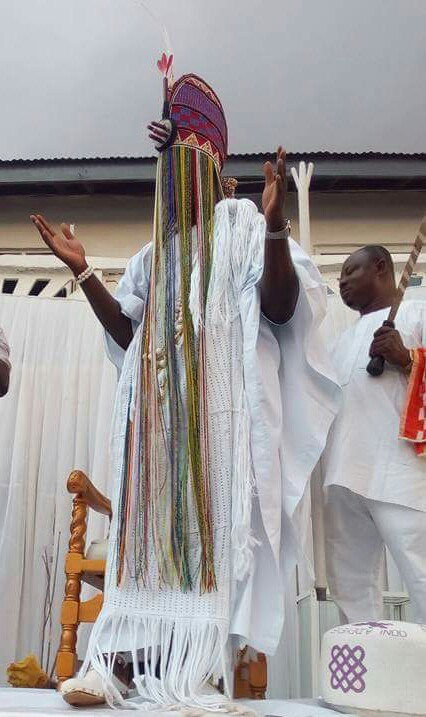

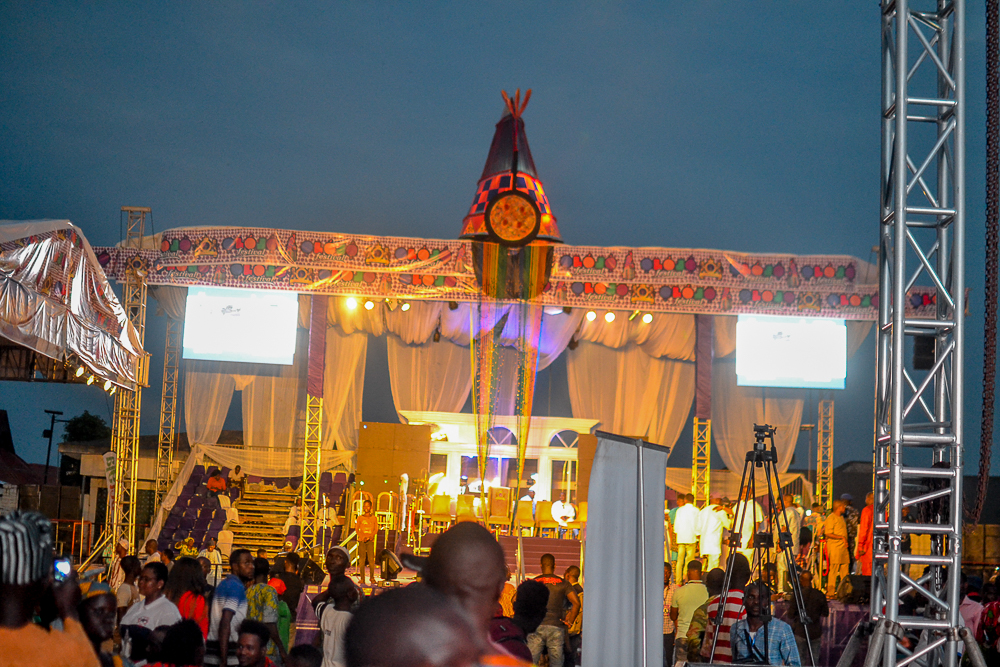

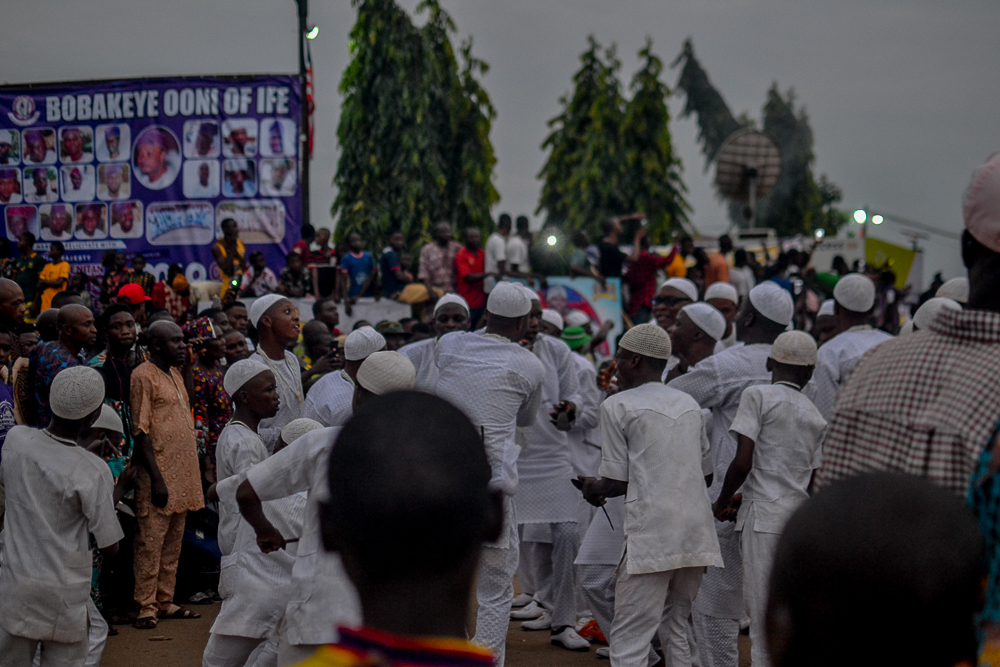

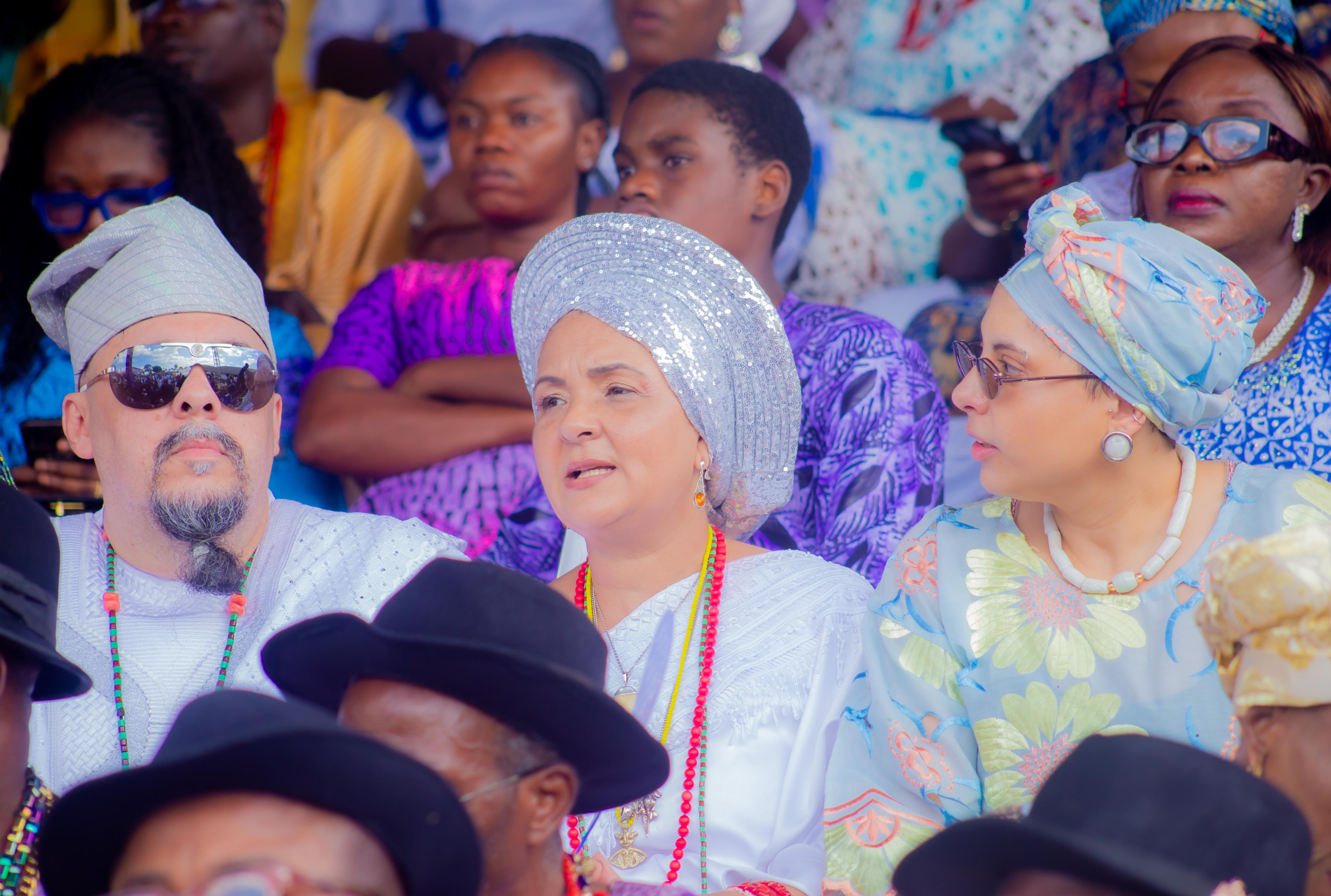

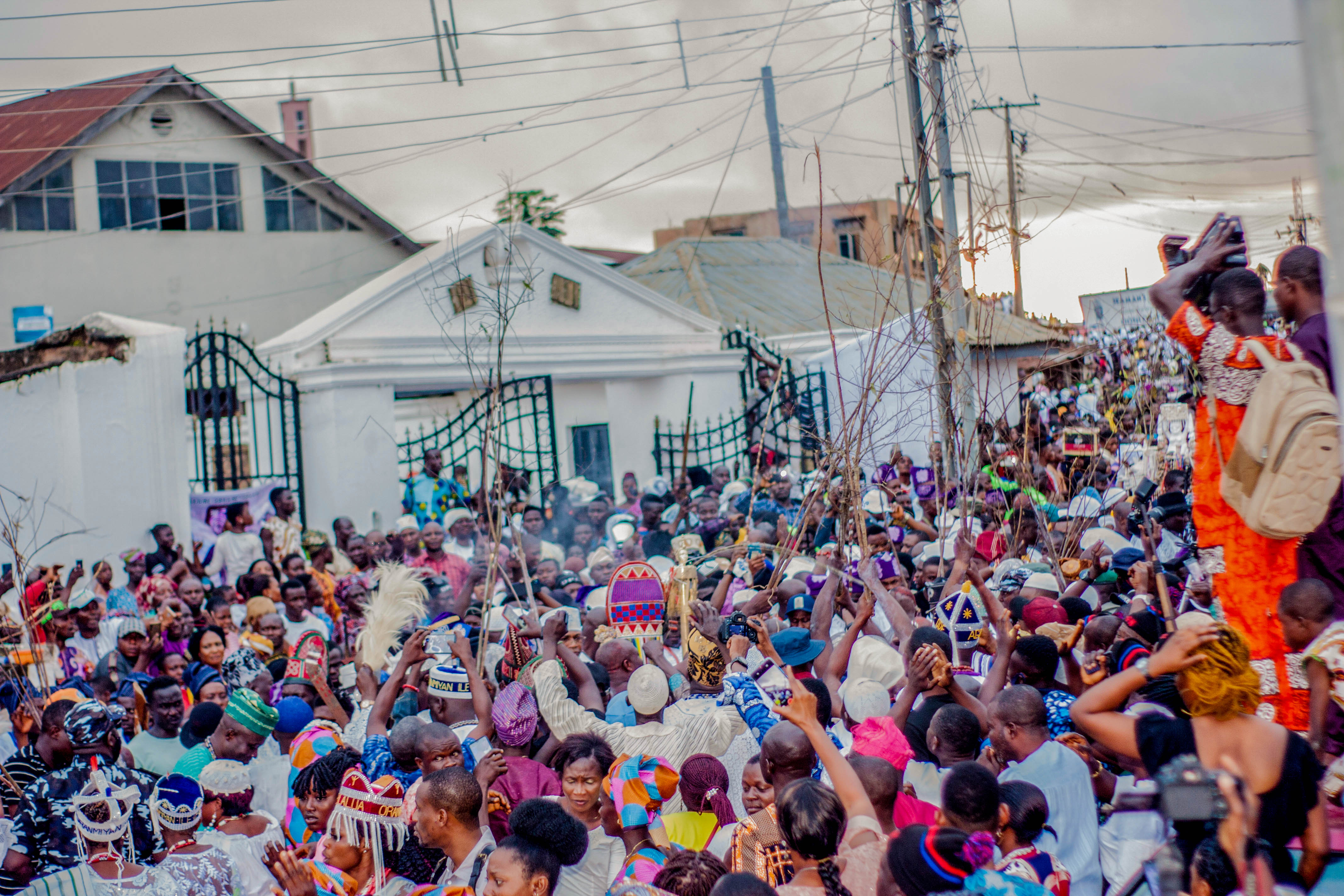

== See also ==
- Ogun Festival
- Ugie Oduduwa
- List of festivals in Nigeria

== Bibliography ==
- Olubunmi, A.O. The Rise and Fall of The Yoruba Race 10,000BC-1960AD, The 199 Publishing Palace ISBN 978-2457-38-8
- On Ijesa Racial Purity, The 199 Publishing Palace ISBN 978-2458-17-1
- Akinjogbin, I. A. (Hg.): The Cradle of a Race: Ife from the Beginning to 1980, Lagos 1992 (The book also has chapters on the present religious situation in the town).
- Bascom, William: The Yoruba of Southwestern Nigeria, New York 1969 (The book mainly deals with Ife).
