= Ahenzae =

Oba of Benin (r. 1641–1661)

- A contemporary commemorative head of an Oba in coronation regalia including a coral pearl crown and high coral pearl neck collar.

20th Oba of the Kingdom of Benin
- Reign: c. 1641 – c. 1661
- Coronation: c. 1641
- Predecessor: Ohuan
- Successor: Akenzae
- Born: c. 1625
- Died: c. 1661
Regnal name
- Ahenzae
- Mother: Eson

Ahenzae, also known as Ohenzae or Ehenzai, was the twentieth Oba ('king') of the Kingdom of Benin. His mother was Eson. Ascending the throne aged 16, his youth led access to him being controlled by senior palace and town chiefs who restricted him to leaving the palace only once a year. His reign was marked by a decline in the wealth of the kingdom, including disruption in the work of the royal bronze-casters' guild and the end in the manufacture of the rectangular palace plaques. It also saw the transfer of wealth from the royal treasury to court officials and chiefs, including the loss of the royal coral beads in a game of dice. In 1651, he was visited by a group of missionary friars from the Order of Friars Minor Capuchin. Their initial meetings were cordial and Ahenzae was willing to consider providing a church and interpreters to the missionaries. However, resistance from his courtiers and an inappropriate approach by two of the friars during the Ugie-Ivie ('festival of beads') in 1652 led to him expelling them. He died in 1661 and was succeeded by Akenzae.

== Accession ==
The eleventh Oba or 'king' of the Kingdom of Benin, Ohuan died in 1641 without an heir. (Note: 1641 is the consensus amongst writers although Anthropologist Percy Amaury Talbot gives a different succession chronology. He places Ahenzae's accession around 1630.) This started a chain of events that led to disruption in the kingdom over the next six reigns. The right to inherit the throne, once confined to an Oba's direct descendants and later broadened to include his brothers, had empowered senior palace and town chiefs involved in selecting rulers greater scope to form alliances and influence succession. The principal officeholders in the court were the Uwangue or Umangue, who headed Iwebo, the foremost palace society, (Note: The Oba's household was organised into three distinct associations, each responsible for particular aspects of palace life. The first, Iwebo, originally managed clothing and regalia for the Oba. Over time, its duties expanded to include oversight of financial and trading matters, under the authority of the Uwangue, a title linked to Ewedo. The second group, Iweguae, consisted of attendants and domestic servants, led by the Esere. The third, Ibiwe, was tasked with serving the Oba's wives and children, and its senior chief, Osodin, is traditionally traced back to Ewedo's time.) and the Iyase. (Note: The Iyase was usually the commander-in-chief of the Benin warriors, followed by the Ezomo and the Ologbosere and Imaran.) The succession passed to a descendent of Oba Orhogbua, and a relative of Ohuan named Ahenzae. Also known as Ehenzai and Ohenzae, he was 16 at the start of his reign. As was customary, in 1643, Eson, Ahenzae's mother, was invested as Iyoba ('queen mother') and was provided with a residence at Eguae-Iyoba ('queen mother's palace') in Lower Uselu.

== Reign ==
Because Ahenzae came to the throne at a young age, he was greatly influenced by the experienced court officials. He was persuaded to appear outside the palace only once each year and spend his time in the royal compound entertained by musicians and over five hundred concubines. This control led to an overall decline in the wealth of the monarchy and hereditary collections of bronze and ivory treasures passed from the royal treasury into the hands of courtiers. The royal coral beads, in particular, were said to have passed from the Oba to a priest named Osuan through repeated games of dice. Ahenzae's predecessor, Ewuare, had appointed Osuan alongside another priest Osa as connected with the royal divinities Uwen and Ora. They played the role of ritually supporting the Oba's hands during coronation rites, visits to shrines, the Ague fast and the Ododua masquerade.

The early part of Ahenzae's reign saw disruption in the work of the royal bronze-casters' guild. The manufacture of the rectangular palace plaques also ceased at this time. Tradition attributes the establishment of the court title Esenua to Ahenzae.

Amongst the stories told of Ahenzae is that of the two brothers from the royal house of Agbor that travelled separately to Benin with large followings to each assert a claim to the Agbor throne. Ahenzae was asked to determine which prince held the stronger claim, using Benin's authority as the source for Agbor's first Oba. After consulting his council, Ahenzae recognised one claimant as the lawful heir, installing him as Obi Eze, and provided an escort for his return to Agbor. To prevent war between the brothers, he followed the advice of his chiefs and required the unsuccessful claimant to remain in Benin. Chief Ihama of Idumwihogbe was assigned responsibility for the prince, who stayed with him for several years. When the prince died without children, Ahenzae directed that Ihama should receive his possessions and enslaved dependants, which increased Ihama's wealth and social standing.

== Missionary activity ==
=== Background ===
Changes in Benin's overseas commerce altered the conditions under which court artists worked. Portugal lost its exclusive position in European trade with the kingdom, which increasingly dealt with merchants from other countries including the Netherlands and United Kingdom. Meanwhile, missionary activity from Portugal continued to develop. Created in 1622, the Sacra Congregazione de Propaganda Fide organised Capuchin work with the objective to send missionaries to Benin. Father Angelo de Valencia was appointed prefect and directed to recruit a team. Initially, twelve Capuchin friars from Spain were selected but three died from plague before they could depart. On 2 February 1651, the remaining missionaries left Cádiz, sailing along the coast between Cape Palmas and Takoradi and arrived at the Benin River two months later. They were briefly delayed at the Dutch encampment at Shama, where de Valencia and another friar were detained. De Valencia delegated authority to Father José de Xijona.

Arriving at Benin, the majority of the friars remained at Ughoton. de Xijon approached the Oba's palace and, with another friar, met an official to whom he handed the letter from the Sacra Congregazione that he had carried from Portugal. He was told that Ahenzae read the letter but that he did not want to meet the missionaries. After about a month in the city without obtaining an audience, and feeling that the official had deceived him, the friar returned to Ughoton to converse with his colleagues. Sickness struck the group, killing de Xijona and two other friars in three days. Leaving the remaining missionaries to recover, de Angelo and two friars travelled to the capital, arriving on 10 August 1651.

=== Meetings with the friars ===
After de Angelo had completed the necessary ceremonial procedures, Ahenzae received the Spanish missionaries courteously and showed interest in their explanation of the mission. It transpired that he had not read the letter as had not been translated nor had he heard it read to him and so he returned it to de Angelo. A Portuguese resident with sufficient knowledge of Edo was then found, who interpreted the text. Ahenzae invited the missionaries to stay and, although he proposed housing the Capuchins inside the palace to enable them to have further discussions, this was not possible. Two months later, at a second meeting, the missionaries handed over their gifts and the Oba offered them an interpreter and a site for a church. However, influential chief ministers stopped these offers materialising and refused to arrange another audience. De Angelo sent Ahenzae a weight-driven alarm clock through a different court official. After the device stopped and de Angelo proposed demonstrating its mechanism directly to the Oba, the chief recognised this as an attempt to obtain an audience and returned the clock.

The missionaries then attempted to preach to the population, but this was inhibited by their lack of knowledge of the local language, made worse by restrictions imposed by the authorities prohibiting locals supporting them in their work on a dictionary. In May 1652, they saw the opportunity to meet Ahenzae without his officials at the Ugie-Ivie ('festival of beads') which involved sacrifices connected with the Oba's coral regalia. Angelo de Valencia and Father Felipe de Hijar joined the crowds moving towards the palace until they reached the principle gate. De Hijar later estimated that more than two thousand senior men, dressed in the regalia, entered the compound. They managed to get before Ahenzae, denouncing the sacrifices and the Benin religious system. Immediately, they were removed by palace servants and forced to return to their lodgings accompanied by jeers from the crowd. That evening, ten messengers from the palace instructed the Capuchins to leave Benin immediately because they had disrupted the ceremony. De Valencia and de Hijar were imprisoned and then expelled from the kingdom.

== Death and succession ==
Ahenzae ruled for twenty years and was succeeded by Akenzae, who was aged sixty at his accession. He is also known as Akengbayi and may have been Ahenzae's brother or son. His death was the beginning of a series of crisis that meant that the kingship passed through separate branches of the Benin dynasty over successive reigns.

== Analysis ==
The historian Allan Frederick Ryder uses Ahenzae's reign as a model for the reduced practical authority exercised by the rulers of Benin during the seventeenth-century. He argued that the sacred institution of the Oba remained essential to Benin's political order even when the reigning monarch exercised little direct control over policy at court. The period saw a series of short reigns, uprisings and disruptions in the kingdom. He describes Ahenzae as a weak monarch whose youth allowed senior courtiers to use royal government for their own purposes. Ceremonial confinement increased this dependence by restricting the information available to him and enabling ministers to control contact between the palace, foreign visitors and the wider kingdom. Anthonia Yakubu specifically mentions Uwangue as the influential courtier that enriched himself by restricted access to the Oba.

The Capuchin narratives distinguish Ahenzae's conduct towards the missionaries from the opposition of his senior officials. During the formal audiences, he was described as courteous, responsive to the translated letter and willing to consider providing a church and interpreters. Court ministers prevented these proposals from being implemented and blocked later attempts to reach him. Father Gavonzi, in his report on the mission, wrote to the pope in frustration, portraying Benin and its population as hostile to Christian preaching. Contemporary sources align this with a tradition from Giovanni Antonio Cavazzi, who referred to a prophecy that a European would kill an Oba, which consequently led to restrictions on European access to the king. This oracle is interpreted as being fulfilled in 1897 with the deposition of Ovonramwen.

== Explanatory notes ==
Ahenzae Oba of the Kingdom of Benin
Regnal titles
Preceded by Ohuan	Oba of the Kingdom of Benin c. 1641 – c. 1661	Succeeded by Akenzae
