= Ofala Festival =

Festival for the renewal of the reign of Igbo kings

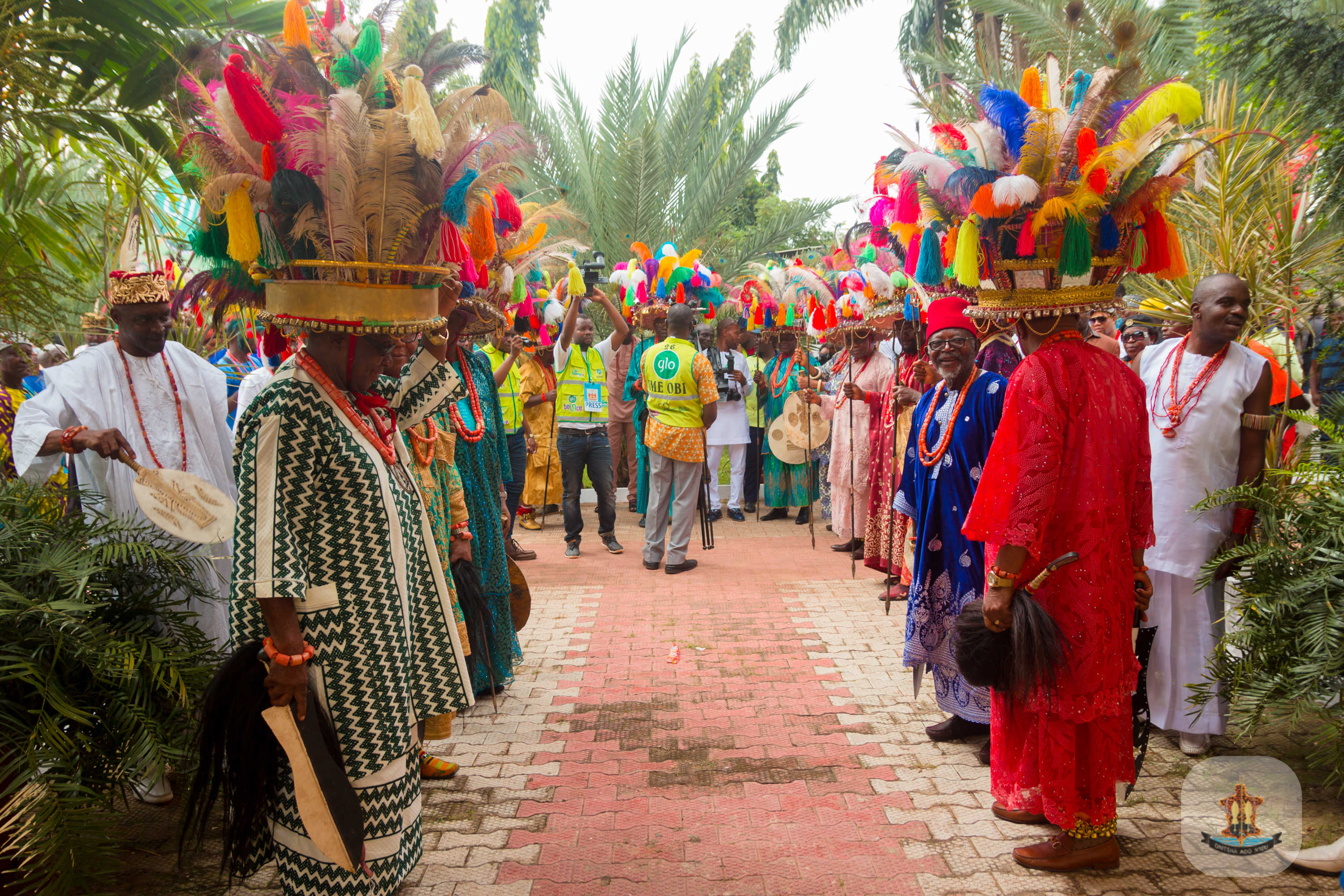
- Status: Active
- Genre: Festival
- Begins: 16th century
- Frequency: Annually every October
- Location: Anambara State
- Country: Nigeria
- Organiser: Igbo people

The Ofala Festival is an annual ceremony practiced by Igbo people, particularly the indigenes of Onitsha, Umueri, Umuoji and other neighboring communities such as Aguleri, Nnewi and Ukpo in Dunukofia Local Government Area. It serves as a rites of renewal of the king or (Igwe/Obi) and is similar to the Igue festival in Benin and the Ine, Osi or Ogbanigbe Festival in many mid-West Igbo communities of Nigeria. The term ofala, is derived from two Igbo words - ọfọ (English: authority) and ala (English: land). The festival is celebrated within two days mostly in October by the Obi (English: king) and is a customary obligation that must be performed every couple of years without fail.

== History ==
According to some oral history sources, the Ofala Festival can be traced back to the 16th Century when Onitsha people emigrated from Benin to the eastern banks of the River Niger presently known as the city of Onitsha and brought with them among other customs, the tradition of monarchy. The festival is akin to the Igue Festival celebrated annually by the Oba of Benin. Some historians also believe the festival is related to the New Yam Festival in Onitsha and the devotion of the king to the safety of his people.

The festival marks the end of a period of retreat sometimes called Inye Ukwu na Nlo when the Obi remains incommunicado and undergoes spiritual purification for the good of the community. At the end of the week-long retreat, the Igwe emerges during the Ofala to bless his subjects and say prayers for the community. Ofala is celebrated annually in some places beginning from the coronation of the Obi to his death, the latter of which is called "the last Ofala" while other towns may require it to be celebrated every two to three years.

== Ofala Onitsha ==
Ofala Onitsha is the indigenous Ofala Festival held by indigenes of Onitsha, Nigeria. It is usually held in October and is the highpoint of the Onitsha ceremonial cycle. Although Ofala Festival is common to many Igbo tribes, Onitsha Ofala is rather unique since it is believed to be the first Ofala in the Igbo tribe.

== Ceremony and purpose ==
The festival usually starts with a traditional twenty-one gun salute followed by an all night Ufie (royal gong) drumming, dancing and other cultural activities. In the afternoon, the Obi's cabinet of chiefs, guests from other communities, age groups, women and youth of the community usually throng the palace grounds or Ime Obi dressed in traditional or ceremonial attires befitting the festival occasion. The royal music or Egwu Ota is played during the entrance of the Ndichie or red cap chiefs who arrive after the gathering of the crowd and bringing along a few of their friends and family members their procession to the palace. The highlight of the festival is the emergence of the Obi in his royal regalia to the cheer of the crowd, a cannon shot announces the entrance of the Obi who is usually dressed in ceremonial robe and carries a bronze sword on his hand, he walks to the sides of the arena or a third of the arena acknowledging the cheers of the gathering. The Obi then retires and subsequently, the red cap chiefs pays homage to him according to seniority, thereafter both the Obi and the chiefs reappear after the firing of another cannon shot. During the second appearance the Obi dances in the arena, something that is rarely seen and his steps cover more distance than the first appearance. Then the visiting chiefs and guests pay homage to the Obi. The festival is also sometimes an occasion for the Obi to honour individuals with chieftaincy titles.

== Arts ==
Music and visual arts have always been a part of the festival. The 2015 edition in Onitsha held a visual arts exhibition called Oreze III, the event had a display by various artists and 20 busts depicting departed Onitsha kings.

== Gallery ==
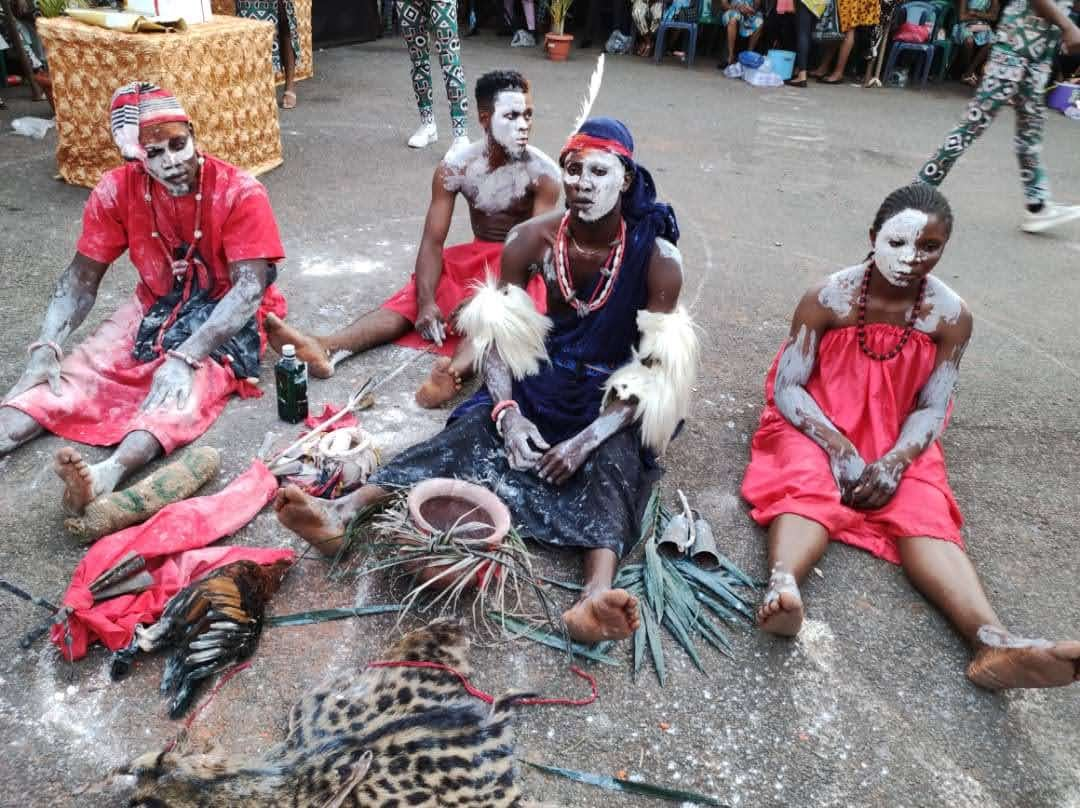
Sacrificing to the gods in the University of Nigeria Anambra state Ofala Festival

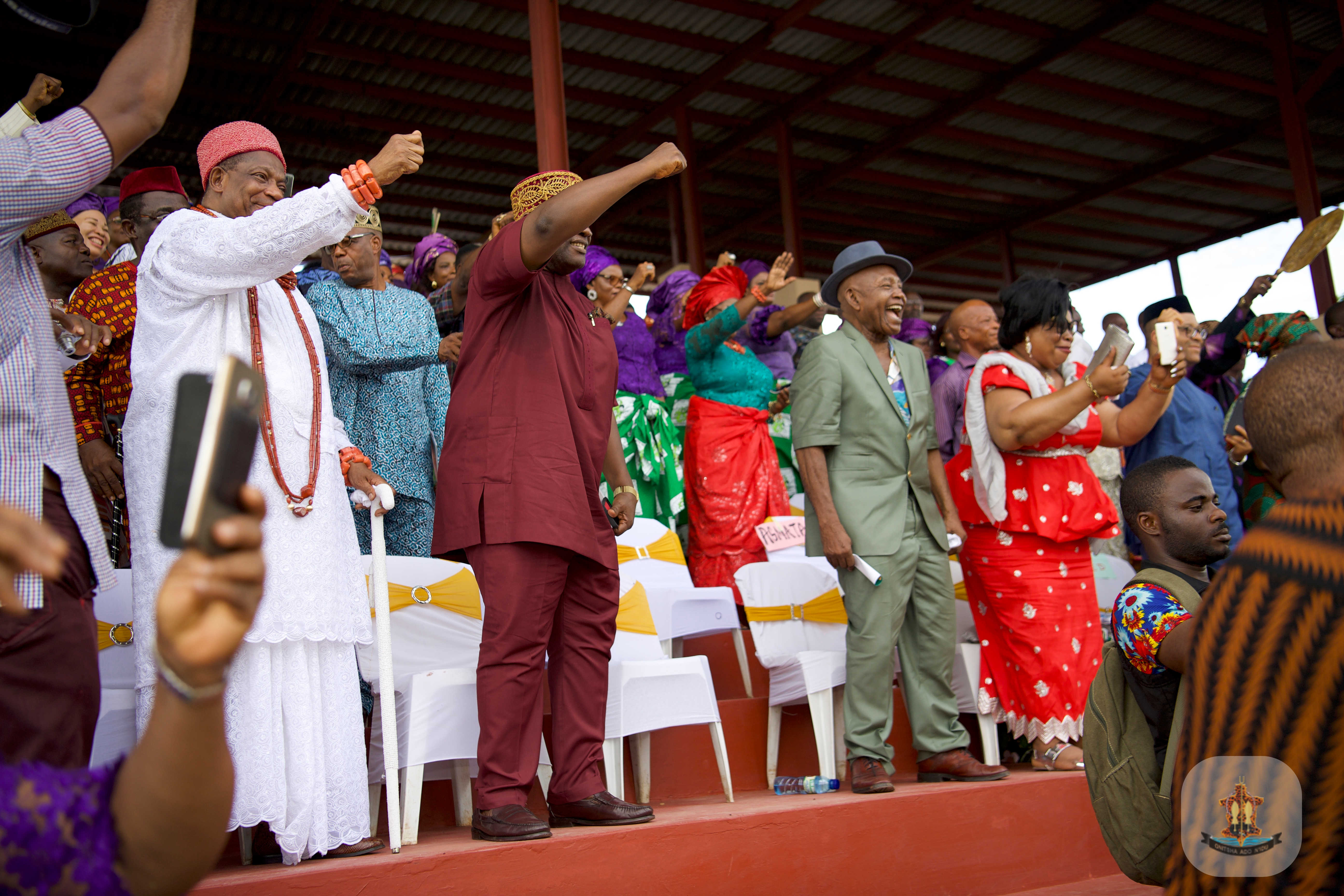
Ofala festival in Onitsha

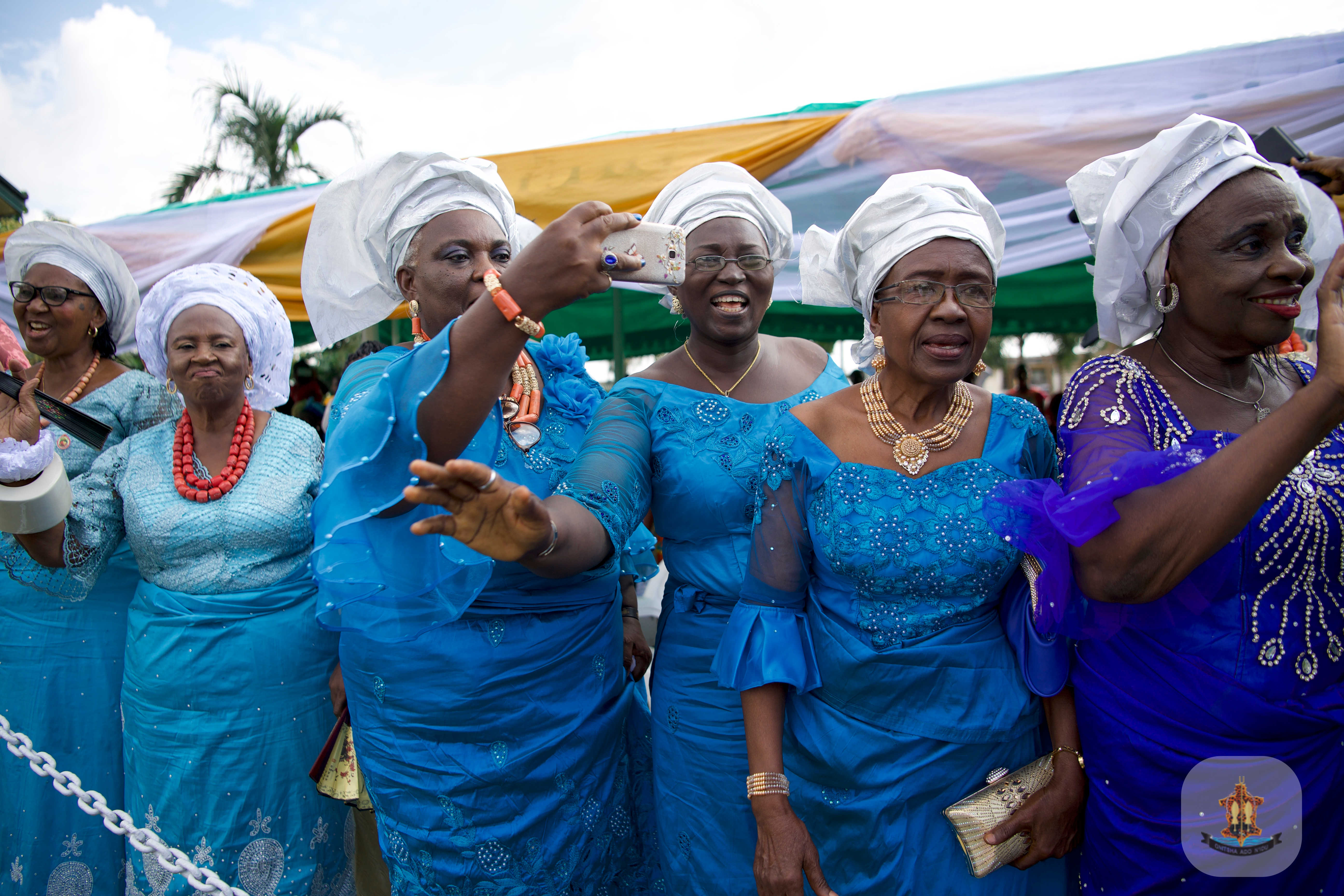
Ofala in Onitsha

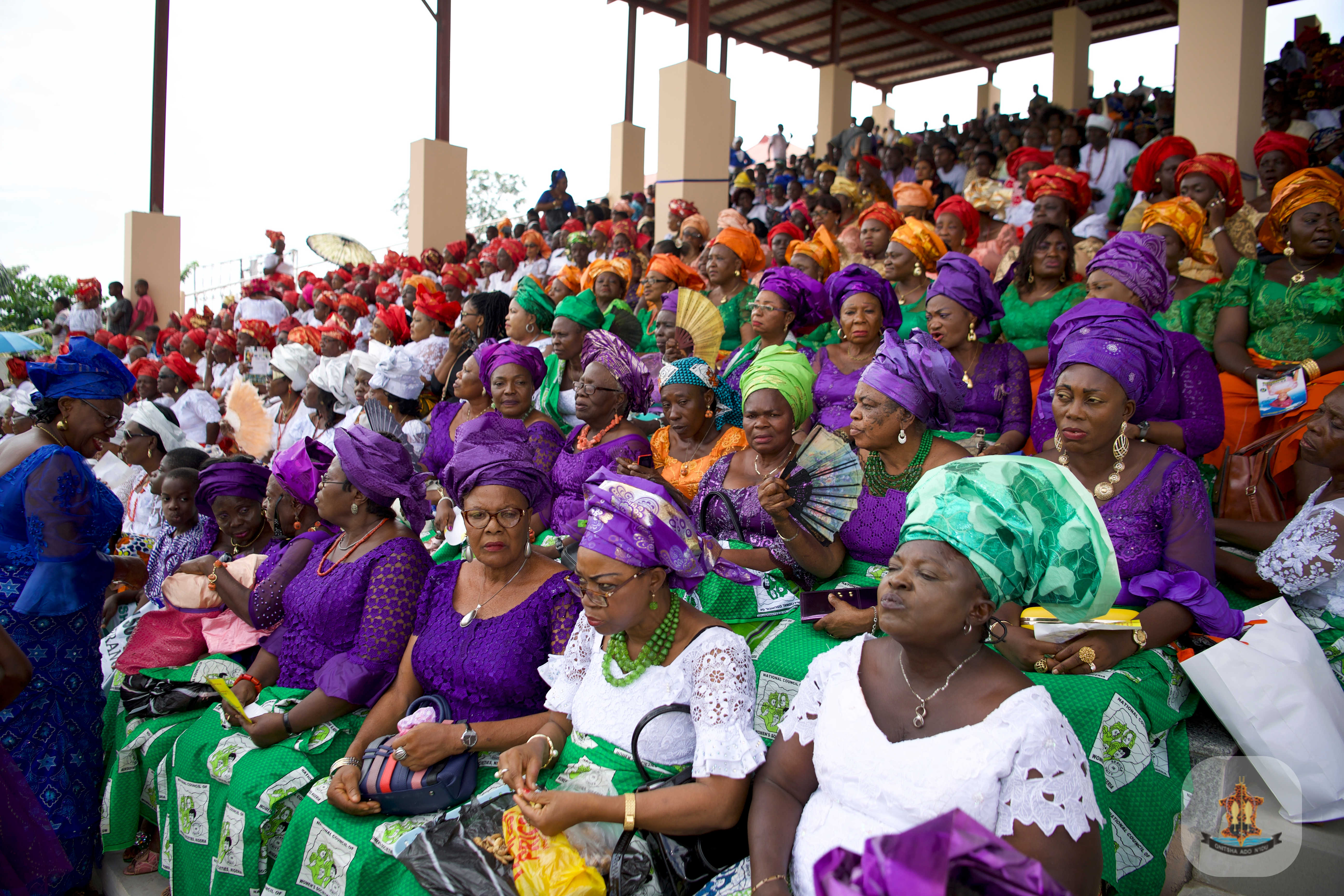
Ofala festival

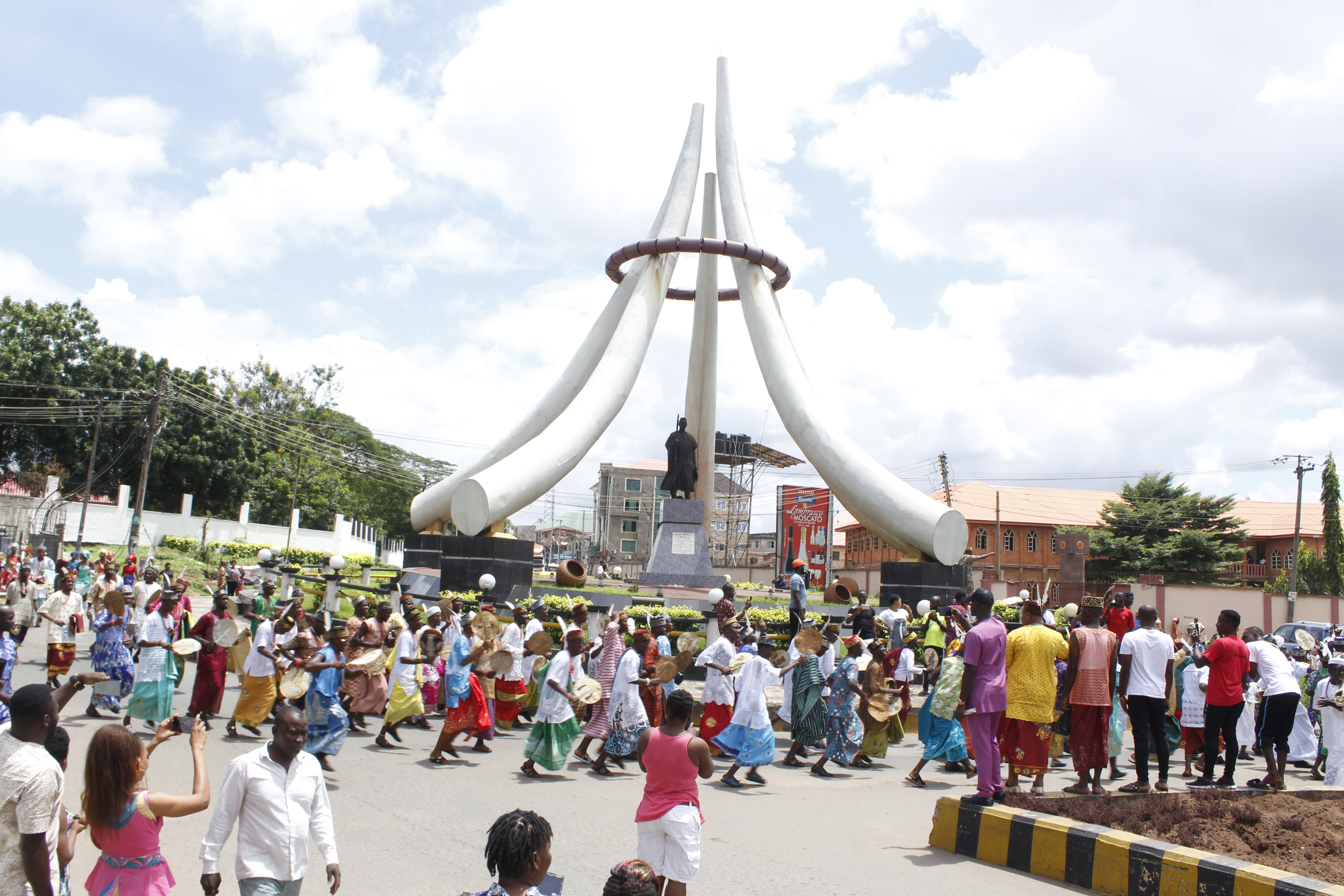
OfalaCarnival 2019
