= Ugie Oduduwa =

Royal ceremony and annual event of the Benin Kingdom

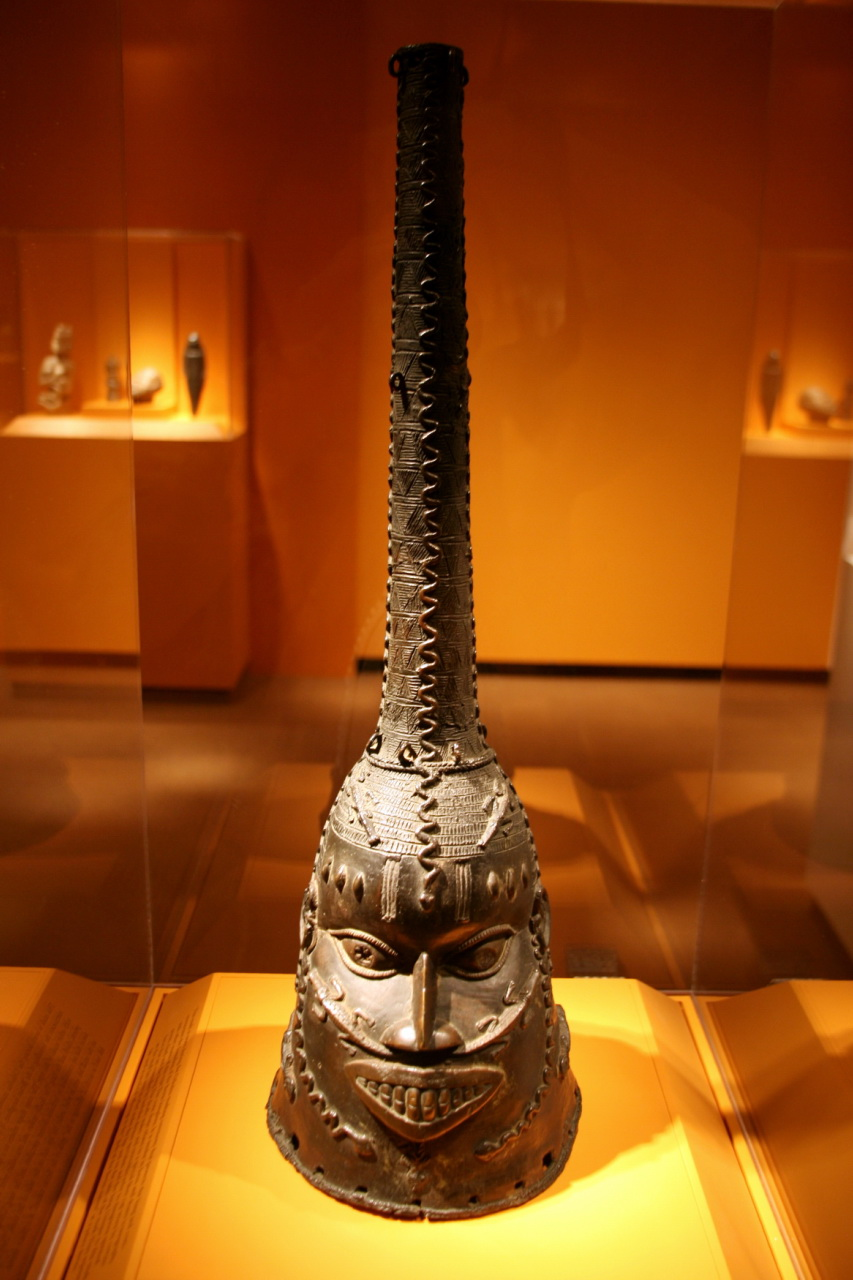
- Helmet mask used during Ugie Ododua with the Oro projection
- Official name: Ugie Oduduwa
- Also called: Aguẹ Osa, Aguẹ Ọghẹnẹ, Ugie Ododua
- Observed by: Royal family of Benin; Edo people
- Type: Cultural, Ritual re-enactment, Historical
- Significance: Veneration of Oduduwa; Founding of the Oba dynasty Well-being of Benin
- Duration: 14 days: 7 days (private); 7 days (public)
- Frequency: Annual
- First time: Mid 18th century
- Started by: Oba Eresoyen
- Related to: Igue

The Ugie Oduduwa lit. Oduduwa Festival, also known as Ugie Ododuwa, and sometimes called the Ague Osa festival, is an annual cultural and ritual event or ceremony. It is centred around a re-enactment ritual acknowledging and celebrating the Oba of Benin's paternal ancestors to preserve their memory and foster social order. Ugie Oduduwa was introduced by Oba Eresoyen in the second quarter of the 1700's, and is dedicated to Oduduwa, father of the Ife prince Oranmiyan and forefather of the Benin royal dynasty. It is closely tied to the older Ague Oghene observance, since both are intrinsically linked to the Benin royal family's origins in Ife.

== History ==
Ugie Oduduwa is a part of a complex of Ugies (events), including: Ugie Ivie (Oba's coral bead festival), Ugie Oro (festival of secret rites, as well as Oba Esigie's victory over the Igala Kingdom of Idah), Ugie Ewere, and culminating with the Igue and its component ceremonies; Ugie Emobo (cleansing ceremony, during which evil spirits 'lingering' after Igue are sent out to the rival kingdoms of Udo and Idah) and Ugie Erha Oba (ceremony honouring the Oba's father and paternal ancestors), which was traditionally held between September and November, followed by the last events — those constituting the Ague, as part of the cycle of annual festivals in Benin observed to purify the kingdom and strengthen its Oba.

In February 1589 when the English explorer and merchant James Welsh and his crew arrived at Benin, Oba Ehengbuda was unable to meet with them the following day because he was having what was described as [sic] "A solemn feast then kept amongst them". The visiting crew were instead received at the palace by the 'veador' or chief man, who may have been the Uwangue. They eventually got an audience with the Oba on March 1, and their trade bargain was completed.

Judging by the date of the English arrival in Benin — On the 25th/26th of February, the "solemn feast" the Oba was secluding for was likely connected to Ague; either Ague Osa (which Ehengbuda has repudiated and scrapped as he was in fact strongly anti-Catholic), or Ague Oghene which was connected with the cult of Oduduwa, in collaboration with the Ooni of Ife. The annual Ague fasting was also the ongoing event in January 1897, the period immediately preceding the Benin ambush/massacre and the subsequent Benin Expedition. According to oral tradition, the oracle of the 'Oghene of Uhe' (Ooni of Ife) foretold in 1890 that a calamity was about to befall on Benin, the king therefore sent to warn Ovonramwen to act consciously.

Formerly a ceremony of profound importance in Benin, the full extent of Ague celebrations ceased during the reign of Oba Eweka II c. 1914—1933.

=== Ugie Oduduwa's early origins ===
The final annual events in the Benin traditional cycle are those of the Ague or Agwe; fasting for the New Yam, during which the first yams to bud are blessed by the Oba in the hope for a bountiful harvest. The fasting was not total, and old yam stocks, other yam varieties and other non-staple crops were eaten, ending with the Ague Oghene (Ooni of Ife's fasting). The Ague rites have origins tied to, and dating back to the very beginnings of the Oba dynasty under Eweka I, while Ague Oghene was instituted in Benin during the reign of Ewuare, c. 1450—1480. The name is a direct reference to the origin of the ruling dynasty's founding fathers, as well as that of the Uwen and Ora deities.

Ague is also closely tied to deities brought from Ife, or deified personages from Ife; Uwen and Ora whose principal seat was in the community of Usen. Both are today considered as Ẹbo ne Ẹdọ (state or palace gods) concerned with the welfare of the nation. The chief Osa is in charge of Ora, while chief Osuan is in charge of Uwen, and also bears the appellation of Doloro lit. 'owner or leader of secrets', as it is believed in Benin that only the Osa and Osuan known the secrets of the Oba and palace. They are regarded as 'the twin chiefs' and always appear together, including during the Oba's coronation and the Ododua masquerade appearances, where they support the Oba's arms, and wear similar conical headgear with oro stems made from woven palm fiber (raffia), much like the Oba's, but not gilded in coral, and less ornamented. They are also the only chiefs who can enter the interior of Oguan (seclusion during Ague) during the final seven days. They are thus, called er'Oba (eree Oba) meaning Oba's equals/friends.

In the sixteenth century, the ceremony was re-constituted as Ague Osa (the supreme God's Ague) by Oba Esigie with the introduction of new ideas tied to Christian Catholic influences from the Portuguese. During Ague, the Oba goes into seclusion to perform certain secret rites, and only after the rituals are completed is the consumption of new yam permitted for the Edo people.

=== Revival and changes by Eresoyen ===
The focus of Ague shifted back under Ehengbuda c. 1586—1616 who was vehemently anti-Christian and so, scrapped Ague Osa, reviving the older Ague Oghene rites. However, under Oba Eresoyen, c. 1737—1750, Benin witnessed a resurgence in Catholic Christianity, and elements of the Ague Osa became partially re-incorporated into the events of the Ague Oghene in his reign.

It was Eresoyen who introduced the Ugie Ododua proper as a purification masking ceremony restricted to the palace court, and making it an integral part of the Ague Oghene. He also banned the Ovia rites in Benin due to his traditional rivalry with Esigie, to whom it was strongly associated. Thence, Ododua supplanted Ovia in urban Benin.

== Details of the festival and masks ==
At the festival, seven masquerades perform. These are attributed in oral tradition to the village of Uzala to the north of Benin, where Eresoyen is said to have gone to war and encountered the fourteen Ovbo n'Uzala masquerades which he admired, and decided to return with seven. He then gave the chiefs Osa and Osuan their songs and dances. Upon closer scrutiny however, the masquerades owe nothing to Uzala. Three of the performers in headpieces capped with long oro projections sitting atop their heads represent 'males'; another three with crested hairstyles represent 'females'; and one, with a very short and stumpy oro featuring a forehead crescent shape represents a male spirit-world child Ovbie Erinmwin. Both the oro projections and female crests are topped with feathers.

During performance, the masquerades hold ufiemwin arrows in one hand, and in the other, the males hold longswords while the females hold hand fans. The 'child' of the group, who seems to be their leader, holds a fan and an avalaka. The actual identities of the masked spirits remain inconclusive, their supervisor, the chief Osa says they all have names which can not be mentioned and that they also had ranks among them. Benin history specialist and anthropologist Paula Girshick Ben-Amos thought they depict the great magicians or medicine specialists Ora and his wife Uwen together with their entourage from Ife in Oranmiyan's incoming group, and later alternatively, that they represent members of the ruling line of Oduduwa, progenitor of the current Yoruba dynasty. She also notes that in 1981, Barbara Blackmun was told that the masks represents kings in the ruling line of Oduduwa. Internal evidence lends more credence to her first theory of the personalities represented. Also, the pairing of male and female aspects of material art, a feature exceedingly rare in Benin but common among the Yoruba is one of the strongest indicators of their Yoruba links.

The performance of the Oduduwa masquerades and its associated ceremonies are the only part of Ague still performed publicly.

=== Iconography ===
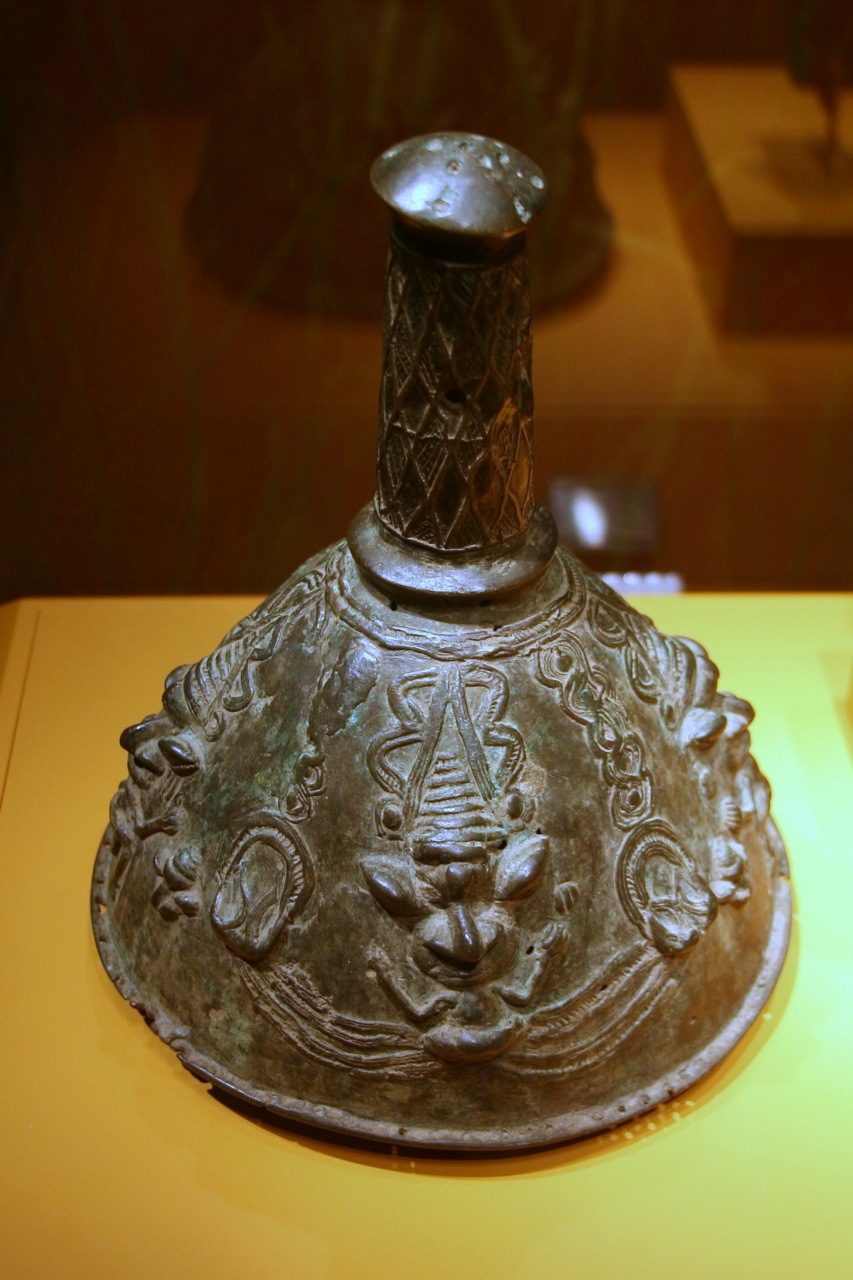
Ritual brass crown (Adé) from Iperu Remo, Ogun State, with an Oro projection of triangular Ijebu design, and mudfish iconography.

All the masks have bared teeth, crocodiles emerge from the nostrils, and snakes zig-zag down the surface of their oro projections. The headgears have Yoruba associations both in their forms; which are similar to that of Yoruba brass crowns, and in their decorative design with triangular patterns called Uzebu, which are derived from the motifs on traditionally made Ijebu cloths. Faces with bared teeth are also a rare occurrence in Edo art forms, but they are a staple of Yoruba ancestral crowns which traditionally feature stylized (and often scary) human faces with strong features, projecting eyes, patrilineal facial markings and sometimes bared teeth, which is often interpreted to represent Oduduwa, founder of centralized kingship.

Yoruba crowns can be conical or mitre-shaped, helmet-shaped or stem-on-cone with long vertical cylinders or stems, and are topped by feathers/birds on long, narrow tubes, with hanging beaded fringes or nets obscuring the face of the Oba, similar to how faces of the Egungun are concealed by netted helmet masks. A Benin metal plaque shows frontal eyes and mouth on a high 'conical hat', and a bronze head sample from Benin dated to the mid 16th or early 17th century is surmounted by four metal birds. A close connection between the stem-on-cone form of Yoruba crowns and the crowns and chiefly headgear in Benin featuring beaded vertical shafts has been drawn. The mudfish, bird, crocodile, stylized face and snake imagery present in the sacred art of both groups, has also been connected by art historians. The stem-on-cone crowns of some Ijebu kings feature crescent shapes on their forehead like that of the 'child' in the masquerade group; this is the Yoruba symbol associated with the 'cult of the earth', and can be seen on the forehead of brass Edan Ogboni statuettes. Historians like Willett and Cordwell conclude with the likelihood that early Yoruba antecedents in the crown-making traditions of Yorubaland interwove with and influenced that of Benin, which was confirmed by the Ile-Ife corpus.

== Modern changes ==
The various Ugies (festivals) observed in the Kingdom of Benin used to be spread across different events along the course of the entire year in tandem with the annual agricultural calendar. Many are still observed today, however, since the 1940's, most have been consolidated as the 'modern Igue' and concentrated into a period close to the Christmas holidays, to facilitate broad participation.

== See also ==
- Oduduwa
- Igue festival
- Olojo festival
- Ofala Festival
- New Yam Festivals in Nigeria
- List of festivals in Nigeria
