= Ire Ekiti =

Coordinates: 7.745°N 5.394°E

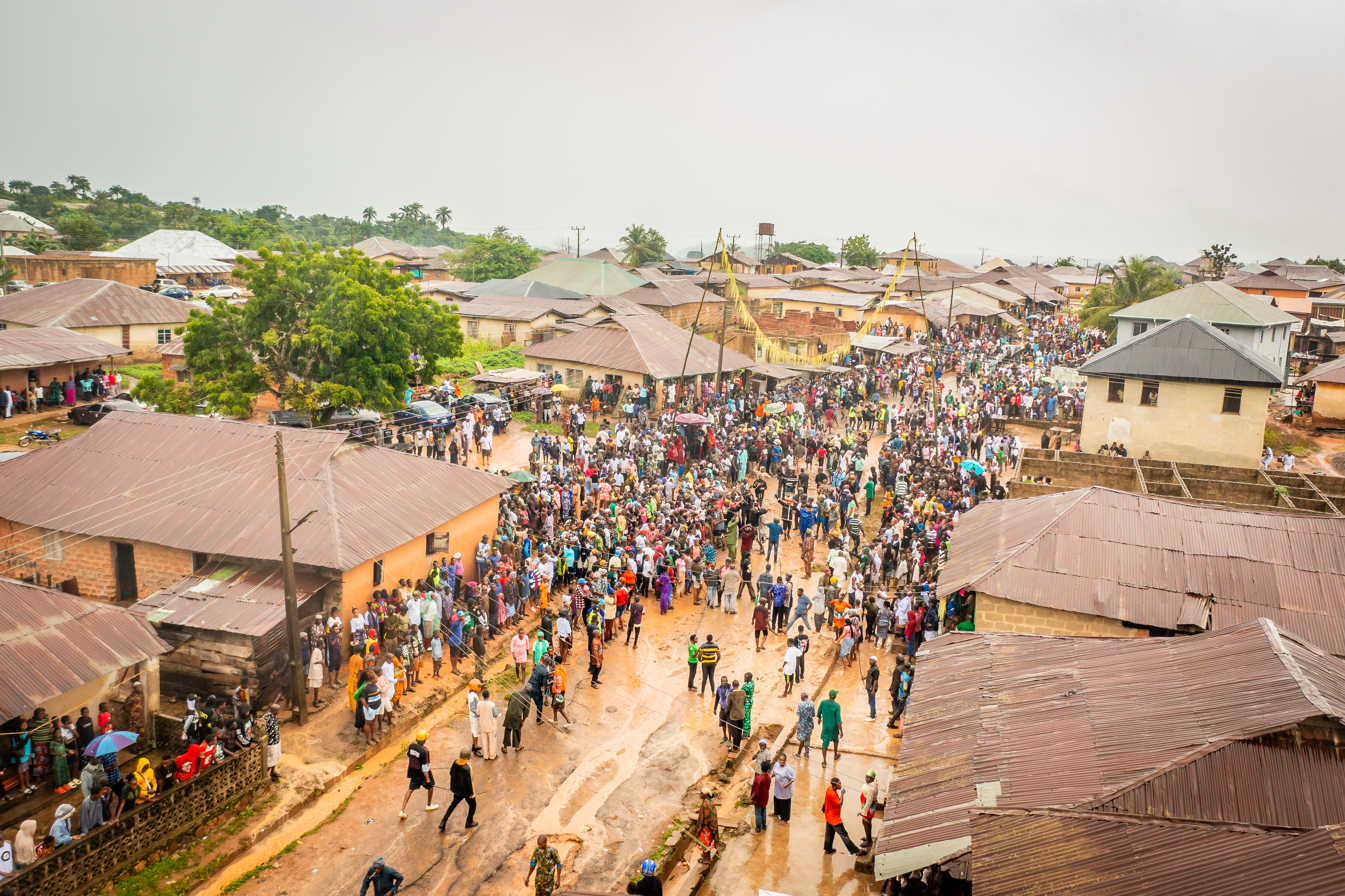
Crowd during Ogun Festival at Ire Ekiti.

Ire Ekiti, situated in Ekiti State, southwest Nigeria, is a town majorly inhabited by the Yoruba people.
