= Igue festival =

Festival in Nigeria by the Binis

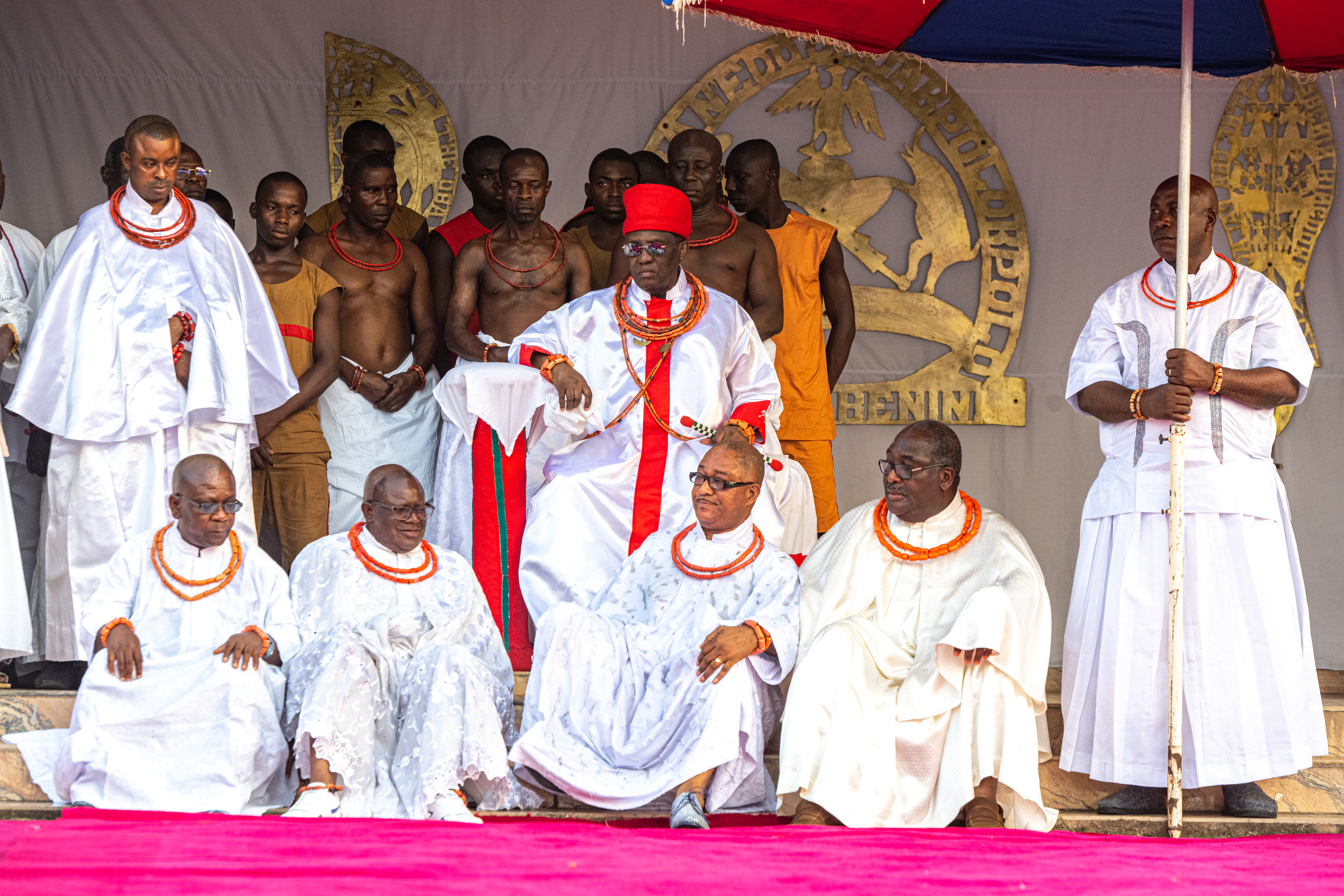
- Igue Festival (Chiefs and the Ọba)
- Nickname: King's Festival
- Status: Active
- Genre: Festivals
- Date: December
- Begins: 1440
- Frequency: Annually
- Location: Edo State
- Country: Nigeria

Igue festival (also known as King's Festival) is a celebration with its origin in the Benin Kingdom of Edo State, southern Nigeria. One tradition states that the festival date coincided with the marriage of Ewuare to a wife named Ewere. Celebrated between Christmas and New Year, the festival includes the Oba's blessing of the land and his people.The Igue festival also honors the memory of former Obas and spans a period of seven days. During the Igue ritual season, the Oba is prohibited from being in the presence of any non-native person.

== History ==
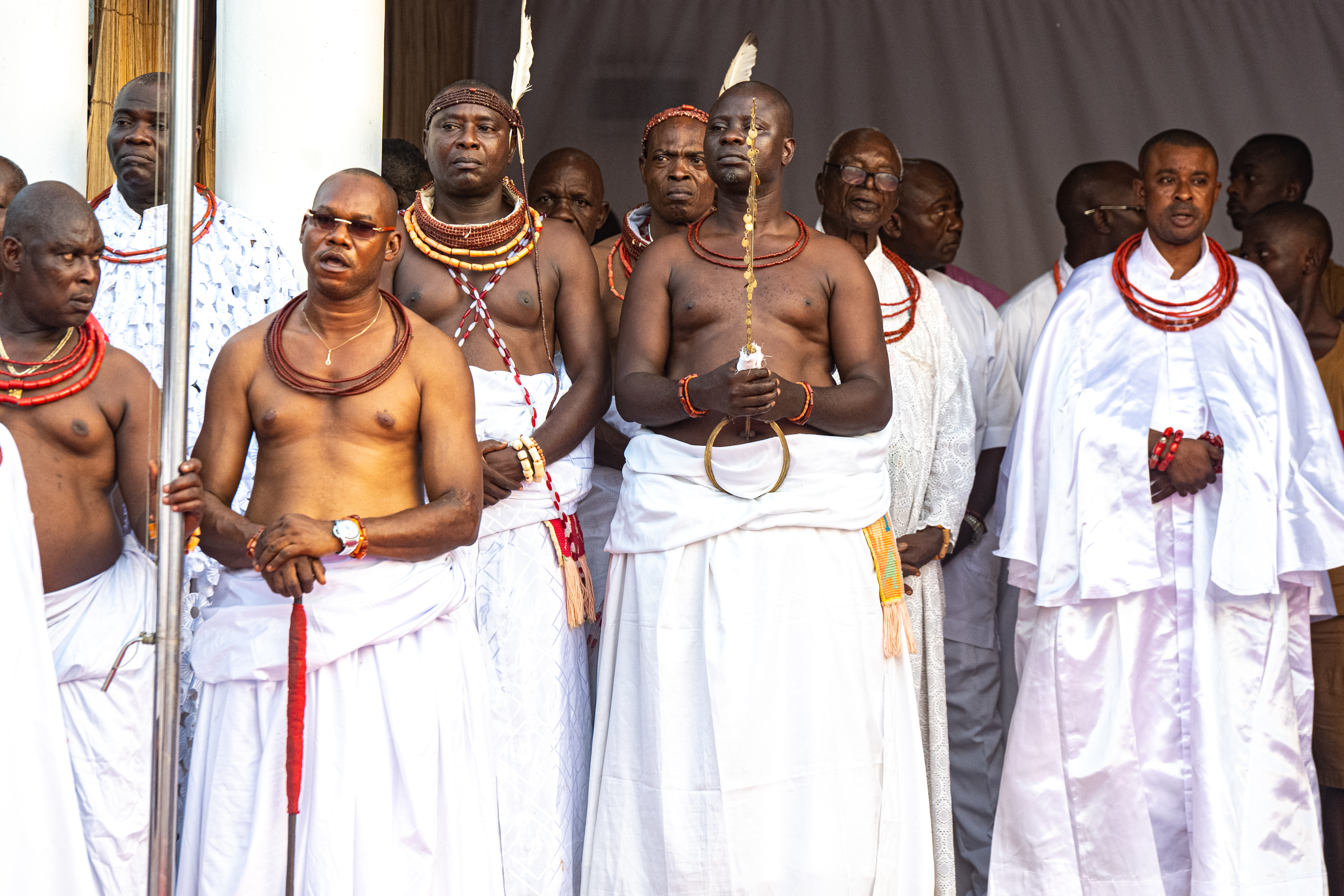
Chiefs during Igue

The Igue Festival was initiated in the 14th century during the reign of Oba Ewuare I, who reigned in Benin between 1440 and 1473. Following Oba Ewuare I's experience whilst fighting as a prince for the Benin throne, he was known as Prince Ogun, the son of Oba Ohen at that time.

The Igue festival, however, now consists of several other festivals put together by Oba Akenzua II. This is because he wanted the festival to last for a couple of days due to the current movement of people and the Igue festival has become a terminal for many other festivals celebrated by the Benin people.

== See also ==
- Ugie Ododuwa
