= Ogun Festival =

Festival in Nigeria by the Yorubas

- Significance: Commemoration of the lifetime of Ogun
- Frequency: Annual

Ogun Festival is an annual festival observed by the Yoruba people of Ondo State, Nigeria in honour of Ogun, a warrior and powerful spirit of metal work believed by the Yoruba to be the first god to arrive on earth.

== History ==
According to Yoruba mythology, Ogun was a King and the father of Oranmiyan, and the first person to arrive on earth; he used a cutlass and a dog to clear the road for the arrival of other deities. He is also said to have given the finishing touches to the first set of humans created by Obatala, the Yoruba god of creation. His festival is usually held around August or September in Ondo State and parts of Ekiti state.

== Preparation ==
Preparation for the festival begin seventeen days in advance. The chief priest announces the sighting of the new moon (which must be sighted before beginning the festival) by blowing the upe (local trumpet) for seven days. Nine days after the sighting of the new moon, the king sends an emissary to officially announce the ceremony. Preparations for the festival include the repairing of bridges and clearing of footpaths. The festival continues with a vigil called Ilagun, Asoro or aisun ogun which takes place three days before the Ogun day. The blacksmiths of the city of Ife donate new cutlasses, hoes and bell gongs, and the shrine is beautified with palm fronds, cowries and other items. Libation is then poured, a ritual dance is conducted around the shrine, and prayers are offered. Dogs are prepared for sacrifice.

== Festivity ==
The festival reaches a frenzy during the last three days. The dog which is the main centre of the festival is slaughtered on the first of these days. Two people moving in opposite directions pull the dog towards themselves hence forcing it to a slow and painful death. Sometimes the High priest kills the dog by striking it with a machete before it actually dies. The blood of the dog is then mixed with salt, kolanuts, palm wine and palm oil, and poured over the working tools of the worshipers which are gathered in a bowl; this is believed to protect them from trouble and bring about abundant profits. Ogun is the patron of those who make use of metals in their everyday work, such as blacksmith, drivers, mechanics and surgeons. The festival can also be held anywhere as the high priest sometimes celebrates the festival at Abuja without not following the usual seventeen-day order.
