= Candomblé Jeje =

Branch of Candomblé

Candomblé Jeje, also known as Brazilian Vodum, is one of the major branches (branches) of Candomblé. It has roots in the beliefs of the Adja, Fon and Ewe peoples from what H.B. Capo called the "Gbe speaking area", which today is around southeastern Ghana, southern Togo, southern Benin, and the southwestern fringe of Nigeria. Historically this area was known as the Slave Coast of West Africa.

== Voduns ==
Jeje spirits are called Voduns (sing. Vodum). According to tradition, they were introduced into the Kingdom of Dahomey from nearby lands by its founder King Adja-Tado, on the advice of a bokono (seer). Their cult was reorganized and uniformized by King Agajah in the 18th century.

Jeje Voduns are sometimes worshiped in houses of other nations by different names. For instance, the Vodum Dan or Bessen is called Oxumarê in Candomblé Ketu. Conversely, the Ketu Orixás may be worshiped in Jeje houses, but retain their names.

Voduns are organized into families:

Dan	Yewá	Fá
Togun	Tohossou	Nohê Aikunguman
Tobossi	Sakpata	Wealth Voduns
Hevioso	Aveji-Dá	Nanã
Marine Naés	Freshwater Naés	Eku and Awun
Mawu-Lisa	Hohos	-

== See also ==
- Candomblé
- Tambor de Mina
