= List of Nigerian women artists =

This is a list of women artists who were born in the Nigeria or whose artworks are closely associated with that country.

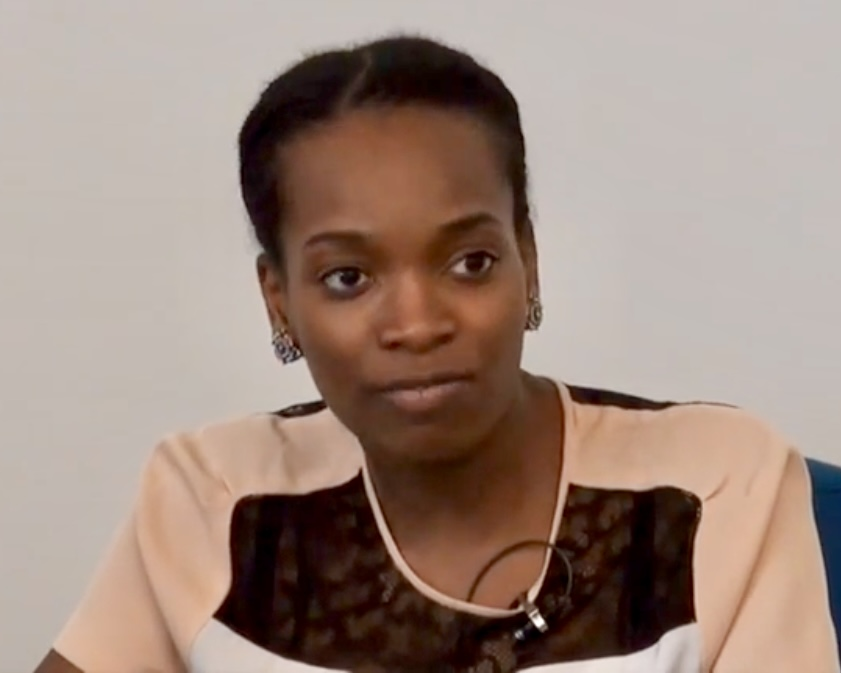
Njideka Akunyili Crosby, 2014

Nike Davies-Okundaye, 2023

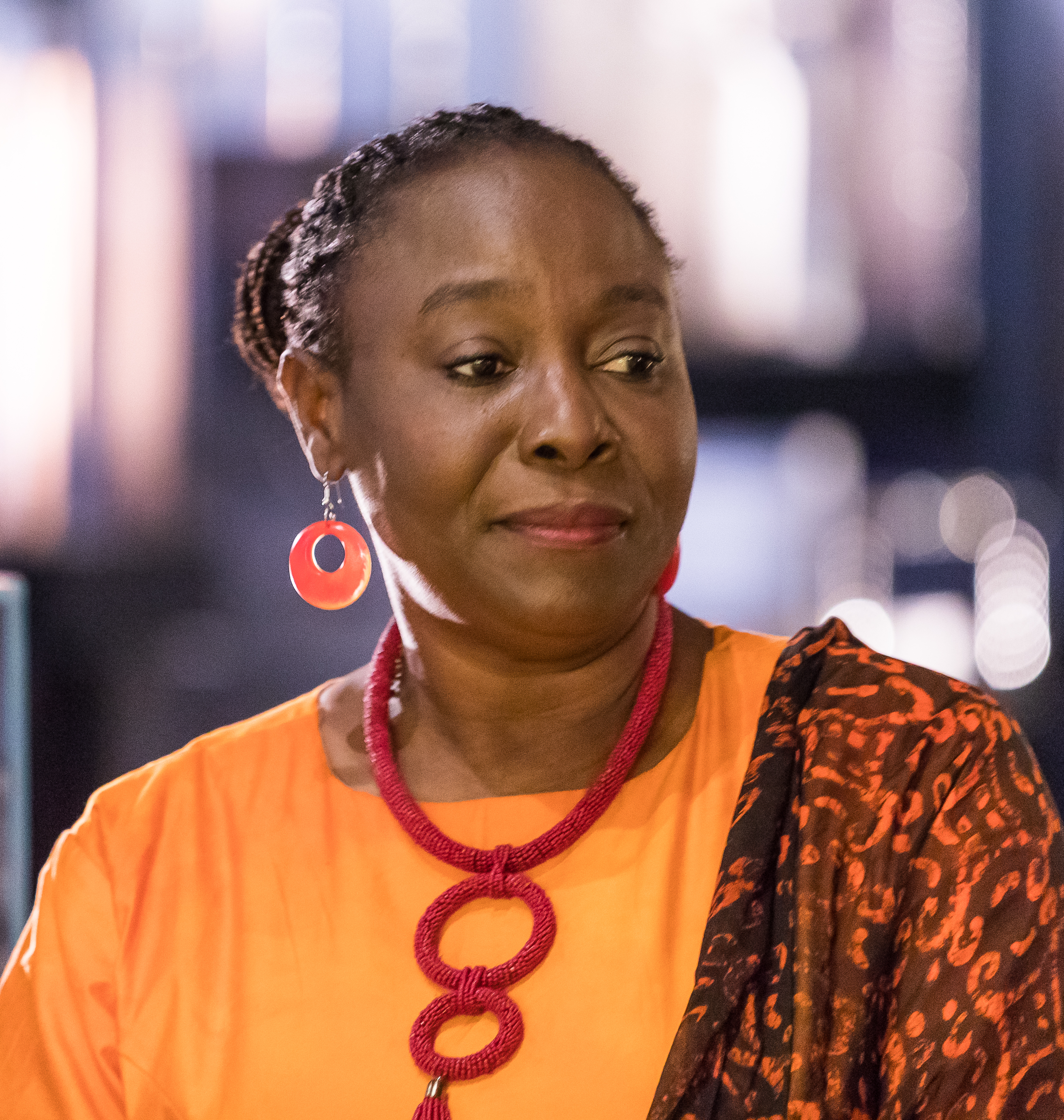
Peju Layiwola, 2022

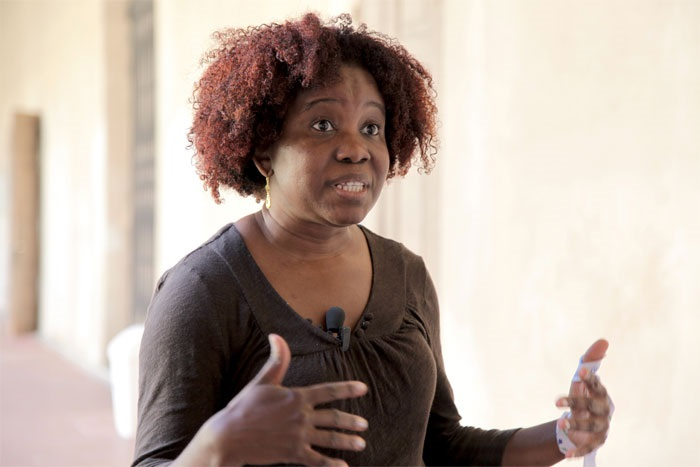
Fatimah Tuggar, 2010

== A ==
- Haneefah Adam, visual artist
- Jenevieve Aken (born 1989), photographer focused on self-portraits, portrait, and documentary photos
- Minne Atairu, artist who generates synthetic Benin Bronzes using software
- Peju Alatise (born 1975), artist, poet, writer
- Ruby Onyinyechi Amanze (born 1982), Nigerian-born British-American drawings and works on paper, she lives in Brooklyn, New York

== B ==
- Olawunmi Banjo (born 1985), painter, drawing

== C ==
- Sokari Douglas Camp (born 1958), Nigerian-born English sculptor
- Chinwe Chukwuogo-Roy (1952–2012), Nigerian-born English figurative painter
- Njideka Akunyili Crosby (born 1983), Nigerian-born visual artist, lives in Los Angeles

== D ==
- Nike Davies-Okundaye (born 1951), batik and adire textile designer
- Ndidi Dike (born 1960), English-born Nigerian sculpture and mixed-media painter

== E ==
- Afi Ekong (1930–2009), painter, fashion designer and member of the royal family of Edidem Bassey Eyo Epharaim Adam III
- Dami Elebe (fl. 2000s), screenwriter and television personality
- Oroma Elewa, visual and performance artist, writer and creative director
- Ndidi Emefiele (born 1987), painter
- Ekene Emeka Maduka (born 1996), Canadian-Nigerian contemporary artist known for her self portraits

== F ==
- Modupeola Fadugba (born 1985), painter
- Stella Faikyesi (born c. 1971), cinematographer, painter, and art photographer

== G ==
- Kaltume Bulama Gana (born 1964), visual artist and appointed CEO of the National Troupe of Nigeria in 2024
- Bikiya Graham-Douglas (f. 2004), producer, actress, and theatre professional

== I ==
- Ruth Ige (born 1992), painter based in New Zealand, paints primarily in blue

== K ==
- Ayobola Kekere-Ekun (born 1993), contemporary visual artist
- Marcia Kure (born 1970), mixed media painter and drawer
- Ladi Kwali ( c.1925–1984), potter

== L ==
- Joy Labinjo (born c. 1994), visual mixed-media artist and painter
- Peju Layiwola (born 1967), visual artist, art historian, and professor

== N ==
- Otobong Nkanga (born c. 1974), performance and tapestry artist who utilizes earth sciences in her work

== O ==
- Toyin Ojih Odutola (born 1985), Nigerian-born American known for her multimedia drawings and works on paper
- Temitayo Ogunbiyi (born 1984), contemporary artist and curator
- Suzanna Ogunjami, painter, printmaker, jewelry designer; first African woman to have a solo exhibit in a commercial gallery in the United States
- Amarachi Okafor (born 1977), sculptor, mixed media artist
- Nnenna Okore (born 1975), Australian-born American textile artist and sculptor, of Nigerian descent
- Ebele Okoye (born 1969), Nigerian-born German painter, animator
- Adéọlá Ọlágúnjú, photographer, video artist, sound and installation artist
- Princess Elizabeth Olowu (born 1939), sculptor, daughter of Oba Akenzua II
- Colette Omogbai (born 1943), painter and educator

Patience Torlowei

== T ==
- Patience Torlowei (born 1964), fashion designer
- Fatimah Tuggar (born 1967), interdisciplinary artist

== U ==
- Etso Ugbodaga-Ngu (1921–1996), painter, the first Nigerian and first woman professor at Ahmadu Bello University

== W ==
- Susanne Wenger (1915–2009), Austrian-born Nigerian sculptor

== See also ==
- List of Nigerians
- List of Nigerian artists
- List of women artists
