= Oba Akenzua Royal Stools =

Royal stools of the Kingdom of Benin returned to Nigeria

The Oba Akenzua Royal Stools are two royal stools associated with the Kingdom of Benin, in present-day Edo State, Nigeria. One stool is made of brass and the other of wood, and they were made during the reign of Oba Eresoyen and Oba Esigie.

They were removed from the Benin royal palace during the Benin Expedition of 1897 and later entered the collection of the Ethnological Museum in Berlin, Germany. Their return became the subject of repeated requests by successive Obas of Benin, beginning with Eweka II in 1914 and continuing with Akenzua II from the 1930s. The original stools were transferred from Germany to Nigeria in 2022 and formally handed over to Ewuare II, Oba of Benin, at the Royal Palace in Benin City in May 2024.

== Description ==
The two royal stools are cylindrical and similar in size and construction. Each consists of a circular seat supported by a cylindrical structure. They are known in Benin as Ekete, and also known as Erhe and form part of the ceremonial objects associated with the Benin monarchy. Royal stools had functions beyond their use as seats and were incorporated into ceremonies connected with the institution of the Oba.

The Art Institute of Chicago refers to the stool as Oba Eresoyen's Stool and records that it was held in the collection of the Ethnologisches Museum in Berlin.

Art historians Barbara W. Blackmun and Paula Girshick Ben-Amos associated the brass stool with Oba Eresoyen and the wooden stool with Oba Esigie, who ruled in the early sixteenth century. The brass stool contains several decorative elements, including a cross-shaped design, a representation of the sun, an ancestral staff, a crescent moon, a simian face, cowrie shells, a frog, a snake, an elephant trunk ending in a hand, and other motifs associated with Benin court art.

== Ceremonial and spiritual significance ==
The stools have significance within the ceremonial life of the Benin monarchy. The Benin royal stools are described as sacred objects associated with kingship, ancestral relationships and royal ritual. They were used during coronation ceremonies and other rites connected with the Oba and his relationship with his ancestors. The stools' significance was therefore not limited to their artistic or material qualities. Their ritual use connected them with the continuity of the Benin monarchy and with the customary practices surrounding the installation and authority of an Oba. The ceremonial importance of the stools was an important factor in the restitution efforts of Akenzua II. When the German museum refused to surrender the originals in the 1930s, Akenzua II agreed to pay for replicas so that the royal institution could continue to possess stools suitable for ceremonial use.

== Removal during the 1897 expedition ==
The stools were removed from the Benin royal palace following the British military expedition against Benin in February 1897. The expedition resulted in the capture and destruction of Benin City and the removal of a large number of royal and ceremonial objects from the palace.

The objects removed from Benin included brass plaques, sculptures, ivory works, royal regalia and other objects associated with the political, religious and ceremonial life of the kingdom. The stools were later dispersed into European museum collections.

== Early restitution demands ==
=== Eweka II's request ===
The first request for the return of the royal stools was made by Eweka II in 1914, following the restoration of the Benin monarchy under British colonial rule.

Eweka II made an informal request to British authorities for the return of the stools, but the request was unsuccessful.

=== Akenzua II's requests ===
Akenzua II succeeded Eweka II as Oba of Benin in 1933. The question of the royal stools continued under his reign, and he renewed the request for their return during his coronation period. He sought assistance from British colonial officials in tracing the objects. In February 1935 he raised the matter with Ivor Windsor-Clive, 2nd Earl of Plymouth, then associated with the British Colonial Office.

The Berlin museum authorities refused to return the original stools but offered to have replicas made. The replicas were commissioned in 1938 and arrived in Lagos on 5 January 1939. Akenzua II paid 1,582 Reichsmarks for their production, while the original stools remained in Berlin.

== Modern restitution negotiations ==
In October 2021, Germany and Nigeria signed a pre-agreement concerning the restitution of Benin Bronzes and future museum cooperation. On 1 July 2022, Germany and Nigeria signed a Joint Declaration concerning the return of Benin Bronzes and bilateral museum cooperation. The agreement provided for the transfer of ownership of Benin objects held in German public collections to Nigeria and established a framework for continued cooperation between German and Nigerian museums. The Nigerian National Commission for Museums and Monuments (NCMM) was involved in the repatriation process. In December 2022, 22 Benin objects returned by Germany were handed over and presented to the public in Nigeria. Ten of the objects came from the Ethnologisches Museum of the Staatliche Museen zu Berlin. The German restitution process represented a significant change from the position taken by German museum authorities during Akenzua II's campaign in the 1930s, when the original stools were not returned and replicas were supplied instead.

== Return to Nigeria ==
The two royal stools were among the Benin objects returned to Nigeria through the German restitution process in December 2022. On 18 May 2024, the National Commission for Museums and Monuments formally handed the stools to Ewuare II, Oba of Benin, at the Benin Royal Palace in Benin City. The ceremony included members of the Benin royal family and chiefs. Ewuare II sat on one of the returned stools during the ceremony.

== See also ==
- Oba Eresoyen
- Oba Esigie
- Akenzua II
- Eweka II
- Ewuare II
- Benin Bronzes
- Benin Expedition of 1897
- Ethnologisches Museum
