= Thompson Iyamu =

Prince Thompson Iyamu
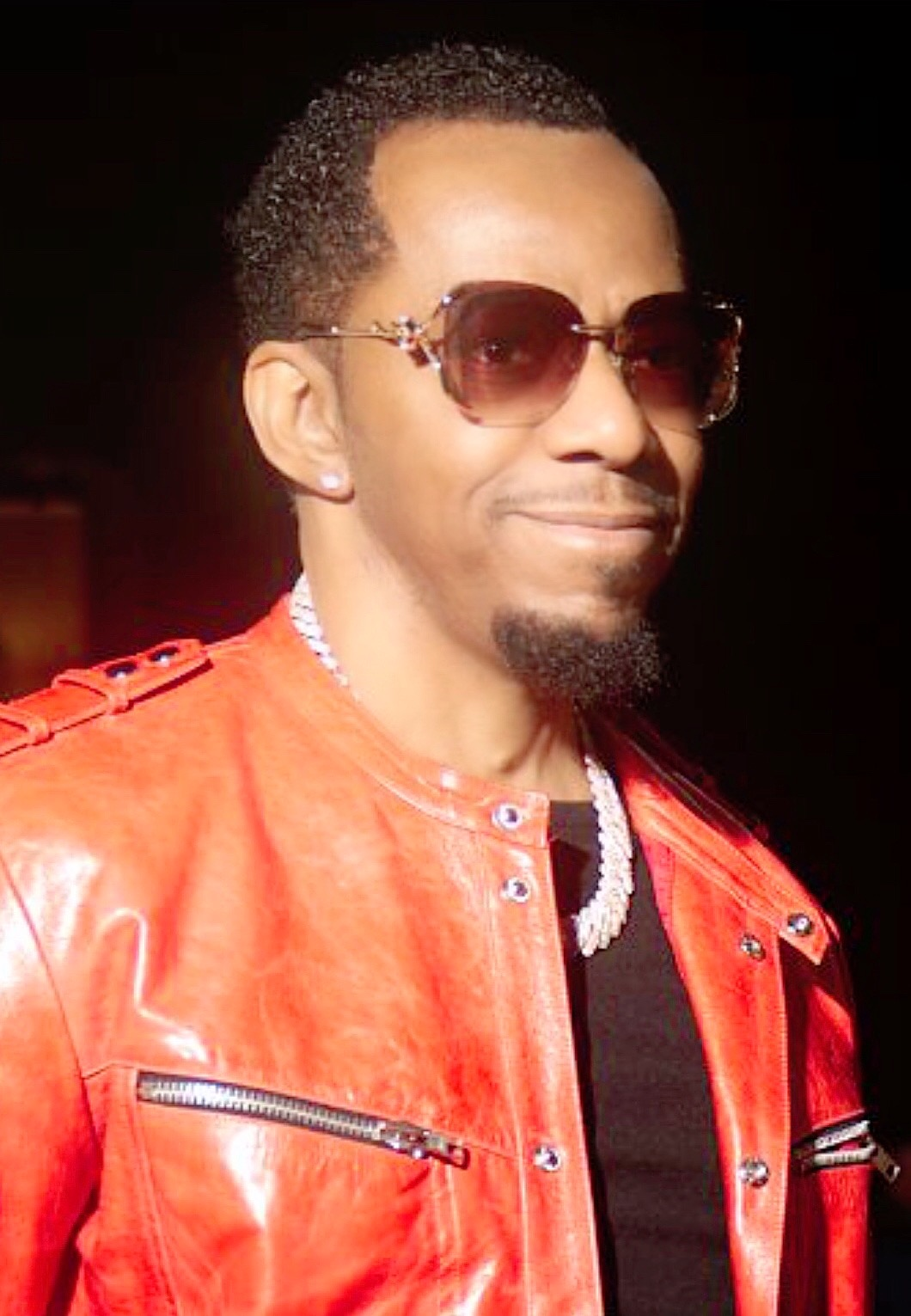

Background information
- Also known as: P Tee Money
- Born: 22 October 1968 (age 57); Islington, London
- Genres: EDM, Dance, Pop, Afro-beat, Electronica, House
- Occupations: DJ/EDM producer, remixer, Singer, Actor and writer
- Instruments: Synthesizer, Personal computer, MIDI controller, Drum machine, Sampler
- Years active: 1990–present
- Label: P Tee Money Music
- Website: pteemoney.com

Thompson Iyamu (born 22 October 1968), known by his stage name P Tee Money, is a British DJ, producer and actor known for his music and film. He is also a singer, remixer and author.

Iyamu is a grandson of Akenzua II, Oba of Benin from 1933 to 1978. He is also the founder of the African film & music award (AFMA).

== Early life and education ==
Iyamu was born in Islington, London to a Cypriot Jewish mother and a Nigerian father. His maternal grandfather was Nigerian, and his mother comes from a Cypriot Jewish heritage. He is the first son and second born out of six siblings from his mother. He is also a member of the Benin Royal Family as the grandson of Akenzua II and nephew of Princess Elizabeth Olowu. He was introduced to music at a young age, with early influences including George Duke and Earth, Wind & Fire.

At the age of four, his family moved to Nigeria where he completed his primary school, then was moved to a military academy. He received a degree in aeronautical engineering from the Nigerian Defence Academy. He later moved to London in 1988.

== Career ==
Iyamu started using the stage name P Tee Money when he began his career as a DJ in the early nineties. He toured the UK with female Rap artist Weird MC in the latter half of 1990 and throughout 1991. His style developed into progressive house.

In 2018, Iyamu collaborated with producers Matthew S and Dirty Freek on a remix album of the song "When I Came Up" with Bon Villan, a Toronto-based indie electronic trio group. On 8 September 2019 Iyamu and Morocco-based producer Yeves released a Dance Album; Bass Trouble which he co-wrote and co-produced.

On 16 May 2020 he released a single; Make some noise during the COVID-19 pandemic period which generated over 50,000 streams in the first week of release. On 22 July 2020 he released a new album; You Don't Care. One of the songs from the album contained an up-tempo beat that was influenced by music from the 1980s which featured Addie Nicole.

In November 2020, he released a new Afro beat single Overdose on Freshness collaborating with Pat-E, which he co-produced. On 1 January 2021 he released a new single titled Scream Out Loud (Banger Mix). On 12 March 2021 he released a new Spanish single titled Vamonos.

On 28 May 2021 Iyamu was featured on DJ S’ Tingling EP which he also co-produced and was released through his record label P Tee Money Music. On 4 July 2021 he released a new afro-beat sing titled Caterpillar.

On 21 August 2021, he released a new single OOzing featuring Pat-E. On 3 February 2022, he came back with a new single 360 on the highway.

Iyamu released his 8th EP Album, Tungba, on 17 November 2022 which contains the singles, Overdose on freshness and Money (featuring P at-E). On 14 January 2023 he released a new single Do ki Do. Shortly after he released a single Come to Daddy on 31 August 2023. On 7 June 2024 he released a new single title Low waist.

=== Writing ===
In 2015, Iyamu launched his first book titled The Players Code which was intended as a less predatory take on pickup artistry.

In 2016, he released another book titled The Players Code Unleashed. He has also written series of erotic romance novels. In 2019 Iyamu published two more books Being Whit You and Wild Seduction, adding to his series of collections.

=== Public Image ===
Upon releasing his new single, 360 on the highway, Iyamu has been described by social media influencers and news medias as The most searched African celebrity on Google.

=== Books ===
- Being Whit You ISBN 9781513647975
- Wild Seduction ISBN 9781635870657
- The Players Code ISBN 9781483552675
- The Players Code Unleashed ISBN 9781483585987

== Discography ==
=== Albums ===
Year	Album
2017	Rebirth
2017	Bounce
2018	Sandstorm
2018	I'm Not Afraid
2019	I Won't Stop
2019	Bass Trouble
2020	You Don't Care
2022	Tungba

=== Collaboration albums ===
Year	Title	Artists
2018	When I Came Up (Remixes)	Bon Villan
2019	Bass Trouble	P Tee Money & Yeves
2021	Dominium	DJ S' Tingling
2022	Fight To Death: Rematch	Sappho
2024	2024 Countdown in the Sky (Remixes)	Sappho

=== Singles ===
Year	Title	Artists
2017	Lights out	P Tee Money
2017	Good Time	P Tee Money
2017	Free your mind	P Tee Money (feat. Aqua)
2017	Heat Up	P Tee Money
2017	No Sweat	P Tee Money
2017	Wind it Up (Remix)	P Tee Money
2017	Shake That	P Tee Money
2017	Drop	P Tee Money
2017	I Got You	P Tee Money
2017	Wind it Up	P Tee Money
2018	Tropical Dream	P Tee Money
2018	The Face in my dreams	P Tee Money (feat. Addie Nicole)
2018	You are my one	P Tee Money (feat. Nina Storey)
2018	The Swagg	P Tee Money
2018	Everytime	P Tee Money
2018	Attention	P Tee Money (feat, Rasheed)
2018	Summer 2005	P Tee Money
2019	Time is the greatest healer	P Tee Money
2019	Drown	P Tee Money (feat. Smoothie)
2019	Global	P Tee Money (feat. Pat-E)
2019	Money	P Tee Money (feat. Pat-E)
2019	Her Body	P Tee Money
2020	I Don't wonna know	P Tee Money (feat. Addie Nicole)
2020	Finders Keepers	P Tee Money (feat. Smoothie)
2020	Make Some Noise	P Tee Money
2020	Overdose on Freshness	P Tee Money & Pat-E
2021	Scream Out Loud (Banger Mix)	P Tee Money
2021	Vamonos	P Tee Money
2021	Caterpillar	P Tee Money
2021	OOzing	P Tee Money feat, Pat- E
2022	360 on the highway	P Tee Money
2022	Dumsor	P Tee Money
2022	Do Ki Do	P Tee Money
2023	In Need Of You	P Tee Money
2023	Come To Daddy	P Tee Money
2024	Low Waist	P Tee Money

== Philanthropy ==
Iyamu has set up a charity with the purpose of helping young people to start their own businesses. He is known for helping some of his fans who need help paying for their college tuition, and he has opened a charity for this purpose. He is responsible for providing for some of the youths from the village he supports in Edo state, Nigeria with free education, through his financial donations.

== Personal life ==
In February 2021, Iyamu lost one of his siblings and shortly afterwards he lost his father.

== See also ==
- Akenzua II
- Akenzua family
- Princess Elizabeth Olowu
- Peju Layiwola
