= Hijarbie Doll =

Fashion doll

Hijarbie is a fashion doll created by a Nigerian with the raw materials sourced from China. Hijarbie was launched in 2016 by a visual artist Haneefah Adam who is credited with the creation of the doll because of her interest in seeing dolls dressed in a way that resonates with the Islamic religion.
