= Izevbokun Oshodin =

Chief in the ancient Benin Empire

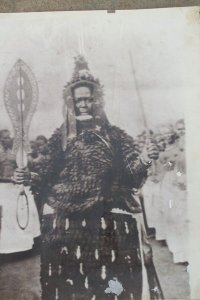
Chief Izevbokun Oshodin in full royal regalia during one of the royal festivals.

Izevbokun Oshodin (also Izevbokun Osodin) (c. 1850–1929) was a chief in the ancient Benin Empire in Edo State of Nigeria. He was one of the loyal lieutenants of Oba (king) Ovonramwen, the exiled ruler of Benin who worked with the British colonial authorities to administer what was left of the ancient kingdom of Benin after the Benin Massacre and the subsequent military operation against Benin that destroyed most of the city in 1897. He was first appointed a Warrant Chief and member of the Native Council constituted by the new British Resident. He was later appointed District Head of Benin Districts by the British colonial government from 1914-1924 and served as the District Head of Benin City from 1924-1929. He died on 11 April 1929 in Benin City during the reign of Oba Eweka II.

He was one of the few chiefs in Benin Kingdom who built and lived in expansive palaces that were characteristic of the nobility of the ancient kingdom and formed part of what has intrigued many scholars about the architecture of ancient Benin. His palace, built in 1897, after the return to normalcy following the punitive war, still stands till date and is located at the beginning of Sakponba Road near the busy King's Square in Benin City.
