= Maduka =

- Gender: Male
- Language: Igbo

Origin
- Origin: Igbo
- Meaning: People are greater/better
- Region of origin: Igboland

Maduka // is a male Igbo name. It translates to mean "people are greater/better". Maduka is also shot for common Igbo expressions such as "Mmadụ-ka-eji-aka: We prevail with the help of other people" and "Mmadu-ka-aku": People are better than riches.

== Notable people with the name ==
- Maduka Okoye, Nigerian footballer
- Cosmas Maduka, Nigerian businessman
- Godwin Maduka, Nigerian doctor, businessman and philanthropist
- Samuel Maduka Onyishi, Nigerian businessman
- Vincent I. Maduka, Nigerian engineer and broadcaster
- Joana Maduka, Nigerian engineer
- Valerian Maduka Okeke, Catholic archbishop
- Ekene Emeka Maduka, Canadian-Nigerian contemporary artist
