= Amanze =

- Gender: male
- Language: Igbo

Origin
- Origin: Nigeria
- Meaning: the Amah of upstanding men
- Region of origin: Igboland

Amanze (audio) is a male given name and surname of Igbo origin. It means "nze's Amah", in other words, "the Amah of upstanding men". In Igbo culture, the Amah is a communal piece of land.

== Notable people with this name ==
- Amanze Egekeze (born December 3, 1995), Nigerian-American athlete
- ruby onyinyechi amanze (born 1982), Nigerian-born British artist
