= Call Me by Your Name =

Call Me by Your Name may refer to:

- Call Me by Your Name (novel), a 2007 novel by André Aciman
- Call Me by Your Name (film), a 2017 film based on the novel, directed by Luca Guadagnino
  - Call Me by Your Name: Original Motion Picture Soundtrack, the soundtrack to the 2017 film Call Me by Your Name
- Call Me by Your Name, a 2015 album by Matthew S and Von Felthen
- "Call Me by Your Name", a 2022 song by Sophie Castillo
- "Montero (Call Me by Your Name)", a 2021 song by Lil Nas X
