= Lifestyle (EP) =

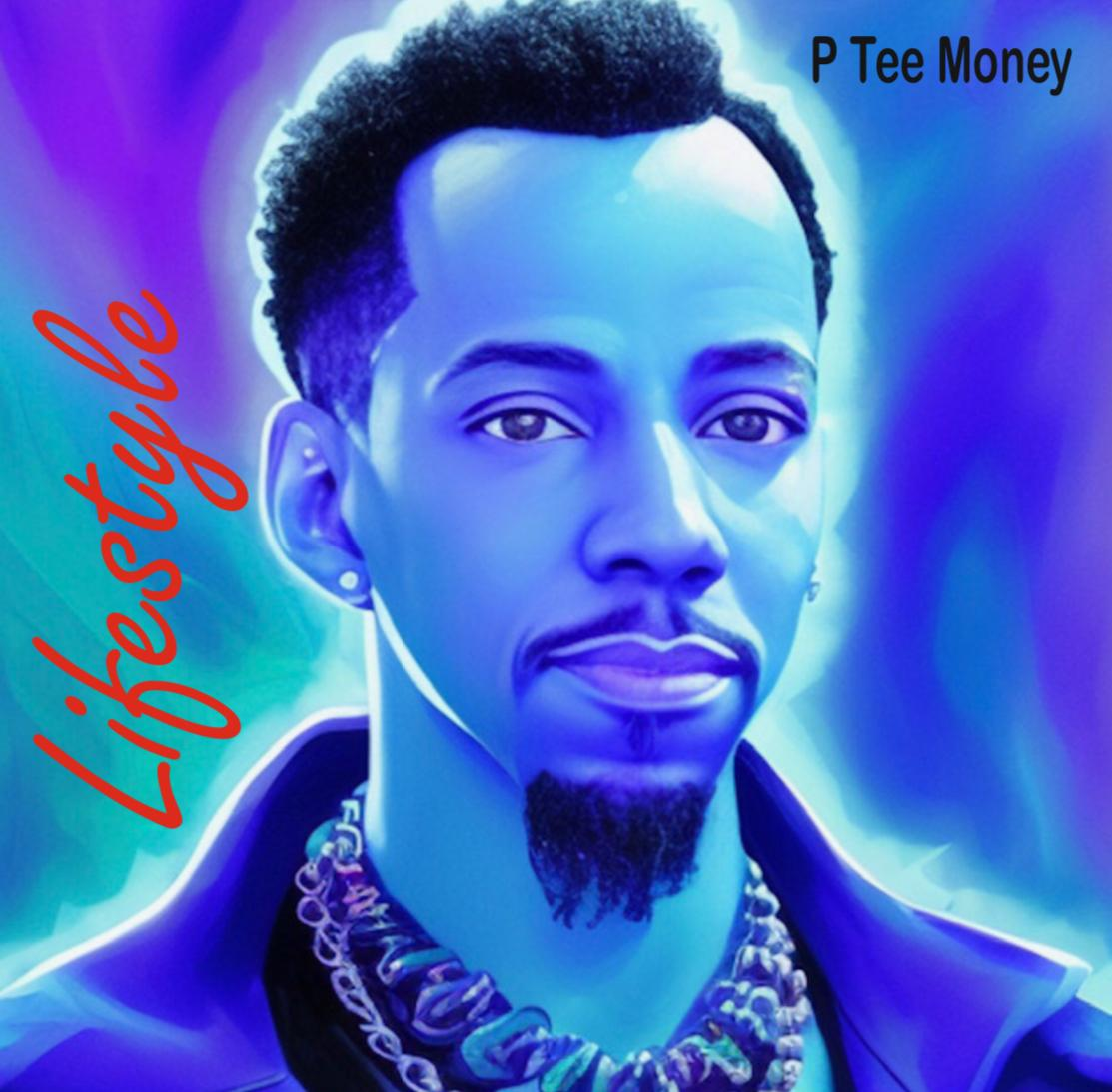

EP by P Tee Money
- Released: 12 September 2025
- Recorded: 2025
- Genres: Afrobeat, amapiano, electronic
- Length: 18:32
- Label: Independent
- Producers: Thompson Iyamu, Wendy Tingling, Fatt Beatz

P Tee Money chronology
Tungba (2022)	Lifestyle (2025)

Lifestyle is the ninth extended play (EP) released by British–Nigerian artist P Tee Money (Thompson Iyamu). It comprises five tracks blending Afrobeat, Amapiano, and electronic elements. The release received coverage for its streaming impact and radio rotation in both the United Kingdom and Africa.

== Production and release ==
Lifestyle combines Afrobeat rhythms with Amapiano percussion and electronic textures. The Production is credited to Thompson Iyamu and Wendy Tingling on tracks 2–5, while Fatt Beatz produced track 1.

The EP was released on 12 September 2025 across major streaming platforms.

Promotion included social media campaigns, audiovisual teasers, and a music video for the title track. The EP trended on Audiomack and received radio airplay in both the UK and Africa.

== Reception ==
The release received multiple media coverage for its streaming impact and radio rotation in both the United Kingdom and Africa. It also attracted a positive review from KBLA 1580.

== Track listing ==
All tracks are written by Thompson Iyamu.

No.	Title	Producer	Length
1.	"Spray Money"	Fatt Beatz	3:33
2.	"Money Dey"	Thompson Iyamu, Wendy Tingling	3:47
3.	"Lifestyle"	Thompson Iyamu, Wendy Tingling	4:25
4.	"Tomorrow"	Thompson Iyamu, Wendy Tingling	3:45
5.	"No Space"	Thompson Iyamu, Wendy Tingling	3:02
Total length:			18:32
