= Scapin =

Distribution of the Scapin family in Italy

Scapin is an Italian surname, frequent in the region of Veneto in northeastern Italy, especially in the provinces of Padua and Vicenza. The name is possibly derived from "scabinos", a Medieval Latin adaptation of Frankish "Skabins", found in Lombardic legislation designating a category of minor government officials forming a corps qualified in legal proceedings. An alternate etymology is that it would be derived from "scappino", dialectal Italian for the upper part of footwear. Still another possibility is that it comes from the word for flee or escape. Found throughout the region since the 16th century, with several variants, such as Scapinello (provinces of Treviso and Udine), Scapinelli (provinces of Modena and Bologna), Scabin (most concentrated in the province of Rovigo), Scappin (province of Treviso) and Scappini (provinces of Verona and Firenze). The surname Scapin is currently present in 284 Italian cities.

Notable people with the surname include:

- Matteo Scapin, known as Matthew S, Italian electronic music producer, musician and composer
- Ylenia Scapin, Italian judoka
