= Olowu =

Olowu may refer to

- the Olowu of Owu Kingdom, paramount Yoruba king of Owu kingdom

Olowu is the name of

- Princess Elizabeth Olowu (born 1939), Nigerian princess and sculptor
- Karim Olowu (born 1924), Nigerian sprinter and long jumper
- Pius Olowu (born (1948), Uganda sprinter
- Duro Olowu, British fashion designer
- Joseph Olowu (born 1999), English footballer
