= Igun Street =

Historic street of bronze casters

- Igun-Eronmwon Quarters
- Interactive map of Igun Street
- Area: Benin City
- Addresses: Igun St, Avbiama, Benin City, Nigeria.
- Postal code: 300231
- Coordinates: 6°20′23.8″N 5°37′59.6″E

Other
- Known for: Benin Bronzes

Igun Street, also known as Igun-Eronmwon Quarters, is a street situated in Benin City, Edo State, Nigeria. This street is renowned for being the residence of the Guild of Benin Bronze and Brass Casters, known as the Igun-Eronmwon. Notably, it stands as the second most frequented tourist attraction within Benin City. Tourists, art dealers, and collectors routinely visit Igun Street to observe the comprehensive process involved in crafting these objects.

Igun-Eronmwon Quarters is situated off Sakponba Road, a short distance from the Ring Road Roundabout.

== History ==
Igun-Eronmwon Quarters was established during the second Ogisoship period of the first Benin royal dynasty by Ogiso Ere (16 – 66 A.D). It was referred to as 'Obayagbon' during this time, translating to 'all land belongs to the king'.

Igun-Eronmwon Quarters remained within the Benin Palace Royal Grounds until 1897. During the reign of Oba Esigie (1504 – 1550), bronze casting evolved into elaborate art forms such as plaques, which served religious, record-keeping, and commercial purposes. Oba Esigie solidified the trade monopoly of the Guild of Benin Royal Bronze Casters, designating quarters specifically for them. In November 1899, seven Royal chiefs of Benin reported that the place had suffered damage during the Benin Expedition of 1897.

In 1914, when the Benin throne was restored to Eweka II, Oba Ovonramwen’sfirst son, some of the craftsmen who had fled during the war returned, and the quarters were moved to Igun Street. The craftsmen were encouraged to replicate the objects that had been taken by the British, and they began rebuilding their practice. Restrictions on the sale of artworks were also lifted. Oba Akenzua II (1933 – 1978) furthered this work during his rule, advocating for the return of looted artifacts.

== The Guild of Benin Bronze Casters ==
The Guild of Benin Bronze Casters preserves Benin history and historical artifacts. The guild's artworks transmit Benin history across generations. The Oba of Benin holds authority over their activities and grants franchises to craftsmen with ancestral ties to Igun Street, where past generations practiced bronze and brass craftsmanship for Obas.

The Inneh N’Igun-Ẹrọnmwọn serves as the head of the guild, responsible for safeguarding the art of bronze casting in Benin. This position is hereditary. A literate member, not hereditary, is appointed as the secretary to document proceedings. Currently, Eric Ogbemudia holds the position of secretary.

Guild members share a common ancestry. Only descendants of the original seven families from Igun Street have the privilege to practice as Benin bronze and brass casters. They have maintained this exclusive right since the era of Igueghae, the first leader of the guild during Ogiso Ere's reign. Over centuries, the kings granted them this privilege in exchange for meeting specific needs of the royal palace. They produced bronze and brass sculptures for the Oba, chiefs, and priests within Benin City and the Benin Kingdom.

Following the sacking of the Kingdom of Benin in 1897, the necessity to fulfill palace requirements diminished. With the authorization to practice and trade, bronze casters establish their workshops and craft sculptures for global trade, alongside addressing the Oba's needs. Their traditional bronze casting methods have endured through generations without significant changes. The guild's secretive techniques remain inaccessible to outsiders.

== Proof of ownership ==
Anyone owning a Benin bronze and brass artwork must have proof of purchase from Igun Street. Every buyer of Benin Bronze artwork is issued with a receipt and a duplicate kept by the workshop.

== See also ==
- Benin Moat
- Art of the Kingdom of Benin
- Benin Bronzes
