= W. D. Webster =

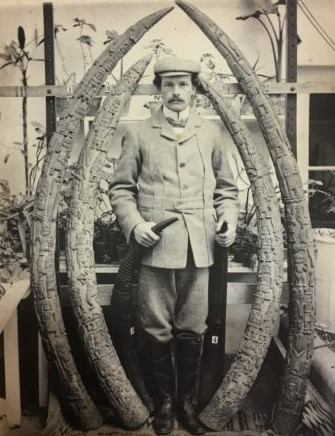
William D. Webster (dealer in Benin artifacts) with carved ivory tusks, circa 1890.

William Downing Webster (11 May 1868 – 14 January 1913) was a British ethnographic dealer and collector, best known for his collection gathered from material seized by British troops during the Benin Expedition of 1897.

== Life ==
Webster was born in 1868 in Greenwich to Robert Burrow Webster and his wife, Sarah Webster. Although his father was in the potato trade, Webster was initially employed as a stained glass designer in Lancaster before becoming a dealer in ethnographic antiquities in the 1890s. In 1891 he married Agnes Harrison in Kendal. His marriage broke up and he separated from his wife and two daughters. He lived with Eva Cutter, another ethnographic and antiquities dealer and the daughter of William D. Cutter, in London. He divorced his first wife and married Cutter in 1907. William died from alcoholism in Effingham in 1913 and is reportedly buried at Kensal Green Cemetery.

== Career as a Dealer and Collector ==
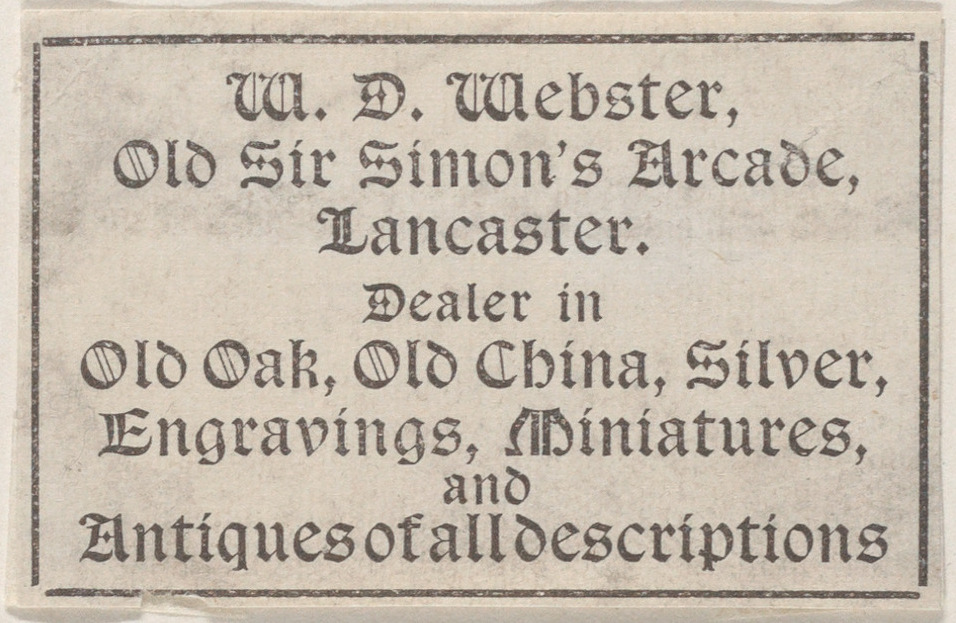
Trade card for W. D. Webster

Webster began dealing in and collecting ethnographic antiquities in the 1890s. He formed a partnership with his brother Robert Burrow Webster and carried on business as W.D. Webster, Ethnographic Traders. The business published a series of catalogues detailing items available for sale during the next two decades. A number of the catalogues had sketches and photographs representing the works he was trading. He also staged a number of exhibitions of ethnographic material at Earl's Court. In 1899 he travelled throughout Britain purchasing material from British soldiers returning from the Benin Expedition, amassing a large quantity of material that was carefully recorded in his catalogues. He kept good business records recording his correspondence and stock movements. On 31 December 1900 the business partnership with his brother was dissolved and he continued the business under the same name and on his own account. In 1904 he sold a significant portion of his collection in a five-day auction in London but continued to trade until his death. His second wife Eva Cutter continued to trade under the name of his business until 1926.

His business records were acquired by the Museum of New Zealand Te Papa Tongarewa, possibly as part of the New Zealand government purchase of the W. O. Oldman collection in 1948 or possibly via the work of Kenneth Athol Webster.

== Provenance interest ==
The business records of W. D. Webster are of high interest to researchers working on cultural object provenance and research into commercial traders and trading of cultural objects. One example is the Digital Benin project. This website lists over 130 institutions in 20 countries with Benin cultural heritage in their collections and the provenance of those objects, where known. The records of W. D. Webster are a key provenance link.
