= Peju Layiwola =

Nigerian artist, sculptor and academic

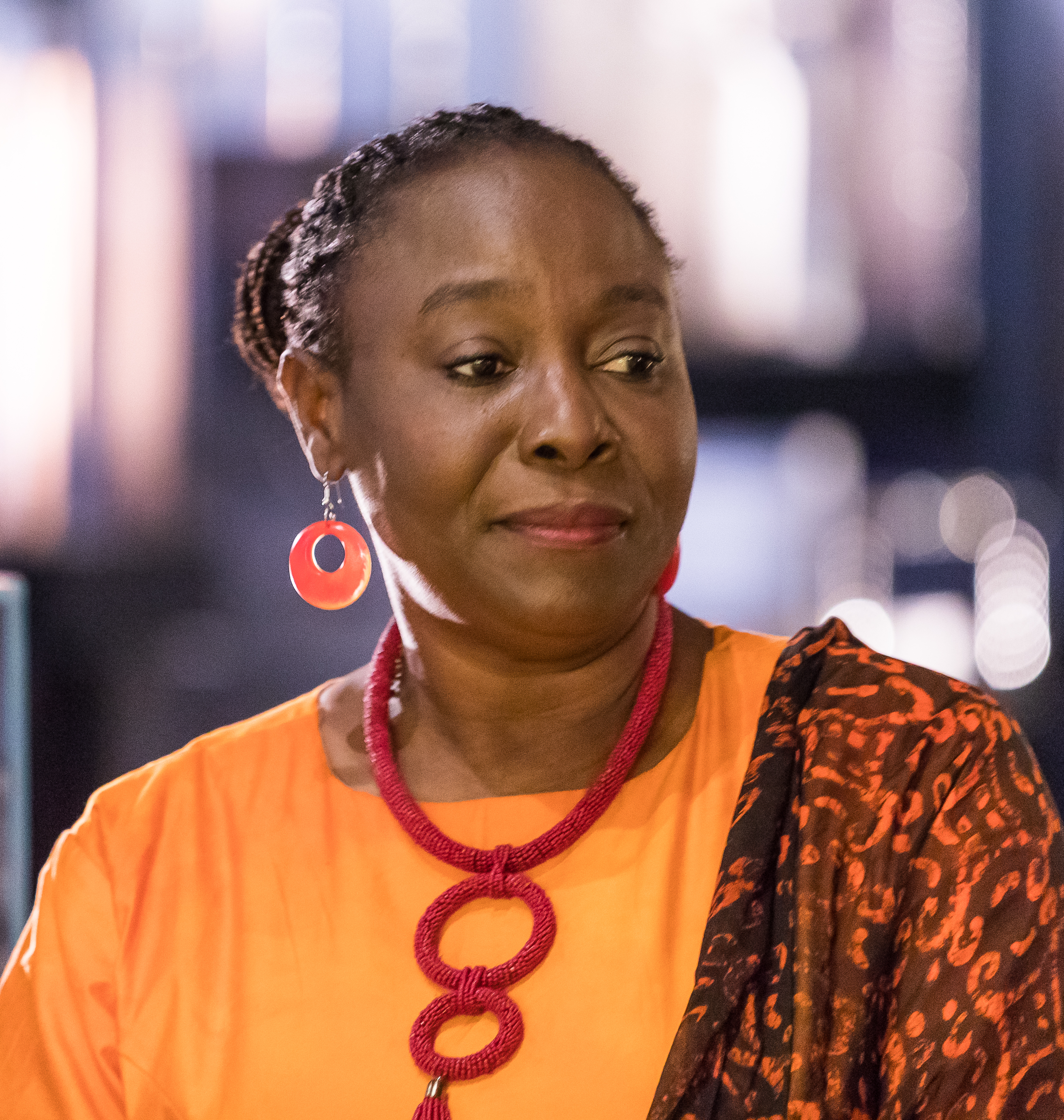
- Peju Layiwola in a press conference during restitution of artworks at Rautenstrauch-Joest-Museum
- Born: Adépéjú Olówu; 29 September 1967; Benin City, Edo State, Nigeria
- Education: University of Ibadan University of Benin
- Alma mater: University of Ibadan, University of Benin
- Occupations: Artist, sculptor, professor
- Parent(s): Babátúndé Ọlátòkunbọ̀ Olówu, Princess Elizabeth Olowu (née Akenzua)
- Website: pejulayiwola.com

Peju Layiwola, is an art historian and visual artist from Nigeria who works in a variety of media and genre. She is listed as a "21st Century Avant-Garde" in the book Art Cities of the Future published by Phaidon Press. She is currently a Professor of Art and Art history at the University of Lagos and has been described as a "multi-talented artist." Her works can be found in the collection of Microsoft Lagos, Yemisi Shyllon Museum, Pan Atlantic, Lagos and homes of private collectors such as JP and Ebun Clark and the Obi of Onitsha.

== Biography ==
Born Adepeju Olowu, Layiwola is the daughter of Babatunde Olatokunbo Olowu and Princess Elizabeth Olowu (née Akenzua). Her paternal grandfather was a business magnate who established the first cinema and printing press in Benin and the Delta region in the old Midwestern state. Her maternal grandfather, meanwhile, was Oba Akenzua II, king of Benin, who reigned from 1933 to 1978. Layiwola has built on the artistic tradition of her mother, Princess Elizabeth Olowu, the first female bronze caster in Nigeria, a status she achieved through resilience in a culture that is very patriarchal. Her dual Yoruba and Edo heritage and history has inspired her professional practice.

== Educational background ==
Layiwola started her primary education at Emotan preparatory school, had a length of time at St Maria Goretti College and graduated. She began her secondary education at the Federal Government girls college at Benin city, she proceeded to the University of Ibadan where she studied Art History and University of Benin (Nigeria) where she studied Visual art history.

== Professional background ==
Layiwola received a BA (Metal Design) from University of Benin in 1988, and an MA and PhD (Visual Arts) from the University of Ibadan, Nigeria in 2004. She is the founder of the Women and Youth Art Foundation, an organisation committed to empowering women, young girls and youth through the arts. She has also served on art juries. Layiwola, who initially began working with metal, now explores a broad range of media that engage with history, memory and cultural expropriation.

Her focus is on personal and communal history with the Benin kingdom's dual status as both ancient and modern as a focal point. Much of her work emphasizes themes such as the colonization of sacred assets from the Benin kingdom and asserting her place in the male dominated field of bronze casting. Layiwola is also an advocate against artifact pillaging, and argues in favor of repatriation and restitution.

In her most ambitious solo exhibition, Benin1897.com:Art and the Restitution Question (2010), Layiwola's return to the punitive expedition to Benin in 1897 and the looting of prized cultural artifacts from the bedchamber of her forebears brings together her personal and communal history. Her other collaborative public project, Whose Centenary? (2014) is also informed by history and the archives. She gave a talk at the Rhode Island School of Design in 2019, and one at the CAA-Getty International Program in 2018 on her work.

Of her work and inspiration, she says "I got a lot of inspiration from my mother, having seen her as a young girl casting in metal. So, I opted for metal design at the University of Benin, which was broader spectrum from what she studied because she did metal casting under sculpture. But I specialize in metal design, which incorporates jewelry production, metal casting etc."

As a feminist Layiwola has dedicated her time to empowering women through education in the arts. Layiwola's art projects and mentorship programs have been described as having had an impact on generations of younger artists around Nigeria. Layiwola currently hosts workshops on a traditional form of tie dye called adire, which involves dying cotton cloth an indigo color using a starch resist made of cassava flour. Layiwola would go on to launch a solo exhibition titled "Indigo reimagined" in 2019, that highlights different types of traditional Yoruba and Edo crafts such as poetry, metalwork and various dyed textiles.

== Teaching career ==
Layiwola started her career at University of Benin in 1991 and went on to the University of Lagos in 2002. She rose to the role of Acting head of Creative Arts at the University of Lagos from 2013 to 2015 and the head from 2017 to 2020. She pushed for an overhaul in the curricula and edited the first journal of the department. Under her tenure, the Lagoon gallery was established a contemporary community engagement platform at the University of Lagos.

== Selected awards ==
- The Sub-Saharan Africa (SSA) Arts Cultural Exchange grant (2021/2022)
- Life member and Distinguished Scholar Award, Lagos Studies Association, (2021)
- Honorary award and recognition by the state of Arkansas- Ambassador of Goodwill Award, State of Arkansas (2019)
- Nominated Tyson Scholar, Crystal Bridges Museum of American Art, Bentonville, Arkansas Fall Semester (2019–2020).
- African Multiple Cluster of Excellence, University of Bayreuth Grant, 2020
- African Multiple Cluster of Excellence, University of Bayreuth, Germany grant (2019–2020)
- Distinguished Visiting Scholar at the University of Arkansas (2019–2020)
- Tyson Scholar at the Crystal Bridges Museum, Bentonville, USA (2019)
- Terra Foundation for American Art Grant (2018–2019)
- CAA-Getty Alumni grant (2018)
- US Alumni Exchange Award (2018)
- Terra Foundation grant for American Art in 2018
- Goethe Resident Artist grant, (KNW) in Düsseldorf in 2017
- US Consulate Small Grant (2017)
- Distinguished Researchers Award Faculty of Arts, University of Lagos 2007
- Nominated for the International Visitors Leadership Program (IVLP) on the cultural preservation programme in the United States (2012)
- NYSC Merit Award Lagos State1989
- The Best Graduating Student at the University of Benin Art School in 1988
- Departmental prize in Applied Arts in 1987

== Advocacy for return of stolen art ==
Layiwola has led public advocacy for the return of art works stolen from Benin during the Punitive Expedition of 1897.

== Selected writings ==
- Layiwola Peju (2017) Transcultural Conversations: American Art and Nigerian Art in Dialogue, Nka: Journal of Contemporary African Art-41, November, NKA Publications, NY, pp. 140– 152.
- Layiwola, Peju (2017). 'Festivals and the Sustenance of a Collective Memory', Book review article. A calendar of Traditional Nigerian Festivals by Frank Aig Imuokhuede, Eyo Journal, 20, Vol 2.
- Layiwola, Peju (2016) 'Art at the Heart of Giving: Bruce Onobrakpeya and the Harmattan Workshop in Retrospect, Onobrakpeya and the Harmattan Workshop, SMO Contemporary, (16 September – 16 December 2016), Lagos Court of Arbitration, Lagos.
- Layiwola, Peju (2015) 'Whose Centenary? Public Art Project as an Expression of Colonial Memory' Nigeria Field Society Journal, 85 th Anniversary, No 80, pp. 51–68.
- Layiwola, Peju (2015) 'Ben Enwonwu's The Risen Christ as a Religious Icon at the University of Ibadan' The City State of Ibadan: Text and Context Ed. Dele Layiwola, A publication of the Institute of African Studies, University of Ibadan in collaboration with Bookbuilders (Editions Africa), Ibadan. pp. 169–176
- Layiwola, Peju (2015) Walker and the Restitution of Two Benin Bronzes, Eyo Journal of the Arts and Humanities, Maiden Edition, Department of Creative Arts, University of Lagos. Ed. Peju Layiwola. pp 175–185.
- Layiwola Peju (2014) Clad in Gold: The Art of the Jewel Smith in Ibadan: African Notes, vol 33, No. 1&amp;2, Journal of the Institute of African Studies, University of Ibadan, Nigeria. pp. 18–26.
- Layiwola Peju (2014) Making Meaning from a Fragmented Past: 1897 and the Creative Process, Disturbing Pasts: Memories, controversies and Creativity, Open Arts Journal, The Open University UK, Ed. Leon Wainwright, Summer Issue 3, pp. 86–96.
- Layiwola, Peju (2014) A Walk through the Hearth, Mandela: Tributes to a Global Icon. Ed. Toyin Falola, Carolina Academic Press, Durham, North Carolina. pp. 288–289
- Layiwola Peju (2013) Dele Jegede and His Enduring Legacy at the University of Lagos, Parodies of a Nation: Nigeria and the Art of Dele Jegede, Eds. Aderonke Adesola Adesanya and Toyin Falola, Africa World Press, USA. pp. 369–378
- Layiwola Peju (2013) 'From Footnote to Main Text: Re/Framing Women Artists from Nigeria' in Africa and Its Diaspora in Africa and Its Diasporas, n.paradoxa, Ed Katy Deepwell, KT Press UK and Andy Warhol Foundation for the Visual Arts, New York, Vol.31, pp. 78–87
- Layiwola Peju (2012) 'Welding the Lethal to the Unusual: Olu Amoda and the Art of Metal Assemblage', Cequel: Shattering the Barriers of Artistic Conventions, Ed. Ohioma Ifuonu Pogoson, Institute of African Studies, University of Ibadan, Ibadan. pp. 112–123.
- Layiwola Peju (2010) 'Lace Culture and the Art of Dressing Well in Nigeria', African Lace: A History of Trade, Creativity and Fashion in Nigeria, Eds. Barbara Plankensteiner and Mayo Adediran, Museum of Ethnology, Vienna (Museum fur Volkerkunde,), National Commission for Museums and Monuments, Nigeria, Snoeck Publishers, Rudy Vecruysse, Ghent, pp. 167–180.
- Layiwola Peju (2010) 'Resurrecting the Disappeared: A Recontextualisation of 1897', Benin 1897.com: Art and the Restitution Question, Eds. Peju Layiwola and Sola Olorunyomi, Wy Art Editions, Ibadan, pp. 1–12
- Layiwola Peju (2009) Calabashes as Receptacles of Traditional Medicine and Repositories of Culture Amongst the Yoruba People of Southwestern Nigeria.' in A Textbook of Medicinal Plants in Nigeria, Ed. Tolu Odugbemi, University of Lagos Press, Lagos. Pp 81 – 92
- Layiwola Peju (2009) New Forms of Commemoration; Royal Textiles of Benin, The Nigerian Field, Vol. 74, 1 and 2, Pp. 5–19.
- Layiwola, Peju and Biayere, Kunle (2007) &#39;The Politics of Memory in the Dramatic Space: Two Distant Views of Ovonramwen N'ogbaisi' in Revisiting History Through the Arts, Ed. Peju Layiwola, National Gallery of Arts, Abuja, pp. 84–97.
- Layiwola, Adepeju (2007) 'Benin Massacre; Memories and Experiences', Benin Kings and Rituals, Court Arts from Nigeria, Museum of Ethnology, Vienna (Museum fur Volkerkunde Wien), Museum Qua Branly (Paris), Ethnologishes Staatliche Museen zu Berlin and the Art Institute Chicago, Ed. Barbara Plankensteiner, Snoeck Publishers, Rudy Vecruysse, Ghent, pp. 83–90.
- Layiwola Peju (2006) 'Tangible Heritage in Nigeria, 'Nigeria: Cultural and NaturalHeritage, A Unesco World Heritage publication, Ed. Rafael Valencia, Librose, Copernic, Viking, Barcelona, Spain. Pp. 280–305.
- Layiwola, Peju (1997). 'Gender Tempered Through Metal: Women in Bronze Casting in Benin, Nigeria' in Writing African Women: Gender, Popular Culture and Literature in West Africa. Ed. Stephanie Newell, Zed Press, London. pp. 191–197.

== Selected exhibitions ==
- Artificial Facts and Boundary Objects, 20 June – 20 September 2015, Kunsthaus Dresden, Municipal Gallery of Arts, Dresden, Germany/Objectas Fontera at CA2M in Madrid, Spain 4 November 2015 to 28 February 2016; Group travelling exhibition:
- Whose Centenary? Collaborative Public Art Project, Igun Street, Benin City, 6/7December 2014. Group public art performance and exhibition. Supported by the University of Lagos Research Grant
- Benin1897.com: Art and the Restitution Question, a Solo Traveling Exhibition by Peju Layiwola, Lagos, 8 April-30 May 2010, Main Auditorium Gallery, University of Lagos/The Museum, Institute of African Studies, University of Ibadan, Nigeria. Ibadan, 20 August-10 October 2010
- Joint show: Identities and Labels: Eight Contemporary Nigerian Women Artists, Pan African University Lagos, 24 September-8 October 2005
- Of Bronzes and Prints: a Mother/Daughter Perspective: an Exhibition of Sculptures, Reliefs and Prints. Goethe Institute Lagos, Two-person exhibition by Princess Elizabeth Olowu and Peju Layiwola. 14–25 June 2003.
- Solo Show: 'The African Woman: An Exhibition of Bronze Sculptures,' Flowerfield Arts Gallery, Portstewart, Northern Ireland, U.K, May 1996. Women, Art and Society: Queen's University of Belfast, Armagh Campus. N. Ireland, UK, September 1996
- Orimipe, performance at the opening and close of the Exhibition. Performed by Sixteen males to register the entry of males into the art of indigo dyeing which was predominantly a female preserve. The men developed the use of stencils for mass-producing these textile patterns. University of Lagos 2018-2019

== Residencies ==
- The Raw Residency, Rhodes University, Grahamstown, South Africa, 15 April- 15 June 2018.
- Artist-in –Residence, Kunstsammlung Nordrhein-Westfalen, Düsseldorf, Germany. 8 October-8 December 2017.

== Works cited in ==
- Tobenna Okwuosa (2017) Peju Layiwola's Art: An Engagement with Benin History and the 1897 Tragedy in The Art of Nigerian Women, Ben Bosah Books, USA. pp. 278–28.
- Antawan Bryan (2014) 'Peju Layiwola', Art Cities of the Future: 21 st Century Avant-Gardes, Phaidon Press, London pp. 178–179.
- Barbara Winston Blackmun (2013) Contemporary Contradictions: Bronzecasting in the Edo Kingdom of Benin', A Companion to Modern African Art. First Edition, Eds. Gitti Salami and Monica Blackmun Visona, John Wiley Blackwell and Sons, Inc. pp. 389–407.
- Freida High (2010) Benin1897.com: 'Peju Layiwola's Metamonument', Benin 1897.com: Art and the Restitution Question, Eds. Peju Layiwola and Sola Olorunyomi, Wy Art Editions, Ibadan, pp. 1–12 pp15–40

== Relevant interviews ==
- The Challenges Visual Art Face in Nigerian Universities – Peju Layiwola (Premium Times)

== See also ==
- Ikechukwu Francis Okoronkwo
- Stella Fakiyesi
- Nengi Omuku
