= Oroma Elewa =

Nigerian Performance Artist

- Born: Port Harcourt, Nigeria
- Known for: Pop'Africana
- Website: oromaelewa.com

Oroma Elewa is a Nigerian visual and performance artist, writer and creative director.

In her art, Elewa examines social constructs and their impact on identity, thought, expression and behavior. Her work is fundamentally concerned with reflecting upon and interrogating personal experiences that hold social, cultural, political and racial import, contemporary womanhood and, in her own words, ‘facets of Black identity, including the transnational African mindset, the diasporic experience, and [her] possession of a “Black Body.”’

The artist first came to prominence as the founding Editor-in-Chief and publisher of Pop’Africana, a fashion and art magazine that amplified contemporary African fashion, style and aesthetics to international audiences.

== Work ==
=== Pop’Africana 2009-14 ===
Oroma Elewa launched Pop’Africana, a landmark publication amplifying the cultures and styles of Africa to an international audience in 2009. The magazine offered a new vision of Africa and challenged aged clichés about the continent.

Pop’Africana has been celebrated for delivering a ‘rejuvenated image of Africa’. In an interview with Vogue Italia, Elewa elaborated on her intent in creating Pop’Africana, stating that she was inspired by ‘a vision of an Africa that shelters and respects individualism and for Africans, that the world's opinion of us is redirected.’

The magazine closed in 2014, with Elewa stating that the development of social media enabled individuals to tell their own stories, further stating that ‘being able to tell your own stories is more powerful than any magazine feature.'

=== Crushed Guava Leaves (2017-today) ===
Oroma Elewa’s first book, Crushed Guava Leaves, was published in 2017. The book draws on Elewa’s’ personal experiences and observations, compiling poems and stories that serve as ‘cultural snapshots primed for performance’. The stories were written to be adapted for stage, film, movement or sound - no imagery is included. In 2018, a collection of paintings by the artist interpreting some of the stories in the book was exhibited at Oof Books. The project as a whole has been described as a second creative project for the artist, in which she began to investigate the potential of ‘performance as a medium for cultural discourse’.

=== Area Babes & Ashawo Superstars (2019-today) ===
Oroma Elewa began the performance project ‘Area Babes and Ashawo Superstars’ on social media in 2019. For this work, the artist employs the ubiquitous meme format of modern-day digital discourse to put forward a critical dialogue on class, power, sexual politics and other matters concerning contemporary African womanhood and African feminism.

These characters are presented through both original and recreated stills from the golden age of Nollywood.

Area Babes and Ashawo Superstars brings a dimension to cultural discourse often considered taboo and engages the viewer in dialogues that exists outside normative contours of feminism; in particular economic agency and liberatory politics of sex; transactional and otherwise.

== Frida Kahlo Misattribution Controversy ==
Oroma Elewa’s poem ‘I am my own muse. I am the subject I know best. The subject I want to better.’ has been repeatedly erroneously attributed to Frida Kahlo by major art institutions and publications.

== Prizes ==
- Tosetti Value Award for photography, 2022.

== Exhibitions ==
- Corporate Ashawo, Solo Show, In Situ, Paris. March-April 2022.
- ARTissima 2022, Fiera Internazionale D'Arte Contemporanea, Turin. November, 2022.
- Currency: Photography Beyond Capture, 8th Triennal of Photography, Hamburg. September, 2022.
- Art Basel, Paris+, Paris. 2022.
- Geneva Art Fair 2022, In Situ, Paris. March, 2022.
- Togethering - Otobong Nkanga featuring Oroma Elewa, Bill Kouélany, Obi Okigbo, and Adeola Olagunju. Galerie In Situ, Paris. January - February 2022.
- Burned Out, Le18, Marrakech December 2019 - February 2020.
