= Ruby Onyinyechi Amanze =

Brooklyn-based Nigerian-British artist (born 1982)

- Born: 1982 (age 43–44); Nigeria
- Education: Temple University; Cranbrook Academy of Art
- Occupation: Visual artist
- Known for: Drawings
- Website: www.rubyamanze.com

Ruby Onyinyechi Amanze (Note: Amanze stylizes her name without capitals, i.e. ruby onyinyechi amanze.) (born 1982), is a Nigerian-born British-American artist noted for drawings and works on paper which focus on cultural hybridity or "post-colonial non-nationalism." In addition to being an artist, she has also worked as a teacher and curator. She lives in Brooklyn, New York.

== Early life and education ==
Amanze was born in Nigeria in 1982. She was raised in the United Kingdom, living there for 13 years before coming to the United States in 2004 when she moved to Philadelphia.

She received a B.F.A. degree summa cum laude from the Tyler School of Art at Philadelphia's Temple University in 2004. She received her M.F.A degree from Cranbrook Academy of Art, in Bloomfield Hills, Michigan.

== Work ==
Amanze's graphite, ink and pigment drawings, often combined with photo transfers, are populated by hybrid creatures that exist in multi-geographic spaces, floating in the white space of their paper substrate. She is greatly influenced by Nigerian artists and the Nigerian history of drawing. Her mixed-media drawings center on the concept of displacement and cultural hybridity.

Drawing has become her primary medium, with Amanze describing it as "constantly reinventing itself". Despite working with various mediums, her current pieces are all centered around drawing, a favorite medium since childhood. Only in college did she depart from drawing as her primary medium, instead majoring in the art of photography and textiles. Influenced by textile design, photography, print-making and architecture, her work conveys cultural displacement, anxiety, and identity, inspired by her “pieced-together memories” of Nigeria. These works explore a sense of displacement and existence between places, evoking feelings of homesickness and longing.

== Awards and residencies ==
Amanze earned a Fulbright Fellowship in 2012, and was a recipient of the Fulbright Scholars Award for Teaching/Research at the University of Nigeria, Nsukka (2013).

From 2015 to 2016 Amanze was an Opens Sessions participant at the Drawing Center, New York.

Amanze was an Artist-in-Residence at the Cooper Union School of Art in New York, NY in 2011, the Lower Manhattan Cultural Council from 2014 to 2015, the Fountainhead Residency in Miami, Florida in 2015, and the Queens Museum in Queens, New York, from 2016 to 2017.

== Selected exhibitions ==
Amanze has exhibited internationally. Her solo exhibitions include:

- there are even moonbeams we can unfold (2018) at Goodman Gallery, Cape Town, South Africa
- Salt Water (2015) at Goodman Gallery, Johannesburg, South Africa
- astroturf rooftop picnics (2015) at Morgan Lehman Gallery, New York, NY
- a story. in parts. (2015) at Tiwani Contemporary, London, UK
- The Armory Show Focus (2016) at Mariane Ibrahim Gallery, Seattle, WA
- STAR FISH (2017) at Smack Mellon, Brooklyn, NY

== Collections ==
Amanze's work is held in permanent collections including:

- Deutsche Bank, London, U.K.
- The Jewish Museum, New York, USA
- The Studio Museum in Harlem, New York, USA
- The Microsoft Collection
- Montblanc Cultural Foundation

== See also ==
- List of Nigerian women artists
