= Akenzua II =

Oba of Benin (1933–1978)

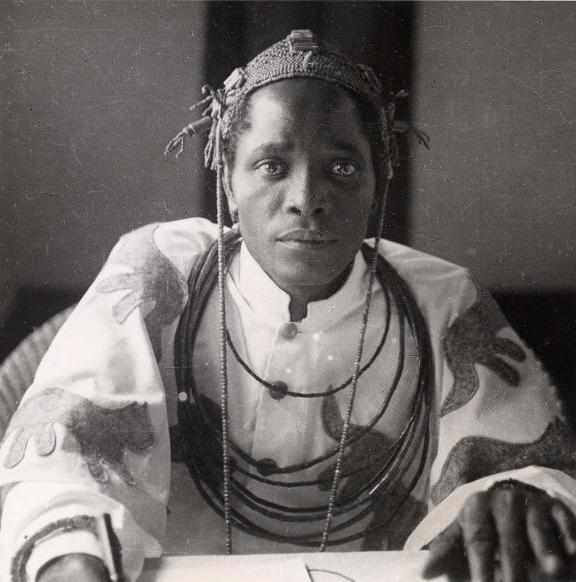
- Akenzua II, c. 1936

Oba of Benin
- Reign: 1933–1978
- Coronation: 5 April 1933
- Predecessor: Eweka II
- Successor: Erediauwa
- Born: Godfrey Edokparhogbuyunmwun Aguobasimwin Ovonramwen; 7 January 1899; Lagos, Nigeria
- Died: 11 June 1978 (aged 79)

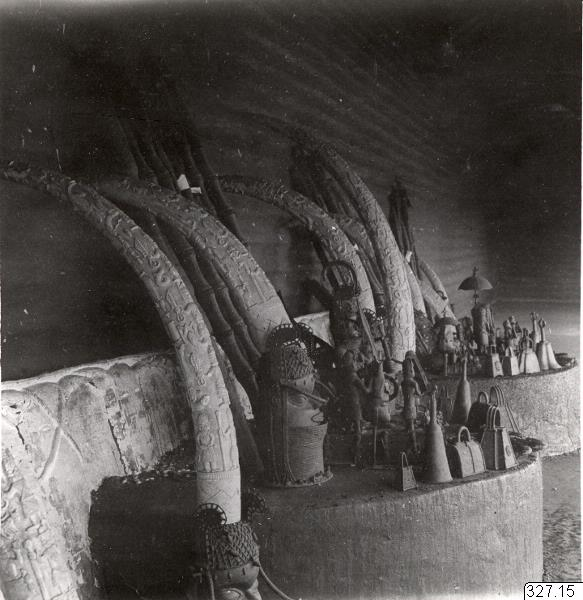
Akenzua II's ancestral altars, 1936

Ọmọ n'Ọba n'Ẹdo Uku Akpọlọkpọlọ, Akenzua II (7 January 1899 – 11 June 1978) was the thirty-seventh Oba of Benin reigning from 1933 until his death in 1978.

== Biography ==
Akenzua II attended Benin Government School from 1907, then King's College, Lagos, from 1918, passing the Junior Cambridge exam in 1921. Akenzua II was enthroned as Oba of Benin in April 1933 following the death of his father, Eweka II (r.1914 – 1933) in February that year. Oba Akenzua II was dedicated to the provision of western education for his subjects, the Edo people.

In 1936, he began the movement to return to Nigeria the Benin Bronzes looted from the royal compounds and ancestral altars in the punitive Benin Expedition of 1897. During his reign, only two of the 3,000 royal court bronzes were returned. However, two coral crowns and coral bead garment, thought to have belonged to Ovonramwen, were returned to him in the late 1930s by G.M. Miller a son of a member of the Benin expedition, who had loaned the pieces to the British Museum in 1935.

Oba Akenzua II died on 11 June 1978, when he was succeeded by his son, then Prince Solomon, who took on the title of Oba Erediauwa and duties as the traditional leader of the Edo people in Benin City, Nigeria.

== Family ==
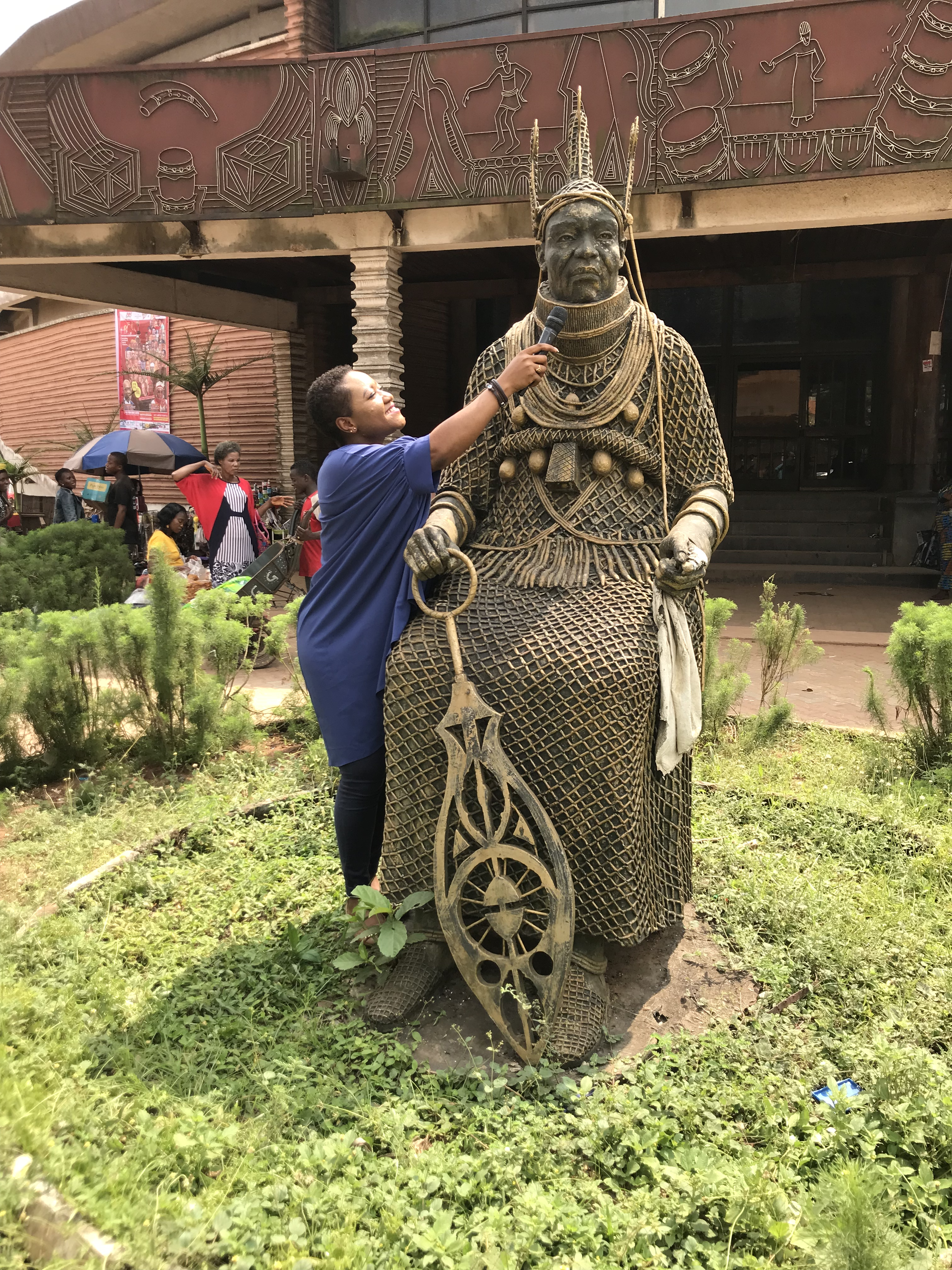
Statue of Akenzua II.

In 1923 his first son, Prince Solomon Aiseokhuoba Igbinoghodua Akenzua, was born. His chosen title was founded on the name Ere, relating to Oba Eresonye who is traditionally considered to be an incredibly wealthy Oba.

Akenzua's descendants include his daughter Princess Elizabeth Olowu, grandson Oba Ewuare II, great-grandson Crown Prince Ezelekhae Ewuare, granddaughter Peju Layiwola, and grandson Thompson Iyamu among others.

== Efforts to recover Benin royal objects ==
Akenzua II sought the return of royal objects removed from the Benin royal palace during the Benin Expedition of 1897. Among the objects he sought were two royal stools, one brass and one wooden, which were in the collection of the Ethnological Museum in Berlin.

In February 1935, Akenzua II raised the issue of the stools with Ivor Windsor-Clive, 2nd Earl of Plymouth, during Plymouth's visit to Benin. The stools were located in Berlin in 1936. The German ethnologist and art historian Eckart von Sydow assisted in identifying them.

The Berlin museum authorities refused to release the stools but offered to have replicas made. The replicas were commissioned in 1938 and arrived in Lagos on 5 January 1939. Akenzua II paid 1,582 Reichsmarks for the production of the replicas, while the original stools remained in Berlin.

A further restitution request was made on 17 June 1943 by English barrister Philip Guedalla on behalf of Oba Akenzua II. The British colonial office, citing the stools' high value, recommended postponing discussion until after the war. Renewed restitution efforts emerged in the early 21st century, including petitions to the British Parliament and Nigerian art exhibitions between 2010 and 2015.

Germany committed to returning illegitimately acquired items in 2019, and announced full restitution in March 2021. A Joint Declaration between Nigeria and Germany on 1 July 2022 committed to returning 1,130 Benin Bronzes, including the two royal stools, alongside efforts to prepare conservation facilities and expertise in Nigeria. The stools were returned to Nigeria in December 2022 as part of the restitution of Benin objects from Germany. German Foreign Minister Annalena Baerbock handed over 22 Benin Bronzes, including the royal stools, to Nigeria's Minister of Information and Culture, Lai Mohammed. On 18 May 2024, the National Commission for Museums and Monuments handed them over to Akenzua II's successor, Ewuare II, at the Royal Palace in Benin City.

== See also ==
- Akenzua family
- Princess Elizabeth Olowu
- Peju Layiwola
- Oba of Benin
- Ovia Idah

Akenzua II Oba of Benin Born: 1899 Died: 11 June 1978
Regnal titles
| Preceded by Eweka II | Oba of Benin; 1933–1978 | Succeeded by Erediauwa |
