= Haneefah Adam =

Nigerian visual artist

- Born: 1992 (age 33–34); Lagos, Nigeria
- Education: B.Sc. Physiology – University of Ilorin; M.Sc. Pharmacology and Drug Discovery – Coventry University
- Occupation: Visual artist
- Years active: 2015–present
- Known for: Food art, mixed media
- Notable work: Hijarbie
- Movement: Contemporary African art
- Awards: Winner, #TechMeetArtNG Exhibition (2016)

Haneefah Adam (born 1992) is a Nigerian visual artist, who is known for making art and designs using food items as her medium.

== Early life and education ==
Adam was born in Lagos to a Muslim family of 6 but grew up in Ilorin, who resides in Kwara State, Nigeria. She holds a bachelor's degree in Physiology from the University of IIorin and master's degree in pharmacology and drug discovery from Coventry University.

She was a fellow of The Leading African Women in Food Fellowship program (LAWFF)-2023.

== Career ==
Adam's works typically explore issues related to identity, culture, and representation, often mining from her experiences and interactions. She gained prominence in 2015, when she modified Barbie into "Hijarbie", a Barbie doll wearing a hijab. In 2016, she won the #TechMeetArtNG exhibition, which launched her career. Adam's work is inspired by shapes, colours and the histories found in different foods. Adam's skills are sewing, painting and food art.

She held her solo exhibition titled "Life long percussion" at Angels and Muse in Lagos. Her artistry "Her Story" was featured in Rele Art Gallery Lagos (2018),Impart Art Fair Lagos (2019) and also "A Changing Landscape the Female" featured at Van Der Plas Gallery, New York.

== See also ==
- List of Nigerian women artists
