= Patience Torlowei =

Nigerian fashion designer (born 1964)

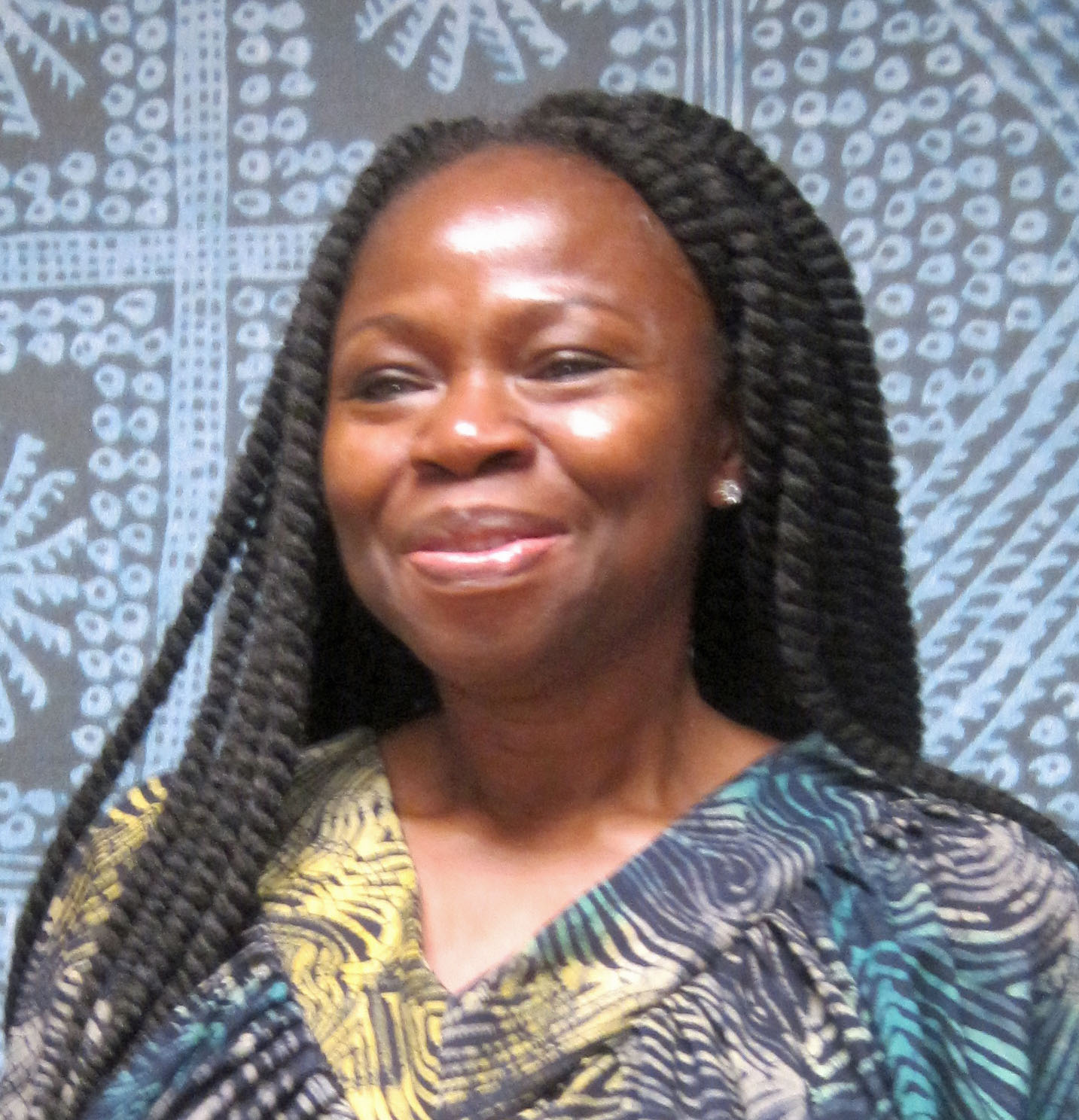
- Patience Torlowei in 2019
- Born: Patience Etipou Torlowei; 24 July 1964 (age 62); Enugu, Enugu State, Nigeria
- Known for: Textile Artist, Fashion Designer
- Website: patiencetorlowei.com

Patience Torlowei (born 24 July 1964) is a Nigerian fashion designer. She is the creator of the "Esther Dress", the first piece of couture ever to join the Smithsonian Institution's National Museum of African Art's permanent collection.

== Early life ==
Born in Enugu to Ijaw parents, Torlowei graduated from the Textile Arts and Technology faculty at the Yaba College of Technology. She moved to Belgium in 1989. As a fashion designer she has worked to create bridal clothes and lingerie as well as ready-to-wear attire. She founded her first fashion line, Patience Torlowei BVBA, in 2006.

== Career ==
A dress designed by Torlowei, Esther, is currently owned by the National Museum of African Art (NMAA) in Washington, D.C.; it is the first piece of haute couture to enter the museum collection. It depicts scenes of oil and diamond extraction and of war, and is made of a variety of materials including gold fabric. The piece had been previously featured in a fashion show at the museum in 2014. Torlowei was included in the 2019 show "I Am… Contemporary Women Artists of Africa" at the NMAA.

== See also ==
- Fashion in Nigeria
- Lingerie
- List of 20th-century women artists
