= Ekene Emeka Maduka =

Canadian-Nigerian contemporary artist

Ekene Emeka-Maduka (born 1996) is a Canadian-Nigerian contemporary artist, whose work draws on her Nigerian heritage and is known for its use of self-portraiture.

== Biography ==
Emeka-Maduka was born in Nigeria in 1996, to her interior designer mother and architect father. She was raised in Kano, Nigeria. She completed her Bachelor of Arts from University of Manitoba. Emeka-Maduka has said that her experience living in Nigeria has a major influence on her work. Her work includes themes of displacement and reconstructing identity, and she is often the subject of her paintings. Another recurring element of her work is the eye contact her subjects hold with the viewer of her paintings. She is based in Winnipeg, Canada.

== Selected exhibitions ==
=== Solo exhibitions ===
What is A Dream - Mirror Mirror Online Gallery (2020).

Walk Back Home - La Maison des Artistes Visuels Francophones, Winnipeg, Canada (2020).

1-54 Contemporary African Art Fair, London, UK (2020).

=== Group exhibitions ===
Gather - Flux Gallery, Winnipeg, Canada (2018).

Liminality in Infinite space - African Artists Foundation, Lagos (2020).

There, Here, Nowhere: Dwelling At The Edge Of The World - Kanbi Contemporary & The Koppel Project, curated by Adeola Arthur Ayoola, London (2020).

== Awards ==
- Dean Collection Grant - 2018.
