= Eweka II =

Oba of Benin (1914 AD–1933 AD)

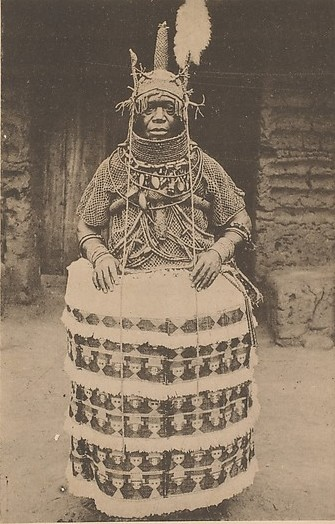
- Eweka II, c.1920

Oba of Benin
- Reign: 1914–1933
- Predecessor: Ovonramwen
- Successor: Akenzua II
- Born: Aiguobasinwin Ovonramwen
- Died: February 1933

Eweka II (Aiguobasinwin Ovonramwen; died February 1933) was the thirty-sixth Oba of Benin, reigning from 1914 to 1933.

He was the son of Ovonramwen (ruled 1888–1897), who was deposed by the British and exiled to Calabar following the British punitive expedition in Benin City in 1897. Aiguobasin Ovonramwen worked with the colonial government as a chief from 1902 onwards.

Ovonramwen died in January 1914, and Aiguobasinwin Ovonramwen was enthroned as the Oba of Benin on 24 July 1914. He took the name Eweka II after the 13th-century founder of the dynasty and the first Oba of Benin, Eweka I.

Eweka II rebuilt the royal palace, which had been destroyed and looted by the British in 1897. He also reestablished the traditional structure of the kingdom. The royal coral regalia of Ovonramwen seized by the British was returned. Eweka II also restored the craft guilds, commissioned objects to replace those looted by the British, and started the Benin Arts and Crafts School.

He died in February 1933 and his son Godfrey Edokparhogbuyunmwun Aguobasimwin Ovonramwen succeeded him as Oba Akenzua II on 5 April 1933.

One of his descendants is the former professional soccer player Sidney Deon Bruce Friede .

Eweka II Oba of Benin Born: Unknown Died: February 1933
Regnal titles
Preceded by Ovonramwen	Oba of Benin; 1914 – 1933	Succeeded by Akenzua II
