= Barbara Blackmun =

American scholar of African art history (1928–2018)

Barbara Winston Blackmun
- Born: June 29, 1928; Merced, California, U.S.
- Died: July 6, 2018 (aged 90); Lexington, Kentucky, U.S.
- Education: UCLA (BFA, 1949); Arizona State University (MA, 1971); UCLA (PhD, 1984)
- Occupations: Art historian, professor, museum director
- Awards: National Endowment for the Humanities grant

Barbara Winston Blackmun (June 29, 1928 – July 6, 2018) was an American art historian, professor, and museum director. Blackmun was an expert on Beninese art. She taught art at the San Diego Mesa College from 1971 to 2010, where she was made an emerita professor.

== Early life and education ==
Barbara Marian Winston was born in Merced, California on June 29, 1928. She was the daughter of Col. Walter L. Winston and Marian (née Warner) Winston.

Winston attended the University of California at Los Angeles (UCLA), graduating with a bachelors of fine arts in 1949. Later, she attended Arizona State University where she obtained a masters of art in art history. Winston also obtained a PhD in African art from UCLA in 1984.

== Career ==
Winston became a school teacher in Trona, California.

In 1964, the family moved to Malawi, where her husband helped set up the Malawi Polytechnic College. Winston taught art and English at the polytechnic as well as the University of Malawi and helped develop high school art curricula.

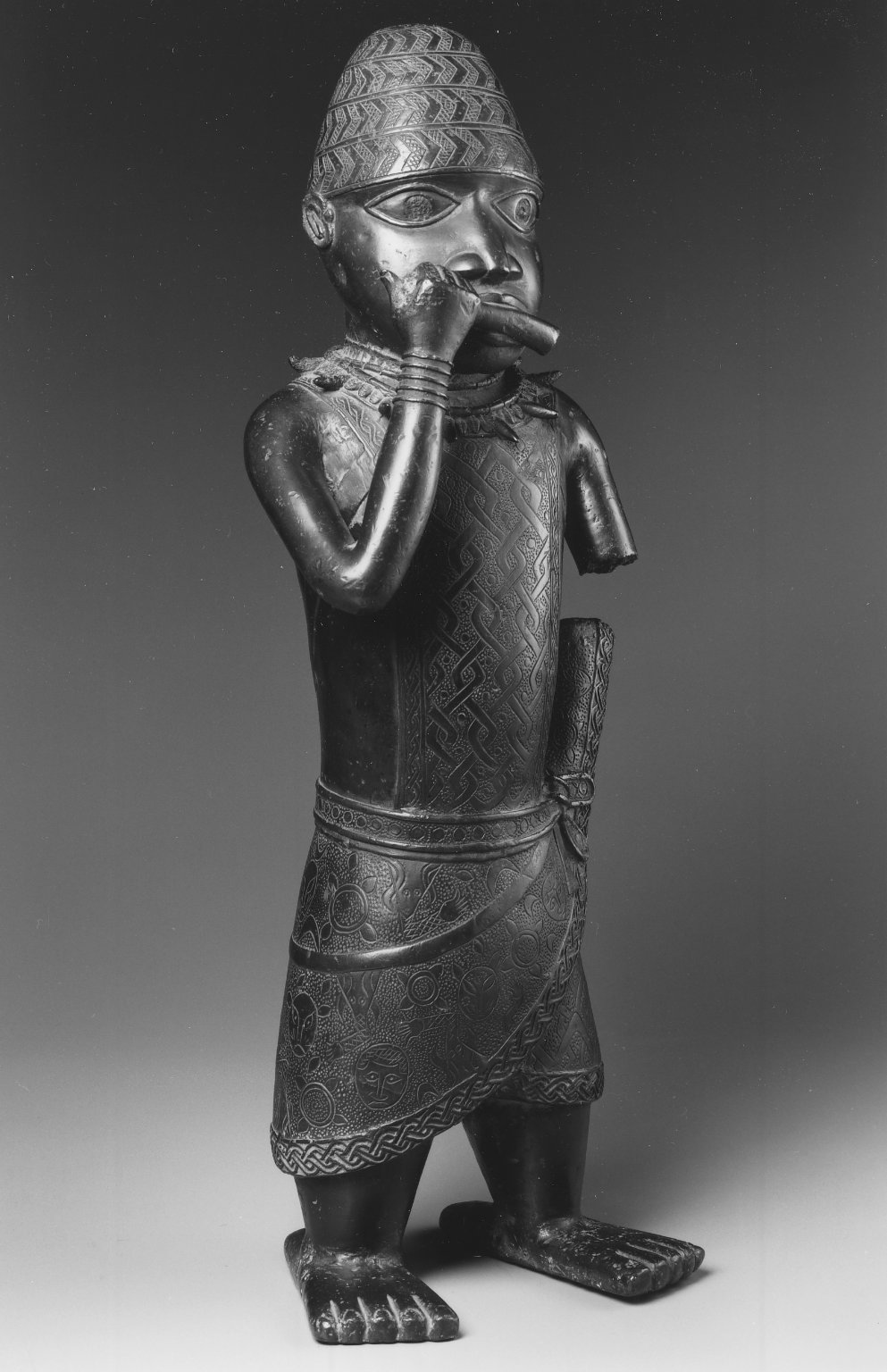
Example of Benin art

In 1971, Winston got a job as a lecturer at San Diego Mesa College. She taught at the college until 2010.

In the summers of 1978 and 1979, she worked at the Hunterian Museum in Glasgow, Scotland. In 1981 to 1982, she visited Benin to study its art. Winston's photo slides of Nigerian art are held in the Barbara Blackmun Collection at the Smithsonian Institution.

== Personal life and death ==
Winston married Rupert Blackman in 1951, a professor of industrial arts. The couple had three children. He predeceased her in 2008.

Blackmun died on July 6, 2018. She was 90. Blackmun was buried in Fort Rosecrans National Cemetery.

== Works ==
- Blackmun, B. W. (1997). Continuity and change: the ivories of Ovonramwen and Eweka II. African Arts, 30, 68–79.
- Blackmun, B. W. (1991). Who commissioned the Queen Mother Tusks? A problem in the chronology of Benin ivories. African Arts, 24(2), 54.
- Blackmun, Barbara W. (1988). "From Trader to Priest in Two Hundred Years: The Transformation of a Foreign Figure on Benin Ivories". Art Journal. 47 (2): 128–138. doi:10.1080/00043249.1988.10792405. ISSN 0004-3249.
- Blackmun, Barbara Winston. “Icons and Emblems in Ivory: An Altar Tusk from the Palace of Old Benin.” Art Institute of Chicago Museum Studies 23, no. 2 (1997): 149–98.
