= Benin Expedition of 1897 =

British invasion of the Kingdom of Benin

- Part of the Scramble for Africa
Date	9–18 February 1897
Location	Benin City, Benin Empire
Result	British victory

Belligerents
British Empire: Niger Coast Protectorate	Benin Empire

Commanders and leaders
(United Kingdom) Harry Rawson	(Benin Empire) Ovonramwen (Benin Empire) Asoro N' lyokuo (Benin Empire) Ologbosere

Strength
1,200	Unknown

Casualties and losses
8	Not counted; very high

The Benin Expedition of 1897 was the conquest of the Kingdom of Benin by British forces that led to the annexation of Benin into colonial Nigeria.

In late December 1896, a party of 250 people led by James Phillips of the Niger Coast Protectorate set off to Benin City with the stated purpose of discussing trade relations with their leader, Ovonramwen, but Phillips did not wait for his approval before crossing into Benin. The party was attacked by Benin forces on 4 January with almost everyone killed or captured. In response, the British invaded Benin on 9 February with 1,200 men under the command Sir Harry Rawson. Rawson's troops captured Benin City with minimal losses, while an unknown number of Benin people were killed. African porters who had been captured in the January attack and enslaved were freed. The expedition resulted in the looting of cultural artefacts, including the Benin Bronzes, the exile of Ovonramwen, and the annexation of Benin into the Niger Coast Protectorate.

The Benin Bronzes, which are currently mostly held by the British Museum, are subject to an ongoing movement to repatriate them and have become a symbol of an incomplete decolonisation of Africa.

== Background ==
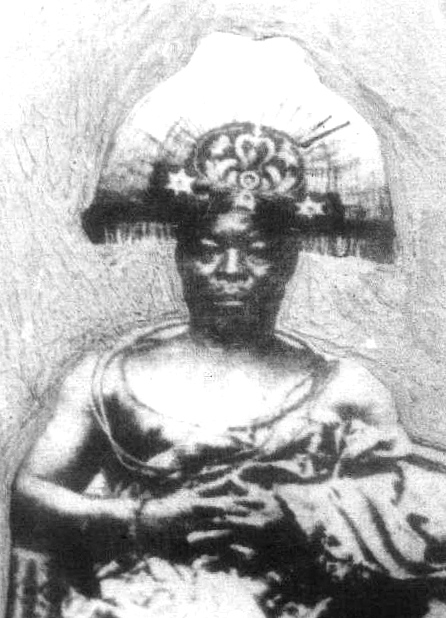
Ovonramwen, Oba of Benin

At the end of the 19th century, the Kingdom of Benin had retained its independence during the Scramble for Africa, and the Oba of Benin exercised a monopoly over trade in Benin's territories which the Royal Niger Company considered a threat. In 1892, Deputy Commissioner and Vice-Consul Captain Henry Lionel Galway (1859–1949) tried to negotiate a trade agreement with Oba Ovọnramwẹn Nọgbaisi (1888–1914) to allow for the free passage of goods through his territory and the development of the palm oil industry. Captain Gallwey (as his name was then spelled) pushed for British interests in the region, especially of the palm oil industry, by attempting to negotiate a free trade agreement with the Oba at the time. Later, Ralph Moor urged the Foreign Office to use whatever means to secure the signed treaty, up to and including force. Gallwey signed the treaty with the Oba and his chiefs which gave Britain legal justification for exerting greater influence in the region. The Oba was hesitant to sign the treaty. After the British consul Richard Burton visited Benin in 1862 he described it a place of "gratuitous barbarity which stinks of death", a narrative which was publicized in Britain and increased pressure for the territory's incorporation into the British Empire. The treaty itself does not explicitly mention anything about the "bloody customs" that Burton had written about, and instead includes a vague clause about ensuring "the general progress of civilization". While the treaty granted free trade to British merchants operating in the Kingdom of Benin, the Oba persisted in requiring customs duties. Since Major (later Sir) Claude Maxwell Macdonald, the Consul General of the Oil River Protectorate authorities considered the treaty legal and binding, he deemed the Oba's requirements a violation of the accord and thus a hostile act.

Some historians have suggested that humanitarian motivations were driving British foreign policy in the region. Others, such as Philip Igbafe, consider that the annexation of Benin was driven largely by economic designs. The treaty itself did not mention any goal that removed the "bloody customs" that Burton had written about.

In 1894, after the capture of Ebrohimi, the trading town of the chief Nana Olomu (the leading Itsekiri trader in the Benin River District) by a combined Royal Navy and Niger Coast Protectorate force, the Kingdom of Benin increased the military presence on its own southern borders. These developments combined with the Colonial Office's refusal to grant approval for an invasion of Benin City scuttled an expedition the Protectorate had planned for early 1895. Even so, between September 1895 and mid-1896 three attempts were made by the Protectorate to enforce the Gallwey Treaty of 1892: firstly by Major P. Copland-Crawford, Vice-Consul of the Benin District; secondly by Ralph Frederick Locke, the Vice-Consul Assistant; and thirdly by Captain Arthur Maling, Commandant of the Niger Coast Protectorate Force detachment based in Sapele.

In March 1896, following price fixing and refusals by Itsekiri middle men to pay the required tributes, the Oba of Benin ordered a cessation of the supply of oil palm produce to them. The trade embargo brought trade in the Benin River region to a standstill, and the British merchants in the region appealed to the Protectorate's Consul-General to "open up" Benin territories and to send the Oba (whom they claimed was an obstruction to their trading activities) into exile. In October 1896 the Acting Consul-General, James Robert Phillips, visited the Benin River District and met with the agents and traders, who convinced him that "there is a future on the Benin River if Benin territories were opened".

== January 1897 ==
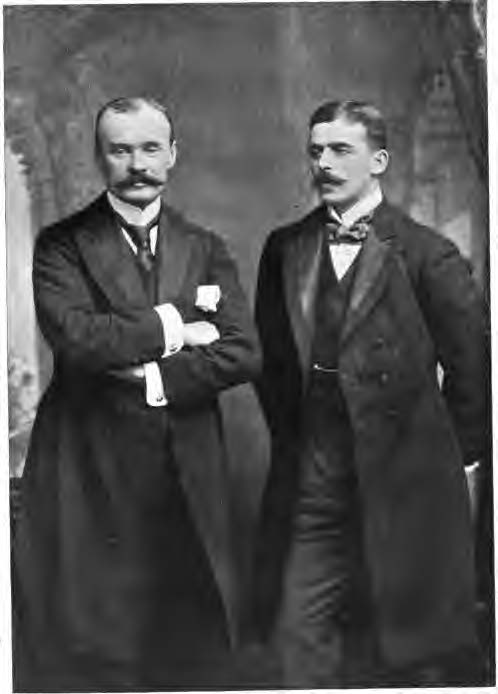
Boisragon and Locke, the two Britons who survived the attack

In November 1896, Phillips, the Vice Consul of a trading post on the African coast, planned to meet with the Oba in Benin City regarding trade relations between Benin and British officials. He formally asked his superiors in London for permission to visit Benin City, stating that the costs of such an embassy could be recouped through trade, including ivory. In late December 1896, before receiving a reply or approval, Phillips embarked on an expedition comprising about 250 people. (Note: James Robert Phillips, Acting Consul-General, Niger Coast Protectorate; Maj. Copland Crawford, Vice-Consul of the Benin and Warri districts; Alan Boisragon, Commandant of the Constabulary of the Niger Coast Protectorate; Cap. Malling, Niger Coast Protectorate force officer; Mr. Elliot, Medical Officer for Sapele and Benin districts; Ralph Locke, District Commissioner of Warri; Mr. Kenneth Campbell, District Commissioner at Sapele; Mr Gordon, trader and member of the Africa Association; Mr. Swainson, trader of Mr. Pinnock's firm; Mr Powis, agent for Millers Brothers palm oil company at Old Calabar; Mr. Lyon, Assistant District Commissioner at Sapele (waited in Gwatto); Mr. Baddoo (of Accra, Gold Coast), Consul-General's Chief Clerk and Photographer; Mr. Jumbo, Consul-General's orderly and civil policeman; Mr. Towey, a local interpreter; Mr. Herbert Clarke, a local interpreter; Mr. Basilli, a local Benin guide; Jim, a Kru manservant of Boisragon; 180 Jakri porters to carry, food, trade goods, presents, cameras, and tents; 60 Kru labourers)

Phillips sent a message to the Oba stating that his mission was to discuss trade and peaceful relations and requesting admission to the territory. He also sent an envoy ahead bearing gifts. At the time, the Oba was celebrating the Igue festival, and he sent word that he did not wish to receive the British delegation during this period, indicating that he would send word later when he was ready to meet with Phillips and one Jakri chief. The Oba requested that the party wait about a month, but Phillips continued towards the capital despite warnings from Itsekiri intermediaries that Benin forces were assembling. The proposed visit produced a sharp division within the Oba's council, with the Oba ordering his chiefs not to attack the party and instructing them to allow them to approach so that its intentions could be determined.

On 4 January 1897, as the party approached Benin City, the Oba continued trying to restrain the war party after the visitors' baggage had been inspected and found not to contain firearms. Phillips and his party were ultimately attacked by Benin forces near Ugbine village close to Gwatto. Most of the British officials and many African porters were killed. Two British members of Phillips' expedition were seriously wounded during the attack but survived: Captain Alan Maxwell Boisragon and Ralph Locke. The Edo attackers captured over 100 Itsekiri porters hired by the British, who were taken back to Benin.

Within the week, news of the incident reached London. As a result of this attack, the Foreign Office authorized military action, leading to what the British called a "punitive expedition". British officials presented the expedition as both a response to the killings and as an intervention against practices in the kingdom. Historian Philip Igbafe has noted that the humanitarian and punitive justifications given by Moor differed from the economic arguments for military action promoted by members of the Protectorate administration in the months and years before February 1897.

== February 1897 ==
Admiral Sir Harry Rawson

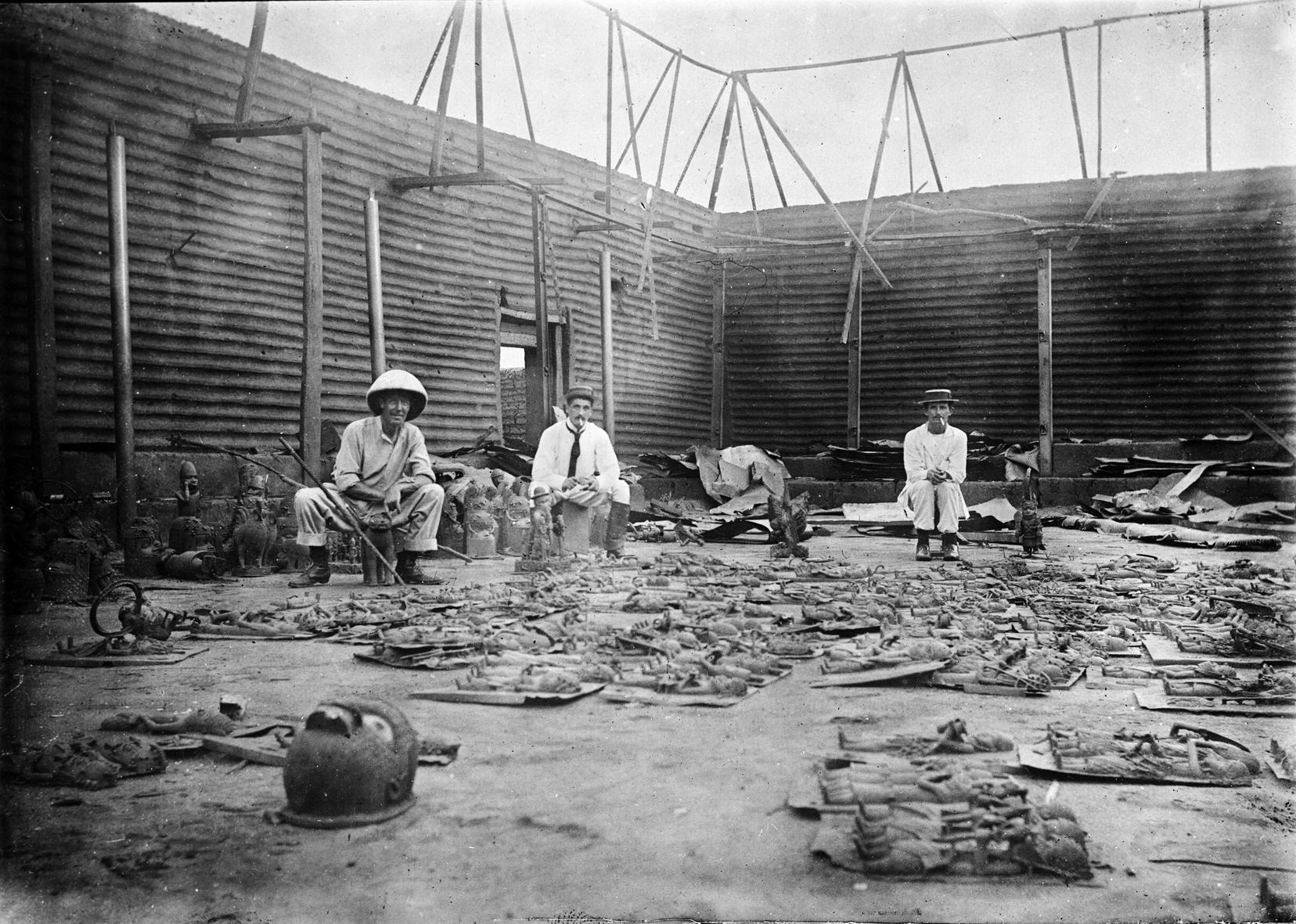
A photograph of the interior of Oba's compound being burnt during the punitive expedition, with bronze plaques in the foreground and three soldiers from the punitive force in the background

On 12 January 1897, Rear-Admiral Harry Rawson, commander of the Royal Navy forces at the Cape of Good Hope and West Coast of Africa Station, was appointed by the Admiralty to lead a force to invade the Kingdom of Benin and capture the Benin Oba. The British named the operation the "Benin Punitive Expedition".

On 9 February 1897, the invasion of the Kingdom of Benin began. The British invasion force of about 1,200 Royal Marines, sailors and Niger Coast Protectorate Forces was organised into three columns: the 'Sapoba', 'Gwato' and 'Main' columns. Flotillas of warships (including HMS Philomel and Phoebe) and gunboats approached Benin City from the east and west. The 'Sapoba' and 'Main' columns reached Benin City after ten days of fighting. The 'Gwato' column (under Captain Gallwey) took the same route as that taken by the previous mission and came on the scene of the massacre, finding headless bodies of the victims.

The capital was captured on 18 February. British forces used rockets during the final stage of the advance before the remaining Benin defenders withdrew. Ovonramwen remained in the palace until British troops approached closely and a rocket landed within one of the palace courtyards.

Elspeth Huxley spent some time researching in Benin in 1954, and wrote:

... to hear an account of the Benin massacre of 1897 and its sequel from one who had taken part. It is a story that still has power to amaze and horrify, as well as to remind us that the British had motives for pushing into Africa other than the intention to exploit the natives and glorify themselves. Here, for instance, are some extracts from the diary of a surgeon who took part in the expedition.:—

As we neared Benin City we passed several human sacrifices, live women slaves gagged and pegged on their backs to the ground, the abdominal wall being cut in the form of a cross, and the uninjured gut hanging out. These poor women were allowed to die like this in the sun. Men slaves, with their hands tied at the back and feet lashed together, also gagged, were lying about. As we neared the city, sacrificed human beings were lying in the path and bush—even in the king's compound the sight and stench of them was awful. Dead and mutilated bodies were everywhere – by God! May I never see such sights again! ...

Herbert Walker, a soldier serving in the punitive expedition, believed that the human sacrifices he saw were an attempt by Benin City residents to appease the Gods as they tried to defend themselves from the expedition.

According to professor of African studies, Robin Law, the issue of human sacrifices is extremely sensitive and prone to bias. Law suggests that the reported extent of the practice in Benin was exaggerated by the British in order to establish the need for military intervention.

Eight members of the punitive force were recorded as being killed in action during the Benin Expedition; the number of military and civilian casualties amongst the Benin people was not estimated but is thought to have been very high.

The Benin Expedition was described as such:

In twenty-nine days a force of 1,200 men, coming from three places between 3000 and 4500 m. from the Benin river, was landed, organized, equipped and provided with transport. Five days later the city of Benin was taken, and in twelve days more the men were re-embarked, and the ships coaled and ready for any further service.

All-in-all, around 5,000 men were mobilised for the expedition, which took place over three weeks.

The expedition publicised the freeing of about 100 Africans carriers who been enslaved by the Oba after the attack.

== Aftermath ==
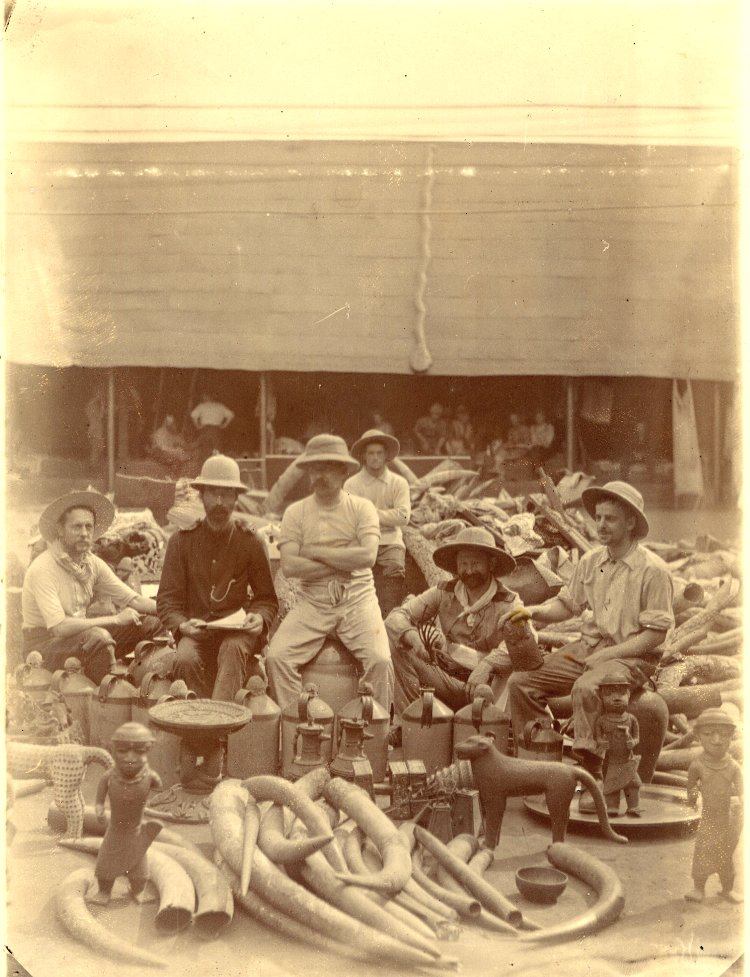
Members of the expedition surrounded by objects from the royal palace

After the capture of Benin City, houses, sacred sites, ceremonial buildings and palaces of many high-ranking chiefs were looted and many buildings were burned down, including the Palace building itself on Sunday 21 February. There was evidence of previous human sacrifice found by members of the expedition, with journalists from Reuters and the Illustrated London News reporting that the town 'reeked of human blood.'

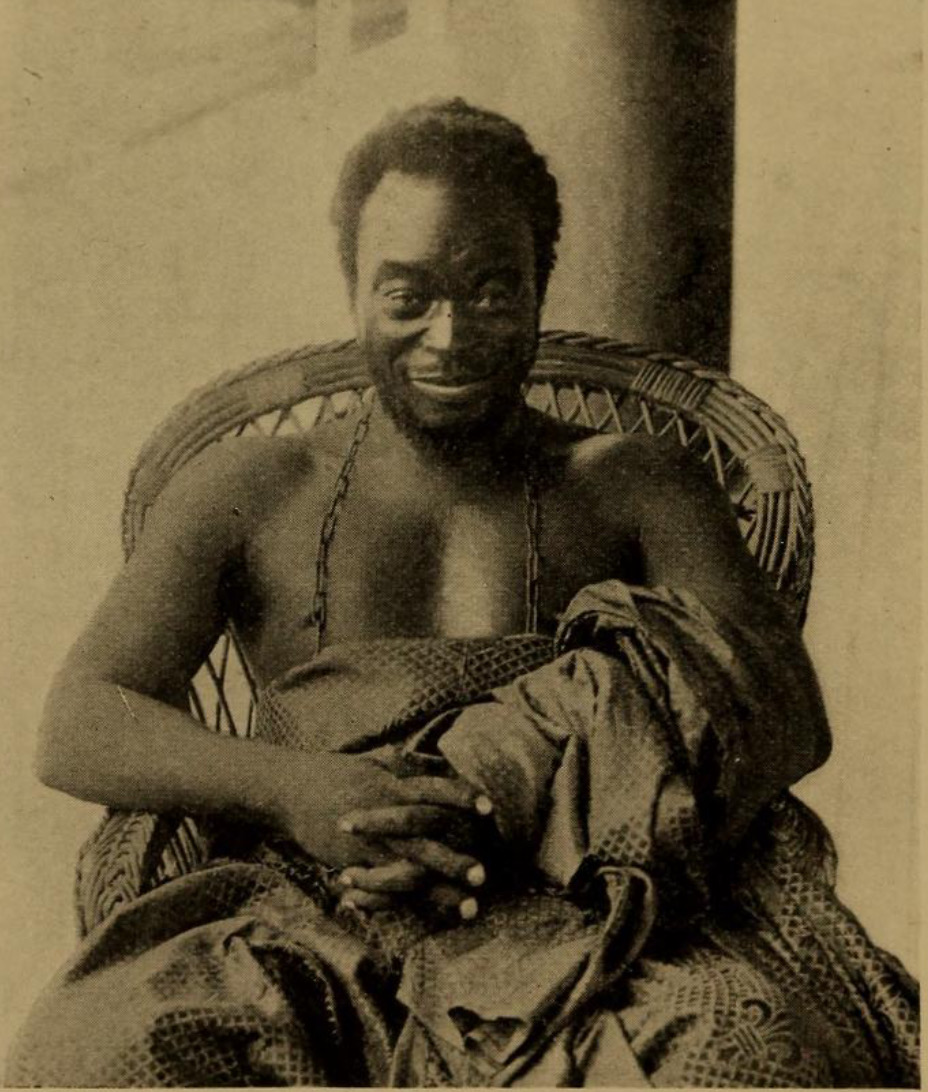
Ovonramwen, photographed by Jonathan Adagogo Green on board the Niger Coast Protectorate steam yacht, Ivy, while the Oba was on his way to exile in 1897

The Oba was eventually captured by the British consul-general, Ralph Moor. He was deposed and exiled, with two of his eighty wives, to Calabar. A British Resident was appointed, and six chiefs were hanged in Benin City's marketplace.

Most of the plunder from the city was retained by the expedition with some 2,500 (official figures) religious artefacts, Benin visual history, mnemonics and artworks being sent to Britain. They include over a thousand metal plaques and sculptures collectively known as the Benin Bronzes. The Admiralty confiscated and auctioned off the war booty to defray the costs of the expedition.

About 40% of the art was accessioned to the British Museum, while other works were given to individual members of the armed forces as spoils of war, and the remainder was sold at auction by the Admiralty to pay for the expedition as early as May 1897 (Stevens Auction Rooms, 38 King Street, London, 25 May 1897; followed by several sales by the ethnographic dealer William Downing Webster, Bicester, between 1898 and 1900). Most of the Benin Bronzes sold at auction were purchased by museums, mainly in Germany. The dispersal of Benin artworks to museums around the world catalysed the beginnings of a long and slow European reassessment of the value of West African art. The Benin art was copied and the style integrated into the art of many European artists and thus had a strong influence on the early formation of modernism in Europe.

The British occupied Benin, which was absorbed into the British Niger Coast Protectorate and eventually into British colonial Nigeria. A general emancipation of slaves followed in the wake of British occupation, and with it came an end to human sacrifice. However, the British instituted a system of drafting locals to work as forced labourers in often poor conditions that were not much better than had been during the previous Benin Empire.

== Controversy ==
There has been much debate of why James Phillips set out on the mission to Benin without much weaponry. Some have argued he was going on a peaceful mission. Such commentators argue that the message from the Oba that his festival would not permit him to receive European visitors touched the humanitarian side of Phillips's character because of an assumption that the festival included human sacrifice. According to Igbafe, this does not explain why Phillips set out before he had received a reply from the Foreign Office to his request where he stated that:

F.O. 2/I02, Phillips to F.O. no. 105 of i6 Nov 1896. 'there is nothing in the shape of a standing army. ... and the inhabitants appear to be if not a peace-loving at any rate a most unwarlike people whose only exploits during many generations had been an occasional quarrel with their neighbours about trade or slave raiding and it appears at least improbable that they have any arms to speak of except the usual number of trade guns... When Captain Gallwey visited the city the only canon he saw were half a dozen old Portuguese guns. They were lying on the grass unmounted'. Compare this with the opinion of his immediate predecessor, Ralph Moor, who was convinced that 'the people in all the villages are no doubt possessed of arms' (F.O. 2/84, Moor to F.O. no. 39 of I2 Sept. 1895).

Igbafe also points to Phillips' November 1896 advocacy of military force regarding Benin, arguing that this is inconsistent with the perception of Phillips as a man of peace in January 1897. Igbafe posits that Phillips was going on a reconnaissance mission and that Phillips' haste to Benin can be explained by a belief that nothing bad would happen to him or his party.

Phillips's journey has been described by Mona Zutshi Opubor as a period of lull before the outbreak of a violent storm which had been gathering for years with the pressure of traders, consuls and a few visits of armed Europeans to Benin. The suspicion among the Oba of Benin and his chiefs, therefore, only deepened with Phillips's mission. The previous deportations of the chiefs Jaja of Opobo in 1887 and Nana Olomu in 1894 in neighboring British controlled territories may have made Benin anxious about the safety of their Oba and the true intentions of the British. According to Igbafe, evidence at the Oba's trial in September 1897 showed that the people of Benin did not believe that Phillips' party had peaceful intentions; since the capture of Nana Olomu, there had been a long expectation of war in Benin.

== Movement for repatriation of objects taken as war booty ==
In 2017, a cockerel statue or okukor looted during the 1897 Benin Expedition was removed from the hall of Jesus College, Cambridge, following protests by students of the university. Jesus College's student union passed a motion declaring that the sculpture should be returned. A spokesperson from the university stated that "Jesus College acknowledges the contribution made by students in raising the important but complex question of the rightful location of its Benin bronze, in response to which it has removed the okukor from its hall" and that the university is willing "to discuss and determine the best future for the okukor, including the question of repatriation. On 27 October 2021, the okukor was received by Nigeria's National Commission for Museums and Monuments (NCMM) in a Benin Bronze Restitution Ceremony held and livestreamed by Jesus College.

In March 2021, the University of Aberdeen became the first institution to agree to the full repatriation of a Benin Bronze from a museum. It handed back a bronze sculpture, depicting the head of an Oba, to the NCMM on 28 October 2021. It had been purchased by the university at an auction in 1957 and was identified, much later, as a Benin bronze during a collections review.

In April 2025, the Museum of Fine Arts, Boston, announced it would close a gallery of historic bronzes from the Kingdom of Benin, some of which were looted in 1897. Museum leadership stated they would return 29 of the bronzes to their donor, Robert Owen Lehman, while retaining five bronzes owned by the museum for later display in its Art of Africa Gallery. When the NCMM demanded the return of the pieces in 2012, that request was rebuffed.

Current policy of the Nigerian government is for all repatriated Benin Bronzes to be turned over to the ownership of Ewuare II, the current Oba of Benin and a direct descendant of the ruler of Benin overthrown by the British in 1897. Campaigners for slavery reparations described this as unjust and misguided, arguing that the Oba's ancestors profited from the slave trade. They note that the Kingdom of Benin was a slave trading state into the late 19th century at the time of the 1897 overthrow and argue that the Bronzes were created with the wealth acquired from the slave trade.

== Cultural representations ==
- Plays relating to the events include Ovonramwen N' Ogbaisi, written by Ola Rotimi (1971); and The Trials of Oba Ovonramwen, written by Ahmed Yerima (1997);
- Visual artists' responses include Tony Phillips' series of prints titled History of the Benin Bronzes (1984); Kerry James Marshall's graphic novel titled Rythm Mastr; and Peju Layiwola's travelling exhibition and edited book called Benin1897.com: Art and the Restitution Question.
- Films covering aspects of the expedition include The Mask (1979), starring Eddie Ugbomah; and Invasion 1897 (2014), directed by Lancelot Oduwa Imasuen.

== See also ==
- Akure–Benin War
- History of Nigeria
- Izevbokun Oshodin
- Benin Bronzes
