= Matthew S =

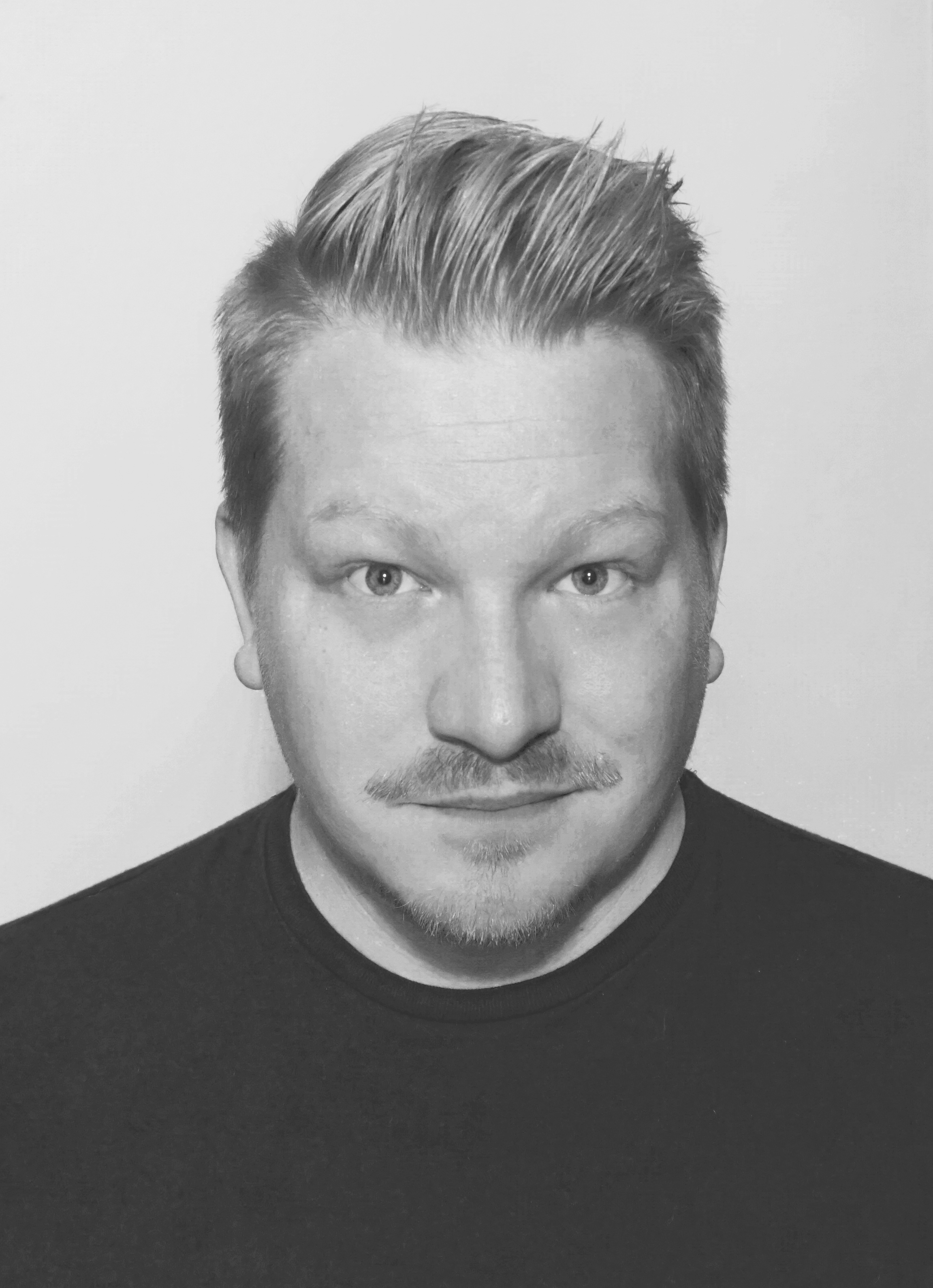
- Matthew S in 2018

Background information
- Born: Matteo Scapin; 4 February 1989 (age 37); Thiene, Italy
- Genres: Electronica; ambient; house
- Occupations: Producer; performer; musician; DJ
- Instruments: Synthesizer; drum machine; personal computer; MIDI controller
- Years active: 2009–present
- Labels: Smilax; INRI / Metatron
- Website: matthewess.com

Matthew S is the pseudonym of Matteo Scapin, an Italian electronic music producer, musician and composer. He is known for his diverse production style, which is influenced primarily by electronic music and ambient music, but also elements of tech house.

== Biography ==
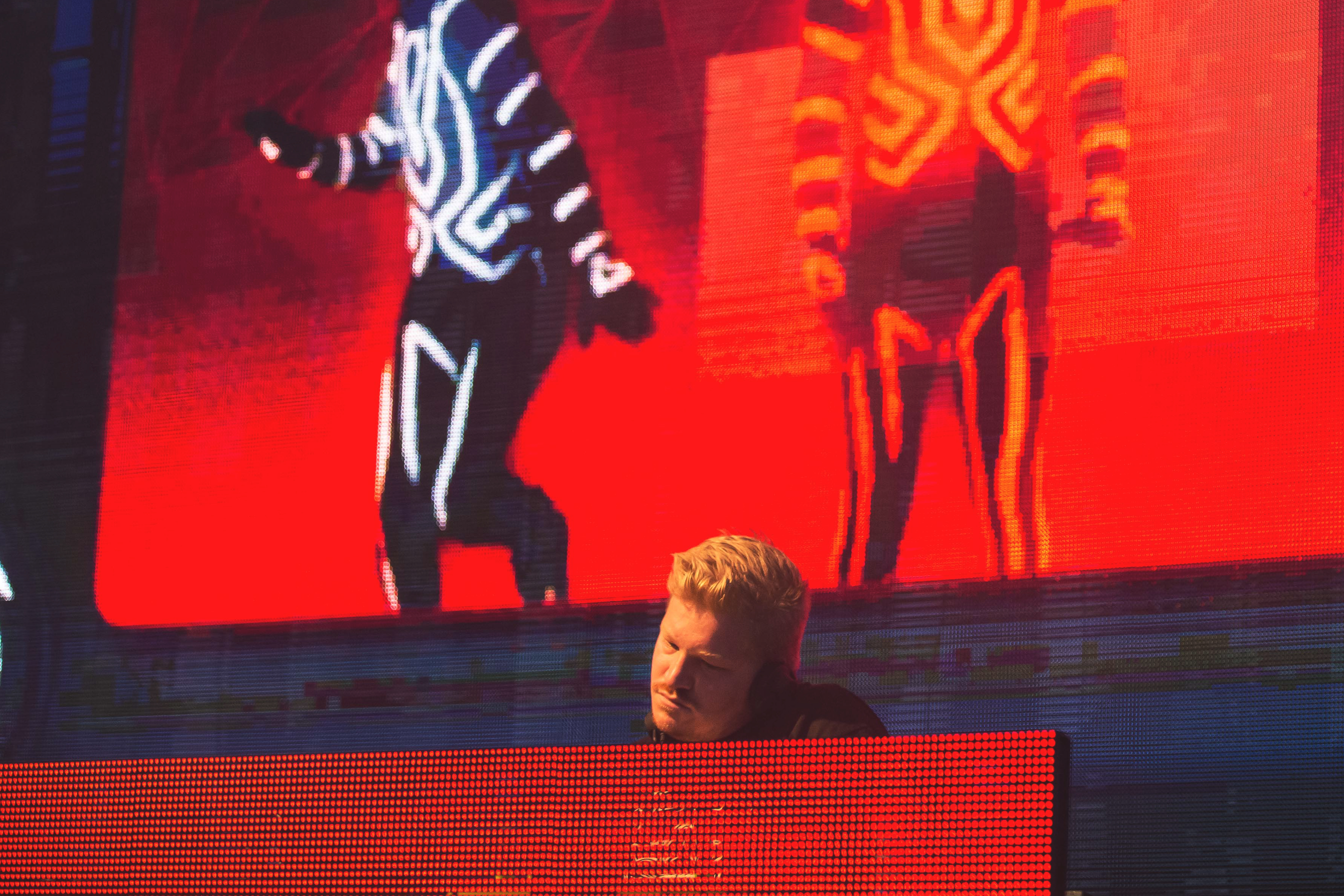
Matthew S performing at MTV Digital Days 2015

Matthew S began his career in 2009 with the release of his first EP Reiz Musik 014 and after the release of the EP, he then decided to focus on electronic music, in order to use its eclectic features; he believed that electronic music was very versatile, contaminated and suggestive. He teaches a DJ Ableton Live music sequencing software course at the Istituto Musicale Veneto di Thiene (Veneto City of Music) and also teaches at Pantarhei in Vicenza. He collaborated as sound designer with Gruppo L'Espresso and Gruppo Magnolia, a TV production society leader in creating new entertainment formats that include different genres.

In 2015, Matthew S produced his first album Call Me by Your Name with fashion designer Von Felthen. He was invited to perform at the MTV Digital Days festival at Royal Villa of Monza in Monza on 11 September 2015, and won "Best New Generation Electro" by MTV New Generation (MTV Italy) He also received the prize "Città di Thiene 2015".

In 2016, he signed a contract for exclusive publishing with Il Nuovo Rumore Italiano (INRI) / Metatron, a well-known independent publisher in Italy which gives the producer access to his own Italian and international network. and he published the songs "Maneki Neko" and the single "Inside" The music video for his single "Inside" was heavily played from September to October on MTV Music (Italy) . After publishing "Inside", He created a remix of the song "Tokai" by Anti Anti featuring Samuel Umberto Romano from Subsonica and Veronica. In the same year, he released a remix of Lemandorle's "Le Ragazze". He became an artist ambassador for Arturia, one of the main brands in the world for music’s hardware and software.

In 2017, Matthew S released the single "Disco Ball" and in the following year he released the album First. The voices of Leiner Riflessi (ex-Dear Jack’s front man and contestant from series 8 of the Italian X Factor) and IVYE (Landlord’s voice from series 9 of X Factor) show off respectively "Touch" that has house and underground sounds, and "Don’t bring me down" with sounds closer to electronic dance music. "Island", one of the opening tracks of First, presents a featuring with Tullia, a young songwriter from Vicenza. The single "Touch" appeared on MTV Italy's Dance Top 10 throughout the summer. It also received airplay on the radio.

In November of the same year, Matthew S collaborated with some well known music producers Dirty Freek, Erick Morello and DJ P Tee Money in creating a remix album of the song "When I Came Up" by Bon Villan, a Canadian band

In 2019, Matthew S released the single "Waves on The Moon", shifting focus away from the limitations of modern music to create an atmospheric track, and in the following months he released the single "Bounce", a trial of electronic and classical music in collaboration with Cucina Sonora.

On 27 March 2020, he released "Daydream" (for INRI Classic), a single in collaboration with the accordionist Pietro Roffi and the pianist Gian Marco Castro written during the coronavirus quarantine.

In 2021, Matthew S released the Single "Marea" in collaboration with Kathy Palma from Guatemala, in the following year released the EP "Rebirth", classical sounds, featuring Pablo Ortega on the cello, meet electronic sounds, and analog instruments are mixed with electrophones.

On 3 February 2023, he release "No Goodbye", this song represents a perfect synthesis of Matthew S 's artistic philosophy. In this case, the blending of electronic and ambient music was particularly successful, giving life to a track that invites the listener to travel to a dreamlike dimension and reflect on their own emotions.

His 2024 EP Solar Cycle was generally considered a career-making effort and a new phase in his development as an artist and is noted for its capacity to produce immersive and textured soundscapes. The music outlet Soundwall called it "a turning point" in his career.

Later that year, he collaborated with actor and musician Gary Dourdan on a single, titled Seedless Grapes, which was made up of soulful vocals and electronic production and appeared in DJ Mag Italia.

On 26 September 2025, he published the single My Immaculate Dream in collaboration with Italian actor, writer and DJ Corrado Fortuna, known in the artistic scene as Fortuna, a track which was conceived as a totally online production, which combines cinematic electronic textures with light and insistent percussion.

== Discography ==
=== Studio albums ===
Title	Information
Call Me by Your Name (with Von Felthen)	Released: 5 June 2015; Label: Smilax Publishing SRL; Formats: Digital download
First	Released: 15 June 2018; Label: INRI; Formats: Digital download

=== Singles ===
Title	Year	Album
"This"	2015	Non-album singles
"Maneki Neko"	2016	Non-album singles
"Inside"	2016	First
"Disco Ball"	2017	First
"Touch" (featuring Leiner)	2018	First
Waves on the Moon	2019	
Bounce (featuring Cucina Sonora)	2019	
Daydream	2020	
Marea (Featuring Kathy Palma)	2021	
Time	2021	
Rebirth (EP)	2022	
Thinking of Lanzarote (Featuring Jacopo Croci)	2022	
No Goodbye	2023	

== Awards and nominations ==
Year	Awards	Category	Recipient	Outcome	Ref.
2015	MTV New Generation	Best New Generation Electro	Matthew S	Won	
2015	Città di Thiene	Premio Thiene	Matthew S	Won	
