= Elizabeth Olowu =

Nigerian princess

Princess Elizabeth Olowu was a Nigerian sculptor and the daughter of Oba Akenzua II, who was a leader of the Edo people in what is now Benin City, Nigeria. Olowu works in bronze, a traditional material for her people (see Benin Bronzes), and is known as the first female bronze caster in Nigeria. Her sculptures have a traditional flow as well as a modern and feminist perspective. Her daughter is the artist Peju Layiwola. She is the daughter of the Oba Akenzua II, the Oba of Benin who reigned from 1933 to 1978.

== Early life and education ==
Princess Elizabeth Olowu was born in 1939 in Benin city, Edo State in the Southern part of Nigeria. Her Father was the paramount ruler of Benin kingdom and he is known as the King (Oba) Akenzua II. As a child, Olowu worked alongside her mother, learning to sculpt items related to palace life and ritualistic needs. Her father encouraged her education and interest in sculpture despite local superstitions discouraging women from entering bronze foundries. Olowu attended Holy Child College, Lagos, where she developed a love for reading. She continued her education at the Federal Emergency Science School where she majored in botany, chemistry, and zoology, which she later taught at the Anglican Girls' Grammar school. At age 18 she married her high school friend, Babatunde Olowu, and had her first child, Adedapo Tunde-Olowu in 1965. In 1966 she continued her education by enrolling in the University of Nigeria, however she had to abandon her studies when the Nigerian Civil War broke out in 1967 after finishing her first year.

She continued teaching once home and regularly organized art shows for her female students, which eventually attracted the attention of the director of University of Benin’s Creative Arts department, who invited her to join the Fine Arts program. In 1979 she graduated with a Bachelor of Fine Arts, and by the year 1981 she had begun to work on her post-graduate study, which included her thesis on “An Investigation into Benin Cire Perdue Casting Technique." This accomplishment made her the university's first female recipient of a Master of Fine Arts and the first Nigerian woman to cast bronze. In 1985 she received the Bendel State Award for Art and Culture and was later recognized by the Young Women's Catholic Association for her contribution to uplifting the status of women in her country. She now continues to work at the Benin University where she takes care of her own bronze foundry.

=== Career ===
As a female artist, Elizabeth Olowu's main desire is to "liberate womenfolk from the shackles of men, deprivation and taboos". In 1979 she sculpted an autobiographical sculpture of a young girl sitting at a desk while engrossed in a book. This sculpture was one of the first from her culture that depicted an individual female figure. The year 1983 was also an important year of her life. She explored, in depth, the themes of power from an emotionally diverse perspective. Some distinguished sculptures from this year include The Oba and Christ Bearing the Sins of Humanity. The Oba depicts her father, who was instrumental in facilitating her career and her education. The statue is made personal by bearing her handprint as a robe design. Christ Bearing the Sins of Humanity is over seven feet tall and shows a geometric Christ figure hunched underneath the weight of the cross.
