= Orun Oba Ado =

Archaeological site in Ife, Osun State, Nigeria

- Ọ̀run Ọba Àdó (Yoruba)
- Interactive map of Orun Oba Ado
- 7°29′12″N 4°33′02″E
- Type: Archaeological, Ritual, Historical
- Periods: Late antiquity Middle Ages, Early — Late
- Cultures: Early Yorubaland; Ife Empire
- Associated with: Obas of Benin; Ife Glass Industry
- Location: Odo Ogbe, Ilare IV, Ile Ife, Osun State. Nigeria
- Region: Western Africa

History
- Built: c. 560 AD — 656 AD
- Built by: Ife Confederation (Elu)

Site notes
- Excavation dates: 1958–1967, 1973
- Archaeologists: Frank WillettI, Peter Garlake.
- Condition: Partially excavated. A small shrine exists at the site.
- Early Ife (Yoruba) community

Orun Oba Ado (Yoruba: Ọ̀run Ọba Àdó) lit. Spiritual realm of Edo Kings, is an archaeological site, traditional shrine and historic quarter located close to the Obalufon market in the Ilare quarter near the center of the ancient city of Ife, southwestern Nigeria, noted for being the burial place of the heads and/or hair and nail clippings, or second burial funerary effigies, of several previous deceased Obas of Benin. The practice started from Eweka I, the first Oba of Benin, and lasted until the year 1888.

The area of the site is also known as one of the 'mega-houses' or clans of pre-urban Ife, and possibly one of the earliest centres for primary glass production in Ife, with its assemblage of glass beads, crucibles, cullets and its bead drilling anvil. In Yoruba traditional belief and narratives, Ife is known as Ilurun (Ìlú Ọ̀run) lit. "Gateway settlement to the spirit world".

== Name ==
The name Orun Oba Ado directly translates to mean: "Heaven of the kings of Edo", but would more appropriately mean: "Tomb of the Benin Kings".

== History ==
Orun Oba Ado was one of the early 'mega-houses' that coalesced to make up the Ife confederation, the first complex state formation in Yorubaland, and precursor to the Ife Empire. It was contemporaneous (formed at the same time) with, or settled shortly after the original thirteen clan settlements that were nestled in the Ife valley or bowl, called the Elú Mẹ́tàlá, prior to Ife's pre-pavement epoch of c. 800 — 1000 CE.

=== Traditions from Ife ===
The general tradition in Ife and Yorubaland is that the final resting place of an Oba is their 'home of origin' wherever that may be. Within Yorubaland, burials were usually oriented 'homewards', with the head of the deceased pointing towards Ife, and as a custom among Yoruba people, the hair and nail clippings of people who died 'abroad' were taken to the place of preferred burial, and decently interred with all the attendant funerary obsequies as if the actual corpse was present. Besides material culture and other physical funerary practices, there is the Yoruba belief, backed by the saying that "when an old man dies, he is said to have gone to Ife". Scholar of African and Yoruba art, Rowland Abiodun posits that the funerary heads of past Oonis found at Ife called Akọ, may have been placed on the alters of deceased kings for private royal ceremonies honouring them, consistent with the use of Ife royal art today. Blier however, proposes that they were cast as supports for sacred crowns in rituals associated with coronation of powerful priest-chiefs known as Obas, in Obalufon's reign.

In Ife, the traditional narrative is that Orun Oba Ado was the site from which the hero ancestor Oranmiyan set out from Ife to found the royal dynasty in Benin. Subsequently, it became the burial site for several Obas of Benin, and there are mentions of palace pages (Emese Ilosin) from Oyo, Iseyin, Benin and Popo (the coastal Gbe-speaking kingdoms) serving in the court of the Ooni. It was from the site of Orun Oba Ado that Oranmiyan set forth eastwards towards Igodomigodo, and whenever the Oba died, his head was 'returned home' in exchange for a model commemorative head in bronze for a second burial ceremony in Benin and placed on the alter of the royal ancestors. This was the custom, until the reign of Oguola who was able to persuade the Ooni to allow local production of the heads.

Orun Oba Ado is not the only ritual burial shrine in Ife. The Lafogido site close to the Wunmonije compound, named after an early Ife Oba of the same name is another. There, a terracotta elephant and hippopotamus head portrayed in Ife royal regalia, potsherd pavements, a miniature human head sculpture with vertical striations, fourteen pottery vessels with lids modelling various animal heads including rams, snakes, antelope, bulls were unearthed, and grave subsidence was observed. The burial chamber itself however, was left undisturbed. Radiocarbon dates from the site yielded a date in the 12th century AD (1100s). Obalara's land outside Ife's western rampart is yet another; there, the artefacts found included:

- Forty human skulls or part of skulls: 8 complete crania, 14 complete skullcaps, 12 almost complete skullcaps, and 5 additional skull fragments.
- A mass of two human long bones
- A copper wristlet (ring)
- Potsherd pavements
- Pottery-ware and terracotta figures of naturalistic heads, shoulders and torsos
- A decorated pot relief depicting a steep roofed shrine and a slithering snake with its head reaching from the pitch of the building roof downwards over the center.

A consistent set of four radiocarbon dates obtained from Obalara's land, yielded dates ranging between the 12th and 15th centuries, centering on the first half of the 14th century AD (early 1300s). The conclusion from the observations by Garlake was that the practise of burying and re-burying terracotta sculptures in ritual contexts, is an ife practice that goes back to at least the 1300s. Suzanne Preston Blier also concluded that it was a long-standing Ife tradition to keep sacred sculptures underground, and periodically unearth them for ritual ceremonies before reburying. Other ritual sites linked to royal funerary traditions include Ita Yemoo and the Iwinrin grove.

Further buttressing the traditions of a strong symbolic royal dynastic relationship and courtly exchanges between Ife and Benin is the fact that some pieces of art (bronze statue) made in Ife representing the person of the Ooni have been found in the Benin royal palace itself, and a pendant from Benin representing an Oba has also been found in Ife. At the Orun Oba Ado, there are two granite figures which according to local legends and beliefs were covers for two pits marking the entrance of the 'shortest route to the spirit world'. According to Bondarenko, the 'cult of the head' (including that of the Oba), popular among the Benins, may have been introduced from Ife, where he practice is also well observed, i.e Ori.

=== Traditions from Benin ===
There is evidence from Benin for the practice of certain burial and enthronement rites meant to serve as re-enactment rituals which had to be done at Ife lasting into the early twentieth century. The Ooni of Ife, known in Benin as the 'Oghene of Uhe' (the Edo words for the Ooni and Ife respectively) was formally acknowledged by the ancient custom of sending messengers to Ife to announce the holding of the Oba's annual sacrifices.

Several sources from Benin, including eye witness accounts allude to, or directly corroborate a tradition of royal burial and associated rituals at Ife. Benin historian Jacob Egharevba relates that the origins of this tradition goes back to the very first Oba, Eweka I. He also states that upon the death of a Benin Oba, 'the head of the royal corpse was subsequently exhumed and taken to the royal ancestral grave at Ile-Ife: but this was only done in every third reign', a journey that lasted about two years since the bearers were only allowed slow progress. Chief Eghobamien, the Obadagbonyi of Benin, son of the sword bearer to Obas Adolo and Ovonramwen and a close friend to Oba Akenzua II also alluded to the practice in April 1973. According to him, the death of every Benin Oba was communicated with Ife through a class of royal messengers known as the Ukoluhe, their journey usually lasted three years, and while at Ife, they performed a series of secret rites.

Another Benin eye-witness source was Agbonifi or Agbonefi who was part of the procession bound for Ife after the death of Oba Adolo who reigned c. 1848 – 1888, a journey his own father, Irughe or Erughe and late Osodin of Benin led. In 1916, two years after the death of Ovonramwen in exile at Calabar and the coronation of Eweka II, traditional emissaries, (the Uko l'Uhe) were sent to Ife on three different times to officially announce the new ascension. Robert Elwyn Bradbury the first social anthropologist on Benin art, history and culture, later successfully interviewed Agbonifi and took notes of the details of the journey from Benin to Ife. Adolo (Adolor) is said to have been the last king of Benin for which these particular rites were observed to be carried out for. While these customs lapsed by the end of the 19th century, they were replaced by one in which the Ooni is instead, impersonated by the Ihama (leader of the Ihogbe) who would go to the outskirts of Benin City and receive a message brought by another chief from the Oba of Benin to say that he has completed his ceremonies. The Ihama then gives this messenger a box containing a gift for the Oba as an approval gesture.

In Benin, the Osse (Ovia) river on the western edge of the Benin kingdom, between Benin City in the east and Udo in the west was the old traditional boundary of the Edo people, The village of Unuame (Mouth of the water) on the eastern side of the river was considered the traditional point of exit and was also the point of entry for the Ife-based royal dynasty that rules in Benin. It was also the final boundary for the exiled and the spirit of the dead out of the Benin kingdom. West of it was Udo, a formerly powerful kingdom that may have been of ife provenance.

Besides these, the Oba of Benin usually receives symbolic ritual gifts in cylindrical ekpoki containers from his 'father', the Ooni of Ife at various points in the annual cycle of kingship rites he performs, such as the Ugie ceremony. Another ethnohistorical piece of evidence of these connections is that during every new Oba's coronation, Yoruba tribal marks were drawn with chalk on his cheeks and then erased when the ceremony was over.

== The journey to Ife ==
Settlements and locations passed in the journey along the corridor between Benin and Ile-Ife in Bradbury's notes.

According to Agbonifi, he was 12 to 14 years old at the time when he accompanied his father, a member of the Ukọluhẹ to Ifẹ. The journey to Ife took place around six months after Adolor's death, and the route to the ancient city took them first through the Ihogbe quarters (Idumwun-Ihogbe) where they spent one night, then Egor, Omi, Unuamẹ, Ikoka, Udo, Iguobazuwa, Okha, Usẹn, followed by a three day journey through the forest to 'Ẹkuẹ' (Akure), onwards to Ilesha before eventually arriving Ife (Uhẹ). According to him, when they got to Ifẹ, the Oluhẹ (Olufẹ/Ọọni) was away due to war, and was instead at Okeigbo. He further stated that when they saw the king, he was not veiled, concealed or hidden in any way (as was usually the custom for Ife kings), however, an umbrella was carried over him. The Ọọni (Olufẹ) then sent them on to Ifẹ. He continued his narration saying that at Ifẹ, they handed 'him' (Adolor) over to the people's of the 'Ọba's Idumwu' there.

They (the Ukoluhe) did not perform any burial rites at Ife because according to Agbonifi, they were not the 'Oba's children', and he did not know what was done with the head except for the fact that it was buried. He further narrated that they took with them many gifts from the Oba including the Ada and Abere, and many other items made in Benin. On their way back, the 'Oluhẹ gave' them one man from each town to escort them back, including from; 'Etazama' (Ita Ujama (Ijamo), a village within Ife, near Ile Oluji), Oke-Igbo, and Isọya, among others. These men returned with the Ukọluhẹ to Benin to 'salute' the new Ọba, after which they returned.

Upon close scrutiny, the extreme details of Agbonifi's narrative seem to check out with the historical happenings of the time. Firstly, that was the period when the Ooni Derin Ologbenla of Ile Ife was resident in the town of Oke-Igbo, an Ife town about 40 Kms southeast off Ile-Ife due to war with Modakeke and Ibadan around 1882 during the wider Yoruba Wars, where he remained until the Yoruba peace treaties were signed. Furthermore, the path of travel as described by the informant aligned with known travel routes between Benin and Yorubaland.

== Archaeology ==
Preliminary reports in the 1960/61 dry season established the presence of eleven rock-cut burial pits or shafts, a figure which supports Egharevba's earlier claim that the remains of every third Oba was sent to Ife for interment, if the number of kings between Eweka I and Adolo are accounted for. Six of the eleven pits were excavated.

=== Dates, data and findings ===
Radiocarbon dating of the site provided dates ranging from the 6th through to the 10th and 12th centuries CE. At least three of the eleven burial pits contained glass beads, pit eight contained a 'stone anvil', and another pit contained decorated ritual pottery with figures of bats hanging upside down, which according to Willett is likely associated with royal contexts. Susan Mullin Vogel thinks that these vessels are the source of the corpus of Yoruba bronze rings depicting royal figures associated with multiple sacrifices. She believes these were made as a sort of material evidence to pass information to Ife that the mortuary rites of the dead king and the installation rites of the new one had been completed.

Charcoal samples from the same pit yielded a radiocarbon date of 865 AD ± 280. On the sides of two of the pits, there were small holes which served as footholds cut in by diggers to climb in and out.

The site had two different layers of potsherd pavements sealing its contents. Professor Willet comments that the date obtained from burial pit six is right about the date expected for the foundation of the earliest royal institutions in Benin, while the dates obtained from burial pit eleven is significantly older but could still represent a burial from its time period.

Carbon-14 Dates from some Orun Oba Ado burial pits.

- Charcoal from burial pit 11 — 560 AD ± 130
- Charcoal from burial pit 6 — 940 AD ± 150
- Charcoal from burial pit 6 — 990 AD ± 130
- Charcoal from burial pit 3 — 800 AD ± 120
- Charcoal from burial pit 5 — 800 AD ± 120
- HLHA Glass samples — 700 AD to 1100 AD

=== Interpretation ===
According to William Buller Fagg, the result of the excavations were inconclusive because no physical remains (i.e skulls) were recovered in the burial pits. Anthropologist and historian Dmitri Bondarenko explains that scholars usually do not reject the historical-ethnographic evidence as if false, but that instead, they clarify the issue further.

Furthermore, human skeletal remains have been recovered by Ekpo Eyo from another site in the Odo Ogbe area very close by (a few hundred yards away) with dates ranging between 1095 AD ± 90 and 1630 AD ± 95 at the bottom and upper levels respectively. Although the exact relationship between all the sites remain unclear, Frank Willett came to the conclusion that the pits of Orun Oba Ado were burial chambers.

Other excavations by Peter Garlake at Obalara's land and the Woye Asiri compound in Ife with dates ranging from 1135—1470, produced a 'surprisingly high' number of motifs linking the traditions of Ife and Benin, expressed in artistic work. These include; Human busts with snakes emanating out of their nostrils; Leopards' heads; 'Cat whisker' mark bearing heads; Human figurines with keloid-like scarifications above the eyebrows on the foreheads; snakes; and rectangular panels behind altars.

Frank Willet on his part believed that probably only body parts and/or hair shavings and nail clippings were buried there as ritual tokens. He supports this thought with traditions found among both the Edo and Yoruba peoples about such bodily parts being returned to ancestral homes as tokens and interred by family members whenever a man dies and is buried at a different place.

== Controversy ==
Some contemporary accounts from Benin have contested the accounts that there was ever a practice of ritual burial of any Benin Oba in Ife. Chief Edebiri, the immediate past Esogban of Benin (1929—2023), for example mentioned in a 2017 interview with journalists in Benin City and published in The Guardian newspaper that;

“It is absolute falsehood, that Benin Obas were taken to Ife for burial, it never happened in our history. The precursor of this present dynasty, Oronmiyan, who came from Ife as requested by the Benin people went back alive when he felt that he could not cope with the politics of Benin. He went back to Ife, maybe he would have been the one who died there and was buried and they now begin to say that is where Benin Obas were buried. I think that is where the notion came from; otherwise, the Oba that came after Orominyan, Eweka 1 died and was buried here according to Benin traditional rites within the palace environment. No Benin man can claim to know where the kings are buried. Then two successive Obas, the children of Eweka 1, both of them ruled within a space of two years, they died and they were buried here.”

The chief referenced the work of Edo historian Jacob U. Egharevba whom he eulogized as the "Doyen of Benin history", stating that Ewuare was buried in the village of Esi near Udo his mother's village, and that his burial place was actually preserved. However, he had stated prior that; "No Benin man can claim to know where the Obas are buried".

Although, the original remark made by the Owore of Otun Ekiti was that; "when any Oba died in Benin, they must bury such an Oba in Ile-Ife, since the time of Eweka", he clarified in his rebuttal that it was only the heads that were buried in Ife, not the whole bodies. Also, Chief Egharevba whom Edebiri quoted to support the assertion of local burial, was the same historian who recorded that part of the remains of every third Oba was taken back to Ife for internment rites after death. According to him, Oba Eweka had left stern instructions that his remains must be taken back to Ife, to be buried wit his fathers, an order which was carried out accordingly, and a practise which has continued for every third Oba since then.

== See also ==
- Ife Empire
- Oduduwa
- Oba of Benin
- Kingdom of Benin
- Ooni of Ife

== Bibliography ==
- Shaw, Ian (15 April 2008). A Dictionary of Archaeology. John Wiley & Sons. p. 296. ISBN 978-0-470-75196-1.
- Historical Society of Nigeria (1976). "Journal of the Historical Society of Nigeria". Journal of the Historical Society of Nigeria. 8 (3). Historical Society of Nigeria: 25–48.
- Falola, Toyin; Jennings, Christian (2004). Sources and Methods in African History: Spoken, Written, Unearthed. University Rochester Press. pp. 49–52. ISBN 978-1-58046-140-5.
- Akintoye, Stephen Adebanji (1 January 2010). A History of the Yoruba People. Amalion Publishing. pp. 1–510. ISBN 978-2-35926-027-4.
- Smith, Robert Sydney (1976). Kingdoms of the Yoruba. Methuen. ISBN 978-0-416-84710-9.
- Wesler, Kit W. (1998). Historical Archaeology in Nigeria. Africa World Press. p. 177. ISBN 978-0-86543-610-7.
- Egharevba, Jacob U. (1953). A Short History of Benin. Church Missionary Society Bookshop. p. 9.
- Nigeria, Historical Society of (1981). Journal of the Historical Society of Nigeria. Historical Society of Nigeria. p. 115.
- Shaw, Thurstan (1968). "Radiocarbon Dating in Nigeria". Journal of the Historical Society of Nigeria. 4 (3): 453–465. ISSN 0018-2540.
- Lankton, James W. (2006). "Early Primary Glass Production in Southern Nigeria". Journal of African Archaeology. 4 (1): 111–138. ISSN 1612-1651.
- Willett, Frank (1971). "A Survey of Recent Results in the Radiocarbon Chronology of Western and Northern Africa". The Journal of African History. 12 (3): 339–370. ISSN 0021-8537.
- Willett, Frank (1967). Ife in the history of West African sculpture. New York, McGraw-Hill. p. 132.
- Akinola, G. A. (1976). The Origin of the Eweka Dynasty of Benin: A Study in the Use and Abuse of Oral Traditions. p. 31.
