= Aruan of Udo =

Figure from Benin mythology

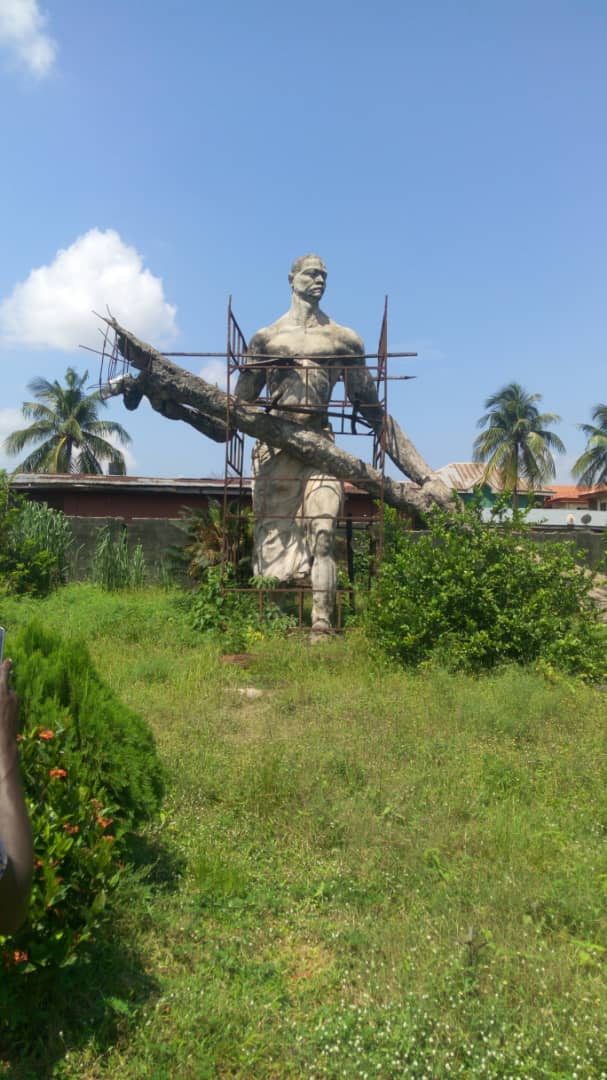
A monumental statue of Aruan of Udo with palm tree in Benin City

Aruan of Udo refers to a Benin mythical prince in the ancient city of Benin, born to Oba Ozolua by Queen Ohonmi in 16th Century.

== History ==
According to Benin's oral history, Aruan was a giant who could sweep the city of Benin using palm trees. Sometimes spelled as Arhuanran or Aruanran, Aruan was destined to be an Oba of Benin Kingdom, but the circumstances surrounding his birth meant he lost the throne to his younger brother who was born the same day. Benin Oral history says that Prince Idubor, who later became Aruan, was born in the morning but didn't cry at birth. His brother Prince Osawe, on the other hand, who later became Oba Esigie, was born in the afternoon by Queen Idia and cried first. As compensation for missing out on becoming Oba of Benin, his father, Oba Ozolua, made him the Duke of Udo, a town not far from Benin City.

== See also ==
- Edo People
- Kingdom of Benin
