= Unuamen, Nigeria =

Village in Edo state

Unuamen
- Unuame
- Location within Nigeria
- Location: Ovia North-East, Edo State, Nigeria
- Nearest city: Benin City
- Coordinates: 6°24′36″N 5°26′30″E

An aerial photograph showing Unuamen Community

An Aerial photograph of Unuamen tropical rainforest and the Ovia - Osse River, which passes other communities and empties into the Atlantic Ocean at the Bight of Benin

Unuamen also spelt Unuame is a dukedom and an ancient village community by Ovia river in Ovia North-East Local Government Area of Edo State, Nigeria. Unuame is about 15 kilometres (9 mi) from Benin City and 20 kilometres (12 mi) from Benin Airport. Unuame is believed to be one of the ancestral homes of Oba Esigie's maternal grandfather and home town to some group of Binis (Benin people). The people of Unuame have remained loyal to the monarch since the establishment of the ancient Kingdom of Benin. Being a part of the Kingdom of Benin, Unuame dukedom/community is at the heart of the tropical rainforest of Edo State, within Nigeria’s South-South geopolitical zone and the wider Niger Delta region, west of the Niger River Delta and inland from the Atlantic Coast.

Unuame dukedom and the sub-camps (including James camp, Abigor camp, Oreh camp, Tom camp, Ibara camp, Agurho camp, Ojibor camp and Okelujor camp amongst others) within the domain it covers is strategically along the swampy terrains on the east bank of the Ovia/Osse river. In other words, the community/dukedom is naturally bounded in the west by the Ovia/Osse river, the largest river in the Kingdom of Benin, and most of its economic activities revolve around it. The Ovia/Osse river flows through Unuame in the south-westerly direction towards Ite, Ikoro, Ikpako Gelegele and the Ughoton (Gwato) creeks; into the Benin River, which empties into the Atlantic Ocean at the Bight of Benin.

== Background ==
The exact time of arrival of the people of Unuame to its land is not precisely known. But oral narration and different books by Nigerians and European explorers and Archaeologists agreed that the first settlers at Unuame date back to before the first period (Ogiso era). Osamuyimen (2000) and Adodoh (2006) also believed that Unuame is one of the crucial villages which already existed in the Ogiso era (first period) in the 10th century. Unuame is known to have had a direct boundary with Omi village to the east at the time of the Ogisos, Oba Ewuare (1440-1473), Oba Ozolua (1480-1504) and Oba Esigie (1504-1547) among others. Today, between Unuame and Omi is Adeyanba, Okabeghe and Iguzama villages. Migrants originally founded these villages from Unuamen. For instance, Unuamen elders (edion) pegged the foundation tree (Ikhimwin) for Adeyanba and Okabeghe in keeping with the Benin tradition. From the Ogiso era, until Oba Esigie conquered Udo, the Ovia river at Unuame was reputed to be the boundary to exit or enter Igodomigodo land (Benin Kingdom). Giving weight to this claim, studies by Wesler and Allsworth-Jones (1998) maintained that the Ovia river at Unuame, between Benin and Udo, acted as the final boundary for the exiled and dead on their way out of Benin land, and also the point of entry for the Ife-based dynasty at Benin.

=== Traditional leadership ===
The traditional head of Unuame is the "Okao of unuame", a recognised chieftaincy title, and a viceroy to the Benin Monarch in Unuame since the reign of Oba Ewuare (I) (1440-1473). The traditional stool of the Okao of Unuamen is hereditary, and officially documented and validated in Gazette B-67 of the 1962 Annual Volume of the Laws of the Western State of Nigeria, page 27 of the 1972 Ministry of Home Affairs and Information (Local Government and Chieftaincy Affairs) and No. 16 of the Bendel State Traditional Rulers and Chiefs Edict of 1979.

== Economy ==
The main occupation of the people of Unuame includes farming, oil palm production, palm wine tapping, basket weaving, the local distillation of gin, trading, mud sculpture, fishing, animal trapping and hunting. Although, it has clay, bitumen, kaolin and river/sharp sand, among other minerals. Harnessing most of its natural resources will bring a lot of economic benefits to the community and the state. Factories that use sharp sand and clay as raw materials could establish in the community.

Unuame, like most communities in Ovia North-East Local Government Area of Edo State, is highly affected by urban migration as young and educated sons and daughter migrate to larger cities and abroad for more lucrative job opportunities. One of the festivals celebrated in Unuame is Ovia festival, a very colourful and crowd-pulling festival. Ovia festival and other celebrations throughout the year could provide occupation for many locals, such as in cultural dances, catering and costume making. The community is mainly accessed from the capital city (Benin) by road. However, the people also use the boat and canoe to transport themselves from one end of the Ovia/Osse river to the other while selling their goods, and during their fishing escapade.

== Historical Events in Unuamen Surrounding Different Obas ==
Since time immemorial, Unuame has been at the centre of most historical events surrounding Obas, such as Oranmiyan (1170), Oguola, Orobiru, Ewuare, Ozolua and Esigie, among others, in the Kingdom. Perhaps, due to Unuame's location as the entry and exit point of the then Benin Empire.

=== Events in Unuame Relating to Oranmiyan (1170 A.D.) ===
Oranmiyan about 1170 A.D. was received and hosted by Unuame "edion", during a brief stay, on his way to Benin from Ife. However, Nyame (1977) argued that the archaeological evidence at Unuame and Udo could mean that the advent of Oranmiyan and Ife traditions may have arrived later than most previous estimates.

Oranmiyan arrived Unuame from Ife via the western route, which was the "Uhe-Ayere-Ikare-Ogho-lfon-Usen-Unuame-Ego-Benin" route, on his way to Benin. Supporting this claim, Wesler and Allsworth-Jones (1998) pointed out that river Ovia between Benin and Udo at Unuame, was the point of entry for the Ife-based dynasty at Benin. Oranmiyan descended from a canoe at Unuame where he first had his legs on Benin land at a location known as "Eghute-Oba" (Oba's sea/river-shore) by the Ovia River. He was lodged at "Aro-Oleku" for a period before leaving Unuame for Benin through Ego. Although, it is uncleared how long Oranmiyan stayed at Unuame before continuing to Benin through Ego.

=== Events in Unuame Relating to Oba Oguola (1280-1295) ===
During the reign of Oba Oguola (1280-1295), his daughter (Uvbi) made a stop at Unuame on her way to her betrothed husband Akpanigiakon in Udo. However, the princess did not like the idea of the marriage. Hence, she stayed briefly at Unuame where she was sheltered and protected by the elders before returning to Benin City. Uvbi's refusal to marry Akpanigiakon and her decision to return to Benin from Unuame prompted the war menace from Akpanigiakon which ended when Oba Oguola defeated him at the battle of Urhezen (Urhoezien).

=== Events in Unuame Relating to Oba Orobiru (1400-1432) ===
In the reign of Oba Orobiru (1400-1432), elders welcomed and supported Prince Ogun (Ewuare I) when he arrived Unuame to cross the Ovia river and exit Benin. While at Unuame, Prince Ogun stayed a while before crossing the Ovia river to many different places, including Usen. Omoregie (1972) reiterated what Oba Orobiru said to his brother Prince Ogun on a quote: "Prince Ogun! I have ordered my guards to take you to Unuame on the Ovia River. You will cross that river, and if you return to my Kingdom during my lifetime, you will be killed".

=== Events in Unuame Relating to Oba Ewuare (I) (1440-1473) ===
Following his accession in 1440, Oba Ewuare (1440–1473), founder of the Benin Empire, visited Unuamen to participate in the Ovia Festival (Ehor-Ovia) and undergo initiation (Ógua) into the Ovia cult. There, he encountered Ogiemwanre, a young Ovia priest and distinguished warrior, whose military prowess had been instrumental in the campaign against Udo (Pers. Comm.). In recognition of his service, Oba Ewuare (1440-1473) bestowed upon him the title of Okao of Unuame (Pers. Comm.).

Before ascending the throne, the east bank of the Ovia (Osse) River—where Unuamen sits—marked the final frontier for people entering or departing Benin territory in the west. At the edge of the kingdom, Unuamen served not only as a geographical boundary but as a spiritual and cultural threshold.

When Oba Ewuare (1440-1473) ascended the throne, he inherited a fractured realm—a kingdom evolving from scattered chiefdoms into a centralised empire. At the heart of this transformation lay fierce opposition, most notably from Udo, a powerful settlement on the west of Unuamen. Udo’s chiefs defied Ewuare’s authority, controlling vast fertile lands and key trade corridors. The looming threat from Udo demanded more than military might—it required spiritual fortitude.

In a bid to seek spiritual fortification ahead of the impending war with Udo, Oba Ewuare (1440-1473) journeyed to Unuame to participate in the Unuamen Ovia festival (eho-Ovia) and undergo initiation into the Ovia cult. This sacred rite was officiated by Ogiemwanre (Pers. Comm.). His dual role as Ovia priest and a fearless fighter would prove decisive in the battles to come.

After the ovia festival at Unuame, Ogiemwanre joined Oba Ewuare (1440-1473) in the Udo war. Oral history says Benin warriors including the young Ogiemwanre, under Ewuare’s leadership, laid siege to Udo. Battles were fought near the Unuamen Ovia Riverbank, with Benin using both superior military strategy and spiritual warfare. Udo was subdued, its leaders displaced, and its people absorbed into the Benin Kingdom. This victory solidified Ewuare’s control and allowed him to expand Benin’s influence westward and southward.

Impressed by Ogiemwanre’s courage and loyalty, and to prevent the Empire from invasions through Unuame riverside frontier, Oba Ewuare (1440-1473) honoured him with the title of Okao of Unuamen— the traditional head of the community. He was installed with the Ada (sword of state, symbolising authority) and the Eben (ceremonial sword, symbolising power), making the Okao of Unuamen the first hereditary Okao title in Benin history.

Oral tradition records that Okao Ogiemwanre continued to fulfill the duties of the Ovia priest alongside his role as Okao until old age, when he eventually delegated the priesthood to a family member during the reign of Oba Esigie (1504–1550).

Oba Ewuare’s (1440-1473) participation in the Unuamen Ovia Festival and initiation into its Ovia deity may have been influenced by his earlier exile to Unuame as Prince Ogun, following his banishment by his brother, Oba Orobiru. His brief stay there likely left a lasting spiritual impact on him.

Oba Ewuare (1440-1473) often referenced Unuamen in his proverbs. For example, High Priest Osemwengie Ebohon, in a 2016 lecture on Ewuare’s legacy, quoted one of the Oba’s sayings:

"Igbevb' Etete, Igbevb' Unuamen; Ovbokhan I y' ugieyonyonmwen". Meaning, "I danced in festivals at Etete village, I danced in festivals at Unuame village; No child can deride me with festivals".

=== Events in Unuame Relating to Oba Ozolua (1480-1504) ===
Oba Ozolua (1480-1504) was a conqueror who also frequented Unuame during his reign to make vows before the Ovia of Unuame and offer sacrifices to it in order to have a peaceful reign in Benin. According to Jungwirth (1968), “when he got to Ovia N’Unuame he declared again if he returned safely from Ora he would offer a sacrifice with a ram, four feathers from a parrot, chalk and some cowries”.

=== Events in Unuame Relating to Queen Idia and The Fierce Battle Between Esigie (1504-1550) and Arhuanran ===
Upon Oba Ozolua’s death in the early 1504, a succession crisis erupted. Ozolua’s two sons fought for the throne. Esigie, backed by his mother Idia, was based in Benin City; Arhuaran ruled from Udo (reviving Udo’s ambitions). Arhuaran’s faction in Udo challenged Esigie, sparking another internal conflict.

Unuamen again emerged as a decisive theatre of history. An aging Okao Ogiemwanre and his people rallied behind Oba Esigie (1504-1550), standing in opposition to Arhuaran’s rebellion from Udo. According to Egharevba (1968: 26) and WAJA (1976: 144), at the start of the sixteenth century, Oba Esigie, with the help of his mother Queen Idia, gathered the Benin army at Unuame on the River Osse/Ovia and from there launched an attack which finally destroyed the might of Udo and his giant half-brother Arhuaran. Similarly, Darling (1984) maintained that Queen Idia provided the crucial help Oba Esigie needed in Unuamen to cross the Ovia river, conquer Udo and win succession to the throne. As also noted by The Nigerian Field Society (1975: 160), Aruanran strongly rebelled, so Esigie mustered the Benin army at Unuame on the east bank of the river Osse. There, some say, the two half-brothers Esigie and Aruanran met each other in conference for the last time. Unable to reach a compromise, the Benin army behind Esigie surged down to the embarkation point and invaded across the Ovia/Osse river to defeat Udo, their tens of thousands of feet wearing down a great, wide gully to the waterside.

The cooking pots of the great army behind Esigie created a midden heap of ashes and broken pots some fifty yards wide and a few hundred yards long. Archaeologist Darling (1984) noted the unusual presence of many pottery sherds on Unuame's shores, verifying a large, temporary occupation from the early sixteenth century that supported oral history.

Before this battle, Queen Idia went to Unuamen to make a solemn vow at the Ovia shrine: if her son Esigie triumphed over Arhuaran, he would honour the shrine and take part in the Ovia festival. Okao Ogiemwanre, who was fulfilling the duties of the Ovia priest alongside his role as Okao, officiated these sacred rites. Some oral traditions even suggest that Queen Idia’s connection to Unuamen was personal — that Ogiemwanre may have been Esigie’s maternal grandfather. Others believe she came purely on the advice of diviners. Pers. Comm.)

=== Oba Esigie At the Unuame Ovia Festival (Ehor-Ovia) ===
True to his vow, Oba Esigie returned to Unuamen after the war. He took part in the Ovia festival and underwent the sacred initiation rites officiated by Okao Ogiemwanre. Elders recall that Esigie remained in Unuamen for “Ukpiha” — a period of about two years — celebrating the Ehor-Ovia festival and further elevating the prestige of the Ovia cult. According to Egharevba (1949: 86), dancing and masquerades form an important part of Ovia festival, which were elaborated by King Esigie who made the groove at Unuame the centre of the Ovia Cult.

To reward the aging Okao Ogiemwanre and to ease the burden of dual responsibilities, Oba Esigie granted him the unprecedented privilege of appointing a dedicated Ovia priest from within his family. This arrangement allowed Okao Ogiemwanre to focus on his role as the traditional head while maintaining the Ovia rites through an appointed priest. To this day, the Okao of Unuamen, if present during Ovia functions, sits to the right of the Ovia altar, while the Ohen occupies the left seat — a unique tradition not shared by other Okao with the dual role of Okao and Ohen-Ovia or communities with Ovia deity in Benin Kingdom.

The events at Unuamen during this transformative period left an indelible mark on Benin’s history. The widespread veneration of Ovia across the kingdom can be traced directly to Esigie’s victory. As pointed out by Darling (1984:144), Nearly all Benin Kingdom villages which practice the Ovia shrines claim that it was introduced during Esigie's reign. No doubt the prestige associated with the victory over Udo was an important factor in making Ovia N'Unuame, the most widespread cult in Benin. Today, the Unuame primary school is named after Esigie; and the Unuame edion can point out Esigie's monument, although now a heap of the earth little different from a disused termitary. Annual offerings are still made there, preserving the memory of a time when warriors, priests, and queens shaped the destiny of the Benin Kingdom.

== Unuamen Artifacts and Historical Reserve ==
Unuamen, a surrounding neighbourhood of Okomu Forest Reserve and serene community with the conducive climatic condition and environmentally friendly people, has Ecotourism assets. A stretched layout of rainforest land with rich and diverse flora and fauna and a variety of wildlife, among which is the endangered white-throated monkey and African dwarf crocodile. The Ovia/Osse river with free-flowing current and annual hydropower potential of 61.619 MW, runs on Unuame western borders. This southerly flowing river is also Okomu Forest Reserve's main drainage and eastern boundary, therefore, making Unuame one of its peripheral communities as shown on the map of Okomu Forest Reserve. Unuame has many other attractions, artifacts and historical sites.

In 2017, the Edo State Commissioner for Arts, Culture, Tourism and Diaspora; Hon Osazee Osemwengie-Ero, visited the historical locations in Unuame on behalf of the then Edo State Governor. Expressing delight at the historical sites, the commissioner said on a quote: "Today I have seen what I read in books about Oba Esigie and Queen Idia and where the event happened. It is overwhelming. What I saw in Unuamen are worth preserving as they take us way back to over 300 years ago".

The Unuame Government proposed Tourism Centre known as "UNUAMEN HISTORICAL RESERVE" hoist the entry route of Oranmiyan (1170-1200) into Benin kingdom; the renowned Queen Idia Pots, waterpots and food bowls (Okebu) used in cooking for Benin army and hosting Udo warriors to a mysterious defeat. Annually, the Unuamen people create a cultural celebration, whereby the elders of the community offer prayers at the POTS. There is also the Odighi where Ovia anchored and the location of the conference/meeting place where Oba Esigie and Arhuanran met each other for the last time. Additionally, there is Oba Esigie's war camp, monument (a mound) and precious stone (Okuta-Esigie) used during the famous war against Udo and Arhuanran, to mention but a few. Consequently, Unuamen has become a tourist destination for students of history (Vanguard Nigeria, 2018).
