= Uselu =

- Neighborhood of Benin City
- Interactive map of Uselu
- Coordinates: 6°24′32″N 5°36′51″E
- Country: Nigeria
- State: Edo State
- LGA: Egor
- City: Benin City
- Time zone: UTC+1 (WAT)
- ZIP code: 300212

Uselu is a densely populated neighborhood of Benin City, Edo State, Nigeria. It is the headquarters of Egor local government area.

Uselu is the site of the traditional grounds of the Edaiken N'Uselu (Duke of Uselu) palace as well as the palace of the Iyoba of Benin.

== History ==
When King Ozolua died in the fifteenth century, he left behind two sons to dispute the royal succession: Esigie controlled Benin City, the kingdom's metropolitan center, while his brother Arhuaran was based in Udo – an important provincial seat 20 miles away. Neither prince was prepared to yield to the other, partisans soon declared for one or the other, and Benin was plunged into a civil war shortly thereafter.

Seeing an opportunity to take advantage of the situation, the hitherto vassal Igala people declared their independence from Benin and seized a swath of territory to its north. In the span of a week, Esigie found himself confronted with what now seemed like the almost certain fragmentation of his father's kingdom.

His mother, Idia, is reputed to have stood behind him at this time. By serving as everything from his counsellor to his priestess, she rallied the Binis – including many that had previously supported Arhuaran – to Esigie's standard. After dealing decisively with her stepson, the royal pair turned their attention to the Igala rebels. Following a hard fought campaign, Benin's supremacy was restored, and the victorious army – with Esigie and Idia at its head – returned to the capital in triumph.

In gratitude for his mother's efforts on his behalf, King Esigie created a new office – that of Iyoba – for her to occupy. Now ranking equal to the senior chiefs of the royal court, the Iyoba was also built her own palace in the town of Uselu, which was thereafter attached to her title as a perpetual fief. She was the first woman in the history of Benin to have such power.

== Economy ==
Uselu Market is among the most popular markets in Benin City, and has up to 5,000 shops. It is also a hub for corporate firms such as banks and fast food chains.

== Crime ==
Uselu has high rates of gang activities, cult killings, and armed robberies. In many cases, police response times are unfavorably slow, and usually receive public criticism.

== Flooding ==
Uselu-Lagos Road is prone to flood and residents have contacted the government regarding their concerns, however the issue has not yet been resolved.
