= Ezomo =

Ezomo may refer to:

== People ==
- Kostas Ezomo (born 1989), Greek basketball player
- Ezomo Iriekpen (born 1982), birth name of English footballer Izzy Iriekpen

== Other uses ==
- Ezomo of Benin, a title held by the supreme war chief in the ancient Benin Kingdom
