= Offiong =

- Gender: Unisex

Origin
- Language: Ibibio
- Origin: Nigeria
- Meaning: Moon or moonlight
- Region of origin: South-south Nigeria

OffiongAudio is a Nigerian unisex given name and surname of Ibibio and Efik origin which means "moon" or "moonlight".

== Notable people with the name ==
- Richard Offiong (born 1983), English footballer
- Offiong Offor, Nigerian politician
- Offiong Edem (born 1986), Nigerian table tennis player
- Cecilia Offiong (born 1986), Nigerian table tennis player
- Essien Etim Offiong III (born 1859), Nigerian aristocrat
