= Adolo =

19th century ruler of Benin

Oba of Benin
- Reign: 1848–1888
- Coronation: 1848
- Predecessor: Osemwende
- Successor: Ovonramwen
- Born: Odin-O VDA
- Died: 1888
- Spouse: Arokun
- Issue: Ovonramwen
Regnal name
- Adolo
- House: House of Eweka

Adolo (r. 1848–1888) originally known as ODIN-O VDA, was the thirty-fourth Oba (ruler) of Benin in the 19th century. He was the son of Oba Osemwende and the brother of Ogbewekon, who rebelled against his rule in 1853 but was defeated shortly after. He led many campaigns on cities and took down rebels in his kingdom with the help of his military commanders, Ebohon and Ezomo Osarogiagbon. He was also known as a kind-hearted, wise king who helped with the upkeep of the elderly and helpless. He also founded many cities in his kingdom and established new markets.

== Early reign ==
Adolo ascended the throne of Benin in 1848 after the death of Oba Osemwende. Four years later, his brother Ogbwekon rebelled against his rule, hoping to take the throne for himself. Stationed in Igueben, he went on to disturb the peace to put more pressure on Adolo's rule, hoping to gain support. After rebelling, he instigated further rebellions in the area during 1853–1854. General Ebohon was chosen to take command in countering the rebellions in the city, and he led a series of successful campaigns during 1853–1854, destroying the rebels and being rewarded by Adolo. But after the rebels were countered, Adolo said, "Do not say that Ogbewekon was my enemy. He was no enemy to me at all, but was my real brother. We were born on the same day. If he is dead, it is an indication that my own death is also approaching." After Ebohon was awarded the Iyase of Udo, he went on his way to the city, but died before he was able to assume office. Oral history recounts that an Iroko Tree sprang out of his head at the spot in which he was buried.

== Late reign ==
After Ebohon's death, in 1879, Ilesha was occupied by Ibadan warriors under Ajayí Ogboriefon and Ogbedengbe and had to take refuge at Itagbolu in Ekiti. After a few years, the Ibadans under Babalola, invaded Ekiti. Under the command of Ogbedengbe and Balogun Asa, the Ekitis held them back for a couple of months, but they became exhausted, eventually asking for Oba Adolo's help. Hundreds of Edo warriors were sent the following couple of days and the Idabans were defeated, eventually suing for peace with the Ekitis. After the taking down of the Idabans, the Ekitis sent presents to the Oba and continued their yearly tribute. Ogagun, one of the sons of Obegbo, after leaving Benin during the reign of Oba Osemwende and returning during the reign of Oba Adolo, was granted the title, Osasemwoyen by the Oba.

He was known for being a famous magician and influential figure in the Benin Empire. He was honored and respected among the people of Benin. Eventually, he would marry Prince Idugbowa's (Ovonramwen) daughter, Arokun. He named his grandson Usuanlele, born for Ovonramwen by Arokun. Oba Adolo, seeing the names that Ogagun created, suggested that he commit suicide because he was endangering his son's life. Ogagun eventually said that he did not wish to die yet and could not be compelled to do it. Ogagun then began a series of sacrifices after the arguments he had with Oba Adolo, eventually saying "Tell Adolo to send the necessary victims to me direct to be slaughtered and eaten instead of sending them to Squares and high places because I am not a lower creature to eat sacrificial victims in the Squares like dogs." But in 1882, Ogagun was forced to commit suicide after some time.

== Death ==
Oba Adolo eventually died in 1888, allowing for his son, Prince Idugbowa (Ovonramwen) to succeed him.

Adolo Oba of Benin Born: unknown Died: 1888
Regnal titles
| Preceded by Osemwende | Oba of Benin; 1848 – 1888 | Succeeded by Ovonramwen |
