= Babalola =

Babalọlá
- Gender: Male
- Language: Yoruba

Origin
- Origin: Nigerian
- Meaning: Father is wealth
- Region of origin: Southwest Nigeria

Babalọlá audio is a Nigerian name of Yoruba origin meaning "Father is wealth." or "Father is honour or prestige."

== Notable people bearing the name ==
- Afe Babalola (born 1929), Nigerian lawyer
  - Afe Babalola University founded by Afe Babalola
- Isaac Babalola Akinyele (1882–1964), Nigerian royalty
- Joseph Ayo Babalola (1904–1959), founder of the Christ Apostolic Church in Nigeria
  - Joseph Ayo Babalola University
- Solomon Babalola (1926–2008), Nigerian poet, author and scholar
- Solomon Adeniyi Babalola (1929–2021), Nigerian Baptist pastor and administrator
- Chinedum Peace Babalola, Nigerian pharmacist
- Charles Babalola (born 1990), British actor
- Lekan Babalola (born c. 1960), Nigerian jazz percussionist and musician
- Remi Babalola, Nigerian minister and banker
- Rilwan Lanre Babalola (born 1968), Nigerian minister and energy economist

=== Politics ===
- Akin Babalola Kamar Odunsi, Nigerian businessman and politician
- Babalola Borishade (born 1946), Nigerian politician
- Andrew Babalola (politician) (born 1961), Nigerian politician

=== Sports ===
- Taye Babalola (born 1991), Nigerian football player
- Oladipupo Babalola (born 1968), Nigerian football player
- Olu Babalola (born 1981), British basketball player
- Gideon Babalola (born 1994), Nigerian badminton player
