= Unuamen =

Unuamen may refer to:

- Unuamen, Nigeria, or Unuame, a village in Edo state
- Story of Wenamun, ancient Egyptian text
