= Ohen =

Oba of Benin (1334–1370)

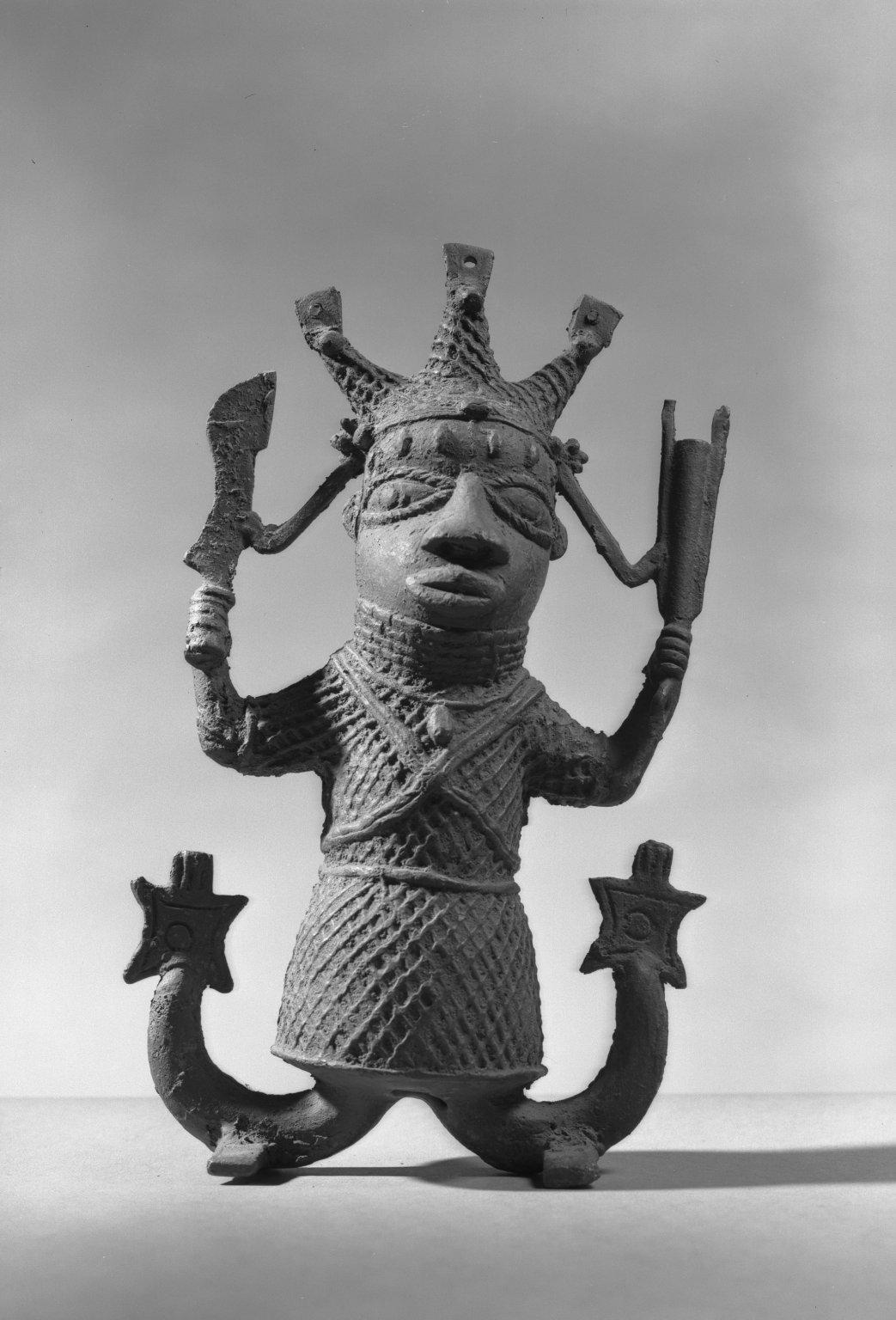
- The mudfish legs on this figure of an Edo leader may represent Ohen's paralysis.

8th Oba of the Kingdom of Benin
- Reign: c. 1334 – c. 1370
- Predecessor: Udagbedo
- Successor: Egbeka
- Died: c. 1370
- Cause of death: Stoning
- Spouse: Elẹrẹ (according to oral traditions)
- Issue: Egbeka; Orobiru; Ogun (later Ewuare); Uwaifiokun
- House: House of Eweka
- Father: Oguola
- Religion: Edo religion

Ohen was the eighth Oba ('king') of the Kingdom of Benin, reigning from c. 1334 to c. 1370. He succeeded Udagbedo and was succeeded by his eldest son, Egbeka. He was the third son of Oguola. According to Anne Walthall, in oral tradition, it is stated that during his rule, Ohen oversaw 7 female weavers at the Benin Palace. Upon his discovery that the women had been selling royal cloth at public markets, he replaced them, permanently leaving royal cloth weaving as the responsibility of palace men.

He became paralyzed after 25 years of rule. Following attempt to cover up his condition and its discovery by Iyasẹ Emuze, he had Iyase killed. Later, Iyase's chiefs stoned Obem to death with kaolin-coated rocks, either in reprisal for the Iyase's killing or since his paralysis meant he lost the divine powers.

Ohen Oba of the Kingdom of Benin Born: ? Died: 1370
Regnal titles
Preceded by Udagbedo	Oba of the Kingdom of Benin c. 1334 – c. 1370	Succeeded by Egbeka
