= Akenzua I =

Oba of Benin (r. 1713–1735)

- Predecessor: Ozuere
- Successor: Eresoyen

Akenzua I was Oba ('king') of the Kingdom of Benin between about 1713 and 1735. He took the throne from his brother Ozuere after a succession crisis following the death of their father Ewuakpe and was succeeded, on his own death, by his son Eresoyen.

== Life and Reign ==
The early part of Akenzua's reign was said to be difficult, with issues of succession arising when his younger brother Ozuere declared himself Oba. Ozuere was subsequently killed and Akenzua installed as Oba. His success during the civil war was likely, at least in part, due to access to Dutch firearms. Following the conflict, restructuring of the military would occur, with changes to titles and positions instituted.

Akenzua's reign saw a strengthening of the power and reputation of the monarchy, through reconquest, and he is possibly the Oba who signed the treaty between the Kingdom of Benin and the Dutch in 1715. During his reign, he strengthened the custom of male primogeniture. He also led changes in the artistic style of Benin, including adding altar pieces.

Akenzua may have also had an illegitimate half brother, Ehennua, who would later become 'Ezomo' or head of war.

Akenzua I Oba of the Kingdom of Benin Born: ? Died: 1735
Regnal titles
Preceded by Ozuere	Oba of the Kingdom of Benin c. 1713 or c. 1735	Succeeded by Eresoyen
