= Essien Etim Offiong III =

Nigerian aristocrat

Essien Etim Ofiong III (c.a. 1859–1911), also known as Etinyin Essien Etim Offiong, (Note: The word "Etinyin" is a title usually used to address Efik aristocrats who were founding fathers of communities and patriarchs of large clans. It is a conjunction of the word "Ete", father and "Nnyin", we or our. It translates to "our father") was the founder of Essien Town in present-day Calabar. He was a political agent during the early years of the colonial era and was instrumental in the establishment of the Catholic Church at Old Calabar. He was also instrumental to the establishment of Ikot Ishie, whose founder, Obong Ishie Offiong Okoho became a beneficiary of Offiong's land gift among other things.

== Early life ==
Offiong was born into the Offiong Okoho royal family of Old Calabar around 1859. His father was Chief Etim Offiong Essien Abasi who hailed from Duke Town. His mother was Edim Edem Ekpenyong Offiong Okoho, a daughter of King Eyamba V. He was also of Efut ancestry through his maternal grandmother who was from the royal family of Asikpo Ito of Ibonda, an Efut town in Western Calabar. At a young age, he was sent to the then Gold coast, (now Ghana) to begin his educational journey. After his studies at Ghana, he furthered his studies at the Fourah Bay College at Freetown, Sierra Leone. On completion of his studies, he proceeded to advance his educational career at Berlin. His global education and exposure made him develop strong leadership qualities at an early age. Essien possessed a number of skills such as entrepreneurship administration, leadership, negotiation, merchandise etc. He eventually specialised mainly in agriculture, real estate, importation and exportation etc. He became an influential figure and a financial heavyweight as a result of his connections and hard work.

== Political agent ==
Prior to his official appointment as a political agent, he worked as an assistant for Magnus Adam Duke, one of the earliest political agents at Old Calabar. Offiong received his appointment as a political agent from the acting district commissioner, A. G. Griffith on 27 April 1896. He received a dual mandate to act as the clerk of the Native High court in Calabar as well as the supervisor of all minor courts in the district. His job entailed that he would aid the government in maintaining peace, order and stability in the district. As remuneration, Offiong was to receive a paltry annual income of £40 with an annual increment of £5 as a clerk of the Native court while as a clerk of the minor courts, his salary commenced at £100 with annual increment of £5. Although his salary was meagre compared to what was paid to European administrators, Offiong did not depend on his salary as his source of livelihood. Offiong was a wealthy man prior to his appointment. According to Oku, "Like his contemporaries, he was a very wealthy man who owned vast estates and a large fleet of trading canoes which plied the calabar waters."

As a political agent, Offiong spearheaded several projects within Calabar such as the construction of roads, bridges, rest houses, court houses etc. He was assigned to look after the affairs in the upper Akpayafe river (Ododop) area. His knowledge of the upper Cross River district was useful to Chief Coco Otu Bassey, another political agent. While acting as a political agent, he also supervised other people who would later become political agents such as Richard Henshaw (Edet Ekeng Ita). Offiong was described as "a man of transparent honesty, integrity and undoubted capability." An example of his attitude and commitment to work was when he was appointed to oversee an enquiry aimed at investigating an allegation of an obstruction of the river by Chief Coco Bassey. According to Nair, "...Chief Coco-Bassey hindered the trade of the river by requiring those who used it (at Itu) to pay a toll applied equally to all traders-Efik, Umon or Akunakuna". Offiong investigated into the allegation and revealed that no such tolls had ever been obtained by Chief Coco Bassey or his workers. His execution of the assignment earned him high commendation. Another example of Offiong's commitment to work was when he was made acting Etubom of Obutong sometime around the 1890s. Offiong was very passionate about his job and always wished to carry out his tasks with perfection. However, his role as acting Etubom was only backed by government support and he soon realised that he had several constraints in enforcing Government orders as head chief of Old town. Due to his inability to enforce government orders, in 1902, Offiong wrote a letter to James Watt the district commissioner requesting that he be relieved of his role. Offiong also supported the setting up of businesses at Calabar. For instance, in 1898 he rented out a portion of land situated at Henshaw town beach to Ulrick Peterson of Berlin who was doing business in Calabar.

== The founding of Essien town ==
Prior to the establishment of Essien town, Offiong had lived in the Eyamba ward at Duke town. It was as a result of one of the bitter feuds between his family members and himself that led him to make the decision of jettisoning his Eyamba family. At first, he planned on moving to Ibonda, his grandmother's community. So he set sail on the Calabar River with his family and slaves to Ibonda. As they sailed along in his personal boat, they drummed loudly and sent coded signals with the sound of their drums. As they approached Obutong, The chiefs of Obutong were attracted by the drumming and upon spotting the famous Essien Etim Offiong sailing by, they intercepted him and invited him to live among them. Since his mother was a daughter of Obutong and as a matter of his matrilineal rights, he was given the portion of land now known as Essien town or "Enen Essien Etim" as it is called by the Efik. This signalled another phase of a Prosperous and influential life for Etinyin Offiong. In his new settlement- which was a virgin and unspoilt bushland, Etinyin grew on almost all fronts; Family, business, connections, possessions etc. From a wealthy young man living peacefully among his kith and kin back in Eyamba, he had now become a possessor of a city and arguably one of the wealthiest men of his generation, what with his numerous assets, his large family, a host of slaves and several other royal accoutrements. He designed the early landscape of Essien Town and breathed life into the dead jungle hitherto inhabited by snakes and bush animals. He marked out where he wanted the city centre to be including the community farming area, estates for his slaves and the one for his blood children and even another large portion to be reserved for his unborn Grandchildren and Great-grandchildren. The road layouts later developed by future governments followed his initial design, exactly how he wanted his city to look like. In no time, he had built his own storey building at "Akwa Esit Ebiet", his residence in Essien Town. This storey building was the first of its kind in the western Calabar area. In his new town, he excelled much more than he ever did previously as no sooner had he arrived Essien Town than he again began to embark on his foreign business trips, importing and exporting, establishing new contacts across the world and attracting development into Essien Town and Calabar at large.

== The establishment of the Roman Catholic Church in Calabar ==
Offiong's distant travels led him to observe the evangelical work of the Roman Catholic mission in Sierra Leone, Fernando Po in Equatorial Guinea and other countries he had visited. Upon his return to Calabar, he wrote a personal letter to Pope Leo XIII in Rome, requesting that priests be sent to Calabar for missionary work. The letter was referred to the Asaba vicariate. In response to this request, the catholic mission ordered for priests to be sent to Calabar. Two French priests, Frs. Drs. Leon and Lejune and another priest were sent to Calabar from Onitsha, first in 1894 and returning finally in 1903 where they set the record that year (1903) of having celebrated the very first Catholic mass in Calabar at No. 19 Bocco Street. Thus, Etinyin Essien Etim Offiong III holds the honour of solely facilitating the establishment of the Catholic Church in Calabar.

Despite his involvement in the establishment of the catholic church, Offiong was not a self-professed Christian. He was a celebrated lover of several pleasures such as a great love for fashion, material possession, drinks, power etc. His quest for social influence also led to his membership of several masonic societies including Foresters, Noble Order of Odd Fellows and the World Fellowship of Free Masonry 197 I.C. He was the first African to win the Golden Sword of the Free Masonry. His commitment to these societies later waned as a result of his contact with the catholic missionaries.

== Friendship with Oba Ovoranmwen of Benin ==
Offiong's social network had the like of Colonialists, monarchs, business gurus etc. A very dear friend of Offiong was the Oba of Benin, Ovoranmwen Nogbaisi. On the 17th of February 1897, the Benin Empire was conquered by the British and their king, the Oba of Benin was banished from his kingdom and sent on exile to Old Calabar. The Oba had a very large family but was only allowed to take two of his wives with him to Calabar. While at Calabar, he was in the care of Etinyin Essien Etim Offiong. The Oba and his family lived in Essien Town and Offiong lavished them with the classical Efik hospitality until his own death in 1911 which prompted the Oba to relocate from Essien Town to main Calabar where he eventually died in 1914.

== Death ==
Offiong was struck by an illness and died on 14 February 1911. His remains were buried in "Akwa esit ebiet", his residence and the same ground where his storey building once stood.

== Bibliography ==
- Oku, Ekei Essien (1989), The Kings & Chiefs of Old Calabar (1785-1925), Calabar: Glad Tidings Press Ltd., ISBN 978-30541-0-4.
- Duke, Orok Orok Efiom (2015), 20th Century Famous Kings and Eminent Persons of Calabar, Calabar: Excel Publishers, ISBN 978-978-051-036-7 OCLC 1084506344.
- Aye, Efiong U. (1994), Akpabuyo in Transition, Calabar: Glad Tidings Press Ltd., ISBN 978-30541-2-0.
- Nair, Kannan K. (1972), Politics and Society in South Eastern Nigeria, 1841–1906: A Study of Power, Diplomacy and Commerce in Old Calabar, London: Frank Cass, ISBN 0-7146-2296-6.
- Eyo, Anne (1986), Efik political agents of Old Calabar, Calabar
- Hackett, Rosalind I. J. (1989), Religion in Calabar: The religious life and history of a Nigerian town, Berlin: Mouton de Gruyter OCLC 470747014
- Offiong, Michael Ukpong (1993). The ancestral cult of the Efik and the veneration of saints (Thesis). Pontificia Facultas theologica et Pontificium Institutum spiritualitatis Teresianum, Rome. OCLC 1203523445
- Duke, Orok Orok Effiom (2008), Great Calabar Chronicle: People, World Events and Dates, 1500-2007, Calabar: Clinprint International, ISBN 978-978-016-624-3.
- Roth, H. Ling (1903), Great Benin: Its customs, art and horrors, Halifax, England: F. King & sons Ltd.
