= Ezomo of Benin =

3rd highest ranking chief in the Benin Kingdom

Ezomo of Benin is a title held by the supreme war chief in the ancient Benin Kingdom. The chief with the Ezomo title is the 3rd highest ranking chief in the Benin Kingdom. The title was initially awarded to any notable warrior in the Kingdom by the Oba of Benin. However, during the reign of Ezomo Ehenua, the Oba of Benin Kingdom, Oba Akenzua I, made the title hereditary to the Ehenua family. The Ezomo is known to live in Uzebu in a semi-independent state.

== Ezomos of Benin Kingdom ==
- Ezomo Ehenua
- Ezomo Odia
- Ezomo Ekeneza
- Ezomo Erebo
- Ezomo Osifo
- Ezomo Uzama
- Ezomo Osarogiagbon
- Ezomo Omoruyi
- Ezomo Asemota
- Ezomo Aiweragbon
- Ezomo Okponmwense

== See also ==
- List of the Ogiso
- Kingdom of Benin
- Oba of Benin
