= Ovonramwen =

Oba of Benin from 1888 to 1897

Oba Ovonramwen
- Oba of Benin
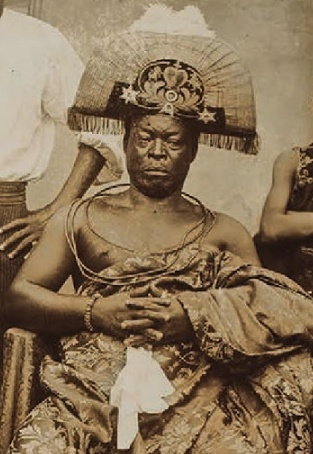
- Ovonramwen, c.1888–1914

Oba of Benin
- Reign: 1888–1897
- Predecessor: Adolo (r. 1848–1888)
- Successor: Eweka II
- Born: c. 1857
- Died: c. January 1914; Calabar

Oba Ovonramwen Nogbaisi, also called Overami, was the thirty-fifth Ọba of the Kingdom of Benin reigning from c. 1888 – c. 1897, up until the British punitive expedition.

Born circa 1857, he was the son of Ọba Adọlọ. He took the name Ovọnramwẹn Nọgbaisi at his enthronement in 1888. Every Ọba took a new name at his coronation, Ovọnramwẹn meaning "The Rising Sun" and Nọgbaisi meaning "which spreads over all".

At the end of the 19th century, the Kingdom of Benin had managed to retain its independence and the Ọba exercised a monopoly over trade which the British found irksome. The territory was coveted by an influential group of investors for its rich natural resources such as palm oil, rubber and ivory.

The kingdom was largely independent of British control, and pressure continued from figures such as Vice-Consul James Robert Phillips and Captain Henry Gallwey (the British vice-Consul of Oil Rivers Protectorate) who were pushing for British annexation of the Benin Empire and the removal of the Ọba.

== British expedition and overthrow ==
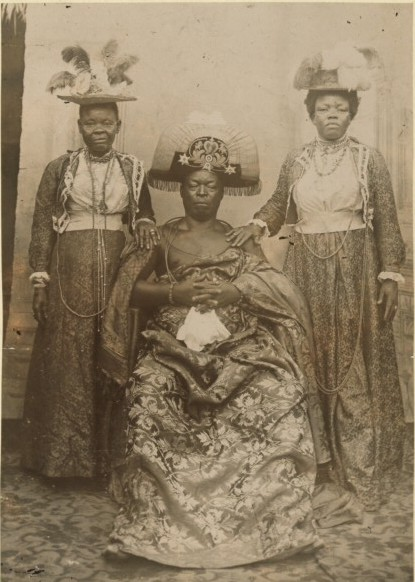
Ovonramwen Nogbaisi with his wives, Queen Egbe (left) and Queen Aighobahi (right), c. 1898–1913

In November 1896, James Robert Phillips, deputy commissioner and consul for the Niger Coast Protectorate, decided to visit and meet with Ovonramwen in Benin City in regards to the trade agreement that the Oba had made with the British but was not keeping. He formally asked his superiors in London for permission to visit Benin City. In late December 1896, without waiting for a reply or approval, Phillips embarked on an expedition. A British delegation departed from the Oil Rivers Protectorate in January 1897 with the stated aim of negotiating with the Oba of Benin. Perceiving this to be an attempt to depose the Oba, the Oba's generals unilaterally ordered an attack on the delegation as it was approaching Benin City (which included eight unknowing British representatives and hundreds of African porters and labourers). Phillip's expedition was ambushed and all but two were killed.

Subsequently, a punitive expedition against the Kingdom of Benin in 1897 led by Sir Harry Rawson resulted in the razing of Benin City, the looting of the Benin Bronzes, and the destruction of the city's fortifications. Although the British had orders to execute the Ọba, Ovonramwen escaped, but returned to the city to formally surrender on 5 August 1897. When Ovọnramwẹn returned to the city, after six months spent in evading capture in the forest, he was richly dressed and laden with coral beads and accompanied by an entourage of seven hundred to eight hundred people. He attempted to escape exile by offering Consul General Ralph Moor 200 puncheons (barrels) of oil worth £1500 at that time and to disclose where his 500 ivory tusks were buried (of a value of more than £2M at that time). However, this offer was dismissed as Moor had already discovered them.

The expedition was described as a British invasion force headed by Phillips set out to overthrow the Ọba by Sven Lindqvist in his book Exterminate All the Brutes. According to Lindqvist, the force had weapons hidden in baggage, with troops disguised as bearers. Lindqvist states that Phillips's plan was to gain access to Ovonramwen's palace by announcing that he intended to negotiate. Lindqvist states that Ovonramwen's messengers issued several warnings not to violate Benin territorial sovereignty, claiming he was unable to see Phillips due to ceremonial duties and that despite being warned on several further occasions on the way, Phillips sent his stick to the Ọba, a deliberate insult designed to provoke the conflict that would provide an excuse for British annexation.

== Exile ==
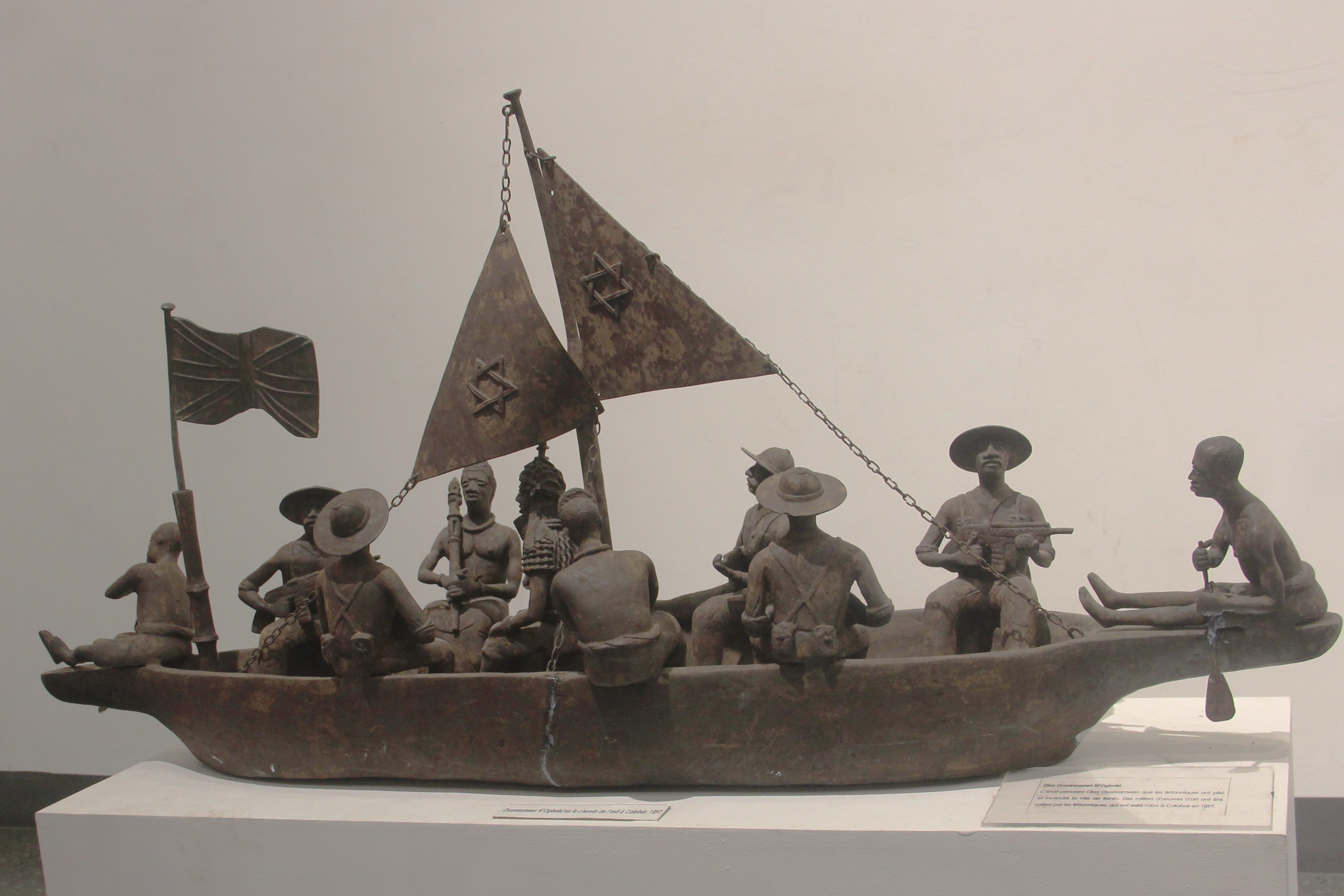
Sculpture of Ovonramwen being exiled, Museum of Black Civilisations, Dakar

Ovonramwen was exiled to Calabar with two of his wives, Queen Egbe and Queen Aighobahi. He was received and hosted in Calabar in a small town called "Essien Town" by Etinyin Essien Etim Offiong, the progenitor of Essien Town. He died in Calabar around the turn of the new year in 1914. Ovọnramwẹn was eventually buried in the grounds of the royal palace in Benin City. He was succeeded by his first son and legitimate heir, Prince Aguobasimwin, who ruled as Eweka II.

Ovonramwen Oba of Benin Born: c. 1857 Died: c. January 1914
Regnal titles
Preceded by Adolo	Oba of Benin c. 1888 – c. 1897	Succeeded by Eweka II
