= Esigie =

Oba of Benin (1504 AD–1550 AD)

- Oba of Benin
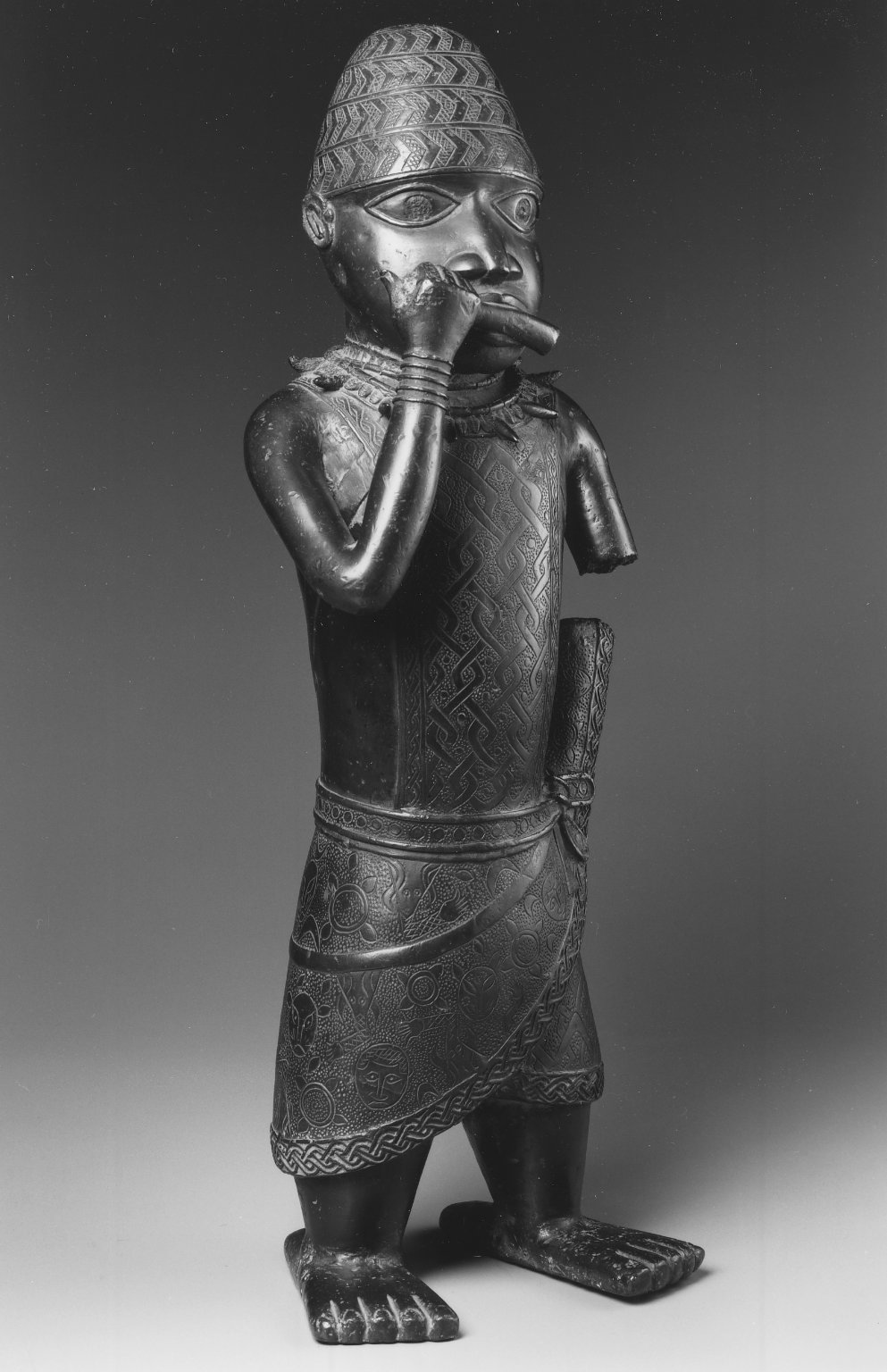
- An Edo figure from the reign of the oba Esigie (c. 1504 – 1550) Brooklyn Museum

Oba of Benin
- Reign: 1504 AD – 1550 AD
- Predecessor: Ozolua
- Successor: Orhogbua
- Died: c. 1550; Benin City
- Spouse: Elaba
- Father: Ozolua
- Mother: Queen Idia

Esigie (also spelt Oseigie), originally known as Osawe, was the son of Oba Ozolua, who reigned in the late 15th century, and his second wife, Queen Idia. He was the sixteenth Oba who ruled the medieval Benin Kingdom, now Benin City, Edo State, Nigeria from c. 1504 – c. 1550. Works of art commissioned by Esigie are held in prominent museums including the Metropolitan Museum of Art and the British Museum.

After Ozolua's death, Esigie controlled Benin City, while his brother Arhuaran controlled Udo, a town about 30 kilometres (20 mi) northwest of Benin City, that was nearly its equal in size and influence. Following a bitter power struggle with Arhuaran, and with major assistance and support from his mother Idia, Esigie gathered the Benin army at Unuame on the river Osse and from there launched an attack and overthrew Arhuanran. Esigie became Oba of Benin and would later fend off an attack from the Igala people.

Esigie started a tradition in Benin by abolishment of the killing of the king's mother, giving Idia the title of Iyoba (or Queen Mother), and providing the Eguae-Iyoba (Palace of the Queen Mother) in lower Uselu for her use. Idia was responsible for many cultural innovations that still hold strong in Benin's cultural history; she notably dressed as a man marched alongside her son and led Benin to victory in the Idah battle of 1515. When Idia died, her protege and Esigie's wife Elaba would go to support the Oba until his death c. 1547.

Esigie Oba of Benin Born: Unknown Died: c. 1550
Regnal titles
Preceded by Ozolua	Oba of Benin; 1504 AD – 1550 AD	Succeeded by Orhogbua
