= Rilwan Lanre Babalola =

Nigerian politician

Federal Minister of Power
- In office 17 December 2008 – 17 March 2010
- Succeeded by: Goodluck Jonathan

Personal details
- Born: 1968

Rilwan Lanre Babalola was appointed Nigerian Minister of Power on 17 December 2008 after a cabinet shuffle by President Umaru Yar'Adua. He left office in March 2010 when Acting President Goodluck Jonathan dissolved his cabinet.

== Background ==
Babalola gained a PhD in Energy Economics from the University of Surrey, United Kingdom. He was an investment banker with Lead Bank in charge of the Public Sector and Infrastructure Department.

Babalola joined the Bureau of Public Enterprises (BPE) in November 2001 as head of the Power Sector Team. Under a program assisted by USAID and later the World Bank, he was responsible for reform measures including setting up the Nigerian Electricity Regulatory Commission, and unbundling the Power Holding Company of Nigeria (PHCN). After leaving the BPE, he was Deputy General Manager at the Nigerian Electricity Regulatory Commission for a short period. He then joined the Economic Advisory Team of President Umar Yar'adua.

== Minister of Power ==
Appointed Minister of Power in December 2008, Babalola faced a challenging job, with severe lack of power generation and transmission facilities, tangled regulations and a highly ambitious program to expand capacity.

In February 2009 Babalola suspended the Executive Chairman of the Nigerian Electricity Regulatory Commission, Ransome Owan, and six commissioners. They had been arrested by the Economic and Financial Crimes Commission (EFCC) on 3 February 2009 for allegedly misappropriating N1.54 billion in 2008. Babalola had initiated the action. In March 2009, he said President Yar'Adua has approved removal of the Executive Vice chairman of PHCN, Bello Suleiman, and two executive directors, due to disagreements about how the massive investment in the power industry by the Federal Government should be allocated.

In September 2009 Babalola argued that delivering 6000MW of generating capacity was highly ambitious but attainable. In February 2010 it was revealed that power supply had in fact fallen to 2,700 mW from 3,710 mW at the end of the previous year. Babalola blamed the problem on inadequate natural gas supply for the new generators. Failure to meet the target resulted in calls for his dismissal.

In January 2010 Babalola said that there would be a slow-down in the process of unbundling the Power Holding Company of Nigeria due to concerns about the viability of private power generation in the current tariff and regulatory structure, and the need to establish rules to ensure a level playing field in the competitive market. He announced plans that included construction of additional gas-fired generation stations near the source of supply in the Niger Delta, reducing vulnerability to pipeline disruptions, and major projects to build transmission and distribution facilities to eliminate bottlenecks in the grid. He also said the government was encouraging private-sector power generation projects.

Babalola left office on 17 March 2010 when Acting President Goodluck Jonathan dissolved his cabinet. When a new cabinet was formed on 6 April 2010, President Jonathan took personal responsibility for the Ministry of Power, and did not name a minister.
