= Remi Babalola =

Nigerian technocrat

Aderemi Waheed Babalola is a banker and former minister of the Federal Republic of Nigeria.

== Family and Academic Background ==
Born in Ibadan, Oyo State, he began his secondary education at Prospect High School, Ibadan, Oyo State of Nigeria in 1975, obtaining his West African School Certificate (Division 1) in 1980. He proceeded to the Oyo State College of Arts & Science (OSCAS) for his higher school and advance level education in 1980. By 1982, he completed his HSC and Cambridge “A” level certificates with three principal passes in each. Remi studied at the University of Ibadan, Oyo State between 1982 and 1986 led up to the award of a bachelor's degree (with honours) in Agricultural Economics. Between 1991 and 1993, he attended the University of Lagos, Akoka Lagos where he obtained a master's degree in Banking and Finance. An alumnus of the Lagos Business School (LBS), Remi completed the Advance Management Programme at the LBS in 2000. In addition, Remi had participated in local and international workshops, courses, seminars and programmes during the path of his private and public career.

== Job Experience and Personality ==
Remi has worked in fields as diverse as financial and credit analyses, trade financing, investment banking, funds management, international and local banking operations. Formerly the Financial Controller and Chief Strategist of Zenith Bank, Remi was responsible for bank-wide planning and budgetary process, domestic treasury and foreign exchange management support, and establishment and coordination of the profit centre concept.

His other previous job experiences include a four-year stay with Arthur Andersen. While there, he was responsible for auditing, consulting, training and development assignments in the Banking and Finance Group. He also had a stint with Price Waterhouse for 18 months.

== Professional Affiliations ==
Remi is a fellow of the West African Insurance Institute, Chartered Institute of Taxation of Nigeria, Institute of Chartered Accountants of Nigeria, Institute of Directors of Nigeria, and Chartered Institute of Bankers of Nigeria.

== Private and Public Practice ==
Remi is currently the Pro-chancellor and Chairman of the Governing Council of KolaDaisi University, Ibadan, Oyo State, a privately owned university approved by the National Universities Commission of Nigeria in November 2016. He is also on the Board of Trustees of the Institution.

Remi is also on the advisory board of Apis Partners, an ESGI-native global private equity and venture capital asset manager that supports growth stage financial services and financial infrastructure businesses by providing them with catalytic growth equity capital.

Remi was the Chairman/Chief Strategist of Alternative Capital Partners Limited, a Securities and Exchange Commission (“SEC”) registered Advisory and Fund/Portfolio Management firm from February 2011 to February 2022. The firm in conjunction with Swede Control Limited, acquired a majority stake in Law Union and Rock Insurance PLC in 2012.

He served as a Non-Executive Director, Vice Chairman and later as chairman of the insurance company (now Tangerine General) until his exit in 2020.

On April 30, 2021, he got appointed as a Non-Executive Director and the Chairman of FBN Holdings PLC by the Central Bank of Nigeria, a position he held until resigning on December 17, 2021.

He was a Minister of State for Finance of the Federal Republic of Nigeria, from July 26, 2007, to September 16, 2010. In October 2008, Remi was appointed supervising minister for the federal capital territory, in addition to his responsibilities as finance minister; he served in the former position until end-2008.

He resigned as minister on professional grounds in the wake of the furore generated by his claim that the state oil monopoly was broke. Following his claim on the oil monopoly's insolvency, Remi was moved out of the ministry of finance to the special duties ministry, a development which led to his immediate resignation as minister of the federal republic.

Remi's stint in public office was marked by a concern with transparency that began with him being one of the first ranking federal government officials in the Umar Yar'Adua administration (2007/2011) to declare his assets. This focus on improving the public expenditure management framework led to his institution of curbs on the irregular deduction from source of funds from provincial and municipal governments' statutory allocations.

Remi was an executive director of First Bank of Nigeria in charge of Lagos and West business as well as consumer banking and electronic payments until his appointment as Honourable Minister of State for Finance on July 26, 2007.

Remi was a Deputy General Manager (DGM) and Divisional Head of Corporate Planning & Group Coordination of the Bank before his appointment to the Board. The overarching focus of his job was involvement in turning First Bank into the "Clear Leader" of the Nigerian Financial Landscape.

Remi was a General Manager with Zenith Bank Limited before he was headhunted by FirstBank. At Zenith Bank, he rose through the ranks from a Deputy Manager to a General Manager, over a decade of banking work.

== Philanthropy ==
He is highly involved in philanthropy, mentoring and empowerment/development of small and medium enterprise through his Remi Babalola Initiatives Incorporated. In 2009, Remi raised US$1 million to build a state-of-the-art clinic (known as Remi Babalola Red Cross Medical Centre) for the Nigerian Red Cross Society in Ibadan, the Oyo State Capital. The facility has since supported the delivery of primary healthcare services in Ibadan.

Remi is married to his lovely wife, Oluwabunmi Babalola and blessed with children.
