= Ewuare =

King of the Benin Empire from 1440 until 1473

- Oba of Benin
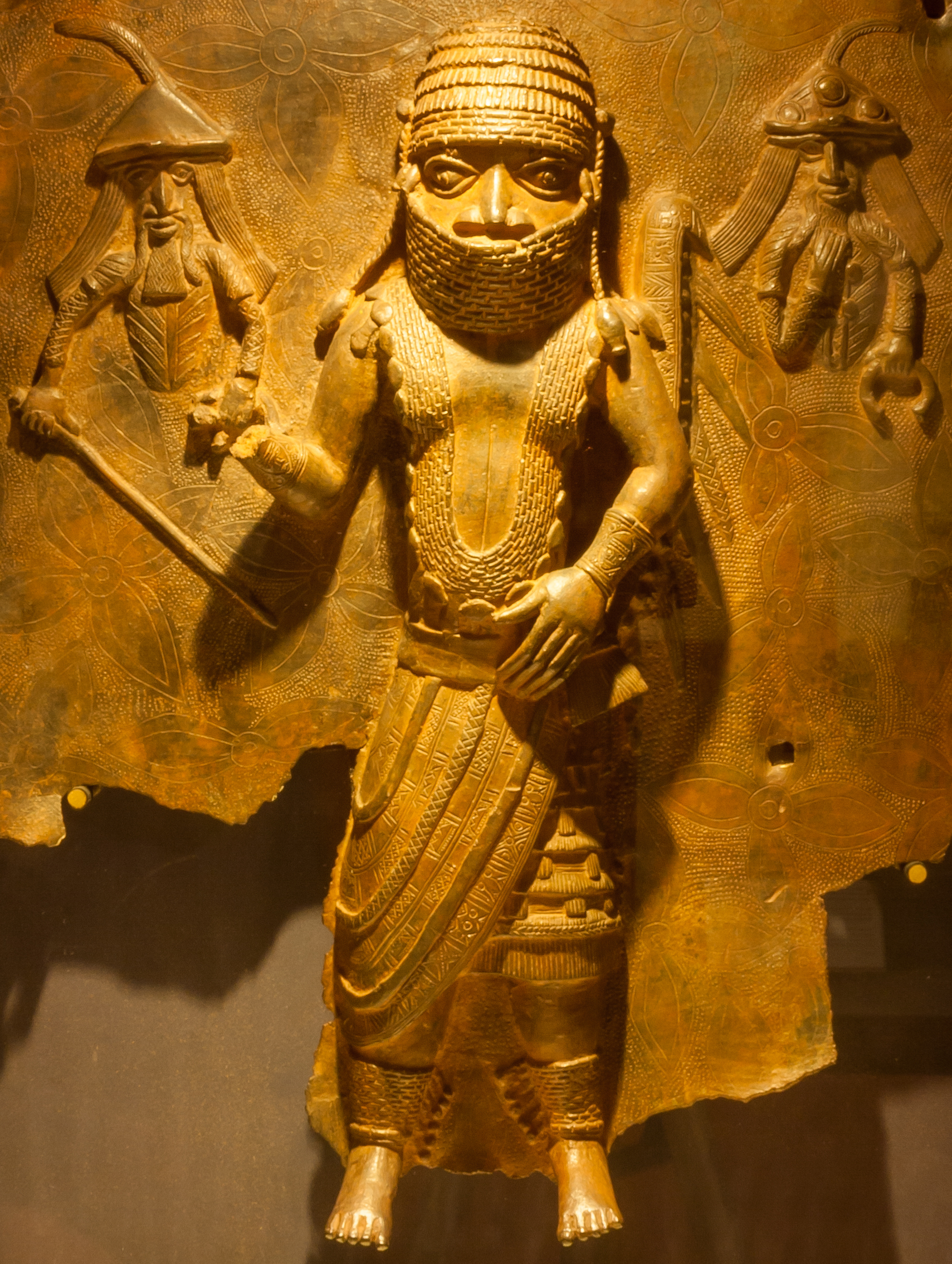
- A brass plaque depicting Ewuare at the Horniman Museum
- Reign: 1440–1473
- Predecessor: Uwaifiokun
- Successor: Ezoti
- Died: 1473
- House: Ogiso Igodo
- Father: Ohen

Bronze of Oba Ewuare I, flanked by guards

Ewuare (also Ewuare the Great or Ewuare I) was the Oba (king) of the Benin Empire from 1440 until 1473. Ewuare became king in a violent coup against his brother Uwaifiokun which destroyed much of Benin City. After the war, Ewuare rebuilt much of the city of Benin, reformed political structures in the kingdom, greatly expanded the territory of the kingdom, and fostered the arts and festivals. He left a significant legacy and is often considered the first King of the Kingdom of Benin.

== Rise to power ==
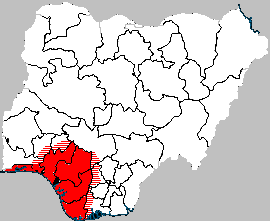
Unverified size of the Benin Empire at its height. Borders are modern states of Nigeria.

Prior to Ewuare, the Oba of Benin was limited in their power and authority by the uzama, a group of hereditary chieftains throughout the kingdom. The uzama were able to appoint the Oba of Benin upon the death of an Oba and could limit any efforts by the Oba.

The rise of Ewuare to a position of power is chronicled by Benin's oral history. Ewuare was born as the third son of the Oba Ohen. At this point, Ewuare was known by the name Prince Ogun. Ohen was deposed and stoned to death after both of his legs were paralyzed since it meant he lost the divine powers. A controversy arose upon the death of Ohen when both Prince Ogun and his brother Prince Irughe was exiled by Oba Orobiru, Ohen's second son. Ohen's first son, Oba Egbeka had ruled upon their father's death but did not last long. In exile Ogun then traveled widely throughout the region visiting many different kingdoms. Local historian Jacob U. Egharevba contended that after the death of Orobiru, both Ogun and Uwaifaikon were banished from the city, but then Uwaifaikon was able to return, lied to the Uzama, and was named king.

One popular oral history contends that while Prince Ogun was exiled he performed a favour for a jungle spirit and as a result got a magic bag, called Agbavboko. Agbavboko had the magical qualities that no matter what Ogun put into the bag, it had more space and whenever he reached in he could pull out whatever he desired. During his travels, he gathered significant magical and herbal knowledge from a variety of sources. At one point, he felt the need to sleep under the sacred uloko tree and the tree told him to return to Benin City and reclaim the throne. On his way back to the city, he removed an infected thorn from a lion's paw and the lion gave him a magic Talisman which he could use to create any situation in the world he desired. He arrived in Benin City surprised to find a parade for his brother Uwaifaikon while the people were in destitute circumstances. Prince Ogun used the talisman to set large parts of the city on fire. He then reached into Agbavboko and pulled out a bow with a poison arrow which he then used to assassinate Uwaifaikon. In the confusion that ensued, he hid with a slave, named Edo, that had taken care of him when he was young and who recognized him immediately in the chaos. Supporters of Uwaifaikon entered Edo's house and killed him trying to find Ogun who had hidden. Ogun then exited the house and gathered his supporters and was able to assert his right to the throne. In Egharevba's version, during a visit to the city during his exile, Ogun was taken in by a prominent chief who hid him in a dried well but then went to tell the authorities. The head slave of the chief, named Edo, let down a ladder into the well and advised Ewuare to escape.

Ogun then took the name Ewuare translated to "the trouble has ceased". Eventually, the honorific Ogidigan (the Great) was appended and he is often known as Ewuare Ogidigan or Ewuare the Great. The date for his rise to the throne is usually dated to 1440. To honor the slave that had sacrificed his life to save his, Ewuare also renamed the city to Edo (now Benin City).

== Rule ==
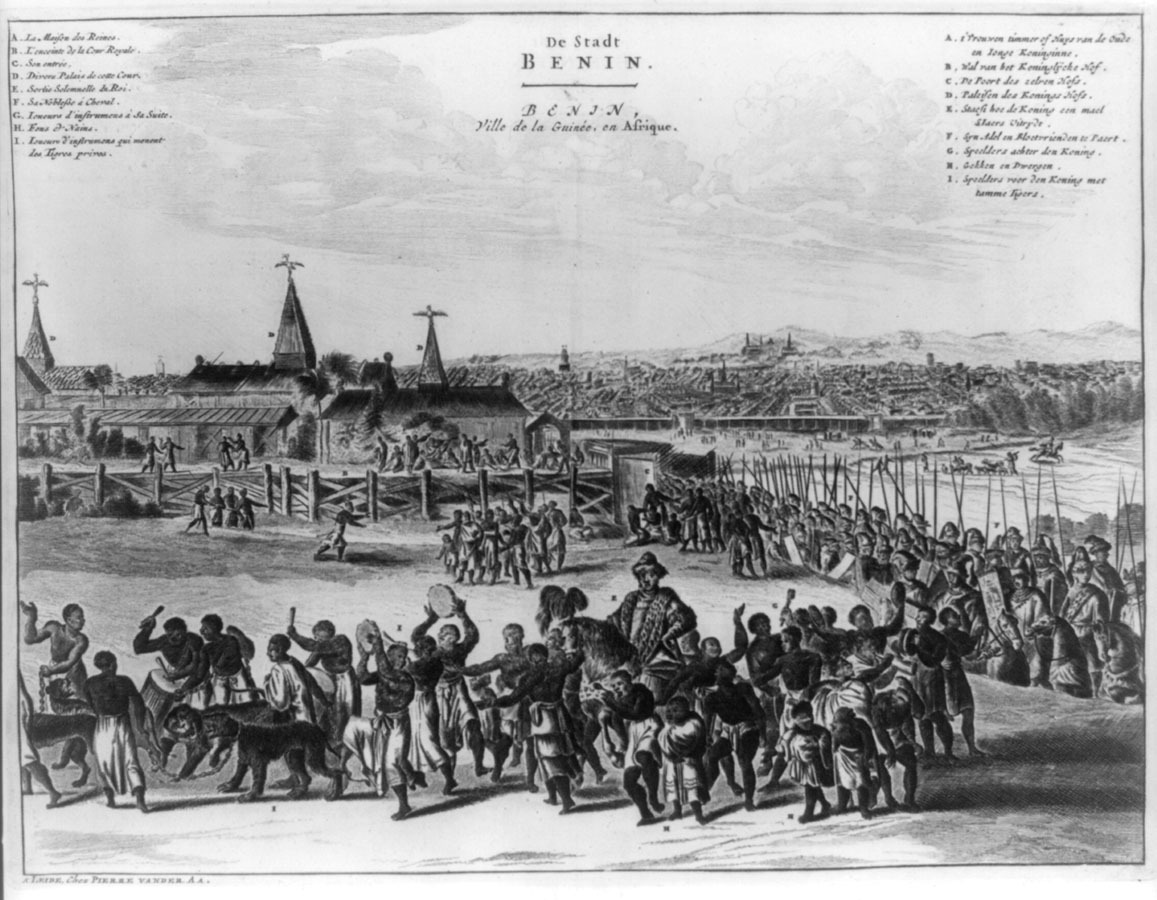
Depiction of Benin City (1668)- Many features, the large walls, the moat, and the palace were directed by Ewuare

Ewuare is often considered a key state-reformer and crucial in many aspects of state formation in the Benin empire. He consolidated the power of the Oba, changed lineage procedures, and created an administrative structure for the Empire. In addition, he greatly expanded the empire and took over a significant territory.

A major administrative development undertaken by Ewuare was reducing the power of the uzama chiefs which were a limiting force on the Oba. Ewuare removed their ability to appoint the Oba and instead adopted a clear succession going to the first-born son. In adopting this primogeniture lineage system, the authority of the uzama was greatly decreased. In addition, to clarify the situation, Ewuare developed the Edaiken title for the oldest son to clearly establish the lineage. One oral history dates this development to a situation in the city of Uselu. The chief of Uselu, Iken, had become an ally to Ewuare. At one point, another city was revolting against Ewuare's rule and Iken mobilized an army to end the revolt. Because he did not have anyone to rule Uselu, Ewuare sent his oldest son Kuoboyuwa to serve in the town until the war was over. Iken died in the fighting and since he had no heir, Kuoboyuwa became the ruler. This incident created a clear succession to the oldest son of the king with the title Edaiken derived from the incident.

Ewuare also created two additional layers of administration in towns and villages with the creation of the Eghabho n'ore (town chiefs) and Eghabho n'ogbe (palace chiefs). These acted as administrative arms, directly appointed and accountable to the Oba, who would collect tribute, deal with legal issues, and generally take part of the affairs of state. To foster this, Ewuare encouraged the freeborn population to work in the palace for small wages as part of these different orders.

In addition, Ewuare was successful at taking over a number of cities and towns in the region for expanding the empire. He personally led the army against many of the Edo communities, living west of the Niger river, and key Yoruba settlements like Akure and Owo. In towns that he took over, he quickly replaced the ruling elite with chiefs of his administrative system who were his allies. Oral history recount 201 victories by Ewuare over the various cities and towns creating a large empire centered in Edo.

The capital city of the empire was rebuilt during Ewuare with significant redesign. Around Benin City (then Edo), Ewuare built significant walls and moats, large boulevards within the city, and clearly divided zones for different craft work. Archeological evidence has found that the walls built around the palace and the city, and even out into the country, were significant constructions taking multiple years to complete. In addition, he rebuilt the palace and created a clear division between it and the rest of the capital city. The division was further emphasized through the introduction by Ewuare of scarification for freeborn citizens to differentiate them from the slave population. Egharevba establishes a different source of the scarification that developed in the Kingdom. Oral histories used by Egharevba suggest that during his reign, his oldest son Kuoboyuwa (the ruler of Iken) and his second son Ezuwarha (who had become the ruler of Iyowa) became rivals and ended up poisoning each other causing Ewuare to go into significant mourning. In his sorrow, Ewuare passed a law prohibiting sex in the kingdom for three years which resulted in many members of the kingdom migrating to other areas. Ewuare overturned the law but because few migrants returned, he told all neighboring states to refuse to give entry to his citizens and developed the scarification practice to allow clear identification of their citizens.

== Contact with the Portuguese ==
Ewuare was the Oba of the Benin empire when the Portuguese explorer Ruy de Sequeira arrived in 1472. It is unclear whether he went into the city, but contacts between the Portuguese and the Oba were initiated. This established limited trade between the two empires, to be expanded greatly starting in the 1480s. The king of Portugal developed a close alliance with Oba Esigie, who was the first Oba of Benin to have spoken Portuguese.

== Arts and celebration ==
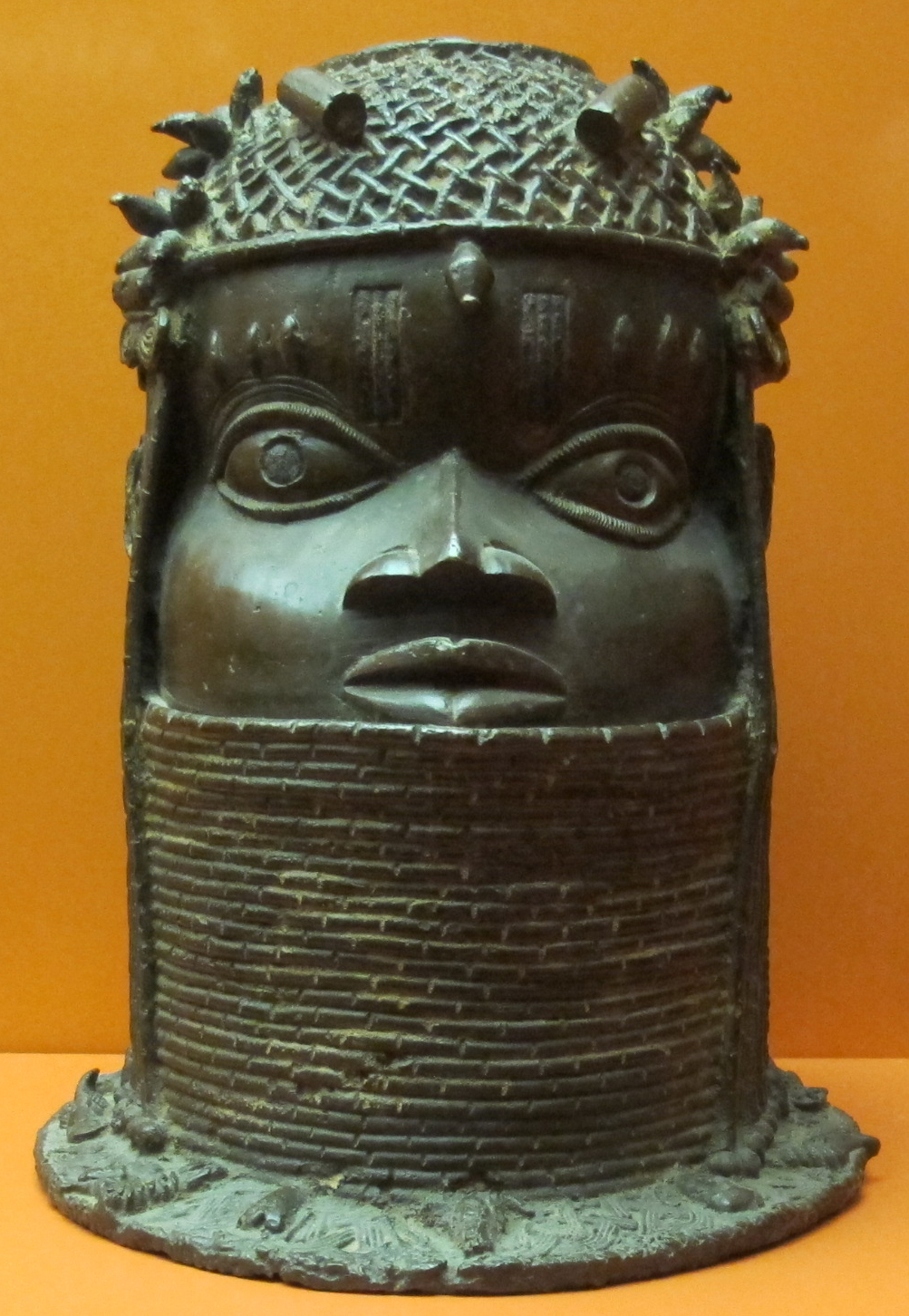
A Benin Bronze head for display at a shrine to the Obas, a tradition started under Ewuare

Ewuare greatly expanded the arts in Benin during his reign and was aided greatly in this through increased trade. Ewuare is generally credited with expanding ivory and wood carving in the empire and the creation of Bronze heads for shrines to deceased Obas. In addition, Ewuare began many of the royal decoration traditions involving coral.

In both folktales and artistic representations, Ewuare is considered someone with significant magical powers. His herbal and magical knowledge is attested to in a number of significant art work from the era. Crucial in this is the creation during Ewuare of the Igue festival, which was originally celebrated as a festival to renew his magical powers. One oral history says that the date of the Igue festival was set initially to the marriage between Ewuare and a wife named Ewere. He is also said to have founded the Ugie Erha Ọba festival which honored the Obas.

== Death and lineage ==
Details about his death are not generally known but Egharevba says that he was buried at Esi, near the town of Edo (Benin City). His first remaining son, Ezoti, died from assassination and his second son, Olua, ruled for a short period and was replaced when the uzama revolted. His third son, Ozolua became Oba around 1483 and ruled until 1514. The royal lineage from Ewuare would continue for multiple generations.
