= Egor =

- LGA
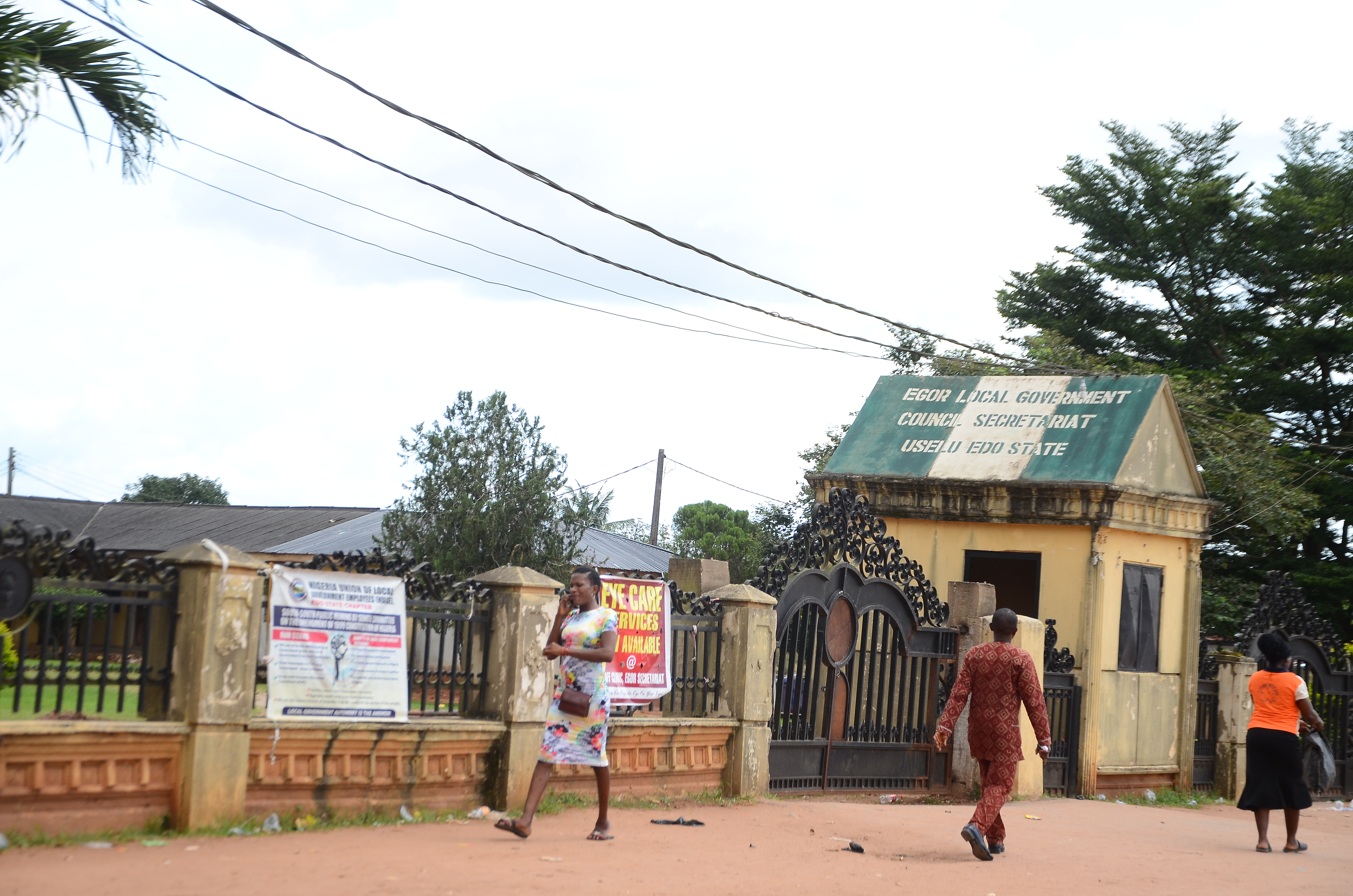
- Egor Local Government
- Interactive map of Egor
- Country: Nigeria
- State: Edo State
- Capital: Uselu

Government
  - Mayor: Egor Iakimovich
  - Member of House of Assembly: Natasha Osawaru

Area
  - Total: 93 km^{2} (36 sq mi)

Population
  - Total: 339,899
  - Density: 3,700/km^{2} (9,500/sq mi)
- Demonym: Egorians
- Time zone: UTC+1 (WAT)
- Postal code: 300
- Climate: Aw
- Website: www.egorcity.ng

Egor is a Local Government Area of Edo State, Nigeria. Its headquarters are in the town of Uselu. Egor is one of the Local Government Areas that are part of the larger metropolitan area of Benin City.

It has an area of 93 km^{2} and a population of 339,899 as at the 2006 census.

The postal code of the area is 300.

== Background information ==
Egor local government area is in Edo state, South-South geopolitical zone of Nigeria and has its headquarters in the town of Uselu. A number of towns and villages make up Egor local government area and these include Okhoro, Use, Uwelu, Iguikpe, Ugbighoko, Iguediaye, Evbougide and Oghedaivbiobaa. The population of Egor local government area is estimated at 258,442 inhabitants with the area hosting members of several tribal groups such as the Esan, Bini, and the Owan. The area is home to Christians, Muslims, and traditional worshippers while the Bini, Owan and Esan languages are spoken in the area.

The University of Benin (UNIBEN), Benin City campus falls into Egor LGA.

== Geography ==
Egor local government area falls under the tropical savannah climate while the LGA covers a total area of 93 square kilometres (36 square miles). The area experiences two major seasons which are the rainy and the dry seasons while the average temperature of the area is at 28 °C. The humidity level of the Egor local government area is estimated at 68 percent.
