= Ozolua =

Oba of Benin (1483 AD – 1504 AD)

- Oba of Benin
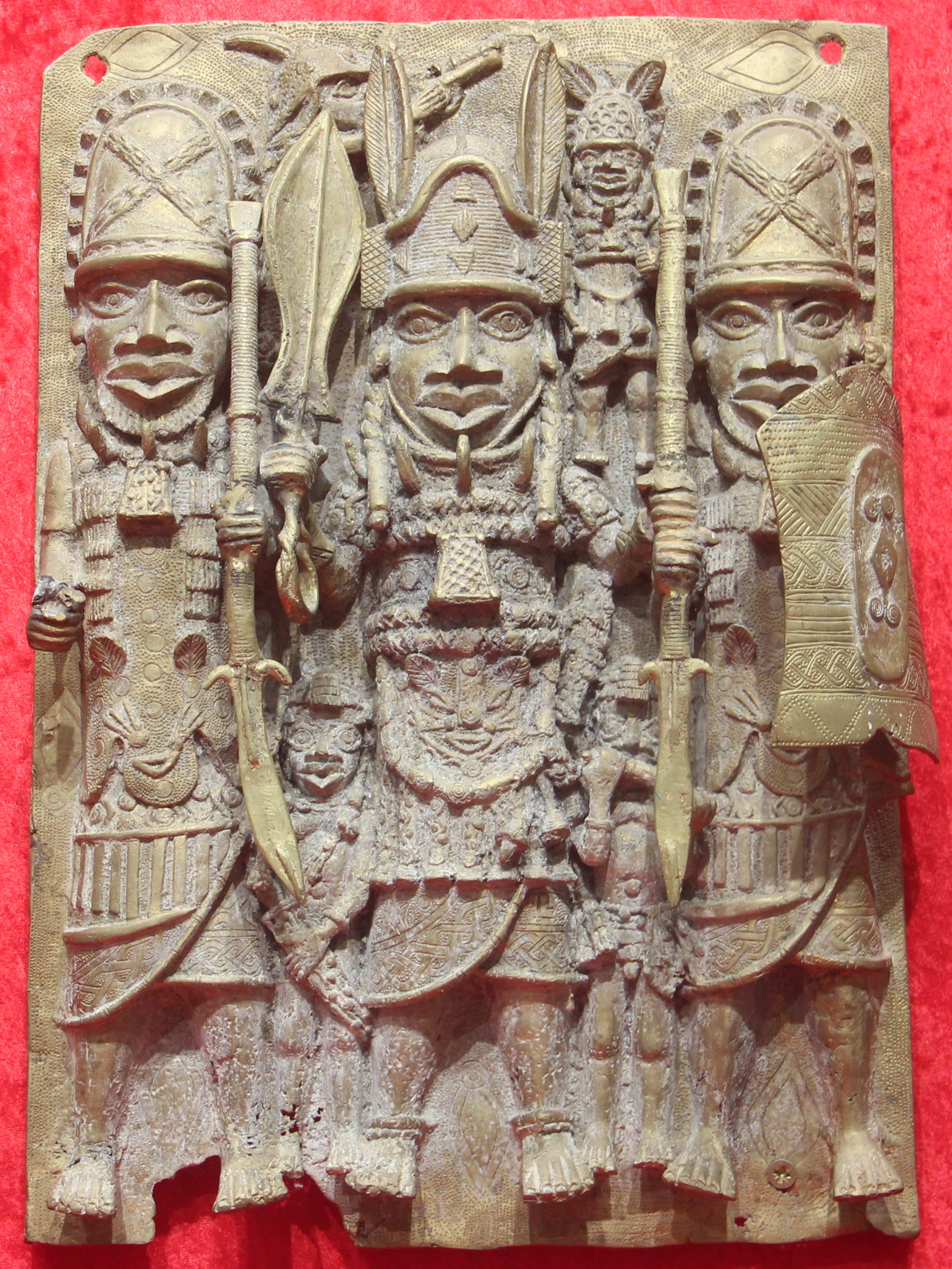
- Oba Ozolua preparing for war Museum of Black Civilisations, Dakar

Oba of Benin
- Reign: 1483 AD – 1504 AD
- Predecessor: Olua
- Successor: Esigie
- Died: 1504; Benin, from Owo war
- Spouse: Idia; Ohonmi
- House: Eweka I
- Father: Ewuare

Ozolua, originally known as Prince Okpame, was the fifteenth Oba of the Kingdom of Benin who reigned from c. 1483 AD – c. 1504 AD. He greatly expanded the Kingdom through warfare and increased contact with the Portuguese Empire, and was later called Ozolua n'Ibaromi, meaning Ozolua the Conqueror in Edo. He was an important Oba in the history of the Kingdom of Benin and retains importance in the folklore and celebrations of the region.

== History ==
Prince Okpame was the third and the youngest son of Ewuare who had significantly expanded the Kingdom of Benin during his reign from 1440 until 1473. Following the death of Ewuare, his eldest surviving son, Esi, was assassinated by a poison arrow at his coronation and his second oldest son, Olua, ruled with significant domestic dissent for seven years. After a short-lived rule of the kingdom by a collection of chieftains, Prince Okpame was named the Oba in 1483 after a three-year interregnum and took the name Ozolua.

His rule was defined largely by significant military expansion of the Kingdom of Benin. This included a successful attack against the Kingdom of Owo. While historical accounts of the battle differ, the result left Owo with its independence while still requiring that it pay tribute to Benin. In diplomatic exchanges with the Portuguese, he claimed to have been victorious in over 200 battles. These victories earned him the title Ozolua n'Ibarmoi, meaning Ozolua the Conqueror in Edo, and in statues and artwork he is often displayed as a great warrior.

It is difficult to date the alleged migrations from Benin, but there is a strong belief that the founder of Ora was a son of Oba Ozolua, who was reigning in 1485. The founders of several other tribes are said to have come at the same time.

Although limited trade and contact with the Portuguese had begun under his father Ewuare, the contact expanded significantly under Ozolua with Portuguese explorer John Alfonso d'Aveiro entering the capital Benin City in 1485 and accompanying Ozolua, although not participating, in war. Ozolua was intrigued by the possibilities of firearms for expansion of the kingdom but was informed by d'Aveiro that firearm trade was only possible with Christian allies of the Portuguese. As a result, Ozolua sent an ambassador to Portugal in the early 1500s to propose missionary activity in the kingdom and a royal conversion to Christianity in exchange for trade in firearms (at least one source indicates that he himself went to Portugal at some point). The Portuguese did not agree, but did send a group of missionaries to the kingdom in 1514. The missionaries soon left, as the kingdom was not interested in Christianity unless this was coupled to the facilitation of trade in firearms.

== Succession ==
The end of Ozolua's reign is bound with a number of important folktales in the region. It is known that he had two sons, Esigie and Arhuahan and that at the end of his reign there was a war regarding royal succession between the two brothers and Esigie became the new Oba of the Benin Kingdom. One popular story holds that in his old age, Ozolua mistakenly named his son Arhuahan the ruler of Udo (a small village in the Kingdom) rather than the ruler of Edo (or Benin City, the capital of the Kingdom). Regardless, the confusion brings the two sons into warfare. According to the tale, Arhuahan brings together a substantial force and with significant confidence tells the people remaining in his city that if he fails to be victorious they should throw every possession of his into the nearby lake. As his army pushes to Benin City, the resident of the city and Esigie's army flee to avoid battle. Arhuahan returns disappointed that he did not have the chance at victory and the villagers seeing his dejected return assume the worst and throw his possessions into the lake, he follows his possessions never to be seen again.

Although sources agree on the general date of the end of his reign at 1504, they disagree on the date of death. Hastings claims that he was deposed in 1504 and assassinated by military leaders when the promise of firearms did not materialize. Most other sources date his death from natural causes to 1520.

== See also ==
- Ewuare
- Benin City

Ozolua Oba of Benin Born: Unknown Died: 1504
Regnal titles
Preceded by Olua	Oba of Benin; 1480 AD – 1504 AD	Succeeded by Esigie
