= Oba of Benin =

Traditional ruler of the Edo people

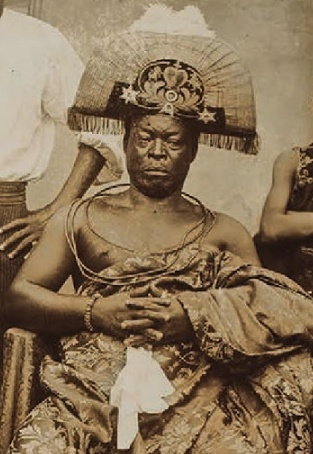
Ovonramwen, the last sovereign Oba of Benin (r. 1888–1897)

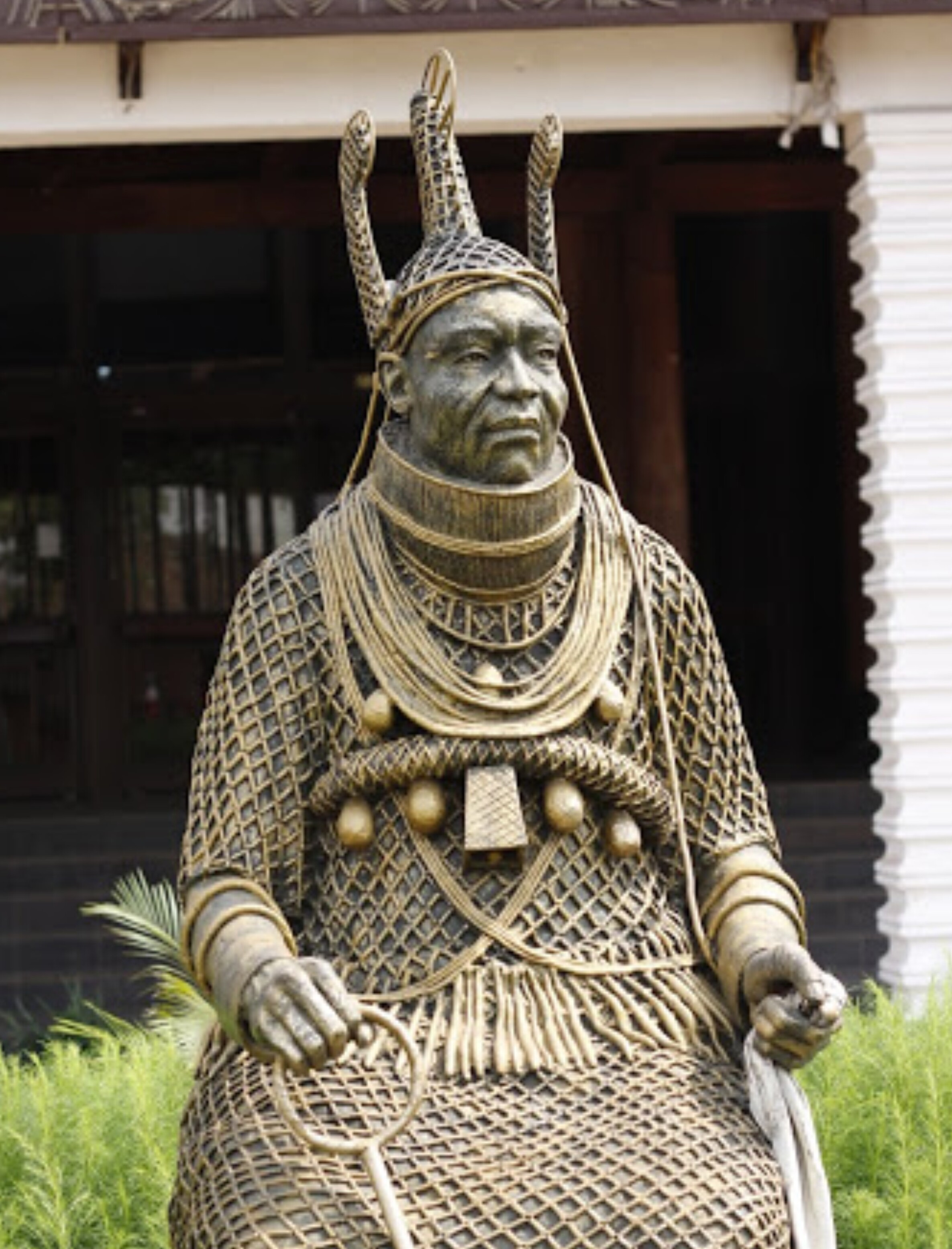
Oba of Benin Regalia

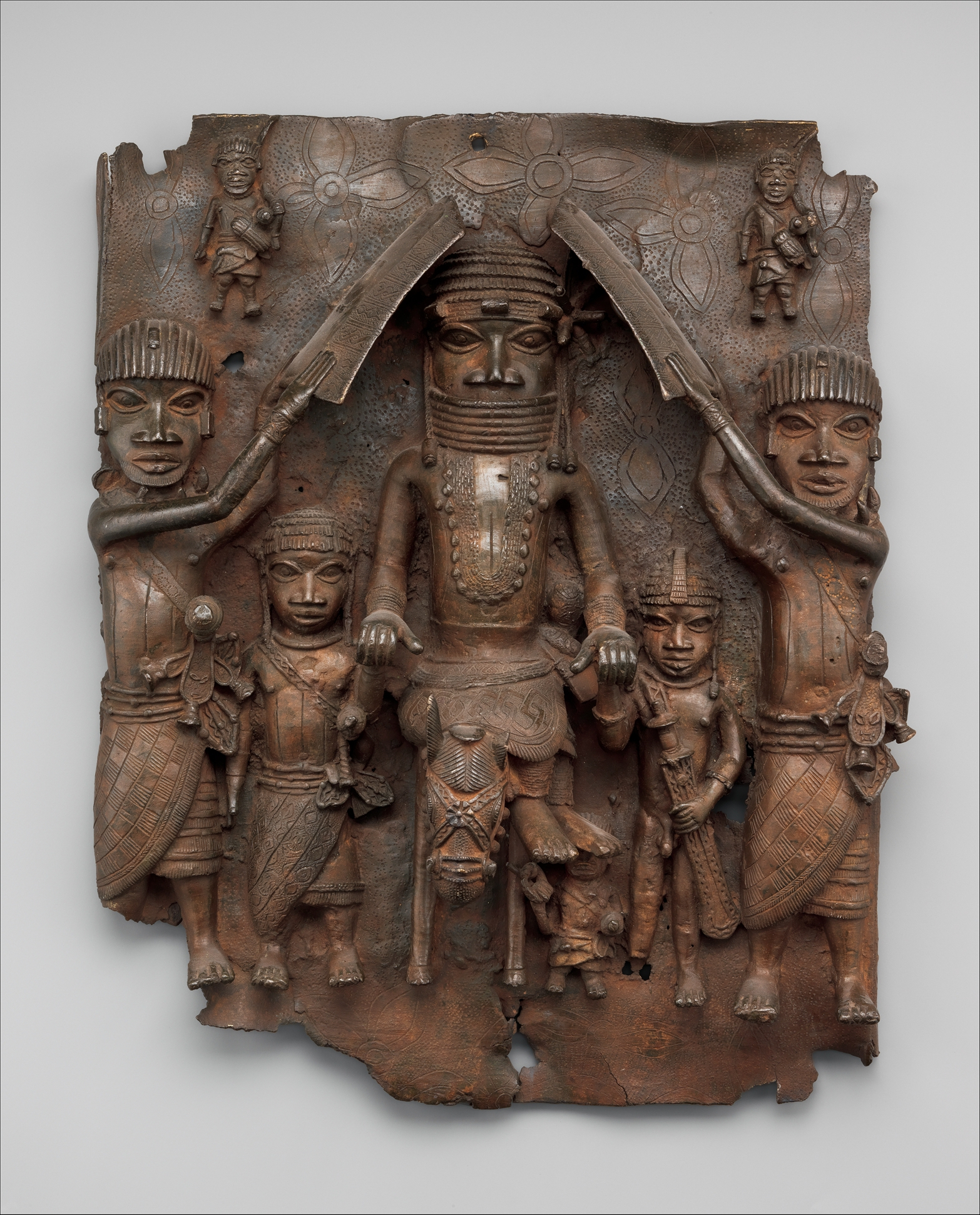
An Oba on horseback with attendants from 16th century

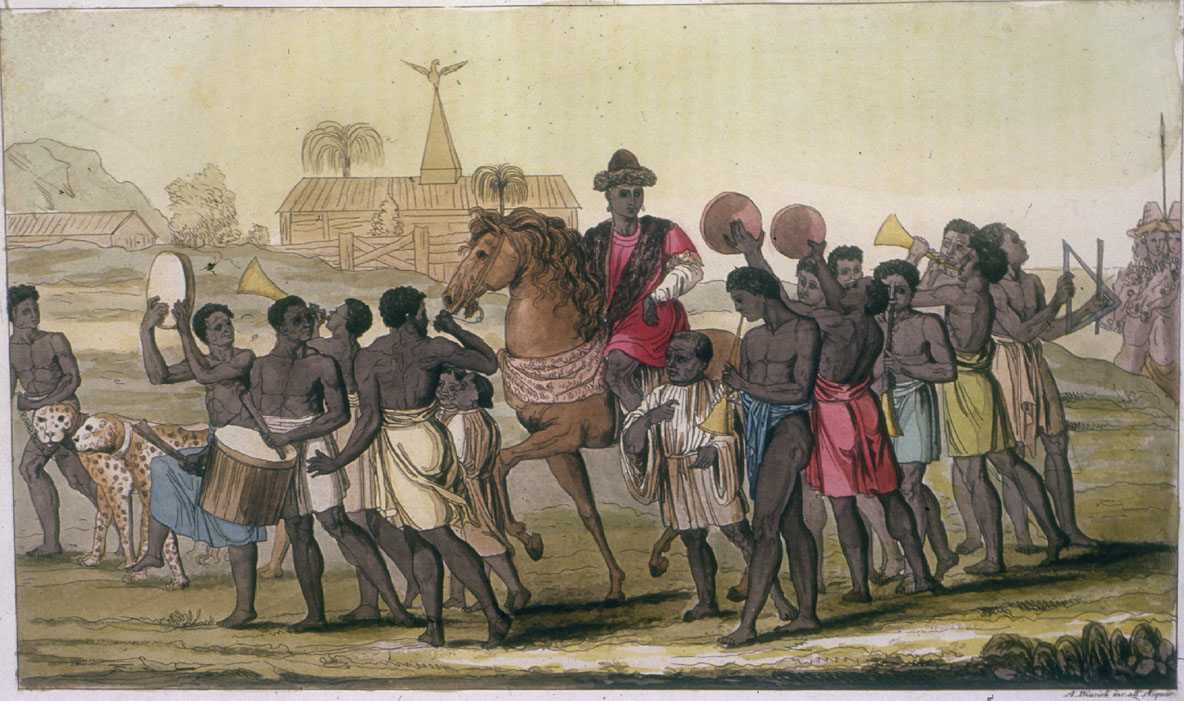
An Oba of Benin from the late 17th century

The Oba ('king') of the Kingdom of Benin is the traditional ruler and the custodian of the culture of the Edo people and all Edoid people. The then Kingdom of Benin (not to be confused with the modern-day and unrelated Republic of Benin, which was then known as Dahomey) has continued to be mostly populated by the Edo (also known as Benin ethnic group). The dynasty is called the "Oba dynasty", after its first Oba ruler, Eweka I, around 12th century AD, and was preceded by the Ogiso monarchy.

In 1897, a British military force of approximately 1,200 men under the command of Sir Harry Rawson mounted the Benin punitive Expedition. The force was dispatched in retaliation to the ambush of a British party, at Ugbine village near Gwato on 4 January 1897 by a group of Benin soldiers who were acting without orders from the Oba; the ambush had led to the deaths of all but two of the British party. The British force captured Edo, the capital of the Kingdom of Benin, sacking and burning the city while forcing the reigning Oba, Ovonramwen, into a six-month exile. The expeditionary force consisted of both indigenous soldiers and British officers based in colonial-era Nigeria. Numerous artworks (collectively known as the Benin Bronzes) looted from the city palace were sold off to defray the costs of the expedition. Ovonramwen died in 1914, his throne never having been restored to him. His son, grandson, and now his great-grandson have preserved their title and status as traditional rulers in modern-day Nigeria.

== List of Obas ==
=== Pre-Imperial Benin (1180–1440) ===
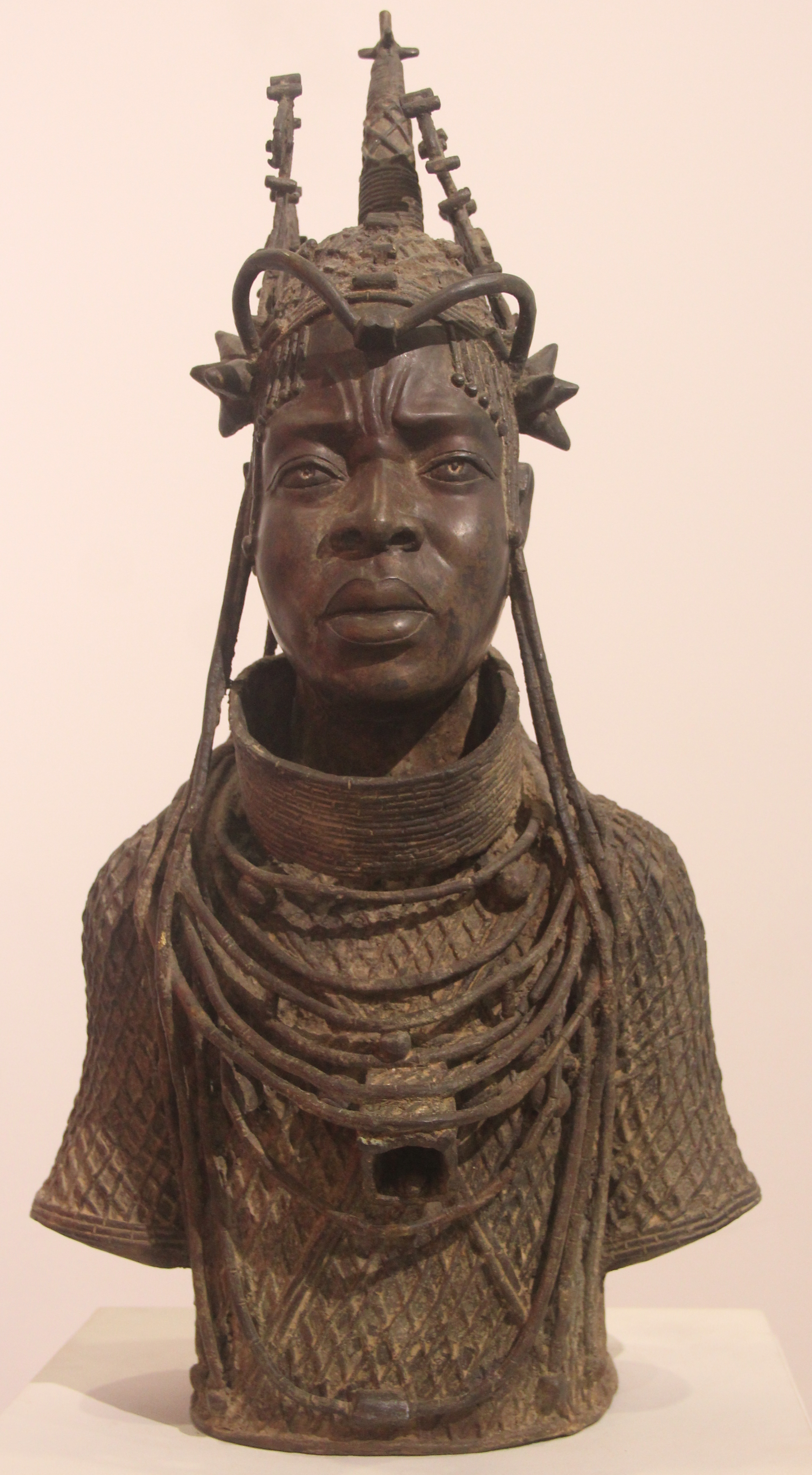
Oba Oguola. Museum of Black Civilisations, Dakar (modern sculpture)

- Eweka I (1200–1235)
- Uwakhuahen (1235–1243)
- Ehenmihen (1243–1255)
- Ewedo (1255–1280)
- Oguola (1280–1295)
- Edoni (1295–1299)
- Udagbedo (1299–1334)
- Ohen (1334–1370)
- Egbeka (1370–1400)
- Orobiru (1400–1430)
- Uwaifiokun (1430–1440)

=== Imperial Benin (1440–1897) ===
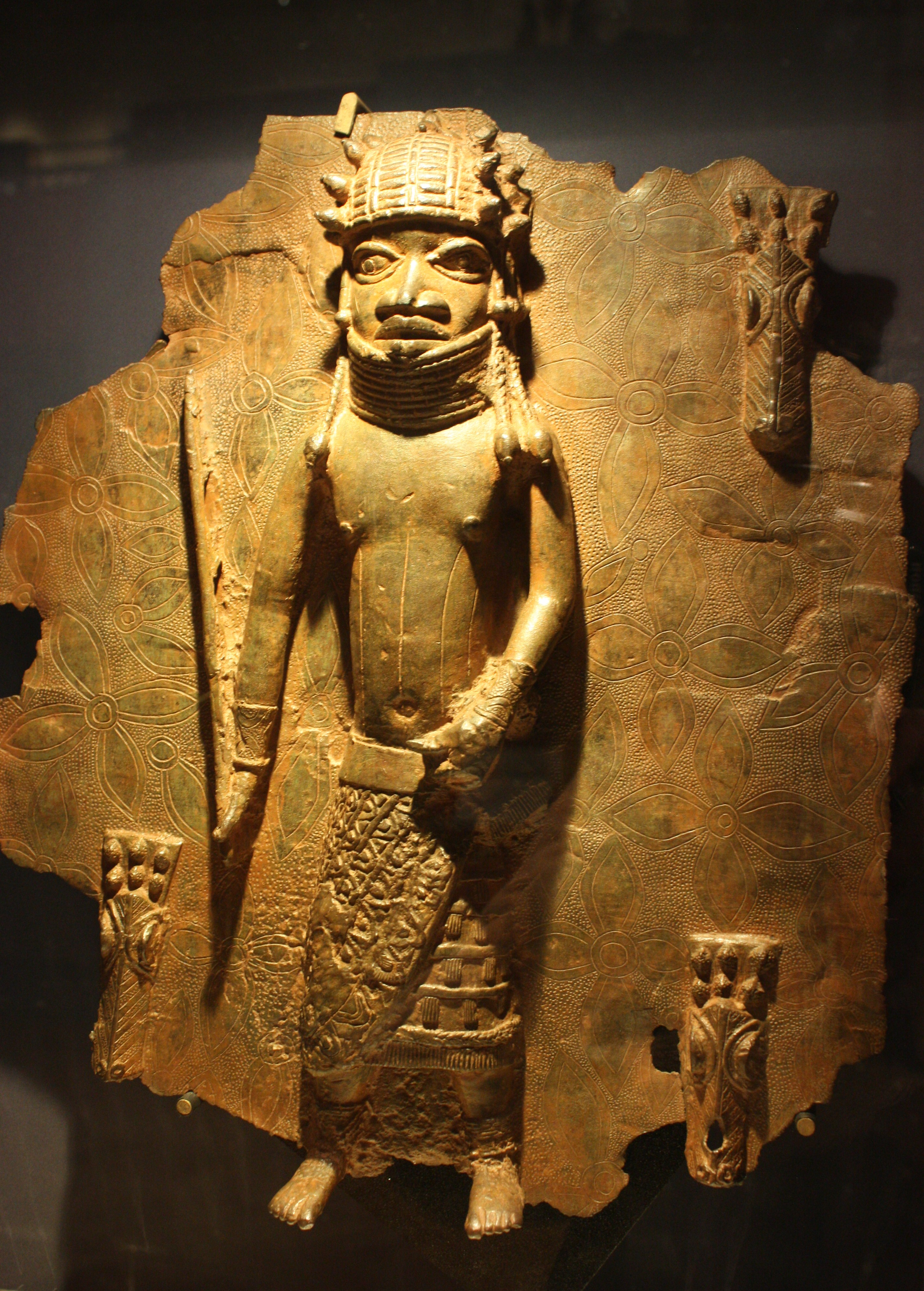
Orhogbua

There is some uncertainty in the dates of the reigns of some of the earlier warrior kings

- Ewuare the Great (1440–1473)
- Ezoti (Reigned for 14 days)
- Olua (1473–1480)
- Ozolua (1483–1504)
- Esigie (1504–1550)
- Orhogbua (1550–1578)
- Ehengbuda (1578–1606)
- Ohuan (1606–1641)
- Ohenzae (1641–1661)
- Akenzae (1661–1669)
- Akengboi ( 1669–1675)
- Ahenkpaye (1675–1684)
- Akengbedo (1684–1689)
- Oroghene (1689–1700)
- Ewuakpe (1700–1712)
- Ozuere (1712–1713)
- Akenzua I (1713–1735)
- Eresoyen (1735–1750)
- Akengbuda (1750–1804)
- Obanosa (1804–1816)
- Ogbebo (1816–1816) (Reigned for eight months)
- Osemwende (1816–1848)
- Adolo (1848–1888)
- Ovonramwen N'Ogbaisi (1888–1914)

=== Post-Imperial Benin ===
- Eweka II (1914–1933)
- Akenzua II (1933–1978)
- Erediauwa (1979–2016)
- Ewuare II (2016–present)

== See also ==
- Iyoba of Benin
- Ogiso
- Akenzua II
