= Afemai people =

Ethnic group in Edo State, Nigeria

Afemai
Total population
- ~1,530,000 (est.) (2025)

Regions with significant populations
- Nigeria
- Etsakọ (West, Central, East): ~705,000 (est.)
- Owan (West, East): ~405,000 (est.)
- Akoko-Edo: ~420,000 (est.)

Languages
- Afemai

Religion
- Christianity(~40-45%), Islam(~50-55%), African traditional religion(~5%)

The Afemai people (also spelled Afenmai) are a major ethnic group in the northern region of Edo State, Nigeria. They are historically linked to the Kingdom of Benin and are part of the Edoid ethnolinguistic family.

The Afemai occupy six local government areas (LGAs) of Edo State: Etsako West (with headquarters in Auchi), Etsako Central, Etsako East, Owan East, Owan West and Akoko Edo. These collectively constitute the Edo North senatorial district.

The Etsakọ, Owan, and Akoko-Edo peoples are collectively referred to as the Afenmai (though the latter is sometimes grouped separately). The people and region they reside in were formerly called Kukuruku by the British colonial administration, allegedly in reference to a rallying battle cry; this term is now considered derogatory, and the people induced the government to change the name to Afenmai (see Kukuruku Hills § Name for further context). The Afenmai Division was broken up into the modern six LGAs post-colonialism. Though no longer an official administrative designation, the region may still be referred to as Afenmailand (or Afemai land). The Afenmai have close linguistic, cultural, and historical relationships.

== Name and etymology ==
The Afemai are also known as the Afenmai, Etsako, Etsakor, Iyekhee, or Yekhee people. In Benin, they are also known as Ivbiosakon or Ivbiesakon people. The name Afemai means "we are united", while Etsako means "those who file their teeth", referring to an old practice of tooth sharpening; likewise, the Benin name Ivbiesakon means "children of those who file their teeth".

Owan was derived from the largest and longest river in the area which is known as Onwan/Owan. Onwanvbua/Owanbua was abbreviated as Onwan/Owan, which means "one who makes merry in affluence".

== Language ==
The Afenmai language is a Ghotou-Uneme-Yekhee language, belonging to the North-Central branch of Edoid languages. Afemai is closely related to Edo.

Afemai has several documented dialects:

- Auchi (Yekhee)
- Avainwu (Fugar)
- Aviele
- Ekperi
- Ivhiadaobi
- South Ibie (South Ivbie)
- Uwepa-Uwano (Weppa Wano)
- Uzanu, Anegbette, Udochi, Imiava (Uneme)
- Uzairue
- Owan
- Okpella/Okpekpe/North Ibie (Ivie)

== History ==
Afemai is made of several kingdoms and clans (large villages/townships ruled traditionally by monarchs) and many of them seem to have their own oral history versions of the origin of Afemai as well as claims to its starting point in history. Historical accounts claimed that they migrated from Benin, during the rule of Oba Ewuare. The title Ewuare (Oworuare), means "all is well" or "the trouble has ceased". The title symbolizes an epoch of reconciliation, reconstruction and the return of peace among the warring factions in Benin between 1435-1440 AD.

Shortly after this critical period of war, Akalaka and his two sons Ekpeye and Ogba migrated further southeast to first settle at Ula-Ubie, and subsequently other groups moved out of Benin City and migrated north. However, it has recently become clear that there were people living in Afemailand prior to the migration from Benin City.

The local tradition of origin often traces their migration from Benin, which many oral traditionalists attribute to have happened sometime between the 13th and 15th centuries. It is believed their ancestors settled in South Ibie before groups started moving to populate the other area they occupied like the Weppa Wanno lands, Okpella land, Uzairue, etc. Many Owan communities trace their origins to migrations from Benin at different times. Historical accounts, including those by Chief Jacob U. Egharevba, suggest that Omorodion, popularly known as Odion among the people of Uwokha, was one of the sons of Oba Eweka I. Following a succession dispute after the demise of Oba Eweka I, Omorodion left Benin City and established Uwokha, a name derived from the Benin word "Uwoha," meaning "bush." Over time, the name evolved into Uwokha or Uokha.

== Administration and government ==
Administratively, the Etsakọ occupy three local government areas of Edo State. These are: Etsako East, Etsako West and Etsako Central, with Agenebode, Auchi, and Fugar as their administrative headquarters respectively.

Owan is made up of two local government areas: Owan East and Owan West, including many clans; notable amongst them are: Ihievbe, Emai people, Iuleha land, Ora, Igue, Uokha, Otuo, Ikhin, Ivbi-Mion, Ikao, Ivbi-adaobi, Ozalla, Uzebba etc.

The Afemais do not have a central traditional ruler, but some of the prominent traditional institutions and rulers in Afemai land are the Okumagbe of Weppa Wanno (Agenebode), Ogieneni of Uzairue (Jattu), Aidonogie of south Ibie, Otaru of Auchi, Oba of Agbede, Otaru of Igarra, Ukor of Ihievbe, Oliola of Anegbette, Okumagbe of Iuleha clan, Okuopellagbe of Okpella, oghie avhianwu of Avhianwu clan etc. Afemai have produced many personalities in both national and international levels.

Tourist attractions, which span the expanse of Afemai, are exemplified by the Ise Lake in Agenebode (Weppa Wanno clan) Etsakor East, the Ososo Hills (featured in an edition of Gulder Ultimate search), the famous Kukuruku Hills and the Somorika Hills in Akoko Edo. Somorika Hills consist of an extended expanse of hills crowned by massive boulders perched precariously on the summits of hills and alongside seemingly inadequate locations on the sides.

Some of the most important towns/clans in Afemai land are Agenebode(Weppa-Wanno), Weppa, Oshiolo, Emokwemhe Iviagbapue, Auchi, Ihievbe, Afuze, Warrake, Iviukwe, South Ibie, Agbede, Sabongida Ora, Igarra, Ekperi, Jattu, Fugar, Aviele, Okpella, Uneme Ehrunrun, Uneme Osu, Iviukhua, Ososo, Uzanu, Uzebba, Iviukhua, Weppa, Okpella, Okpekpe, Somorika, Ogbona etc.

The autonomous clans, towns, villages and kingdoms in Afemai land are currently administratively arranged as follows under the current six local government areas:

- Etsako East LGA, Agenebode:

Agenebode, Oshiolo, Iviagbapue, Imiakebu, Afana, Imiegba, Itsukwi, Emokweme, Ekwothor, Iviukhua, Okpella, Okpekpe, Iviebua, Ibie, Weppa, Uzanu

- Etsako Central LGA, Fugar:

Fugar, Ekperi, Ogbona, Anegbette, Udochi,Iraokhor

- Estako West LGA, Auchi:

Auchi, South Ibie, Agbede, Awain Community( Ewora, Eware, Ibvioba, Ama, Idegun, etc.) Jattu, Afashio, Ayogwiri, Aviele, Iyorah, Irekpai

- Owan East LGA, Afuze

Afuze, Warrake, Igue, Ihievbe, Ikao, Ivbi-Mion, Ive-Ada-Obi, Otuo and Uokha

- Owan West LGA, Sabongida Ora:

Sabongida Ora, Iuleha Clan

- Akoko Edo LGA, Igarra:

Igarra, Ibillo, Uneme Osu, Uneme Ehrunrun, Ososo, Somorika,

Aviawun (Iviawu) is one of the popular clans in Afemai. It comprises 1 Unone 2 Arua 3 Ogbona 4 Iriakhor

Awun is the father of Unone Arua Ogbona Iriakhor and Awun migrated from Benin Kingdom and settle in the present Fugar. Unone and Arua make up the present Fugar.

== Economy and occupation ==
Etsako land is naturally blessed with arable farmlands, natural minerals, freshwater streams, and rivers including the Niger River, well distributed in every community across the vast plains, valleys, and hills, including mineral-rich mountains that decorate Etsako land. Naturally, Etsako people are traditionally engaged in crop and animal farming, fishery, hunting, and trading in the raw materials and by-products of these industries. While many still engage in the traditional occupation of the people, industrialization and diversification have happened over many centuries. Today, Etsako people are prominently engaged in almost every known trade, occupation, and work in Nigeria and the world.

Etsako people predominantly practice farming with very fertile land that produces groundnut, yam, maize, rice in a large wide range, and cassava. Mineral resources such as Coal, Limestone, Potassium, and precious stones of large commercial quantities are found in Etsako land. Compared to others Edo state, Security in Etsako land is better, and the people greatly host visitors.

== Religion and culture ==
The Etsako people were originally practitioners of the African Traditional Religion. However, with the introduction of Christianity and Islam, many got converted to those religions.

Today, the Etsako people practice traditional religion, Christianity, and Islam. Oghena, Osinegba, Osi, and Oshio are the common words used to refer to God in different communities and dialects of the Etsako people.

== Notable people ==
- Olusegun Olutoyin Aganga, former Minister of Trade, Commerce and Investment
- Gen. George Agbazika Innih, one-time military governor of Bendel and Kwara States,
- Aigboje Aig-Imoukhuede, former CEO, Access Bank PLC and current chairman of the Nigerian Stock Exchange
- Vice Admiral Mike Akhigbe, Vice admiral of the Nigerian Navy, who served as de facto vice president of Nigeria (as Chief of General Staff) under the military, previously served as Chief of Naval Staff, the highest-ranking officer of the Nigerian Navy and as former military governor of Lagos and Ondo State.
- Rt Hon Sir Colonel Tunde Akogun, former Sole administrator for culture and archives, also former House Leader, Federal House of Representatives,
- Grace Alele-Williams, first Nigerian woman to receive a doctorate, first female vice chancellor in Nigeria.
- Senator Francis Alimikhena, former senator of Edo north senatorial district
- Mai Atafo Nigerian fashion tailor
- Yisa Braimoh former senator
- Commander Anthony Ikhazoboh, minister of sports and transport,
- Eng Nathaniel Oyakhire Ilube, one of the first four West Africans to be enlisted in the British Royal Academy, second set of The Nigerian Military School, Zaria, First Nigerian broadcast engineer at BBC who brought BBC to Africa, engineer at Radio Bendel and Bendel television, first General Manager of Edo Broadcasting Service.
- Michael Imoudu, labour union leader and founder of the Nigeria state.
- Francis Abiola Irele, professor of African Studies at Harvard University, Provost at Kwara State University.
- Major-general Abdul Rahman Mamudu, former commander, Nigerian Army Signals Corps and military administrator Gongola State,
- Chief Julius Momo Udochi the first Nigerian ambassador to the United States
- Dele Momodu, owner of Ovasion Magazine
- John Momoh (Chairman/CEO of Channels Television)
- Prince Tony Momoh, former Minister of Information and Culture
- DJ Neptune Nigerian producer and disk jockey
- Aize Obayan, Professor, former vice chancellor of Covenant University, and current Vice Chancellor of Landmark University
- Chief Prudence Ogedengbe - Founder and First President of Afenmai Union UK & Ireland
- J. D. 'Okhai Ojeikere, photographer
- Adams Oshiomhole, past president of the Nigeria Labour Congress, former governor of Edo State, and current serving senator of Edo north senatorial district (the Afemai people).
- Modupe Ozolua, philanthropist
- Mabel Segun, writer and winner of Nigerian Prize for Literature, 2007
- Ambruse Vanzekin, Nigerian goal keeper
- Waje, Nigerian singer, who became famous after being featured on P-Square's 2006 hit track "Do Me"
