= Edo people =

Nigerian ethnic group

Edo
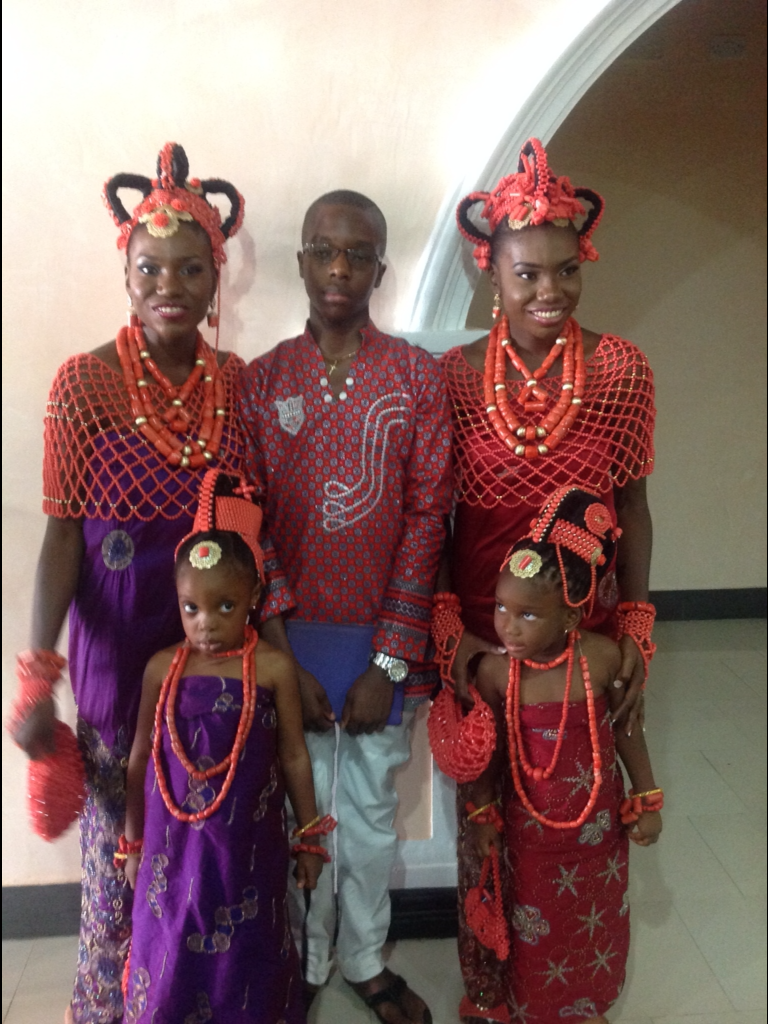
- Edo people in traditional attire

Total population
- 4,777,000

Regions with significant populations
- Edo State

Languages
- Edo and English

Religion
- Predominantly Christianity, minority syncretic with Traditional Religions

Related ethnic groups
- Afemai, Esan, Isoko, Owan, Urhobo, Itsekiri

The Edo people, also referred to as the Benin people, are an Edoid-speaking ethnic group. They are prominently native to the Edo South senatorial district which comprises seven local government areas of Edo State in Nigeria. The Edo people speak the Edo language and are the descendants of the founders of the Benin Kingdom, the Ogiso. Even other Edoid ethnic groups, such as the Esan, the Etsakọ, the Isoko, the Owan and the Urhobo as well as other southern ethnic groups migrated from the Benin kingdom.

The name Benin is a Portuguese corruption, ultimately from the word Ubini, which came into use during the reign of Oba (ruler) Ewuare, c. 1440. Ubini was later corrupted to Bini by the mixed ethnicities living together at the centre; and further corrupted to Benin around 1485, when the Portuguese began trade relations with Oba Ewuare giving them some coral beads, which the Edo people call 'Ivie'.

== History ==
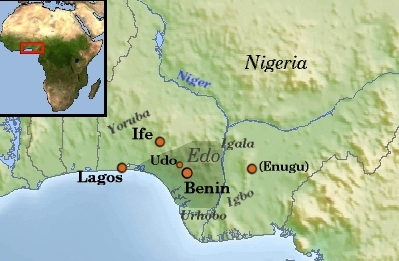
Location of the Edo homeland (dark green) in Nigeria (green)

== Administrative region ==
Edo people can be found in Nigeria's Edo State, which got its name from the primary inhabitants of the region's most notable historical conglomeration, Benin City, which is also the central capital homeland of the Edo people. Edo people also have many related groups in their immediate surroundings also encompassed by the political and administrative borders of Edo state. Most of these groups have traced their history back to the historical city center of the Benin people, Benin City. Examples of such adjacent groups include various Afemai sub-groups, the Esan people of Edo state and the Akoko Edo people situated on the state's northern borders.

Edo state was formerly part of the old Bendel state of early post-colonial Nigeria, also known as the Mid-Western Region, Nigeria. This region's influence and culture reflect those of the Edo, Urhobo, Esan and other Edo related peoples. There are also 18 local government areas in Edo. These are: Akoko Edo, Egor, Esan central, Esan west, Esan south-east, Esan north-east, Igueben, Ikpoba oka, Estako east, Estako west, Estako central, Oredo, Owan East, Owan west, Ovia north-east, Ovia south-west, Uhunmwode and Orhionmwon.

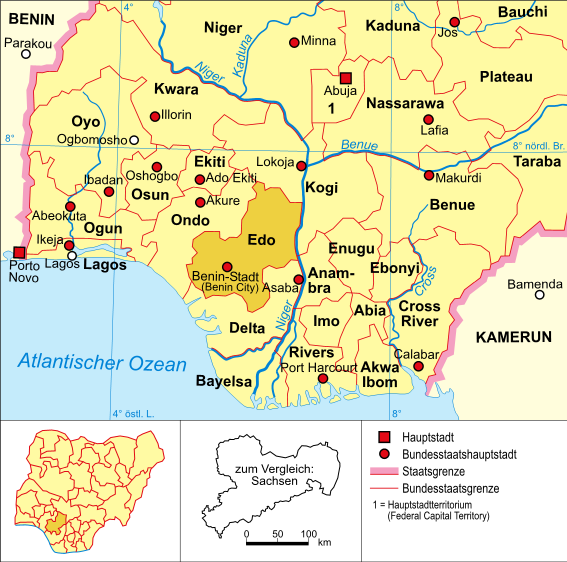
Location of Edo state and Benin City in Nigeria

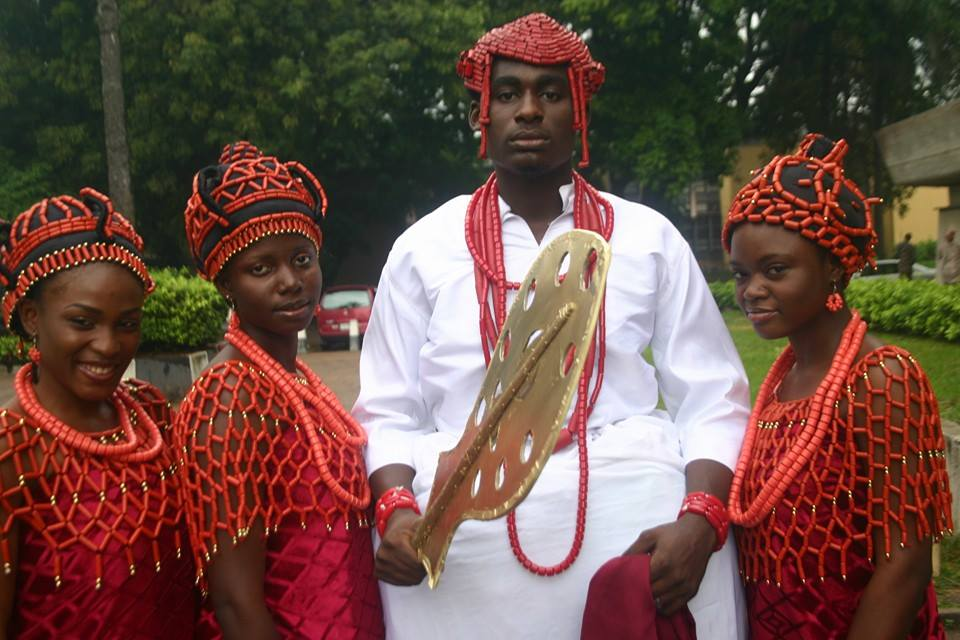
Edo cultural dressing with beaded crowns and outfits

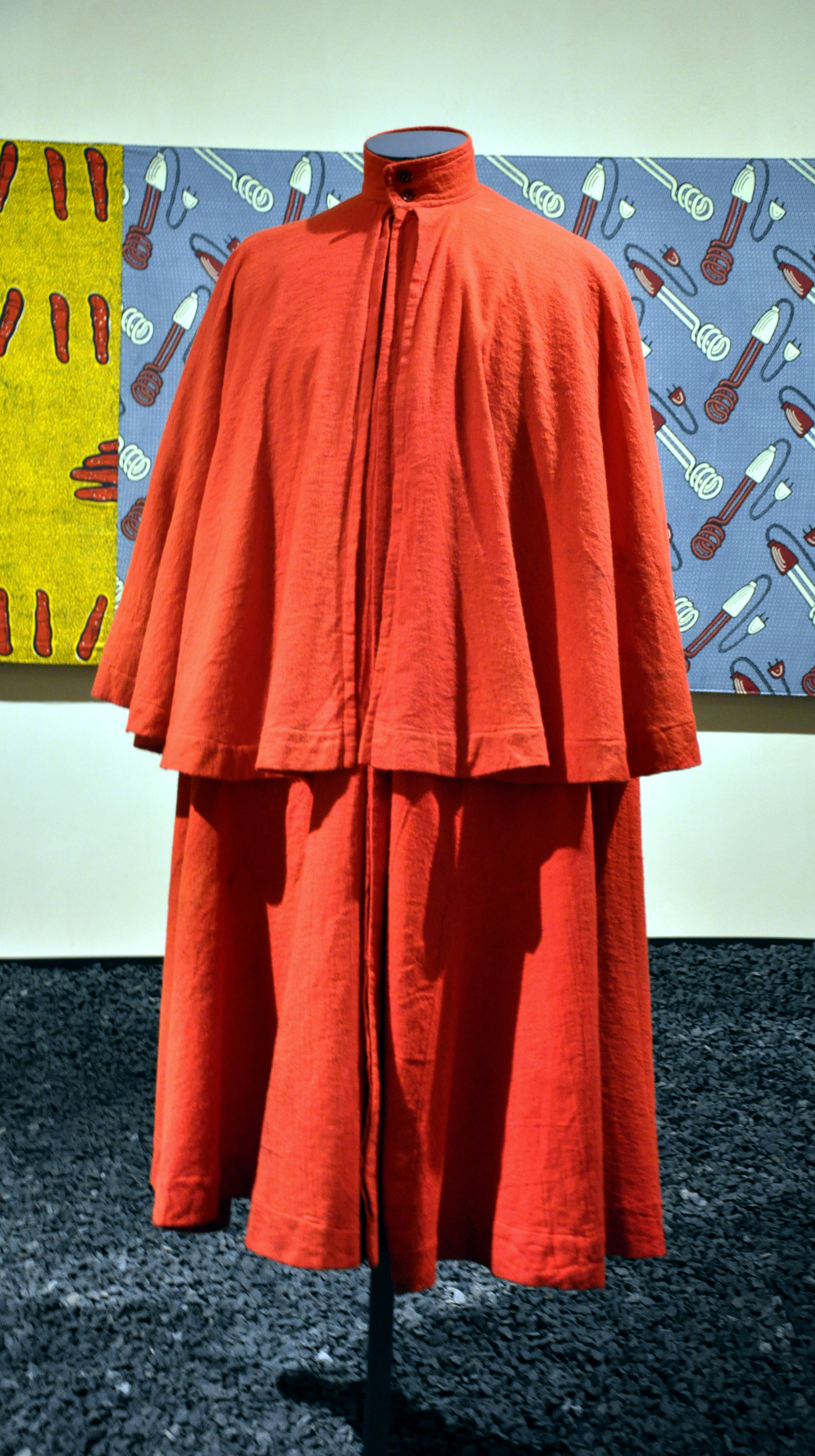
Tunic

== Fashion ==
The Edo people have a rich and flamboyant traditional fashion style. This is usually prominent during ceremonies such as weddings, coronation and the like. When it comes to cultural attire, the Edo people maintain a unique way of dressing. Coral bead accessories are a true passion for Edo women and men. Common attire includes coral beads, anklets, raffia work and so on. The men usually wear a white T-shirt or shirt and above it, a multicolored striped fabric. There are options with other patterns. The choice of headdress depends on the preferences of a man. Some men even prefer to wear black hats as part of their traditional attire.

It is also popular to choose a carved walking stick that makes a groom look like a true gentleman. Wearing a wrapper around the waist is also a tradition for many men.

The cultural attire is usually accompanied by a cap or hat. The caps are often called headdress and are made either of a mesh of coral beads or of fabric.

Women commonly wear wrappers crafted from fabrics like velvet, lace, and George fabric. They also wear a beaded cape or blouse known as the ewu-ivie. Women adorn their necks with coral beads known as ivie-uru and wear the ivie-obo on their hands and beaded earrings. Their handbag is made out of coral beads as well the ekpa-ivie.

== Traditional beliefs ==
In the traditional religion of the Edo, there exists, besides the human world, an invisible world of supernatural beings acting as interceders for the human world. Offerings are made to them in their respective shrines. Osanobua is the creator and Supreme God. His son/daughter Olokun is ruler of all bodies of water and is responsible for the prosperity and fertility of his/her human followers. Another son Ogun, is the patron god of metalworkers. The epithet Osanobua Noghodua means God Almighty. The word Osanobua encompasses a large number of divine principles - including the divine state of being merciful, timeless, goodness, justice, sublimity, and supreme. In the Edo belief system, Osanobua has the divine attributes of omnipresence (orhiole), omniscience (ajoana), and omnipotence (udazi). The Supreme Deity is believed to be present everywhere and at all times. Other traditional deities include Shango the god of thunder and Osun the god of medicine.

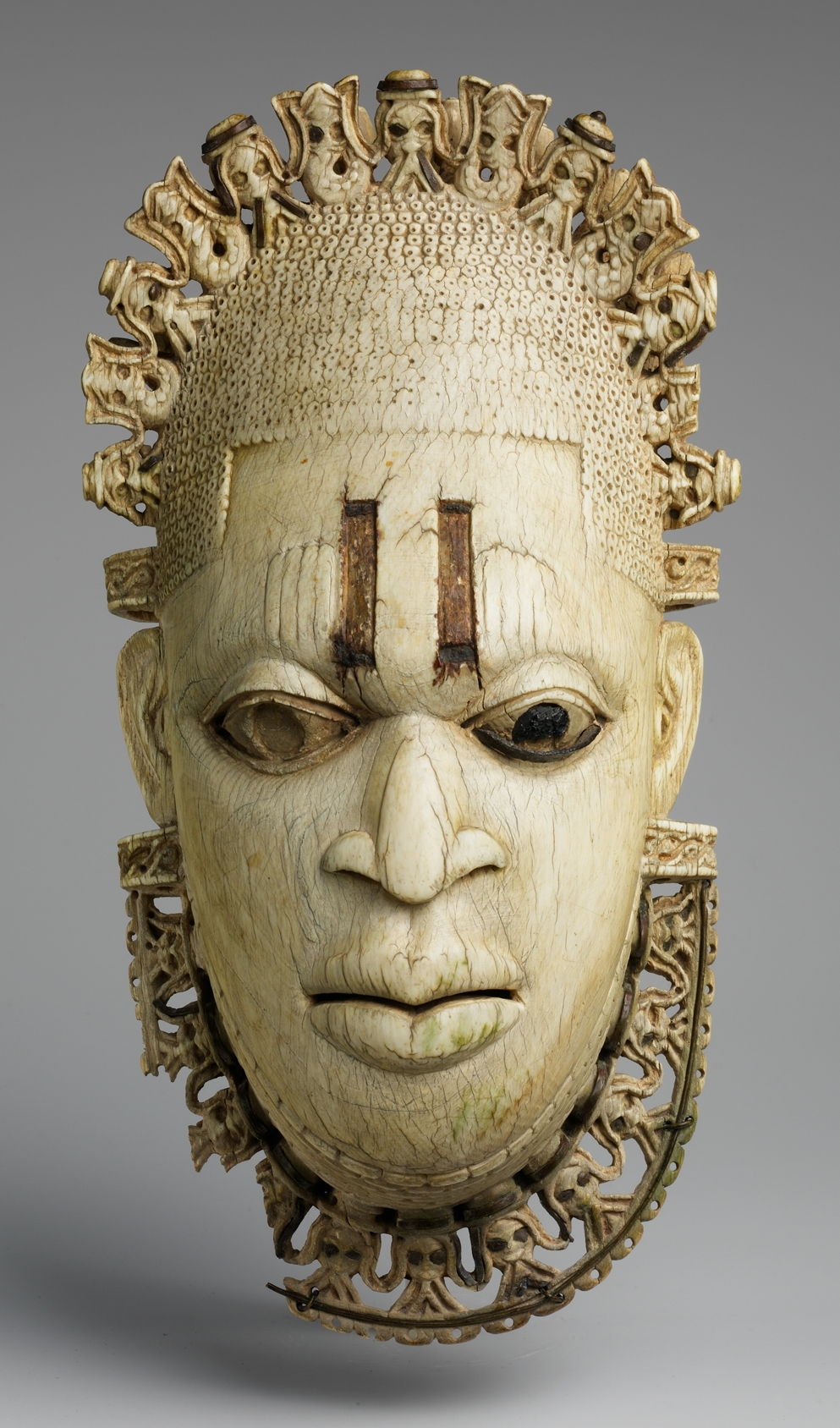
16th century ivory portrait of Queen Mother Idia

== Art and architecture ==
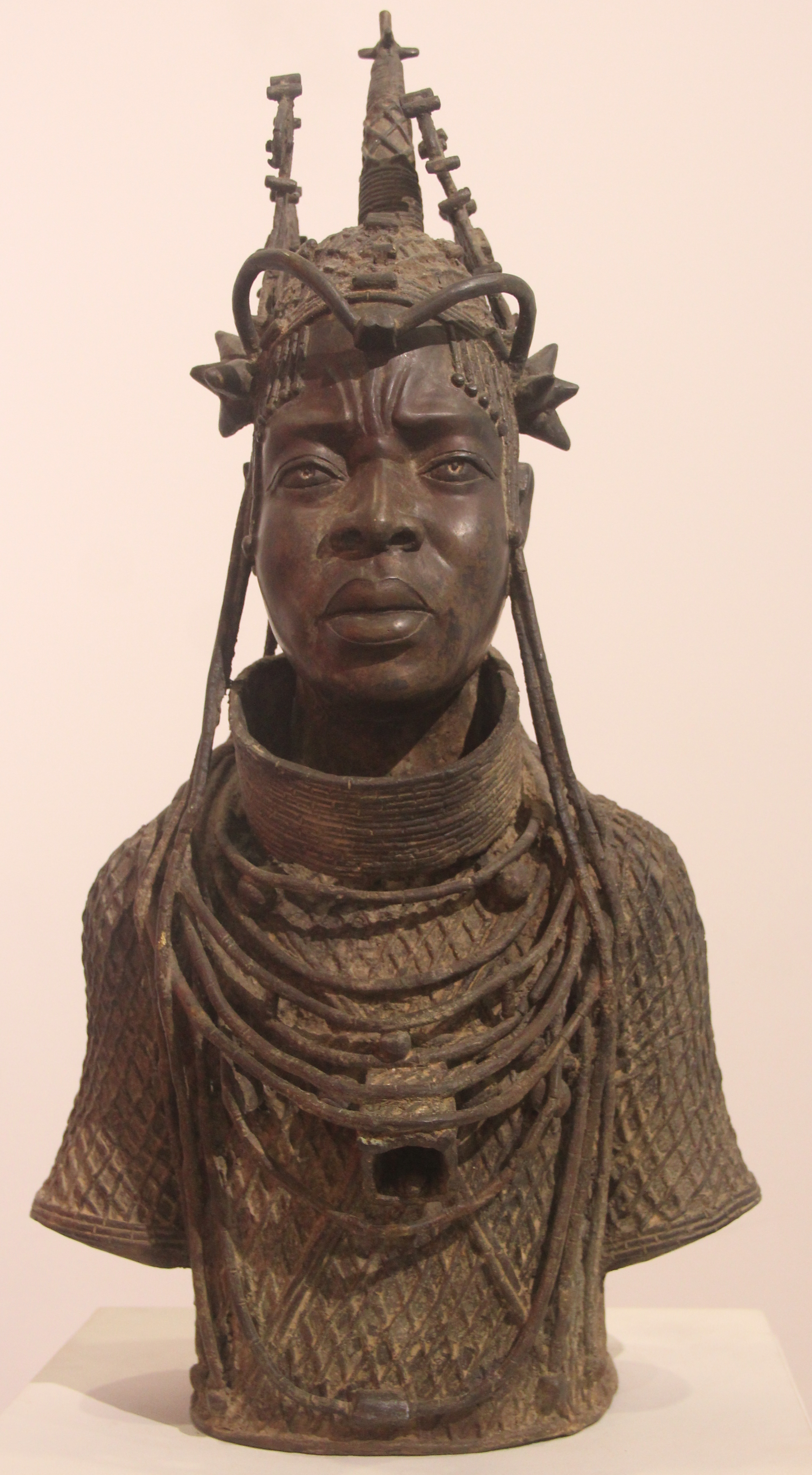
Figure of Oba Oguola, an Edo king

Traditional Edo art consists of widely identifiable sculptures, plaques and masks which reflect various spiritual and historical aspects of their cultural traditions. Some of the notable Edo art pieces include the mask of the Queen Mother Idia and a vast collection of historical Edo art pieces called the Benin Bronzes which can be found not only in Nigeria but further dispersed around the world, including in museums such as New York's Metropolitan Museum of Art.

== Notable Edo people ==
- Ewuare II, the 40th Oba of Benin Kingdom from 2016–present.
- Esther Erediauwa, the first wife of the 39th Oba of Benin kingdom, Oba Erediauwa.
- Victor Uwaifo, musician, writer, sculptor, and musical instrument inventor.
- Peter Odemwingie, professional footballer.
- Charles Novia, film director, producer, screenwriter, actor and social commentator.african l
- Osayuki Godwin Oshodin, former Vice-chancellor of University of Benin.
- Benson Idahosa, evangelist, and founder of the Church of God Mission International.
- Samuel Ogbemudia, politician and former military Governor of the Mid-West State
- John Odigie Oyegun, politician and first national chairman of All Progressives Congress (APC) in Nigeria
- Victor Ikpeba, professional footballer.
- Godwin Obaseki, governor of Edo state (2015 to 2019 under APC, and from 2019 under PDP) and businessman
- Gabriel Igbinedion, Nigeria business man and esama of Benin kingdom.
- Erhabor Emokpae, artists, director
- Mercy Aigbe, is a Nigerian actress and filmmaker
- Guosa Alex Guosa Igbineweka, Guosa Language Evolutionist, Creator: a Nigerian and ECOWAS indigenous zonal lingua-franca
- Abel Guobadia, former Chairman of Nigeria's Independent National Electoral Commission
- Jane Igharo, Nigerian-Canadian writer
- Professor Osasere Orumwense, Vice-Chancellor of University of Benin
- Suyi Davies Okungbowa, African fantasy and speculative fiction author
- Archbishop John Edokpolo, Honourable Minister of Trade and Founder of Edokpolor Grammar School
- Chief Jacob U. Egharevba, a Bini historian and traditional chief
- Kamaru Usman, Nigerian mixed martial artist
- Gbadamasi Agbonjor Jonathan (MC Edo Pikin), Nigerian comedian
- Rema, music artist
- Johnny Drille, music artist
- Shallipopi, music artist
- Boy Spyce, music artist
- Zerrydl, music artist
- Ayo Edebiri, American actress and comedian
- Wisdom Kaye, Nigerian-American model and social media personality

== See also ==
- List of the Ogiso
- Kingdom of Benin
- Oba of Benin
