= 2023 Nigerian presidential election in Edo State =

- 25 February 2023
- Registered: 2,501,081
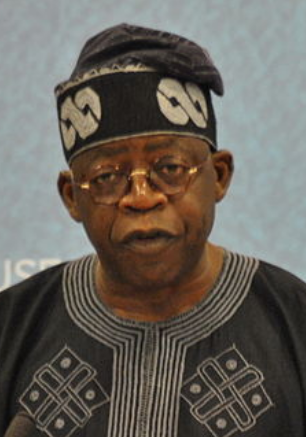

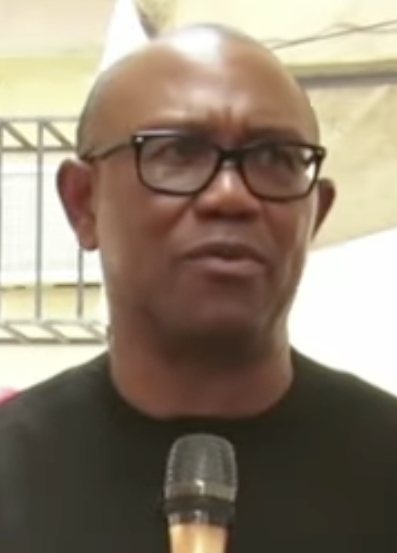

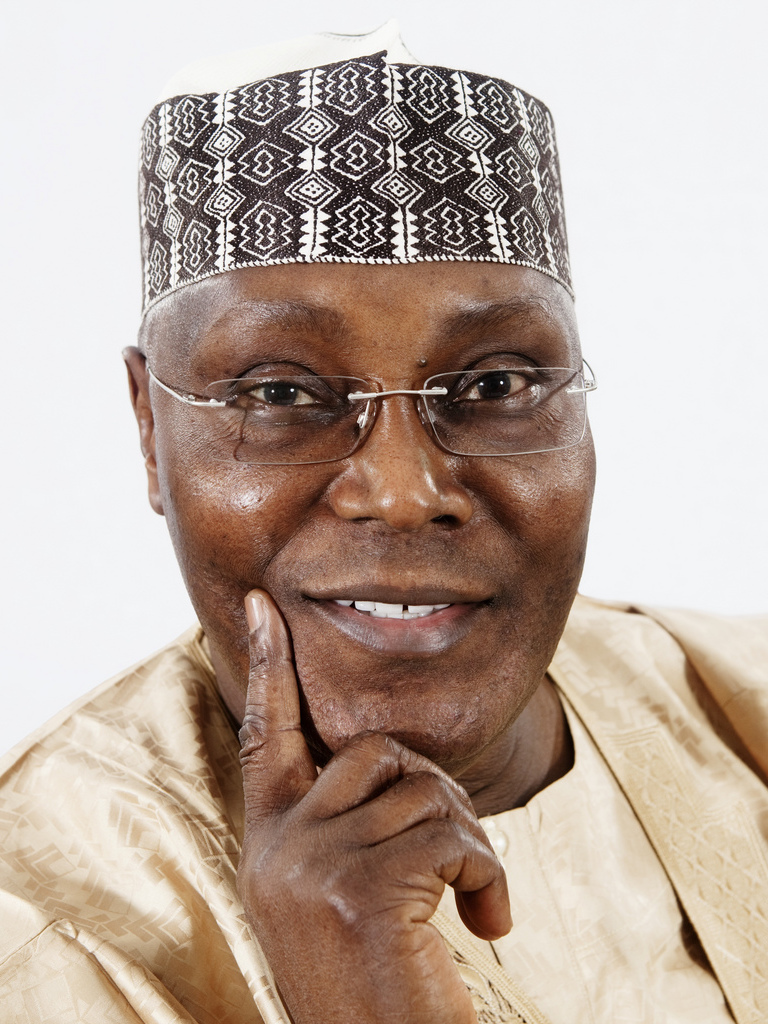
Nominee	Bola Tinubu	Peter Obi
Party	APC	LP
Home state	Lagos	Anambra
Running mate	Kashim Shettima	Yusuf Datti Baba-Ahmed
Nominee	Rabiu Kwankwaso	Atiku Abubakar
Party	New Nigeria Peoples Party	PDP
Home state	Kano	Adamawa
Running mate	Isaac Idahosa	Ifeanyi Okowa
President before election
Muhammadu Buhari
APC
Elected President
TBD

The 2023 Nigerian presidential election in Edo State was held on 25 February 2023 as part of the nationwide 2023 Nigerian presidential election to elect the president and vice president of Nigeria. Other federal elections, including elections to the House of Representatives and the Senate, were also held on the same date while state elections were held two weeks afterward on 11 March.

== Background ==
The 2023 Nigerian Presidential election in Edo state was held on 25 February 2023 as part of the nationwide presidential election organized by the Independent National Electoral Commission (INEC). Edo state is located in the South-South geopolitical zone of Nigeria, has historically been politically competitive, with strong support for both the All Progressive Congress (APC) and the People Democratic Party (PDP) in previous election.

In the 2019 presidential election, the APC won the state, reflecting the party's influence at the federal level at the time. However, the political environment ahead of the 2023 election saw shifting alliances and growing public engagement, particularly among youth voters. The emergence of the Labour Party candidate Peter Obi as a prominent third party contender altered the traditional two-party dynamics in many states including Edo. INEC reported that over 2.5 million voters were registered from Edo State for the 2023 election, with hundreds of thousands accredited to vote on election day.

== Polling ==
Polling organisation/client	Fieldwork date	Sample size					Others	Undecided	Undisclosed	Not voting
Polling organisation/client	Fieldwork date	Sample size	Tinubu APC	Obi LP	Kwankwaso NNPP	Abubakar PDP	Others	Undecided	Undisclosed	Not voting
BantuPage	December 2022	N/A	3%	64%	5%	5%	–	11%	9%	5%
BantuPage	January 2023	N/A	15%	56%	0%	5%	–	4%	5%	2%
Nextier (Edo crosstabs of national poll)	27 January 2023	N/A	2.6%	76.9%	–	9.0%	1.3%	10.3%	–	–
SBM Intelligence for EiE (Edo crosstabs of national poll)	22 January-6 February 2023	N/A	3%	61%	–	10%	2%	23%	–	–

== Projections ==
Source	Projection		As of
Africa Elects (Note: Africa Elects projections predict the likelihood of a candidate winning a state by categorizing a state as "Safe" for exceedingly likely, "Likely" for somewhat likely, and "Lean" for least likely. If no clear determination could be made, states are categorized as "tossups".)	Likely Obi		24 February 2023
Dataphyte (Note: Dataphyte projections predict candidates' projected votal shares in each state.)
Dataphyte	Tinubu:	25.14%	11 February 2023
Dataphyte	Obi:	31.46%	11 February 2023
Dataphyte	Abubakar:	25.14%	11 February 2023
Dataphyte	Others:	18.25%	11 February 2023
Enough is Enough- SBM Intelligence (Note: EiE-SBM projections predict which candidates will win states.)	Obi		17 February 2023
SBM Intelligence (Note: SBM projections predict which candidates will win states or, if no determination could be made, categorizes states as "Too close to call" (TCC).)	Obi		15 December 2022
ThisDay (Note: ThisDay projections predict candidates' projected votal shares in each state.)
ThisDay	Tinubu:	15%	27 December 2022
ThisDay	Obi:	35%	27 December 2022
ThisDay	Kwankwaso:	–	27 December 2022
ThisDay	Abubakar:	35%	27 December 2022
ThisDay	Others/Undecided:	15%	27 December 2022
The Nation (Note: SBM projections predict which candidates will win states or, if no determination could be made, categorizes states as "Battlegrounds.")	Battleground		12-19 February 2023

== General election ==
=== Results ===
According to official results released by the Independent Electoral Commission (INEC), Labour Party candidate Peter Obi won the presidential election in Edo State with 331,163 votes. The APC candidate Bola Tinubu received 144,471 votes, while Atiku Abubakar of the PDP secured 89,585 votes. Rabiu Kwankwaso of the New Nigeria Peoples Party (NNPP) received 2,743 votes

2023 Nigerian presidential election in Edo State
Party	Candidate	Votes	%
A	Christopher Imumolen		
AA	Hamza al-Mustapha		
ADP	Yabagi Sani		
APP	Osita Nnadi		
AAC	Omoyele Sowore		
ADC	Dumebi Kachikwu		
APC	Bola Tinubu	112,581	22.47%
APGA	Peter Umeadi		
APM	Princess Chichi Ojei		
BP	Sunday Adenuga		
LP	Peter Obi	293,962	58.70%
NRM	Felix Johnson Osakwe		
New Nigeria Peoples Party	Rabiu Kwankwaso	2,765	0.55%
PRP	Kola Abiola		
PDP	Atiku Abubakar	81,311	16.23%
SDP	Adewole Adebayo		
YPP	Malik Ado-Ibrahim		
ZLP	Dan Nwanyanwu		
Total votes			100.00%
Invalid or blank votes			N/A
Turnout			

==== By senatorial district ====
The results of the election by senatorial district.

Senatorial district	Bola Tinubu APC		Atiku Abubakar PDP		Peter Obi LP		Rabiu Kwankwaso NNPP		Others		Total valid votes
Senatorial district	Votes	%	Votes	%	Votes	%	Votes	%	Votes	%	Total valid votes
Edo Central Senatorial District (Note: Comprising the local government areas of Esan Central, Esan North-East, Esan South-East, Esan West, and Igueben.)	TBD	%	TBD	%	TBD	%	TBD	%	TBD	%	TBD
Edo North Senatorial District (Note: Comprising the local government areas of Akoko Edo, Etsako Central, Etsako East, Etsako West, Owan East, and Owan West.)	TBD	%	TBD	%	TBD	%	TBD	%	TBD	%	TBD
Edo South Senatorial District (Note: Comprising the local government areas of Egor, Ikpoba Okha, Oredo, Orhionmwon, Ovia North-East, Ovia South-West, and Uhunmwonde.)	TBD	%	TBD	%	TBD	%	TBD	%	TBD	%	TBD
Totals	TBD	%	TBD	%	TBD	%	TBD	%	TBD	%	TBD

==== By federal constituency ====
The results of the election by federal constituency.

Federal Constituency	Bola Tinubu (APC)	%	Atiku Abubakar (PDP)	%	Peter Obi (LP)	%	Rabiu Kwankwanso (NNPC)	%	Others votes	%	
Akoko-Edo Federal Constituency	19,456	49.5	10,513	26.80	8,471	21.5	183	0.47	611	1.56	39,234
Egor/Ikpoba-Okha Federal Constituency	13,244	10.6	12, 659	10.2	93,902	75.76	722	0.58	3,416	2.76	123,943
Esan Central/Esan West/Igueben Federal Constituency	10,294	18.0	9,852	17.2	35,434	61.97	325	0.57	1,274	2.23	57,179
Esan North East/Esan South East Federal Constituency	4,435	11.3	3,536	9.03	30,306	77.38	206	0.53	682	1.74	39,165
Etsako East/Etsako West/Etsako Central Federal Constituency	25,951	47.9	17,631	32.57	9,242	17.07	314	0.58	993	1.83	54,131
Oredo Federal Constituency	6,259	8.77	3,923	5.49	58,929	82.54	377	0.53	1,908	2.67	71,396
Orhionmwon/Uhunmwonde Federal Constituency	9,830	25.08	7,207	18.39	21,084	53.79	215	0.55	863	2.20	39199
Ovia North East/Ovia South West Federal Constituency	12,802	24.40	8.082	15.40	30,026	57.22	270	0.51	1,292	2.46	52,472
Owan East/Owan West Federal Constituency	10,310	40.66	7,908	31.19	6,568	25.9	153	0.66	415	1.64	25,354

Totals (Edo State)

Totals (Edo State)

Candidate	Vote	%
Peter Obi (LP)	293,962	58.70
Bola Tinubu (APC)	112,581	22.47
Atiku Abubakar (PDP)	81,311	16.23
Rabiu Kwankwaso (NNPP)	2,765	0.55
Others	11,454	2.29
Total Valid Votes	501,973	100

==== By local government area ====
The results of the election by local government area.

Federal constituency	Bola Tinubu APC	Atiku Abubakar PDP	Peter Obi LP	Rabiu Kwankwaso NNPC	Others	Total valid votes
Akoko Edo	19456	10513	8471	183	611	39,234
Egor	8877	6728	30263	186	742	46,796
Esan Central	4,458	3,692	10,192	91	329	18,762
Esan North-East	2,589	2,091	18,973	146	438	24,237
Esan South-East	1,846	1,445	11,333	60	244	14,928
Esan West	3,417	2,630	18,793	170	721	25,731
Etsako Central	6,035	3,450	2,791	66	180	12,522
Etsako East	6,465	4,040	2,468	74	222	13,269
Etsako West	13,451	10,141	3,983	174	591	28,340
Igueben	2,419	3,530	6,449	64	224	12,686
Ikpoba Okha	4,367	5,931	63,639	536	2,674	77,147
Oredo	6,259	3,923	58,929	377	1,908	71,396
Orihionmwon	6,527	4,668	9,049	121	542	20,907
Ovia North-East	5,110	3,660	21,624	170	504	30,768
Ovia South-West	7,692	4,722	8,402	100	788	21,704
Owan East	5,324	4,207	3,610	82	211	13,434
Owan West	4,986	3,701	2,958	71	204	11,920
Uhunmwonde	3,303	2,539	12,035	94	321	18,292

== See also ==
- 2023 Nigerian elections
- 2023 Nigerian presidential election
