= Emai people =

The Emai people are a group of people that inhabit a sizable part of Afenmai land in the northwest Edo State of Nigeria. They are a people of Edo extraction currently scattered around the Owan River. Emai territory is bounded on the south by Erah, on the west by Ora, on the east by Ihievbe and on the north by the peoples of Uokha and Ake. All of these groups of people are bounded by ancestry to a common founder, a person called Imah.

== Early history and migration ==
Imah (or Imaran) was believed to be born to an Ubini, Prince Kuoboyuwa, around the fourteenth century AD (circa 1415). His father was the eldest son of Oba Ewuare and heir apparent to the throne. Young Imah, emotionally shattered by the sudden death of his father, found life miserable in the palace household, and with his grandfather's blessing decided to migrate with his immediate family.

The young troubled prince found a home at Ugboha (a word meaning "near home" or "by the okha tree") close to the present-day ancient town of Uokha. The Uokha people, also of Ubini extraction, are located near the Kukuruku Hills of what is today Ihievbe-Ogben town close to Edoland. The area is believed to have been unclaimed and uninhabited at that period of time. Amidst this thickly dense forestation Imah made a home for his family. It came to be called Eko-Imah or Ehe-Imah which means "Imah's camp" or "Imah's place." Over time this was corrupted to Emai (meaning "our own" or "our land is good").

At one time the place was dominated by the okha trees common in the Nigerian Guinea savannah belt. Imah is said to have been cured mysteriously by one of these trees when he was ill, thus giving the town of Uokha its name. This is the origin of the Eseokhai festival, commemorating the trees that had given Imah both refuge on his journey and a cure for his ailment.

Imah was survived by a son, Uzuanbi. In his old age Imah decided to return to the land of his ancestors in Ubini to take over his grandfather's throne, leaving Uzuanbi and his family behind. Shortly afterward, word reached Uzuanbi of the death of his father in Ubini. This forced Uzuanbi to return to Ubini to perform his father's burial rites. On getting there, he found out that his brother had been crowned king in his place and it was against the Edo custom to crown two kings at the same time. So it was decided that his descendants will never bow to the Oba or king. On the completion of these rites he returned with two wives, Odidi and Oron. While Odidi had three children, Oron was reportedly barren. The children of Odidi were Owunno, Orhuamen and Urle.

Today the people of Emai occupy the towns of Uanhumi, Ovbiwun, Afuze, Eteye, Ogute, Evbiamen Eda (River), Evbiamen Otoi (Land), Ugboha, Okpokhunmi, Emai Ode, Ake, Ikhin, Iyievbu Uanke (Warrake), Ivbiaro, Ihievbe, Ojavun and Ojavun-Ago. Due to the need for expansion and the growing population of the Emai people they were forced to move southward, which resulted in clashes with neighboring clans. An example is the famous skirmish with the people of Erah which ensued in a war; this memory remains as the famous war of "Ogodo bi Isagua" (meaning "war of mud and death") which forced the Erah people to move further south. This war was mainly fought by the descendants of Urle and Erah while the movement of Ogute from Emai-Ugbowa led to the expulsion of the Uhonmora Ora peoples and the founding of Ogute and Ago Ojavun to the Eme-ora borders.

== Emai kingship and leadership ==
In keeping with Benin traditions, the people of Emai had the "odion evbo," which was the oldest man from the oldest town (Uanhumi) to be their king. The discussion of the leadership tussle also throws more light upon the population increase and the reason why there was subsequent migration from Ugbokha.

During the burial rites of his father in Ubini, it is believed that Uzuanbi had an affair with the wife of another man and she bore a male son who was in fact his eldest child. This child suffered considerable hostilities as regards acceptability and difficulty in effectively winning the leadership support of Owunno, whose descendants are today Evbiamen, Okpohumi and Ojavun. He left his descendants to be supported only by Urle, who are today Eteye and Afuze. This would make the people of Uanhumi, Afuze and Eteye to be the first to leave the parent settlement of Emai-Ugbowa.

The reason for the skirmish was the fact that Owunno refused to accept the seniority of Uanhumi who was supported by his brother Urle. This is the reason why Uanhumi and the people of Urle had to leave and remained close to each other.

Traditionally, the oldest man in Uanhumi is the OdeEdion of Emai Regent King and is known to choose his speaker or prime minister from Uze, a tradition that existed till the late 18th century. Due to the emergence of colonial rule and the use of traditional rulers as district officers for the purposes of tax collection by the British colonial government, the prime minister usurped the position of Ode Edion of Emai from Uanhumi, which was presumably weak and small in size at the time.

Since every town had its cults regarding the rights to ascension of positions, this right was at that time left exclusively to Uanhumi, but today the descendants of Urle of the Uze (now called "Afuze") Okpa, Ojavun, Okpokhumi, Ugbule Ugboa. However, the past Oleijes of Emai have all come from the Uankhuechie ( Uze) in ruling house and the 4th about to come from there too. Though the most revered and oldest of deities is still at Uanhumi, the throne was lost to the Afuze who have produced four heirs to the throne as Oleije of Emai.

The people of Ovbiowun to this day have a parallel kingship known as Oleije of Ovbiowun and celebrate their separate festival of Ese-Okhai, meaning "benefits from the okah tree."

Despite a contrary version above, Uanhumi was saddled with the lineage shrine priesthood not rulership of Emai as that was apportioned by their father to Urule. Uankhuechie the first son of Urule has produced nearly all the presidents of the council of warrant Chiefs and also the past 3 Oleijes.

Today there exists only one way to have common consensus: if only the powerful rulers of Urle and the rest of Emai are magnanimous enough to unite the Eije Cult (the cult of chiefs) with the aim of a single ruling hierarchy. This remains to be seen. The right to kingship is extended to all male children at birth who are unarguably descendants of Imah and are capable of obeying and participating in the princely duties of the Eije Cults.

== Last three Oleijes (kings) of Emai ==
- HRH Eboreime Irhuobuzo
- HRH Ojealaro Ageloisa
- HRH Ailoje Ogedengbe
- His Highness Prince Edekin Age-Ogedengbe is about to be crowned in December 2024 as the 4th substantive Oleije of Emai.

== Language ==
The language of the Emai finds most of its words from its parent Benin language of Edoid classification and the neighboring tribes of Ora, Ihievbe, Uokha and Yoruba.

=== Common greetings ===
- Ese – Hello
- Edioo – Good Morning (by men)
- Laoba – Good Morning (by women)
- Edi – Good Day
- Osen chian – Goodbye
- Amiegbe – So Long
- Ochian akhor – See you tomorrow or Good night
- Vbo oko – General greeting or well done
- Er en – Greeting from an elder person to younger one(s)
- Iso Iso – Ese Okhai festival greeting, meaning "I have survived"

== Emai beliefs and culture ==
The Emai people practice animism and indigenous worship of ancestors, as well as Christianity.

=== Festivals ===
- Oghae - children age group
- Eseokhai - traditional new year
- Aovbukpode - adult age group
- Oimiyan - masquerade festival

Agagan festival (ISO-ISO)-A famous festival in honour of late Agagan, a great entertainer and diseased loved ones.

ISO-ISO is a new yam festival a continuous practice of the Eseokhai festival.

=== Emai contributions to Nigeria ===
Emai is the dominant tribe in Owan East Local Government Area of Edo State Nigeria. It has produced leaders for Nigeria and Edo in all spheres of life, including education, politics, health care, industry and the Nigerian armed forces.

== Emai people abroad ==
Many Emai citizens live abroad in countries such as the United States, countries in Europe, and other parts of the globe.

Emai children have various unions. They include Emai union worldwide with branches in Lagos, Gothenburg, London and New York City and other umbrella organizations.
