= Kukuruku =

Kukuruku may refer to:

- Kukuruku Hills, Nigeria
- Kukuruku Division, a former division in a province of Nigeria
- Kukuruku people, a former British name of Afemai people, Nigeria
- Kukuruku language, a former British name of the language of Afemai people, Nigeria
