= Francis Alimikhena =

Nigerian politician

Senator Francis Alimikhena
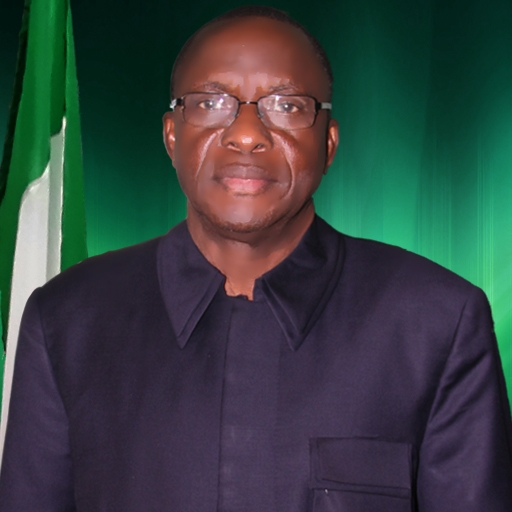

Senator of the Federal Republic of Nigeria from Edo North Senatorial District
- In office 6 June 2015 – 11 June 2023 Serving with Clifford Ordia; Matthew Urhoghide
- Preceded by: Domingo Alaba Obende
- Succeeded by: Adams Oshiomhole

Deputy Chief Whip 8th National Assembly
- In office 10 June 2015 – 9 June 2019
- Preceded by: Ayoola Hosea Agboola
- Succeeded by: Aliyu Sabi Abdullahi

Vice-Chairman of the Senate Committee on Housing
- In office 3 November 2015 – 9 June 2019
- Preceded by: Bukar Ibrahim
- Succeeded by: Lola Ashiru

Personal details
- Born: Francis Asekhame Alimikhena; 20 September 1947 (age 79) Etsako East, Edo, Nigeria
- Party: Peoples Democratic Party
- Education: University of Buckingham, United Kingdom (LLB); Nigerian Law School (B.L)
- Profession: Businessman; politician; retired military officer
- Awards: Forces Service Star (FSS)
- Website: senatoralimikhena.wordpress.com

Military service
- Allegiance: Nigeria
- Branch/service: Nigerian Army
- Years of service: 1972–2000
- Rank: Major
- Commands: Multinational Joint Task Force

Francis Asekhame Alimikhena (born 20 September 1947) is a former Senator of the Federal Republic of Nigeria from Edo State. He served in the Senate from 2015 to 2023, representing Edo North Senatorial District. He was first elected in 2015 and reelected to a second term in 2019. However, he lost his re-election bid in 2023. Alimikhena was the vice-chairman, Senate Committee on Housing and also a member of the Senate committee on Constitutional Review.

Alimikhena is a member of the Peoples Democratic Party (PDP). He was the Deputy Chief Whip of the 8th National Assembly.

Edo North Senatorial District covers six local government areas: (Etsako West, Etsako Central, Etsako East, Owan East, Owan West and Akoko Edo).

== Childhood, military and education ==
Alimikhena was born in Igiode area of Etsako East local government area in Edo state on 20 September 1947. He was born into a strong catholic Christian home and grew up with a strong Christian principle.

He joined the Nigerian Army as a commissioned officer in 1972. He was later commissioned as a lieutenant in 1982 and then held the position of Adjutant, Army Garrison between 1985 and 1989 and later promoted a Major in 1992. Alimikhena was awarded the Forces Service Star (FSS) in 1999. An honour meant for service Officers who have served the Army without blemish. Other positions held are Senior Officer (finance): Nigerian Army School of Engineering, Makurdi, Benue State, Nigerian Army Pension Board and Army Petroleum Trust Fund between 1999 and 2000. He retired from the Army a Major in 2000.

Alimikhena started his education at Saint Thomas Secondary Modern School, and left in 1981. Thereafter, he proceeded to the University of Buckingham, United Kingdom to study Law. He earned a Bachelor of Law (L.L.B) in 2003 and was later called to the Nigerian Bar as a solicitor and advocate of the Supreme Court of Nigeria.

== Private enterprise and philanthropic service ==
Alimikhena is a businessman and philanthropist. He currently sits on the board of several companies. He is currently the chairman of Falzal group of companies, Vice Chairman of Solidgate properties, Managing partner at FA Alimikhena & Co (Global Chambers) and also was the President of Anthony BBC between 1994 and 1997.

His philanthropic work within the Catholic church family also gave him the honour of the certificate of the Mariam queen of the universe shrine in Orlando Florida, United States also Pope Benedict XVI honoured him with the papal knight of Saint Gregory the great. He is also a member of Knight of Saint Mulumba (KSM) and was given a respected traditional title as the OKHASO of wappa Wanno Kingdom by the Afemai people.

== Political campaign and governance ==
In 2007, Alimikhena joined politics by contesting for the Edo North senatorial seat under the platform of Peoples Democratic Party but lost. He later contested in 2011 for the same senatorial post but lost again. Thereafter, he defected to the All Progressives Congress and contested for the same senatorial seat in 2015 and won, after polling a total of 86,021 to beat his closest rival Pascal Ugbome of the People's Democratic Party who polled 66,062 votes.

== Senator of the Federal Republic of Nigeria ==
On 19 December 2014, Alimikhena emerged as the senatorial candidate of the All Progressives Congress (APC) in a heated party primary election at Edo state.

Alimikhena was elected to the Senate of the Federal Republic of Nigeria as the All Progressives Congress candidate from Edo North in March 2015. He won the election with 86,021 votes. He was sworn in as a senator on 6 June 2015. Alimikena was the only elected All Progressives Congress senator in the entire South South and South Eastern part of Nigeria in 2015 general election.

He ran for the position of Deputy Senate President in 2019.

Alimikhena has sponsored several bills in the Senate:

1. Chartered Institute of Capital Market Registrar (est., etc.) Bill 2015 (SB. 25)
2. A Bill for an Act to provide for the Establishment of Environmental Managers Registration Council of Nigeria to provide for Code of Conduct, Professional Ethics and Stipulation of Minimum Standards and for other related matters, 2016 (S.B. 88)
3. Agricultural Processing Zones Establishing Bill 2016
4. Establishment of national commission for persons with disabilities (SB22)

In the 25 February 2023, Edo North senatorial district National Assembly election, he was defeated by Adams Oshiomhole.

Amid the 21 September 2024 poll, Francis Alimikhena dumped Peoples Democratic Party, and rejoined All Progressives Congress, despite accusing them of "injustice" two years ago.

== Family life ==
Senator Alimikhena is married to Lady Alimikhena and blessed with children.

== Memberships and clubs ==
- Member, Nigerian bar association (NBA)
- Member, International Bar Association (IBA)
- Member, IBB Lagos golf club Ikeja
- Member, Usagbe club of Nigeria

== Projects ==
- Building of Igiode Primary school
- Functional health center in Igiode
- Functional boreholes in Igiode
