= Edo North senatorial district =

Senatorial district in Nigeria

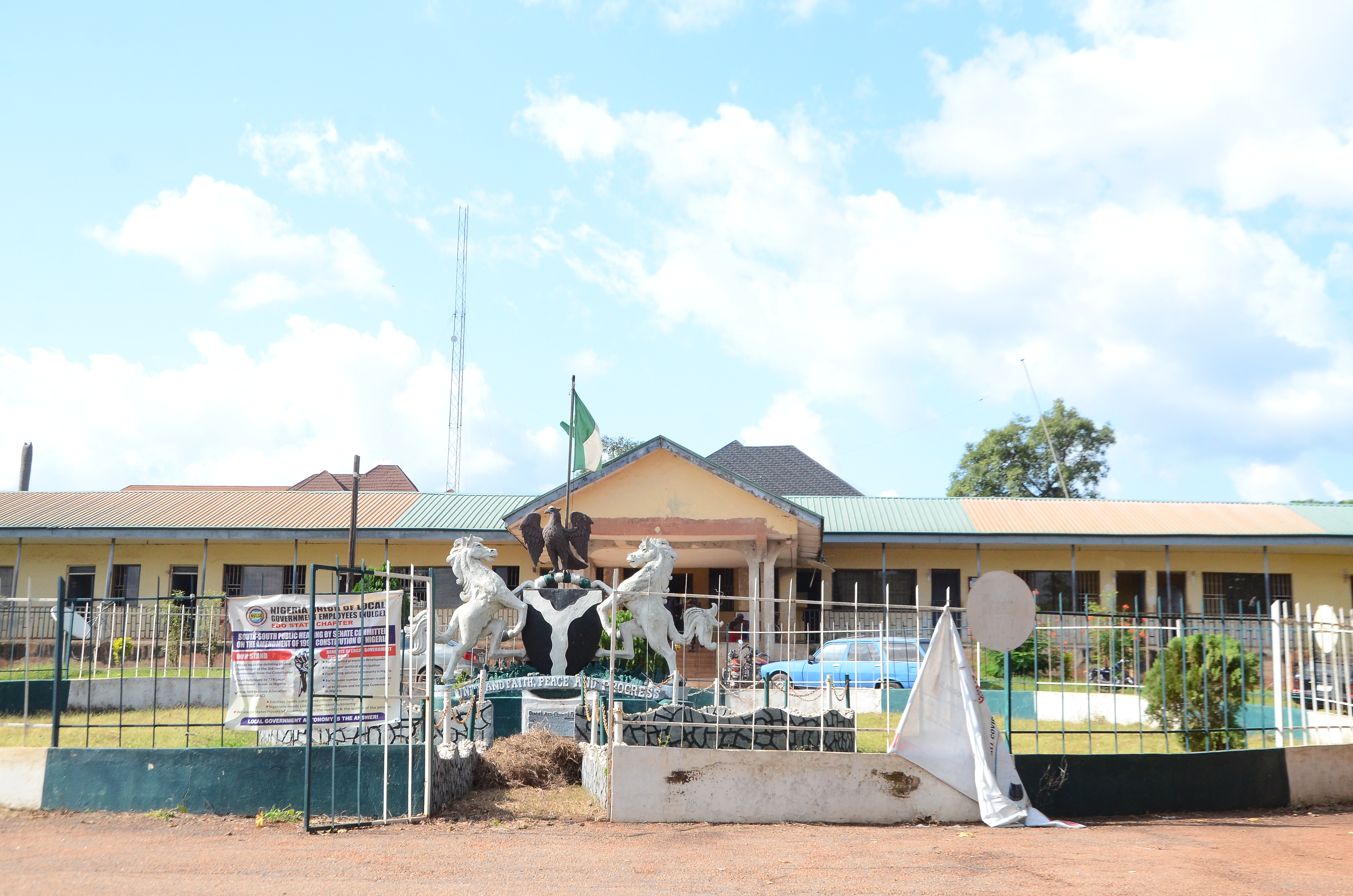
Etsako West Local Government Secretariat

Edo North senatorial district in Edo State comprises six local government areas which consist of Etsako West, Etsako East, Etsako Central, Owan West, Owan East and Akoko Edo. The headquarters (collation centre) of Edo North is Auchi in Etsako West LGA. The current representative of Edo North is comr. Adams Aliu Oshiomole of the All Progressives Congress, APC.

== List of senators representing Edo North ==
Senator	Party	Year	Assembly
Victor Oyofo	PDP	1999 - 2007	4th 5th
Yisa Braimoh	PDP	2007 - 2011	6th
Domingo Obende	ACN	2011 - 2015	7th
Francis Alimikhena	APC	2015–2023	8th 9th
Adams Oshiomhole	APC	2023–present	10th

== Notable people from Edo North ==
- Michael Imoudu, a former labour union leader and founder of the Nigeria state
- Chief Julius Momo Udochi the first Nigerian ambassador to the United States
- George Agbazika Innih, one-time military governor of Bendel and Kwara States
- Abdul Rahman Mamudu, former commander of the Nigerian Army Signals Corps and military administrator in Gongola State
- John Momoh, CEO of Channels Television
- Adams Oshiomhole, former president of Nigeria Labour Congress and former governor of Edo State
- Tony Momoh, former Minister of Information and Culture
- Anthony Ikhazoboh, minister of sports and transport
- Francis Alimikhena
- Anamero Sunday Dekeri Esq., A philanthropist and Accomplished Entrepreneur
