= Uzebba =

- Location in Nigeria
- Coordinates: 7°0′N 5°54′E
- Country: Nigeria
- State: Edo State
- LGA: Owan West
- Climate: Aw

Uzebba is a town in the Owan local council of Edo State, Nigeria. Uzebba, along with its neighbouring towns and villages, Avboisi, Okpuje, Ukhuse-Osi, Ukhuse-Oke in Owan, Etsakor, and Akoko Edo, are known as Afemai. They collectively make up Edo-North Senatorial District.

It is situated in the northern part of the state, approximately 4 kilometers southeast of Okpuje and 4 kilometers north of Avbiosi.

== History ==
Uzebba has a rich history dating back to the 15th century. It was a major center of power and influence in the ancient Benin Empire. The town is home to the Oba of Iuleha, a traditional monarch who has ruled the area for centuries.

== Geography ==
Uzebba is located at an elevation of 242 meters (794 feet) above sea level. The town is surrounded by rolling hills and fertile farmland, making it an important center for agriculture in the region.

== Demographics ==
The town is inhabited by the Edo people, who are the indigenous ethnic group of the area.

== Economy ==
The economy of Uzebba is primarily based on agriculture, with crops such as yams, cassava, and maize being major productions. It is also a center for cocoa farming, making it a major cocoa production center along with other cocoa producing communities in the adjoining Yoruba state of On do. It also was a center for the production of rubber and palm oil as well as colanuts As part of its cash crops economy. The town is also known for its traditional crafts, including wood carvings and textiles
