= Igue =

Igue is a clan of the Afemai or Afenmai ethnic group who inhabit the hilly areas and valley of the Owan East Local Government Area of Edo State of Nigeria. The Igue Clan are residents in two areas, that is on the hills and in the valley. The area on the hills is known as Igue-Oke, while the area in the valley is called Igue-Sale. Their postal code is 313106 which is also shared with Aiyetoro Camp.
