= Linda Bellos =

British businesswoman and activist

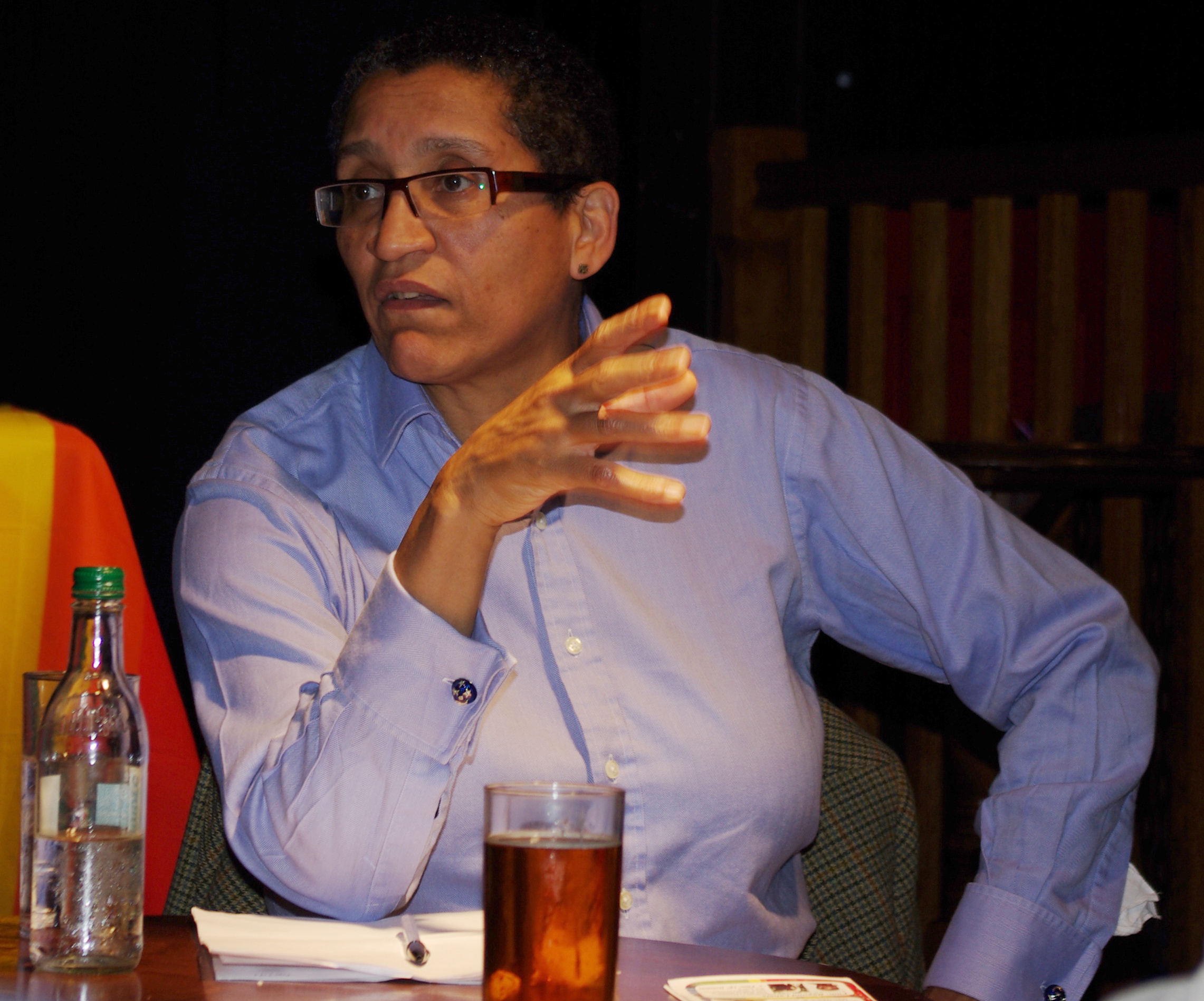
- Bellos in 2010
- Born: Linda Ann Adebowale; 13 December 1950 (age 75); London, England
- Education: University of Sussex
- Occupations: Politician; activist
- Political party: Labour
- Spouse: Jonathan Bellos (m. 1970; div. 1983)
- Partner: Caroline Jones (CP 2005–2015)
- Children: 2

Linda Ann Bellos OBE (born 13 December 1950) is a British businesswoman, radical feminist and lesbian rights activist. In 1981 she became the first woman of African descent to join the Spare Rib collective. She was elected to Lambeth Borough Council in London in 1985 and was the leader of the council from 1986 to 1988.

== Early life ==
Bellos was born in London to a white Polish-Jewish mother, Renee Sackman, and a Nigerian, Yoruba father, Emmanuel Adebowale, who came from Uzebba and had joined the British Merchant Navy during the Second World War. Renee Sackman was disowned by her family for marrying an African Christian. Raised in Brixton, Bellos was educated at Silverthorne Girls' Secondary Modern School, Dick Sheppard Comprehensive School, and the University of Sussex (1978–81).

== Career ==
=== Feminism ===
Bellos is a radical feminist and was the first non-white lesbian to join the Spare Rib feminist collective in 1981. She criticises the movement's "point scoring" and the manner in which the women's movement was, in her view, dominated by white, middle-class women.

She rejects the term "mixed race" because she considers that every attempt to define race is reduced to definitions of skin colour. She uses the term "mixed heritage" instead. Bellos is a person of African and Eastern European Jewish heritage. She uses the inclusive political term of "Black" to describe herself.

=== Politics ===
She was vice-chair of the successful Labour Party Black Sections campaign to select African, Caribbean and Asian parliamentary and local candidates within the Labour Party.

Bellos was elected as a Labour councillor for Larkhall ward on Lambeth London Borough Council in 1985. She was leader of the council between 1986 and 1988. She was the second Black woman to become leader of a British local authority, after Merle Amory in the northwest London Borough of Brent. Bellos resigned as leader on 21 April 1988, after disputes within the Labour Party over the setting of the council budget. She was a prominent figure in left-wing politics in London in the 1980s and was labelled by The Sun as a member of the "Loony Left". Bellos attempted to become a parliamentary candidate, without success, most notably for Vauxhall, south London, in the Lambeth borough, where there was a by-election in 1989, following the resignation of Stuart Holland MP. Fellow Black Sections vice-chair Martha Osamor was chosen by the local party to be the prospective parliamentary candidate but she was rejected as too left-wing by Labour leader Neil Kinnock, who got Kate Hoey imposed by the national party.

Bellos was the treasurer of the Africa Reparations Movement (UK) (see Reparations for slavery). She was co-chair of the Southwark LGBT Network until February 2007 and an adviser to Southwark Council. From 2000 to 2003, she was co-chair of the LGBT Advisory Group to the Metropolitan Police. She remains a community activist.

=== Equality ===
As a lesbian feminist, Bellos argued strongly in the early 1980s that an inclusive approach to women's issues must take account of social class, minority and majority ethnic identity, disability, sexual identity and religion. This approach was unpopular at the time. More recently, Bellos teaches employers and their staff to apply the Equality Act 2010, the Human Rights Act 1998 and other equality law. She notably originated Black History Month in the UK whilst chair of the London Strategic Policy Unit. Bellos, however, has also been vocal against transgender rights.

Bellos has worked on mainstreaming equality within many public bodies, including the British Army and the Metropolitan Police Service. She was an Independent Advisor to the Metropolitan Police, the Crown Prosecution Service, and the Association of Chief Police Officers, through her consultancy work.

She is a founder member and former Chair of The Institute of Equality and Diversity Practitioners.

=== Radio, TV, and writing ===
Bellos is a regular guest on radio and television programmes, contributing to discussions on many topics including equality, human rights and feminism.

As an author, she has contributed to a number of anthologies, including IC3: The Penguin Book of New Black Writing in Britain.

== Personal life ==
In 1970 she married Jonathan Bellos. They had two children, born in 1974 and 1976. She came out as a lesbian in 1980, and her marriage ended in divorce in 1983. Linda left her children to live in an all-female commune.

On 21 December 2005, Bellos and her partner, Caroline Jones, entered into a civil partnership: Caroline died in 2015. In 2020, Bellos entered into a civil partnership with Marian Davis.

== Awards ==
On 9 December 2002, Bellos was presented (together with Stephen Bourne) with the Metropolitan Police Volunteer Awards "in recognition of outstanding contribution in supporting the local community."

In 2006, she was appointed OBE in the Queen's New Year's Honours for services to diversity. She was reticent about receiving the honour because she considers its association with a defunct Empire as outdated and that it should be renamed. She was encouraged to accept it by her family.
