= Okpekpe =

Human settlement in Edo State, Nigeria

Okpekpe (sometimes spelled as Okphekphe) is a town in Etsako East Local Government Area of Edo State, Nigeria. It is located about 25 kilometres (16 mi) northeast of Auchi. It has a population of 3155 inhabitants. Its people belong to a homogeneous group of people, called the Afemai.

Okpekpe is located at a latitude of 7.2 (7° 12' 0 N) and a longitude of 6.47 (6° 28' 0 E), about 354 kilometers south west (209°) of the approximate center of Nigeria and 240 kilometres (150 mi) south-west (209°) of the capital Abuja.

Okpekpe is in North Ibie, belongs to a large homogeneous group of people, the Ibie found in Afemai land, which is at the northern part of Edo State. The Ibie are bordered by River Niger to the east, Etsako West to the west, Auchi to the south, and Kwara State & Kogi State to the north. Okpekpe is surrounded by other towns and villages like Imiegba, Itsukwi, Imiakebu, Ebelle, Ukhomedokhai, Okeko, Ikphelli, Ukho, Amughe etc. The population of the Ibie people has been estimated to be about 100,000 people, according to the 2006 population census.

The village head and "clan head" is called Onwueweko of Okpekpe. The clan headship rotates between Apa and Ede title holders. The current Onwueweko is Peter Abalume Osigbemeh. Whilst the current Ede is Engr. Donaldson Aloaye Eshilama.

They have several festivals, notably Beans and New Yam Festival locally called Eshile and Ukphakpha respectively. It marks the beginning of the harvest season. Another notable festival in Okpekpe is the National Day celebration.
