= MC Edo Pikin =

Nigerian comedian

Gbadamosi Agbonjor Jonathan, known as MC Edo Pikin, is a Nigerian comedian. He hails from Ihievbe community of Edo State. In 2021, MC Edo Pikin won The Humour Awards (THA) for the category of Standup Comedian of the Year.

== Career ==
In 2004 EP started his comedy career in Agenebode, and from there, he went to Abuja in 2007, where he became more motivated.

His older brother, Gbadamasi Bernard Koboko inspired his career as a comedian in 2004.

He is the C.E.O of Every Package Entertainment and has his popular comedy show known as Edo Pikin Undiluted. He has performed at Voltage-of-hype, Bovi's Naughty by Nature, Supernova Live Concert.

In 2020, he raised awareness about COVID-19.

== Personal life ==
On 5 October 2019 MC Edo Pikin married wife Lily, and they have two children.

== Award and nomination ==
Year	Award	Category	Result	Ref.
2021	The Humour Awards	Standup Comedian of the Year	Won	
