= Peter Usman Aliu =

Nigerian politician

State Representative
- Constituency: Etsako East

Personal details
- Died: November 3, 2014
- Occupation: Politician

Peter Usman Aliu (died November 3, 2014) was a Nigerian politician who served as a member of the Edo State House of Assembly, representing the Etsako East Constituency.

== Early life and education ==
Aliu was born in Igbiode-Agenebode, located in Etsako East Local Government Area of Edo State. He completed his secondary education at St. Peter’s Grammar School, Agbenebode, before furthering his studies at the Federal Polytechnic, Auchi. Aliu later earned a Bachelor of Arts in Law and was called to the Nigerian Bar in 2000. He also obtained a Master’s degree from Ambrose Alli University in Ekpoma.
