= Kukuruku Hills =

Highlands in Nigeria

The Kukuruku Hills is a prominent area of dissected highlands in Nigeria, historically situated in the Afenmai Division. This region was previously known as the Kukuruku Division until 1956. Geographically, the Kukuruku Hills extend across parts of the Owo and Ekiti Divisions as well as areas of the Western Kabba Province.

== Name ==
The term "Kukuruku" originates from Nupe influences and reflects a history marked by conflict and stigmatization for the local communities. In the Etsako language, "Kukuruku" holds no inherent meaning and serves instead as a reminder of historical adversities, such as slavery and Nupe invasions during the late 19th century. These events led to widespread agitation among the local populace for a name change to better reflect their identity and heritage.

Efforts to rename the area began in 1933, spearheaded by the Etsako Union. In 1942, the union voted to replace "Kukuruku" with "Etsako." However, this decision faced resistance from Akoko communities, prompting reconsideration. By 1955, the Afenmai Divisional Council resolved to adopt the name "Afenmai", a change that was officially recognized in 1956 by the Western Region House of Assembly.

Chief Oshiogbele Momoh Idaoh (Momoh the First), the Ogieneni of Uzairue, played an important role in the renaming effort. Chief Idaoh's staunch opposition to the previously proposed name "Auchi Division" delayed the final decision until consensus was achieved in favor of "Afenmai Division".

Despite these efforts to change the name elsewhere, Kukuruku Hills remains the official title of the geographical region.

== Geography ==
The Kukuruku Hills are characterized by rolling uplands interspersed with rocky outcrops, primarily composed of weathered granite. The lower elevations feature laterite, while higher terrains are dotted with massive granite boulders. Key rivers in the region include:

- Orle River
- Edion River, which flows eastward toward the Niger River
- Owan River, originating in the northwest and merging with the Osse (Ovia) River

South of the Ozala-Uzeba road, the terrain transitions from dense forests to sparser vegetation, showcasing diverse ecological zones.

== Climate ==
The region experiences distinct wet (April to November) and dry (December to March) seasons. Annual rainfall varies significantly, with the southern parts receiving approximately 2,900 mm, while the northern areas average around 350 mm. The vegetation mirrors this climatic disparity:

- Southern regions: Lush orchard bush and abundant palm trees
- Northern regions: Sparse vegetation and extensive cornfields

== Communities and Tribes ==
The Kukuruku Hills are home to several communities and tribes, including:

- Otuo and Ikao tribes of the Ivbiosakon group
- North Ibie and Ukpila tribes of Etsako
- Communities such as Somorika, Onumu, Ogbe, Ijaja, and Ososo from North-West Edo

Historically, many of these settlements were established atop hills for defensive purposes during periods of inter-tribal conflict.

== Economic Activities and Mineral Resources ==
The fertile valleys of the Kukuruku Hills support extensive agricultural activities, making the region an important economic hub. Key mineral resources include:

- Iron ore: Found at Unguyami (associated with the Ukpila tribe)
- Mica: Present in the Otuo area
