= J. D. 'Okhai Ojeikere =

Nigerian photographer (1930–2014)

- Born: Johnson Donatus Aihumekeokhai Ojeikere; 10 June 1930; Ovbiomu-Emai, Owan East, Edo State, Nigeria
- Died: 2 February 2014 (aged 83)
- Occupation: Photographer
- Known for: Documenting Nigerian hairstyles

Johnson Donatus Aihumekeokhai Ojeikere (10 June 1930 – 2 February 2014), known as J.D. 'Okhai Ojeikere, was a Nigerian photographer known for his work with unique hairstyles found in Nigeria.

== Biography ==
Ojeikere was born on 10 June 1930 in Ovbiomu-Emai, Owan East, Edo State, a rural village in southwestern Nigeria. In addition to the dialect Emai, Ojeikere spoke Yoruba and English. He worked and lived in Ketu, Nigeria. At the age of 20, he took up photography, which was out of the ordinary for people in Nigeria, especially those in his village. Cameras were not in high demand and were of low priority as they were considered a luxury. However, in 1950 Enugu, Ojeikere bought for two pounds a modest Brownie D camera without flash, and had a friend teach him the fundamentals of photography. Ojeikere gained information about the Ministry for Information in Ibadan in 1951, and he would write the same letter to them every 15 days for two years. At the end of 1953, they finally replied that they had received Ojeikere's request, and it caught their attention.

Ojeikere started out as a darkroom assistant in 1954 at the Ministry of Information in Ibadan. In 1959, he became very busy with his professional activities in Ibadan and decided it was time to marry. Before he left the village of Ogute-Emai, he had chosen his wife, Ikegbua. Once she came of age in 1959, they paid the dowry and held a traditional marriage ceremony in their village. The following year, the couple welcomed their first son. As Catholic Christians, they went on to have a total of five children.

After Nigeria gained its independence in 1960, Ojeikere pursued his first job as a photographer. In 1961, he became a studio photographer, under Steve Rhodes, for Television House Ibadan. From 1963 to 1975, Ojeikere worked in publicity at West Africa Publicity in Lagos. In 1967, he was invited to join the Nigerian Arts Council. In 1968, he began one of his largest projects as he documented Nigerian hairstyles. This was a hallmark of his work and he printed approximately a thousand pictures of different African women's hair. In 1975, after 12 years of working, while Ojeikere was chief commercial photographer, his job was abolished. He left the company with an excellent photo library that was still in use, allowing him to set up his own business at Lagos Island, opening a studio named "Foto Ojeikere".

At the first Nigeria Photography Award (NIPHA) ceremony, organized by the multimedia organization Fullhouse Entertainment and held on Sunday, 31 July 2011, Ojeikere was one of the prominent Nigerian photographers, alongside Sunmi Smart-Cole, Don Barber, and Amos Olarenwaju Osidele, who were given lifetime achievement awards.

A large selection of Ojeikere's work was included in the arsenale section of the 55th Venice Biennale d'arte, "Il Palazzo Enciclopedia" curated by Massimiliano Gioni in 2013.

Ojeikere died on 2 February 2014, at the age of 83. He is the subject of a documentary film by Tam Fiofori entitled J. D. ‘Okhai Ojeikere: Master Photographer.

== Legacy ==
On Ojeikere's death, he left behind an archive of well over 10,000 photographs of his home country Nigeria.

His photography covers show how the hairstyles are seen as artistic, cultural, material, and social process, forming part of the unfolding African postcolonial modernity. The term used for many of the hairstyles he documented is "Onile-Gogoro", a Yoruba expression meaning "stand tall", which term was used to refer to the multi-storey buildings then sprouting in Nigerian cities and was popularized through the music that defined the language and social movements of the 1960s. The titles of Ojeikere's photographs are also often quite literal.

Ojeikere is most recognized for the black-and-white shots of elaborate, gravity-defying Nigerian hairstyles that he started photographing in the 1950s, which were presented at the 2013 Venice Biennale. Yet, as one of the first photojournalists in Nigeria, having lived from 1930 through the country's independence in 1960, military dictatorships, and village and city life, his perspective was much wider than fashion. Ojeikere also achieved an international profile in his lifetime, with his photography now in collections from the Metropolitan Museum of Art to the Tate Modern. Upon his death, Giulia Paoletti in the Department of the Arts of Africa, Oceania, and the Americas at the Metropolitan Museum of Art wrote: "His formal vocabulary is immediately recognizable: lack of backdrops or props, elegant female sitters, elaborate coiffures, soft lighting, immaculate black-and-white printing. In Ojeikere's hands, photography became a means to record the transient creativity that articulated Nigerian social and cultural life."

Medina Dugger, a Lagos-based photographer and admirer of Ojeikere's oeuvre, made the statement: "Prior to British rule, traditional hairstyles were the norm and varied according to tribe, social status, marital status, and special events." Dugger first travelled to Nigeria's largest city in 2011 at the behest of a classmate who had co-founded the LagosPhoto festival. It was there that she encountered Ojeikere's photography—his "Hairstyles" led to the creation of Dugger's "Chroma: An Ode to J.D. 'Okhai Ojeikere", a series of bold, color-soaked photos depicting modern, multi-hued updates of the hairstyles featured in Ojeikere's work.

== Publications ==
- J.D.'Okhai Ojeikere: Photographs. Zürich: Scalo, 2000. Edited by Andre Magnin. ISBN 978-3908247302.

== Collections ==
- Art Institute of Chicago, Chicago, IL: 1 print (as of August 2020)
- Museum of Modern Art, New York: 3 pairs of prints (as of August 2020)
- Metropolitan Museum of Art, New York: prints (as of August 2020)
- Museum of Fine Arts, Houston, Houston, Texas: 13 prints (as of August 2020)

== Exhibitions ==
=== Solo exhibitions ===
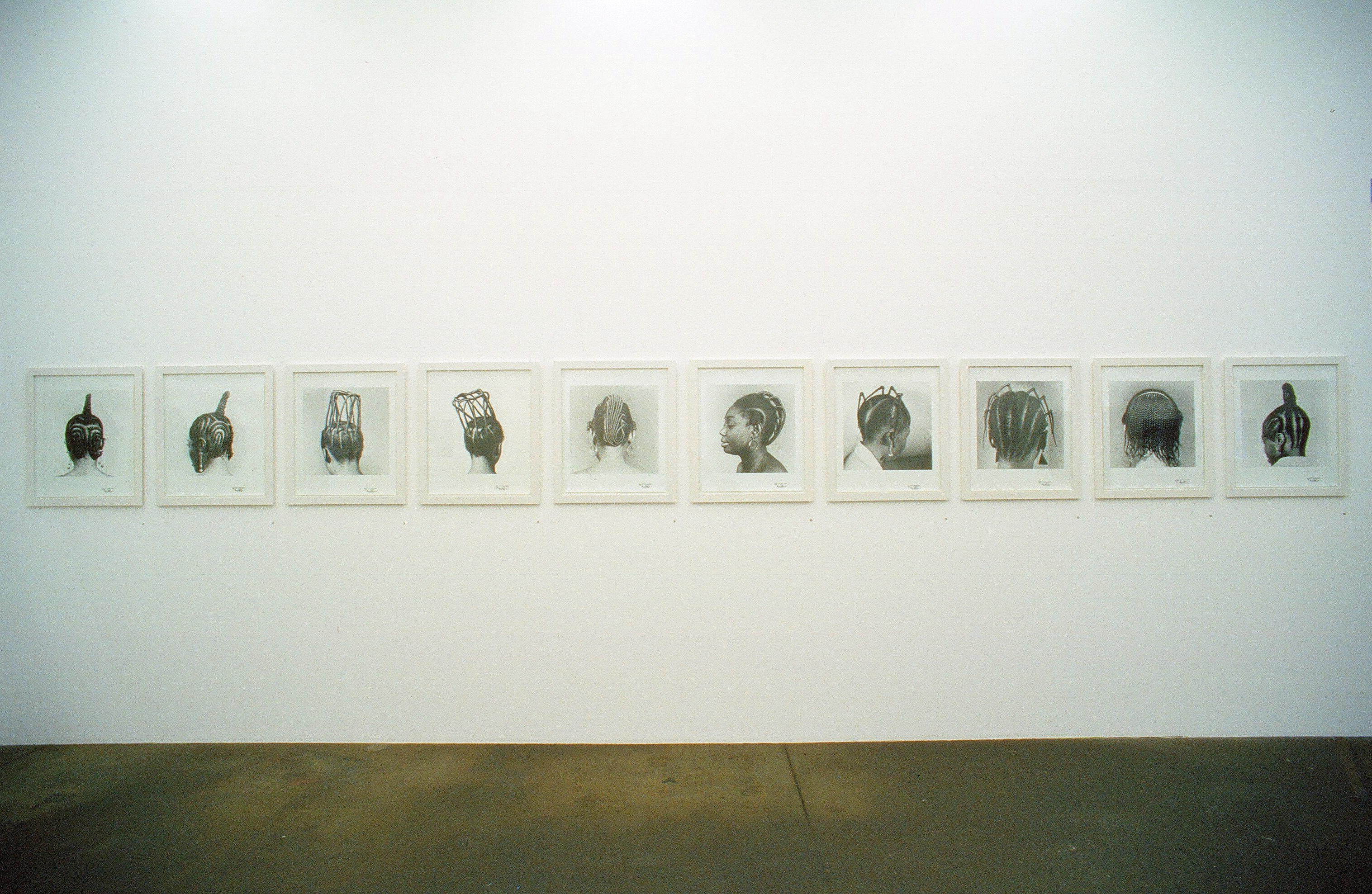
Ojeikere's 2001 Hairstyles exhibit.

- 1995: Ojeikere's first solo exhibition in Nigeria as well as an exhibition in Switzerland (first work shown outside his home country)
- 2000: J. D. ‘Okhai Ojeikere, Fondation Cartier pour l'Art Contemporain, Paris, France
- 2001: J. D. ‘Okhai Ojeikere: Hairstyles 1968 – 1999, MAMCO Musée d’art moderne et contemporain, Geneva, Switzerland
- 2005: Hairstyles: J.D. ‘Okhai Ojeikere, Blaffer Art Museum of the University of Houston, Texas, USA
- 2009: Hairdos and Parties: African Typographies by J.D. 'Okhai Ojeikere and Malick Sidibé, L. Parker Stephenson Photographs, New York
- 2010: Sartorial Moments, Centre for Contemporary Art, Lagos, Nigeria
- 2011: J.D. 'Okhai Ojeikere: Moments of Beauty, Centre for Contemporary Art, Lagos, Nigeria
- 2011: J.D. 'Okhai Ojeikere: Moments of Beauty, Kiasma Museum of Contemporary Art, Helsinki, Finland
- 2014: J.D. 'Okhai Ojeikere: Hairstyles and Headdresses, Royal Festival Hall, Southbank, London, UK

=== Group exhibitions ===
- 2000: Africa: Past-Present, Fifty-One Fine Art Photography, Antwerp
- 2001: Face Off, Aeroplastics Contemporary, Brussels
- 2002: Collection in Context – Recent Photography Acquisitions, The Studio Museum in Harlem, New York, USA
- 2003: Highlights from the collection of Foundation Cartier pour l’art contemporain, Paris: William Eggleston, Beat Streuli, Bill Viola, Vik Muniz, J.D. ‘Okhai Ojeikere, Pierrick sorin, Bildmuseet Umea Universitett, Umea, Sweden
- 2004: Joy of Life – two photographers from Africa: Seydou Keita, J.D. ‘Okhai Ojeikere, Hara Museum of Contemporary Art, Tokyo, Japan
- 2004: Nous Remontons de la "Calle" Toutes les Photographies!, Galerie du Jour Agnés B., Paris, France
- 2004: La collection d'art contemporain d'Agnès b. Je m'installe aux Abattoirs, Les Abattoirs – Frac Midi-Pyrénées, Toulouse, France
- 2005: Masterpieces from the Jean Pigozzi Collection, MFAH Museum of Fine Arts Houston, Houston, TX, USA
- 2006: 100% Africa, Guggenheim Museum, Bilbao, Spain
- 2006: About Africa Part One: Seydou Keita, Malick Sidbé, Jean-Dominque Burton, Jürgen Schadeberg, J. D. ‘Okhai Ojeikere, Fifty-One Fine Art Photography, Antwerp, Belgium.
- 2006: Some Tribes, Christophe Guye Galerie, Zurich, Switzerland
- 2008: Head Room, Mocca – Museum of Contemporary Canadian Art, Toronto, ON
- 2009: Chance Encounters, Sakshi Gallery, Mumbai
- 2009: 70s. Photography and Everyday Life, Teatro Fernan Gomez, PHotoEspaña, Madrid, Spain (catalogue ISBN 8492498773)
- 2009: 70s. Photography and Everyday Life, Museo D’Arte Provincia di Nuoro, Nuoro, Italy (catalogue ISBN 8492498773)
- 2009: J. D. 'Okhai Ojeikere and Malick Sidibe: Hairdos and Parties- African Typologies, L. Parker Stephenson Photographs, New York, USA
- 2010: 70s. Photography and Everyday Life, Centro Andaluz de Arte Contemporaneo, Seville, Spain (catalogue ISBN 8492498773)
- 2010: 70s. Photography and Everyday Life, Nederlands Fotomuseum, Rotterdam, Netherlands (catalogue ISBN 8492498773)
- 2010: A Midsummer Gallery Soirée, Hagedorn Foundation Gallery, Atlanta, GA, USA
- 2010: AIPAD – The Photography Show, L. Parker Stephenson Photographs, Park Avenue Armory, New York, USA
- 2010: National Black Arts Festival, Atlanta, GA, USA
- 2011: Becoming: Photographs from the Wedge Collection, Tate Modern, London, England
- 2012: Africa/Africa, Abbaya St. André, Centre d'art contemporain de Meymac, Meymac, France
- 2013: Voyage Retour – Federal Government Press, Broad Street, Lagos, Lagos Island, Nigeria
- 2013: The Encyclopedic Palace curated by Massimiliano Gioni, The Venice Biennale, Venice, Italy
- 2014: Back to Front, Mariane Ibrahim Gallery, Seattle, USA
- 2014: Ici l'Afrique, Château de Penthes, Pregny-Chambésy, France
- 2015: Making Africa - A Continent of Contemporary Design, Vitra Design Museum, Weil am Rhein, Germany
- 2016: Regarding Africa: Contemporary Art and Afro-Futurism, Tel Aviv Museum of Art, Tel Aviv, Israel
- 2020: Through an African Lens: Sub-Saharan Photography from the Museum's Collection, The Museum of Fine Arts, Houston, Houston, Texas
