= Anthony Ikhazoboh =

Nigerian general, politician, and football executive

Anthony Onomoaso Ikazoboh
- Died: 27 July 1999
- Military career
- Allegiance: Nigeria
- Branch: Nigerian Air Force

Anthony Onomoaso Ikazoboh (died 27 July 1999) was a Nigerian Air Commodore, and former chairman of the Nigerian Football Association, and Minister of Youths and Sports, Minister of Sports and also Minister of Transport.

He was born in Kano, but hailed from Agenebode in Edo state.
