= Guosa =

Constructed language created on the basis of several Nigerian languages

- Guosa
- Created by: Alex Igbineweka
- Date: 1965
- Setting and usage: intended for use in West Africa
- Purpose: constructed language: international auxiliary language; Guosa
- Sources: a posteriori language, derived primarily from Hausa, Yoruba, and Igbo.

Language codes
- ISO 639-2: none
- ISO 639-3: qgs (local use)
- Glottolog: None
- IETF: art-x-guosa (local use)

Guosa is a constructed interlanguage originally created by Alex Igbineweka in 1965. It was designed to be a combination of the indigenous languages of Nigeria and to serve as a lingua franca to West Africa.

== Linguistic Properties ==
=== Source Languages ===
Guosa draws the bulk of its vocabulary from Hausa, Yoruba, and Igbo, either taken directly or made from a combination of words from these languages. English also provides many of the more technical terms, either directly or through one of the aforementioned African languages. Additionally, several words were produced a priori via sound symbolism, e.g. meeh "sheep", yanmu-yanmu "mosquito", and wuam "eat".

The different parts of speech are often derived from specific languages. Most concrete nouns are derived from Hausa, while verbs and abstracts are derived from Igbo or Yoruba. Additionally, words from all three source languages are often fused to create a word that resembles all three. For example, the Guosa word méni "what" is derived from Hausa menini, Igbo gini, and Yoruba kini, all meaning "what".

=== Phonology ===
The exact phonological values or amount of distinct phonemes in Guosa is unknown. The consonant system is closest to that of Standard Igbo, but with a hard distinction between nasal consonants and plosives that that language lacks, and even adds prenasalized stops. It also adds the /l r w j/ of Yoruba and Hausa, but lacks the glottalized consonants of the latter.

==== Consonants ====
		Labial	Alveolar	Postalveolar/ Palatal	Velar	Labiovelar	Glottal
Nasal		m	n	(ɲ)	ŋ		
Stop/Affricate	voiceless	p	t	tʃ	k	k͡p	
Stop/Affricate	voiceless prenasalized	(ᵐp)	(ⁿt)	ⁿtʃ	ᵑk	(ᵑ͡ᵐk͡p)	
Stop/Affricate	voiced	b	d	dʒ	ɡ	ɡ͡b	
Stop/Affricate	voiced prenasalized	ᵐb	ⁿd	ⁿdʒ	ᵑɡ	ᵑ͡ᵐɡ͡b	
Fricative	voiceless	f	s	ʃ	x		h
Fricative	voiced	v	z		ɣ		
Approximant			l	j		w	
Rhotic			r				

1. /p/ and /v/ rarely appear in words of indigenous origin. They almost exclusively appear in words with an English or other foreign source.
2. It is unknown exactly how many pre-nasalized stops are actually phonemes, and which, if any, are considered consonant clusters. Several do appear word initially in common words such as: ncha "every", nkami "my", mbí "here", njika "evil", ngate "coast", and ngbà "time". All other stops do appear with a preceding nasal word medially, but it is unclear if these are pre-nasalized stops or clusters of a nasal and a stop.
3. The rhotic is either a tap or a trill.
4. Syllabic consonants can appear as separate words, such as ng (present continuous marker). These always have the mid tone.
5. The plosives, nasals (/ŋ/ exempt), the fricatives (velars exempt), the approximants, and /dʒ/ can be geminated, though minimal pairs are rare.
6. It is unknown if the palatal nasal is a phoneme or if it is simply the cluster /nj/.

==== Vowels ====
	Short vowels		Long vowels		Nasal vowels	
	Front	Back	Front	Back	Front	Back
Close	i	u	iː	uː	(ĩ)	(ũ)
Close-mid	e	o	eː	oː	(ẽ)	(õ)
Open	a		aː		(ã)	

Though Guosa once had the seven vowel system similar to that of Yoruba, the vowels /ɛ/ and /ɔ/ have seemingly been merged into their closed counterparts, giving Guosa a five vowel system like Hausa. Vowels can be either long or short, but the functional load of vowel length appears to be light, however, as very few minimal pairs exist when tone is taken into account. There are nasal vowels written with an ⟨n⟩ following a vowel, though this does not always indicate a nasal vowel. The functional load of these is also light and the vast majority of nasal vowels are short. No two words differ in both the nasality of the vowels and vowel length.

It is unknown if there are diphthongs in Guosa; all vowels could be pronounced as separate syllables, or several vowels could form diphthongs. The phonology of Yoruba, however, suggests that Guosa vowels do not form diphthongs, as almost all the words with adjacent vowels come from Yoruba, in which all vowels are pronounced separately.

==== Tone ====
There are three basic tones in Guosa: high, mid, and low; there are also two contour tones: low-rising and high-falling. Mid is left unmarked and is seemingly the default tone, high is written with an acute ⟨◌́⟩, low with a grave ⟨◌̀⟩. On short vowels the low-rising is written with a caron ⟨◌̌⟩ and high-falling with a circumflex ⟨◌̂⟩. With long vowels, the contour tones are split across the two vowels. With long vowels, the contour tones are written as two separate diacritics.

==== Elision ====
Elision takes place when two of the same vowels would be adjacent, or with certain grammatical particles. For example, when the plural marker é is placed before a word beginning with a vowel: é ómóntàkélé → émóntàkélé "little children". This elision can be written with an apostrophe when the two vowels are the same: ji inang → ji'nang "twenty four". It can also be written as an apostrophe when the elision spans two words that are not particles: sòngí ìsóngà → sòngí 'sóngà "sing a song".

==== Phonotactics ====
A syllable in Guosa is generally of the form (C)(G)V(C), though more specialized loanwords may have the structure (C)(C)(C)V(C).

=== Orthography ===
The Guosa alphabet contains 23 single letters, and several digraphs. The letters ⟨q⟩ and ⟨x⟩ are not used, and the letter ⟨c⟩ only appears in the digraph ⟨ch⟩. There used to be two vowel letters that seem to have almost completely disappeared from the current draft of the language: ⟨ẹ⟩ and ⟨ọ⟩. Other than these abandoned letters, diacritics are only used to mark the tone of vowels. The digraph ⟨ng⟩ represents /ᵑg/ word-initially and possibly word-medially, but word-finally it represents /ŋ/

Letter	IPA
a	/a/
b	/b/
d	/d/
e	/e/
f	/f/
g	/ɡ/
h	/h/
i	/i/
j	/d͡ʒ/
k	/k/
l	/l/
m	/m/
n	/n/
o	/o/
p	/p/
r	/r/
s	/s/
t	/t/
u	/u/
v	/v/
w	/w/
y	/j/
z	/z/

The confirmed digraphs are:

Digraph	IPA
ch	/t͡ʃ/
gb	ɡ͡b
gh	/ɣ/
kh	/x/
kp	k͡p
ng	/ŋ/, /ᵑk/
sh	/ʃ/

=== Grammar ===
Guosa is an isolating language with subject–verb–object word order. Most grammatical meaning is expressed through particles that precede the words they modify, such as é (plural), ng (present progressive), lá (perfective aspect), and kà (volitive). There are no articles. Adjectives follow the noun. There is no grammatical gender or noun class system. Guosa is generally prepositional.

==== Pronouns ====
Some Guosa pronouns, unlike the rest of the words in the language, change depending on whether they are the subject or object. Animacy is not distinguished in pronouns, but plural is, and gender is distinguishable, albeit it is optional and only makes the distinction between female and male/neuter. The following is a known list of pronouns. Some of them are defined ambiguously, so the exact pronouns are unknown.

		subject	object/genitive
1st person singular		mò (I)	mí (me/mine)
2nd person singular		o (you, thou)	yín (you/your, thee/thy)
3rd person singular	masculine/neuter	ó (he, it)	ya (him/his, it/its)
3rd person singular	feminine	ta (she)	ta (she/her)
1st person plural		àwá (we)	'wá, kewá (us/our)
2nd person plural		ee (you all)	éyín (you all/all of your)
3rd person plural		ha, fa, su (they)	ha, fa, su (them/their)

An intensive form of the pronoun us created by affixing the suffix -wan. Though possessive is often indicated by simply having the object form of the pronoun follow the noun, the preposition nke "of" can be used to indicate unambiguous possession.

==== Descriptors ====
Adjectives and adverbs are not separate classes in Guosa and are jointly called descriptors, following whatever they modify. Some descriptors only act as adjectives or adverbs, however.

In Guosa there are four regular degrees of comparison. The word jù "more" is used to form a comparative from an adjective: rámá "good" → rámá jù "better". The superlative simply combines the adverb khà "very" with jù: rámá jù khà "best" (lit. very more good). Finally, there is a forth degree of comparison above superlative. Though the superlative might indicate the highest of value in a certain group, the degree indicated by the category higher than the superlative shows that the indicated noun is the absolute best in its entire category; this is done with the khàkáa: rubi "bad" → rubi jù khàkáa "the very worst".

==== Verbs ====
In Guosa, all verbs have one form; there is no conjugation. There is a copula, wù, but it is only used with a predicate noun. With predicate adjectives however, wù is not used, and the adjective behaves more like a verb. Compare the sentences mò wù mámbézè "I am a king" with mò rámá "I am well".

There are several particles that modify the tense, aspect, and mood of verbs. These particles usually precede the verbs they modify, but the particle lá follows the verb instead.

- ng (present continual): mó sòngí 'sóngà "I sing a song" → mó ng sòngí 'sóngà "I am singing a song"
- tí (perfect): mò jòndú "I sit" → mò tí jòndú "I have sat"

The particle lá is used in a slightly different way, creating an adjective that functions similarity to an active past participle. This form can also take a direct object.

- mó kùndé "I wake up" → mó kùndé lá "I am awake"

==== Numerals ====
Guosa has a base ten number system. The cardinal numerals are:

1. dáyá "one"
2. ejì "two"
3. ètá "three"
4. ìnàng "four"
5. ìsén "five"
6. ìsíì "six"
7. asáà "seven"
8. asáto "eight"
9. essé "nine"
10. góma "ten"

The multiples of ten are derived by shortening the first ten numbers.

1. gó "ten, -teen" (used in the numbers 11–19)
2. jì "twenty"
3. tá "thirty"
4. nà "forty"
5. sén "fifty"
6. síì "sixty"
7. sá "seventy"
8. sát "eighty"
9. ssé "ninety"

The number multiples of one hundred are created by using the reduplicated gogo root. These numbers are not treated as compounds, unlike the number 11–99.

- ejì gógó "two hundred"
- asáà gógó "seven hundred"

The ordinal numbers are formed by using the preposition nke.

- nke dáyá "first"
- nke sáètá "seventy third"
- nke asáà gógó "seven hundredth"

==== Word formation ====
Guosa uses a couple particles to derive words from others. For example:

ò - agent, person characterized by the root. In the plural, this is è.

- kózí "to teach" → ò kózí "teacher", è kózí "teachers"
- gwùebí "hungry" → ò gwùebí "hungry person", è gwùebí "hungry people"
- mákárántá "school" → ò mákárántá "student", è mákárántá "students"

ì - forms both the noun and adjective from a verbal or other noun root:

- bísí "to succeed" → ìbísí "success, successful"
- kózí "to teach" → ìkózí "lesson"
- rùshé "to work" → ìrùshé "work, labor"
- máchè "woman" → ìmáchè "womanhood, womanly"

Much of the word derivation in Guosa is done using just these two particles.

=== Examples ===
bìa kà ‘wá jé àbínchí.
'come, let's eat food.'

ò chètó ájì ‘wá shìengá la gídá.
'our class monitor has left to go home.'

ó shìhé la kófà?
'have you opened the door?'

báasì, mó shìhé la kófà.
'yes, I have opened the door.'

bíko, fún mi ní rúwá.
'please, give me water'

== Usage ==
Guosa lessons have been given at the University of Abuja. An AI-powered automated interface to translate text from English into Guosa, is also available online.

There is also a Fandom wiki in Guosa, created by Vicente Costalago in July 2023 with the help of Alex Igbineweka.

== Criticism ==
Guosa has been criticized for lacking guiding principles in its design, arbitrarily selecting its words from a few Nigerian languages, rather than proportionally and methodically selecting its vocabulary from a larger variety of Nigeria's languages.
