= Ambruse Vanzekin =

Nigerian footballer

Personal information
- Full name: Ambrose Vanzekin
- Date of birth: 14 July 1986 (age 40)
- Place of birth: Nigeria
- Height: 1.76 m (5 ft 9 in)
- Position: Goalkeeper

Team information
- Current team: Warri Wolves F.C.
- Number: 1

Youth career
- Plateau United

Senior career*
Years	Team	Apps	(Gls)
2004–2006	Plateau United		
2006–2008	Bendel Insurance F.C.	23	(0)
2008–2009	Akwa United F.C.		
2009–2015	Warri Wolves F.C.		

International career
2003	Nigeria U-17	3	(0)
2005	Nigeria U-20	7	(0)
2008	Nigeria U-23	6	(0)
Medal record
Men's Football
Representing Nigeria
Olympic Games
Silver medal – second place	2008 Beijing	Team competition
- * Club domestic league appearances and goals

Ambruse Vanzekin (born 14 July 1986) is a former Nigerian football goalkeeper who played primarily for Warri Wolves F.C. He is from Uokha in Owan east local government of Edo State.

== Career ==
Vanzekin began his career with Plateau United before scouted to Bendel Insurance F.C. in 2006. He left Insurance in January 2008 and moved to Akwa United F.C. until they were relegated after the 2008–09 season. Vanzekin left his club Akwa United F.C. in July 2009 to sign for Warri Wolves.

== International ==
He was a member of the silver medalist Nigeria U-23 team at the 2008 Summer Olympics and a member of both the U-17 team at 2003 FIFA U-17 World Championship and the U-20 team at 2005 FIFA World Youth Championship, where they were runners-up, losing to Argentina 1–2 in the final match.

== Honors ==
- FIFA U-20 World Cup runner-up: 2005
- Summer Olympics runner-up: 2008
