= Abiola Irele =

Nigerian literary scholar (1936–2017)

- Born: 22 May 1936; Uokha, Nigeria
- Died: 2 July 2017 (aged 81); Cambridge, Massachusetts, USA
- Other name: Francis Abiola Irele
- Education: Ibadan University; University of Paris, Sorbonne
- Occupation: Academic
- Known for: Africanist literary scholar

Francis Abiola Irele (commonly Abiola Irele, 22 May 1936 – 2 July 2017) was a Nigerian academic best known as the doyen of Africanist literary scholars worldwide. He was Provost at Kwara State University, founded in 2009 in Ilorin, Nigeria. Before moving back to Nigeria, Irele was visiting professor of African and African American Studies and of Romance Languages and Literatures at Harvard University.

== Early life ==
Abiola Irele was born in Igbo-Ora, Nigeria, and moved to Enugu very early in his life. His father was from Uokha while his mother was from Ora, both in Owan area of Edo State. The first language he learned was Igbo, which he learned from the servants who worked for his father and took care of him growing up. After moving to Lagos in 1940, he began to speak Yoruba. In 1943, after a fight between his parents, Irele returned with his mother to Ora, where he picked up and developed a fluency in the Ora language over the course of a year. However, after returning to Lagos in 1944 to live with his father, he began predominantly to speak Yoruba and maintained it as his ethnic identification.

Irele's first encounter with literature was through folk tales and the oral poets who recounted "raras" in the streets. During the years of his formal education, he began to read more English literature.

== Education and career ==
Irele graduated from Ibadan University in 1960. Immediately after graduation, he went to Paris to learn French, and in 1966 completed a Ph.D. in French at the University of Paris, Sorbonne. On his return to Nigeria, he was employed on the Languages Faculty at the University of Lagos, and then at the University of Ghana, Legon. While at the University of Lagos, he edited the student journal The Horn, founded by his classmate John Pepper Clark, which published early writings by the likes of Chinua Achebe, Wole Soyinka and Christopher Okigbo.

From 1968 until 1975, Irele was editor of Black Orpheus magazine. He also held teaching positions at the University of Ife (now Obafemi Awolowo University), and in 1975 at the University of Ibadan, where he was Chair of Languages. In 1989, he moved to Ohio State University in the U.S. as Professor of African, French and Comparative Literature.

He was Provost at Kwara State University, founded in 2009, in Ilorin, Nigeria. Before moving back to Nigeria, Irele was visiting professor of African and African American Studies and of Romance Languages and Literatures at Harvard University.

== Négritude ==
Irele helped to expound upon the understanding of Négritude first theorized by Aimé Césaire in the magazine L'Étudiant noir and then in his groundbreaking book Cahier d'un retour au pays natal (1939), in various articles, such as "A Defence of Negritude" in Transition magazine (1964) or in the article "What is Negritude?" (1977). In his article, Irele defines Négritude as "the literary and ideological movement of French-speaking black intellectuals, which took form as a distinctive and significant aspect of the comprehensive reaction of the black man to the colonial situation...".

In his 2008 collection of essays Négritude et condition africaine, Irele explores the question of African thought. He begins by rejecting the notion of ideological difference between anglophone and francophone Africa. He aims to root African progress in the present and not in a romanticized past.

== Death ==
Irele died at the age of 81 on 2 July 2017 in a US hospital. Tributes to him included a poem by Wole Soyinka.

== Selected publications ==
- The African Imagination: Literature in Africa and the Black Diaspora, Oxford University Press (paperback 2001), ISBN 0-19-508619-8.
- The African Experience in Literature and Ideology, Indiana University Press (reprint 1990), ISBN 0-253-33124-2.
- Co-editor with Simon Gikandi of The Cambridge History of African and Caribbean Literature, Cambridge University Press (2004), ISBN 0-521-59434-0.
- "Négritude: Literature and ideology" in The African Philosophy Reader, ISBN 0-415-96809-7.
- Négritude et condition africaine, Éditions Karthala, 2008, ISBN 9782811100339.
