= Uokha =

Town in Nigeria

Coordinates: 7.0730°N 6.0473°E

Uokha lies on the latitude 7 07’N and longitude 6 04’E in a deciduous derived rainforest zone of Edo State. The climate is sub humid tropical with an average annual rainfall of about 1967mm. Uokha is a town in Owan East, a local government area of Edo state, Nigeria. It is located about 123 km northwest of Benin city the capital city. It has a population of approximately 10,000 inhabitants.

== History ==
Uokha is believed to have been founded by Prince Odion the first son of Oba Eweka 1 of Benin Kingdom. According to oral traditions Prince Odion went on a hunting expeditions northward towards the Kukuruku hills in present-day Edo North senatorial district, and it was during this time that the throne became vacant. After days of waiting the palace's chiefs had no choice than to crown his younger brother Prince Omo as the next Oba of Benin.

Unfortunate Prince Odion came back to the palace and met his younger brother crowned as the new Oba and out of annoyance he went back into the forest migrated northward towards the Kukuruku hills and settled in the present day location of Uokha. The present day people are predominantly farmers, and are known to grow food crops such as yams, cassava, and cash crops like cocoa, bananas, plantain, cashews etc.

INSTITUTIONS AND INFRASTRUCTURES

Uokha is home to:

Odion Primary School

Eweka Primary School

Uokha Grammar School

== Notable people ==
- Ambruse Vanzekin – Nigerian football goalkeeper
- Abiola Irele – Professor and former Vice Chancellor, Kwara State University
- Felix Ohis Uduokhai – footballer in the German league.

•Maria Irele- A prominent banker who was once associated with the now defunct People's Bank of Nigeria.

•Sir Greg Uanseru- Billionaire business man and the chief executive officer of GCA Energy Nig Ltd.
