= Agenebode =

Agenebode Weppa Wanno Etsako East
- Location in Nigeria
- Coordinates: 7°06′N 6°42′E
- Country: Nigeria
- State: Edo
- LGA: Etsako East
- Climate: Aw

Agenebode is a historical water-side town located by the banks of the Niger River in Edo State, South South part of Nigeria. It is the headquarters of Etsako-East local Gornment Area, The host of the local council and the traditional capital of Weppa Wanno Clan/Kingdom.

== Location ==
Agenebode is bounded by Ivioghe, Egor, Emokweme villages, and the River Niger. Agenebode city is the ancestral home city of all Weppa and Wanno people, both at home and in the diaspora. There’s a general market at the center of the city and people attend every five days to buy fresh groceries. People are friendly and content in Agenebode.

Agenebode is divided into different quarters, which are called Ighaewo, Egbado, Otoukwe, Igegbode (upland). The major town are Emokweme, Egor and Ivioghe villages, Iviebua Igbagba and Agiele.

== History ==
Agenebode is a contraction of the Edo words Ago-ni-ba-ode - “Camp of the guard” - Ago camp; ni - those; ha - watch; Ode - road or way: for those watching the Road”. It is a historic town located in northern Edo State and forms part of the Etsako East Local Government Area. The town is primarily inhabited by the Uwanno subgroup of the Afemai Afenmai people, who trace their origins to migrations from the ancient Benin Kingdom. Historical traditions and cultural links suggest that many Etsako communities, including those in Agenebode, descend from Benin warriors, hunters, and nobles who migrated northward during various phases of the Benin Empire's expansion.

Agenebode was the regional headquarters of the Royal Niger Company, a mercantile company owned by the British Colonialists and currently the headquarters of Etsako East Local Government Area of Edo State.

== Educational institutions ==
Educational institutions at Agenebode are the College of Agriculture and Fisheries, St. Peters Grammar School, Progress Secondary School, Providence Secondary School, Army Day Secondary School, Sacred Heart College, Catholic Junior Seminary School,Omoaze Primary school, and so many other secondary and primary schools. Agenebode house a Nigerian Supply and Transport barracks of the Nigerian Army, and a Division of the Nigerian Police Force. The King of the Weppa Wanno Kingdom is called the Okumagbe which is translated as the unifier, and his palace is situated at Agenebode Upland. The stool of the Okumagbe is rotated among the five kinship groups. Presently (Dr) George Oshiapi Egabor, JP, PhD, OON a chartered accountant and industrialist from the Iviokpisa kinship group, is the current Okumagbe of the Weppa Wanno; his title is OMOAZE 1.

Residents of Agenebode are predominantly Christians as the first catholic mission in Mid-Western Nigeria was located at Agenebode in 1882. There are also Muslims and traditional worshippers.

== Tourists attraction ==
Interesting sites in Agenebode are the post office, built in 1930, the Colonial Court on Mission Road, the Sacred Heart Catholic Church, the Local Council office, the Army Barracks, General Hospital, Niger Valley Farms, the River Niger banks, the Notre Dam Hospital, and the Convent.

The main means of transportation in Agenebode is by motorcycles, buses and cars. Canoes, boats and ferries transport people across the River Niger to Idah in Kogi State.

Traditional occupations of the people are farming, fishing and canoe-building. Local agriculture produces maize, nuts, groundnuts, sorghum, rice, vegetables, potatoes, Cassava, Yam, fruits etc.

The local cuisine are-Corn Soup (Omi-ukpoka), peanuts soup (omi-sagwe), melon soup (okotipio), fresh fish soup (omi-esegbomi) etc.; these soup can either be eaten with pounded yam, Eba, Fufu etc.; Agenebode people drink locally made gin (ukakai) and fresh palm wine.
