= Julius Momo Udochi =

Nigerian politician

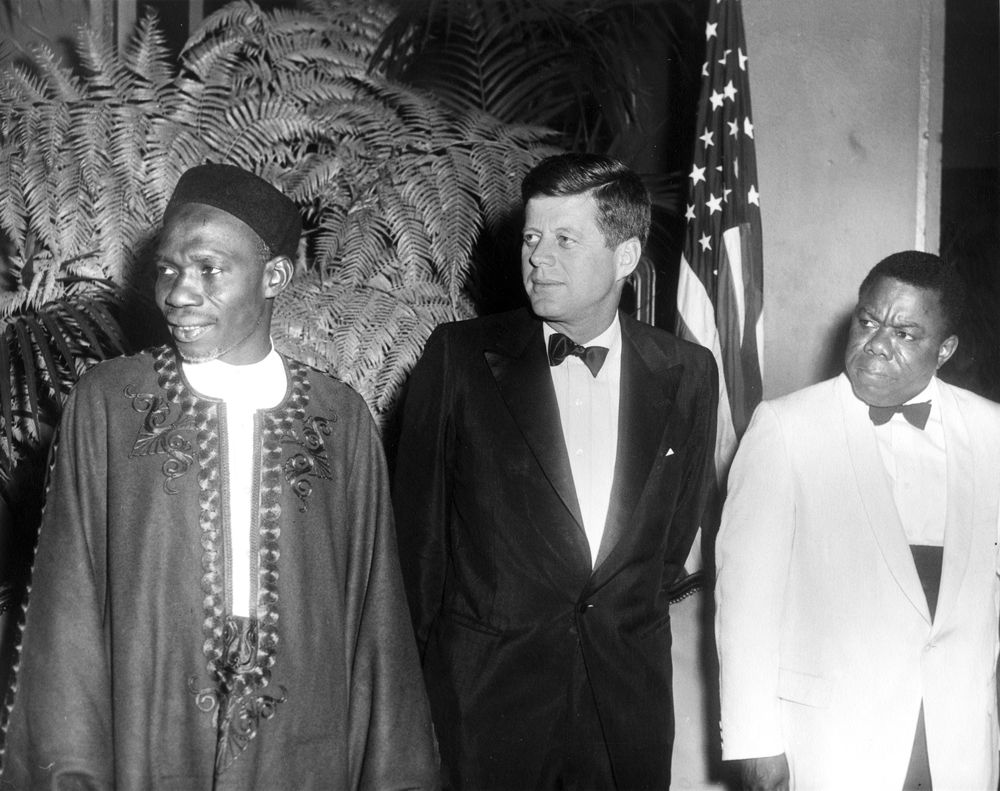
Julius Momo Udochi (far right), beside President Kennedy and Prime Minister Abubakar Tafawa Balewa

Chief Julius Momo Udochi was the first Nigerian Ambassador to the United States of America, 1960–1965. He was a Teacher 1931–1938; a Customs Officer in the Nigerian Civil Service 1938–1945; Assistant secretary, Nigerian Secretariat 1945–1947; Hon. Provincial Secretary Nigerian Civil Service Union, Co-Editor "The Nigerian Civil Servant" 1939–1945; Called to the English Bar as a Barrister at Law by the Middle Temple in 1950; He practiced Law 1950–1960; was Chairman of the Federal Non-Government Teacher's Salary Commission and a Member of the Mission to the World Bank, 1958; Hon. Secretary of the Nigerian Bar Association and Member of the Committee on Legal Education, 1955–1959; Member of the House of Representatives of Nigeria, 1954-1959 and 1965–1966. First Nigerian Ambassador to the United States of America, 1960–1965; Hon. Attorney-General and Commissioner of Justice, Mid-Western State of Nigeria, 1967–1975.
