= Provinces of Nigeria =

Administrative divisions, 1900 to 1967

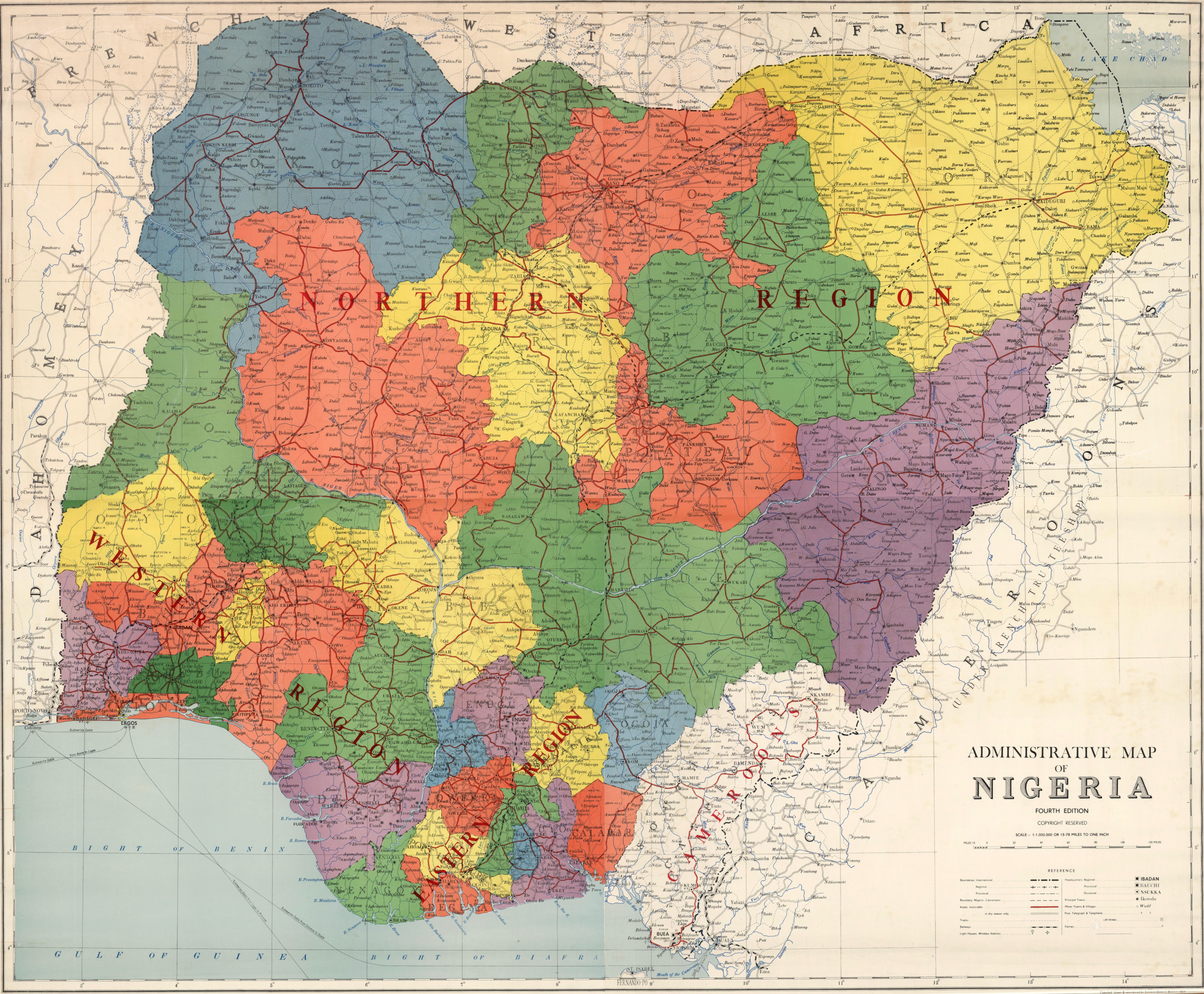
Map showing the regions and provinces of colonial Nigeria in 1924

The Provinces of Nigeria were administrative divisions in Nigeria, in use from 1900 to 1967 in Colonial Nigeria and shortly after independence. They were altered many times through their history. They were divided into divisions; some of these were further subdivided into native authorities. Northern Nigeria and Southern Nigeria were also sometimes known as the Northern Provinces or Southern Provinces respectively. Currently, Nigeria is a federation of 36 states.

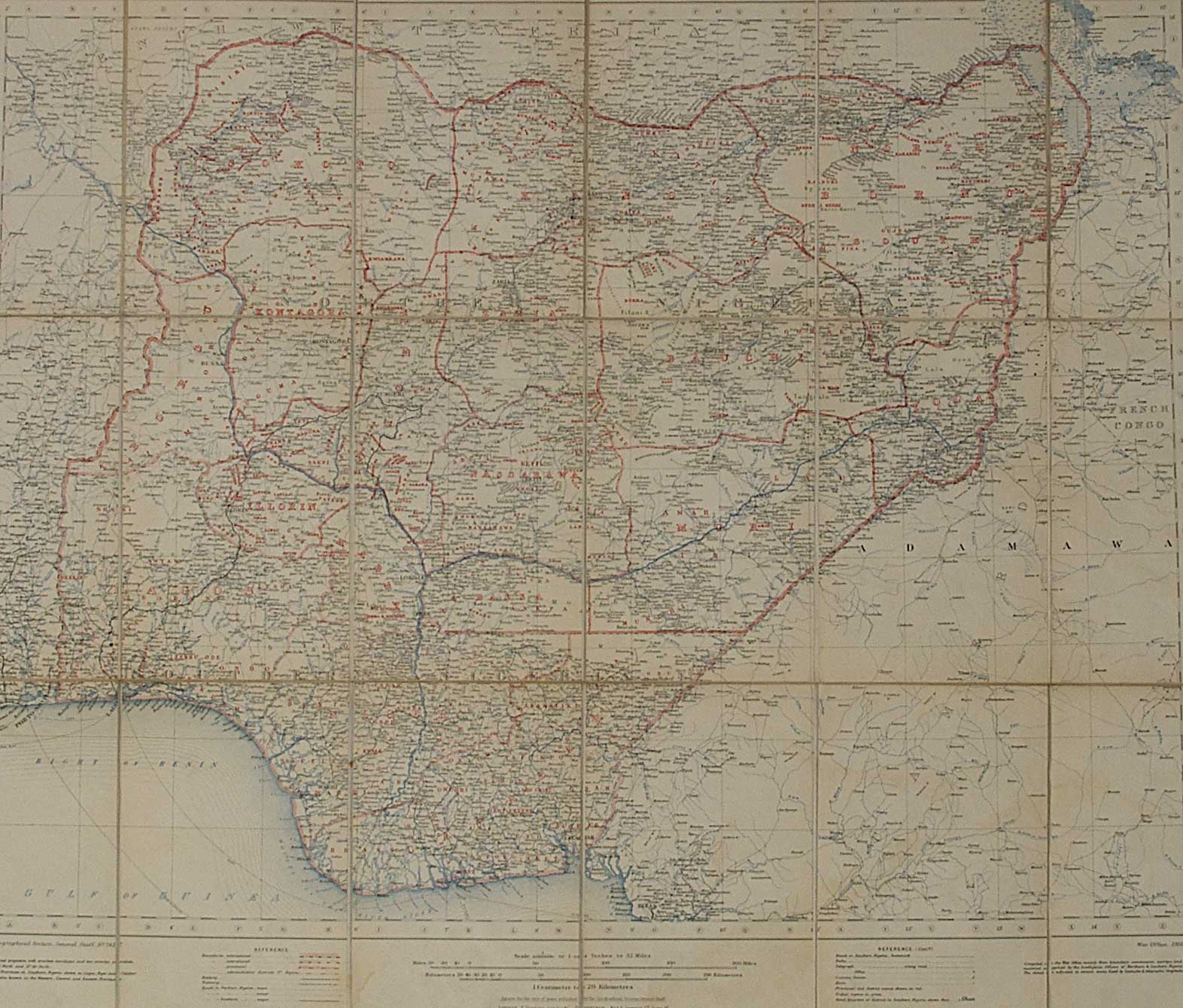
Map of the provinces of Nigeria in 1910

The first use of provinces was in Northern Nigeria after Britain took over administration of the area from the Royal Niger Company in 1900. The British originally divided the area into eleven provinces which were:

- Bauchi
- Bida
- Bornu
- Kabba
- Kontagora
- Lower Benue or Nassarawa
- Illorin
- Muri
- Sokoto
- Upper Bema
- Zaria

In 1903 six more provinces were added; five following the Sokoto-Kano campaign, and also Gwandu province, making a total of 17. The number of provinces was reduced to 13 in 1911, and 12 after World War I. In 1926 Adamawa and Plateau became new provinces. The provinces and divisions in 1945, with the names or number of Native Authorities in each division:

Province	Region	Division	Native Authorities
Abeokuta	Western	Egba	Abeokuta
Abeokuta	Western	Egbado	5
Adamawa	Northern	Adamawa	Adamawa
Adamawa	Northern	Muri	Muri
Adamawa	Northern	Numan	Numan, Shellen
Bauchi	Northern	Bauchi	Bauchi, Dass, Ningi
Bauchi	Northern	Gombe	
Bauchi	Northern	Katagum	
Benin	Western	Asaba	23
Benin	Western	Benin	Benin
Benin	Western	Ishan	11
Benin	Western	Kukuruku, later Afenmai	36
Benue	Northern	Idoma	21
Benue	Northern	Lafia	Awe, Lafia
Benue	Northern	Nasarawa	Keffi, Nasarawa
Benue	Northern	Tiv	55
Benue	Northern	Wukari	6
Bornu	Northern	Bedde	Bedde
Bornu	Northern	Biu	3
Bornu	Northern	Bornu	Bornu
Bornu	Northern	Dikwa	Dikwa
Bornu	Northern	Potiskum	Fika
Calabar	Eastern	Abak	8
Calabar	Eastern	Calabar	3
Calabar	Eastern	Eket	7
Calabar	Eastern	Enyong Aro	5
Calabar	Eastern	Enyong Itu	5
Calabar	Eastern	Ikot Ekpene	4
Calabar	Eastern	Opobo	4
Calabar	Eastern	Uyo	9
Cameroons	Eastern	Bamenda	23
Cameroons	Eastern	Kumba	12
Cameroons	Eastern	Mamfe	7
Cameroons	Eastern	Victoria	3
Ijebu	Western	Ijebu-Ode	Ijebu-Ode, Ijebu-Remo
Ilorin	Northern	Borgu	Bussa, Kaiama
Ilorin	Northern	Ilorin	Ilorin
Ilorin	Northern	Pategi-Lafiagi	Lafiagi, Pategi
Kabba	Northern	Igala	5
Kabba	Northern	Igbirra	Igbirra
Kabba	Northern	Kabba	5
Kabba	Northern	Koton Karifi	4
Kano	Northern	Kano	Kanu,
Kano	Northern	Hadejia	Gumel, HadejiaKazaure
Katsina	Northern	Katsina	Daura, Katsina
Niger	Northern	Abuja	Abuja, Lapai
Niger	Northern	Bida	Agaie, Bida
Niger	Northern	Kontagora	Kontagora, Wushishi, Zuru
Niger	Northern	Minna	Gwari, Kamuku
Ogoja	Eastern	Abakaliki	6
Ogoja	Eastern	Afikpo	11
Ogoja	Eastern	Ikom	9
Ogoja	Eastern	Obobra	9
Ogoja	Eastern	Ogoja	12
Ondo	Western	Ekiti	16
Ondo	Western	Okitipupa	5
Ondo	Western	Ondo	3
Ondo	Western	Owo	6
Onitsha	Eastern	Awka	9
Onitsha	Eastern	Awgu	3
Onitsha	Eastern	Onitsha	20
Onitsha	Eastern	Nsukka	8
Onitsha	Eastern	Udi	3
Owerri	Eastern	Aba	3
Owerri	Eastern	Bende	1
Owerri	Eastern	Okigwi	2
Owerri	Eastern	Orlu	5
Owerri	Eastern	Owerri	22
Oyo	Western	Ibadan	Ibadan
Oyo	Western	Ife-Ilesha	Ife, Ilesha
Oyo	Western	Oyo	Oyo
Plateau	Northern	Jema'a	Jema'a
Plateau	Northern	Jos	5
Plateau	Northern	Pankshin	22
Plateau	Northern	Shendam	Wase, 6 others
Plateau	Northern	Southern	Eggon, Nunku, Wamba
Rivers	Eastern	Ahoada	7
Rivers	Eastern	Brass	3
Rivers	Eastern	Degema	4
Rivers	Eastern	Ogoni	1
Sokoto	Northern	Argungu	Argungu
Sokoto	Northern	Gwandu	Gwandu, Yauri
Sokoto	Northern	Sokoto	Sokoto
Warri	Western	Aboh	3
Warri	Western	Warri	3
Warri	Western	Urhobo	28
Warri	Western	Western Ijaw	13
Zaria	Northern	Zaria	Zaria, 4 others

There were thirteen provinces in Northern Nigeria in 1966 which were abolished in May 1967:

- Bauchi
- Benue
- Borno
- Ilorin
- Kano
- Katsina
- Plateau
- Zaria
- Niger
- Adamawa
- Kabba
- Sokoto
- Sardauna
