= Ihievbe =

Town in Edo state, Nigeria

Ihievbe (also spelled Sebe or Isebe) is a town in Owan East local government area of Edo State, Nigeria, Africa with a population of approximately 50,000 people. Geographically, it is between Auchi and Afuze. The name Ihievbe is commonly misspelled in maps and some other literature as Sebe or Isebe. The people of Ihievbe speak the Ihievbe language, a dialect of Edoid as the native language, and English as the common language. Ihievbe are Afemai people. As with the rest of Nigeria, there are two main religions, Christian and Muslim. The subsistence of the people from Ihievbe is mostly based on agriculture and animal husbandry. the ihievbe community was founded by Obo ca.1504—1536, a contemporary of Prince Uguan and according to narrative tradition related to Uzuanbi of Emai. Obo was further related to a junior branch of the royal clan of Benin.
