= Etsako Central =

- LGA
- Interactive map of Etsako Central
- Country: Nigeria
- State: Edo State
- Capital: Fugar

Area
  - Total: 660 km^{2} (250 sq mi)

Population (2006)
  - Total: 94,229
  - Density: 140/km^{2} (370/sq mi)
- Time zone: UTC+1 (WAT)
- Postal code: 312

Etsako Central is one of the 18 Local Government Areas of Edo State, Nigeria. Its headquarters is in the town of Fugar. It is represented in the Edo state house of assembly by Ahmed Waziri Oshomah of the APC.

Notable towns in Etsako Central include Fugar, Ogbona, Iraokhor, Anegbete, and Ekperi.

It has an area of 659.7 km^{2} and a population of 94,229 in the 2006 census. The common language of the people in the Etsako central local area is the Afemai language while Islam and Christianity are the religion practiced by majority of the people. The local government area is located in the northern part of Edo State.

The postal code of the area is 312.

== Localities ==
Towns and zip codes
Ape	312108
Apeabebe	312108
Atavo	312108
Awuyemi	312113
Imiekhuri	312113
Iviakpela	312108
Iviochie	312109
Ogbago	312108
Sabogida	312111
Ukhomoduba	312110

== Economy ==
About 60% of the population of Estako Central local government area are farmers, hunters and fishermen. The types of crops grown in the area are yam, cassava, groundnut and maize. Other important commercial activities in the area are wood carving, blacksmith, and small scale business during weekly market days for buying and selling.

== Geography and climate ==
Etsako Central LGA spans about 660 square kilometres or 250 square miles and experiences two main seasons: the dry season and the rainy season.

== Culture ==
Estako Central's culture is manifested in the inhabitants' mode of religious worship, folklore, dance, arts and crafts, festivals, etc. There are three religious groups namely Christianity, Islam and traditional worship.
