= Afenmai language =

Edoid language spoken in Nigeria

Yekhee
- Afenmai; Kukuruku (outdated)
- Etsakọ
- Native to: Nigeria
- Region: Edo State
- Ethnicity: Afenmai
- Native speakers: 510,000 (2020)
- Language family: Niger–Congo?: Atlantic–Congo; Volta–Niger; yeai; Edoid; North-Central; Yekhee–Ghotuo; Yekhee

Language codes
- ISO 639-3: ets
- Glottolog: yekh1238

Afenmai (Afemai), Yekhee, or Iyekhe, is an Edoid language spoken in Edo State, Nigeria by the Afenmai people. Not all speakers recognize the name Yekhee; some use the district name Etsako.

Previously the name used by British colonial administration was Kukuruku, supposedly after a battle cry "ku-ku-ruku", now considered derogatory.

Afenmai is unusual in reportedly having a voiceless tapped fricative as the "tense" equivalent of the "lax" voiced tap /ɾ/ (compare [aɾ̞̊u] 'hat' and [aɾu] 'louse'), though in other descriptions it is described simply as a fricative and analyzed as the "lax" equivalent of the "tense" voiceless stop /t/.

== Phonology ==
Vowels are /i e ɛ a ɔ o u/. Long vowels and the large number of diphthong in the language are derived from sequences of short vowels, often from the optional elision of /l/.

Afenmai has a complex system of morphotonemic alterations based on two phonemic tones, high and low. At the surface level there are five distinctive tones: high, low, falling, rising and mid. Mid tone is the result of downstep of a high tone after a low tone. The contour tones (falling and rising) either occur on long vowels or diphthongs, from a sequence of high+low or low+high, or on short vowels produced from the contraction of such a long vowel or diphthong. Rising tones are rather uncommon, as they tend to be replaced by high, low or mid.

Consonant phonemes of the Ekpheli dialect
		Labial	Dental	Alveolar	Palatal	Velar	Labiovelar
Nasal		m, mː		n			
Plosive	voiced	b		d		ɡː	ɡ͡b, ɡ͡bː
Plosive	voiceless	p		t(ː)		kː	k͡p, k͡pː
Affricate	voiced			dz			
Affricate	voiceless			ts			
Fricative	voiced	v(ː)				ɣ	
Fricative	voiceless	f	θ	s		x	
Approximant		ʋ		l	j		w
Tap				ɾ			

The consonants marked as geminated have been analyzed in various ways, including 'tense' or 'fortis' and paired up with 'lax' or 'lenis' partners, though there is no phonological basis for grouping the supposed 'long' consonants together, or for partnering them with particular 'short' consonants. The clear cases are /k͡pː ɡ͡bː mː/, which are twice as long as /k͡p ɡ͡b m/ but otherwise identical in a spectrogram. /kː ɡː/ are likewise twice as long as /x ɣ/. However, alveolar /t/ is only slightly longer than dental /θ/, and while /v/ is longer than /ʋ/, that's to be expected for a fricative compared to an approximant.

The alveolar consonants have postalveolar allophones before /i/ plus another vowel, where /i/ would otherwise become [j], as in /siɛsiɛ/ > [ʃɛʃɛ] 'to be small'. In addition, /ts/ optionally becomes [tʃ] before a single /i/, as in /itsi/ 'pig' ([itsi] ~ [itʃi]). The other alveolar consonants do not have this variation, unless the triggering environment is provided within a prosodic word: /odzi/ 'crab' ([odzi] in citation form) > /odzi oɣie/ 'the king's crab' ([odʒoɣje]). The sounds transcribed with ⟨ʃ ʒ ɲ⟩ may actually be closer to [ɕ ʑ nʲ].

Apart from /p ts dz θ/, these consonants appear in all dialects of Afenmai investigated by Elimelech (1976). /p/ is absent from Uzairue dialect, being replaced by /f/, and is quite rare in most other dialects. /ts dz/ are fricativized to /s z/ in Aviele and South Uneme dialects. /θ/ is retracted to /ɹ̝̊/ in most other dialects, as in [aθu ~ aɹ̝̊u] 'hat'.

== Orthography ==
Afenmai Alphabet (Alfabẹti Etsakọ)
A	B	C	CH	D	E	Ẹ	F	G	GB	GH	GW	I	J	K	KH	KP	KPH	KW	L
M	MH	N	NW	NY	O	Ọ	P	R	S	SH	T	TH	TS	U	V	VH	W	Y	Z

== Phrases ==
Etsako phrases include:

Etsako	English
Moo!	Well done
Abee!/See!	Hello (How is it?)
O somi/O chi	It is good. (Response)
Na ẹgbia	Good morning
Na ẹlẹ	(Response)
Agbelọ	Good morning
Agbe	(Response)
U vhẹẹ ze?	Hope you are fine.
Eli	Yes
U lẹ guẹ?	Did you sleep well?
A kpẹmi	We give thanks
Moo ota / Oviẹna / Togi	Good afternoon
Moo ogode / Obugala	Good evening
O ki akọ / O kila akhuẹ	Good night (until tomorrow)
O ki la	Goodbye
O ki idegbe	Until later
Lẹ khia / Guẹ khia	Go well.
R'ẹlo ku egbe	Take care.

Common Etsako phrases showing dialectical variations between Iyekhe and Agbelo:

English	Iyekhe	Agbelo
I am coming	I bade	Mi aa balẹ
Where are you?	Obo u ya?	Obo u la?
Where are you going to?	Obo u ye?	Obo u aa ye?
What do you want?	Eme u kele?	Elọ u aa nono?
This is my brother	Iyọkpa mẹ ki ọna	Inyọguo mẹ kh' ọna
I am hungry	Osami ọ gbe mẹ	Okiami o aa gbe mẹ
