= Owan East =

Local Government Area of Edo State, Nigeria

- LGA
- Interactive map of Owan East
- Country: Nigeria
- State: Edo State
- Capital Afuze: Afuze

Area
  - Total: 1,240 km^{2} (480 sq mi)

Population (2006)
  - Total: 154,385
  - Density: 125/km^{2} (322/sq mi)
- Time zone: UTC+1 (WAT)
- Postal code: 313
- Area code(s): 313108, 313107, 313106, 313105, 313104, 313103, 313102, 313101

Owan East is a Local Government Area of Edo State, Nigeria. The headquarters is in the town of Afuze. The Owan East Local Government Area comprises 69 towns/villages, made up of eight clans (Emai, Igue, Ake-Ievbu, Ihievbe, Ikao, Ivbi-Mion, Ive-Ada-Obi, Otuo and Uokha).

Owan-East is bordered in the north by Akoko-Edo LGA, in the east by Etsako-West LGA, at the west is Ondo State, and at the southwest by Owan-West LGA, while in the South are Esan Central LGA and Uhunmwonde LGA.

== Education ==
The local government is host to various educational institutions such as Federal University of Sports, Afuze; Edo State College of Education, Afuze campus. The Afuze campus consists of School of Physical and Health Education, and Special Needs Education as campus three.

It has an area of 1,240 km^{2} and a population of 154,385 persons (81,847 males and 72,538 females) at the 2006 census.

== Climate Condition ==
Owan East experiences both wet and dry seasons in its tropical environment, which is hot and muggy.

== Postal codes ==
The postal code of the area is 313. (Emai: 313101, Ihievbe: 313102, Ive-Ada-Obi: 313103, Uokha: 313104, Ivbi-Mion: 313105, Igue: 313106, Otuo: 313107, and Ikao: 313108)
