= Etsako East =

Etsako East Agenebode Okpella Town Okugbe
- LGA
- Nickname: Okugbe
- Motto: Agberho
- Interactive map of Etsako East Agenebode
- Country: Nigeria
- State: Edo State
- Capital: Agenebode

Area
  - Total: 1,133 km^{2} (437 sq mi)

Population (2006)
  - Total: 145,996
  - Density: 129/km^{2} (330/sq mi)
- Time zone: UTC+1 (WAT)
- Postal code: 312
- Area code: 00234

Etsako East is a local government council in Edo State, Nigeria with its headquarters at Agenebode. It has an area of 1,133 km^{2} and a population of 145,996 at the 2006 census. The postal code of the area is 312.

== Economy ==
Farming is the primary livelihood of the people in Etsako East Local Government Area, where crops like maize, yam, cassava, and plantain are commonly cultivated. Trading also plays a major role in the local economy, with several markets operating in the area, including the Imegba Central Market. In addition, Etsako East LGA has abundant mineral resources such as limestone, potassium, and coal, and it is well known for producing cement in large amounts.
