= Owan West =

- LGA
- Interactive map of Owan West
- Country: Nigeria
- State: Edo State
- Capital: Sabongida Ora

Area
  - Total: 732 km^{2} (283 sq mi)

Population (2006)
  - Total: 97,388
  - Density: 133/km^{2} (345/sq mi)
- Time zone: UTC+1 (WAT)
- Postal code: 313

Owan West is a Local Government Area of Edo State, Nigeria. Its headquarter is in the town of Sabongida Ora.

It had an area of 732 km^{2} and a population of 97,388 at the 2006 census.

The postal code of the area is 313.

== Wedding customs ==
Wedding List is the list given to the intending groom looking to marry a woman from Sabongida Ora (Owan West). Everything on the list is to be purchased and presented at the traditional wedding ceremony (this is to be fixed and agreed on before the list is given). The contents of the list vary based on the family head, the standard however are:

1. Bride's dowry (depends on the head of the family)
2. Suitcase of clothes
3. An umbrella
4. A small basin of egusi seeds
5. Twenty-one tubers of yam
6. One smoked/dried antelope
7. Twenty-one kola-nuts (double lobed)
8. One large dried fish
9. Twenty-one pieces of bitter kola
10. A keg of palm wine
11. Twenty-one pieces of alligator pepper
12. Two bottles of schnapps
13. Two bottles of dry gin
14. Two kegs of palm oil (25 litres)
15. Two bags of salt
16. One she-goat
17. A bottle of honey
18. A packet of sugar
19. Two cartons of beer
20. Two cartons of malt drink
21. Two crates each of 3 different soda drinks i.e. Cola, Pepsi, Fanta, Mirinda, Sprite etc.
- Idegbe #500 (depends on family)
- Igele #500 (depends on family)
- Erahoin #1,000 (depends on family)
- Iyanhoin #500 (depends on family)

== Towns and Villages ==
Owan West is made up of three districts which houses several villages. the districts and some of the villages are listed below: District of Iuleha -: Aropo, Avbiognula, Avbiosi, Eruere, Ikpeyan, Iloje, Ivbiodohen, Oah, Obii camp, Ogha Okpuje and so on; District of Ora -: Eme-ora, Igho-usie, Ikpafolame, Ogakha, Ogbeturu, Oke, Orbiogharin, Evibobe ora, Sobe, Uhomora and so on; District of Ozalla-: Ozalla.

== Economy ==
The crops grown in the local government includes-: Yams, Maize, Cassava, Plantain, Cocoa. According to the 1952 World Bank survey, part of our natural resources are petrol gas, black clay for ceramic industry, natural lakes for fish industry, timber and others. Owan West local government also hosts a number of market such as Evibobe market, Uhonmora market, Ikhin Market, Eme market, Uzebba market and Ozalla market.

== Festivals ==
There are several festivals celebrated in Owan West Local Government Area, which include; Obazu festival-: Obazu festival is held among the Aomas of Iuleha which is strictly restricted to men folks, Ohonomoimen festival of luleha (Owan/Oras clan,

Ivbamen or Ororuen festival of Ozalla in Owan West, Oriminyan festival of oguta-Evbiame (Owan/Ora) clan.

Economy and Occupation
