= Felix Idubor =

Nigerian sculptor

- Born: 1928
- Died: 1991 (aged 62–63)
- Known for: Sculptor
- Notable work: National Hall Door carvings
- Movement: Benin, Tourist Art Contemporary African Art

Felix Idubor (1928–1991) was a Nigerian sculptor from Benin City, a city with a rich history of artistic excellence. He was part of a young group of artists in the 1950s and 1960s who raised awareness of the artistic consciousness of African tradition in an emerging and nascent social milieu. He is sometimes considered one of the pioneers of Nigerian contemporary art. In 1966, he opened Nigeria's first contemporary art gallery in Kakawa street, Lagos.

He was very successful in door carvings and was commissioned to carve doors for prominent firms and individuals such as the Cooperative Bank building at Ibadan and the House of Parliament in Lagos.

== Early life and education ==
Felix Idubor was born to the family of a farmer in Benin city. He started carving at an early age, but met some resistance from his father who felt carving was not a financially productive career choice. He began his education at a primary school in Benin but later took a break from studies to concentrate on what he felt was his natural choice of occupation, carving. His first artistic choice of subject focused on birds usually carved in wood from the Iroko tree which were numerous in Benin. He also used the wood from the iroko tree as tools in other carving projects and was quite successful in his chosen path. By the age of seventeen, he was appointed a tutor at the Edo College in Benin with little formal training.

In the late 1950s, he earned a scholarship to study at the Royal College of Art, London after his work gained critical acclaim during an exhibition to coincide with Queen Elizabeth's visit to Nigeria.

== Sculptor ==
After the end of World War II, he left the city of Benin and moved to Lagos. However, Lagos which was then the seat of government was also an emerging economic and trade center with high standards of living. To fend for himself, Idubor turned to making tourist craft for sales to African traders and foreign tourists while also finding time to tend to his artistic and later distinctive vision of wood carvings. Although, the African tourism craft form was sometimes called traducible by some, the popularity with tourists and the effort put into training and making the craft encouraged the collecting of African art works.

By 1953, Idubor was able to hold an exhibition of his wood sculptures at the Nigerian Exhibition Center. The exhibition gave him visibility and exposure; a few of his works were bought by American collectors. His work also attracted critical attention. However, it was an exhibition opened by the Nigerian governor-general, James Robertson which was held to coincide with the visit of Queen Elizabeth that gave him increased exposure. Included in the gift presented to the queen was an Idubor wood carving. In due time, he was later a teacher at a college in Yaba and was given a scholarship to study in London.

== Door carvings ==
After returning from London, he was given his first major project, to design a door for the new Cooperative Bank building in Ibadan. The architect brought in to work on the building chose Idubor for his taste in and talent in carving. Idubor chose a design of three crops carved in wood, the three crops signified the three main regions of Nigeria. The palm fruit for the Eastern region, cocoa for the Western region and groundnut for the Northern region. The carvings were well received and further opened avenues for new clients who appreciated his work. He later worked with the office of the Oba of Lagos on a wood carving for a palace door and also with the Nigerian parliament.

== Other works ==
He also succeeded in other material subjects and also experimented with bronze sculptors and concrete casting. His carving of a Yoruba girl was on display at the Nigerian House, London and some of his works hanged as ornaments on the walls of the National Hall, Lagos. His enigmatic work depicting a woman with a crown and Coral beads on ring road, Benin was a stature that dominated the popular road.

In 1966, he opened his art gallery on Kakawa street, Lagos. IDUBOR ART GALLERY BENIN CITY. Pa Felix Idubor’s art gallery in the heart of the ancient city of Benin is one of, if not the largest art galleries in Edo State. This is where one can still find his sculptures displayed, a tourist attraction for both local and international visitors to Edo State. Since his passing April 23, 1991, his first son, Pa Ayo Idubor, has continued in the footsteps of his legendary father.
