= John Edokpolo =

John Enoyogiere Edokpolo
- Born: 9 October 1918; Benin City, Nigeria
- Died: 17 June 1996 (aged 77)
- Occupations: Businessman, political activist
- Known for: Private education in Edo State, Nigeria
- Title: Archbishop
- Children: 42 children

John Enoyogiere Edokpolo (9 October 1918 – 17 June 1996) was a Nigerian businessman in the rubber industry and founder of Edokpolo Grammar Schools in Benin City, Nigeria. Edokpolo was also a property developer who created a number of residential and commercial estates in the then Mid-Western Region, and made contributions to the rule of law that resulted in numerous precedents in cases cited today in courts throughout Nigeria.

== Early life ==
Edokpolo was born to Mr. Asemota Edokpolo, a poor herbalist and Mrs. Emeikhase Edokpolo. He could not complete his elementary education due to financial constraints. With no money to continue his education, he went into trading in various items like kerosene, bicycle and rubber. He eventually owned a rubber processing factory, Edokpolo Rubber Factory, which employed hundreds of staff and traded with S Thomopolos, a foreign firm in the rubber market.

== Political career ==
Edokpolo was one of several leaders who worked for the creation of the Mid-Western Region in 1963. He formed a political party called Mid-West Peoples Congress, and later the Mid-west Democratic Party (MDP). He was appointed Commissioner for Trade and Industry of the then mid-western region in 1963 by former Premier, Chief (Dr.) Dennis Osadebay. In this role he donated his salaries and allowances to the government.

== Episcopal career ==
Edokpolo attained the position of Archbishop in 1988. He built a church, Christian Salvation Church, Dawson Road, Benin City, where he regularly worshiped with his family, students and staff of his educational establishments.

== Educational work ==
Edokpolo built the following schools:

- Edokpolo Primary School, Benin City, 1953
- Edokpolo Secondary Modern School, Benin City, 1956
- Edokpolo Grammar School, Benin City, 1960

== Death and dispute over estate ==
Edokpolo died in 1996, and his estate became subject to a protracted legal dispute by surviving members of his family.

== Bibliography ==
- Obaisuko Atafo (1990). A biography of Archbishop Dr. John Edokpolo, J.P., ISBN 978-2846-48-1
- Osasu Ekpen Isibor (2012). John Enoyogiere Edokpolo – The eagle on the iroko, ISBN 978-978-929-416-9
