= Holy Aruosa Cathedral =

Church in Benin City, Edo, Nigeria

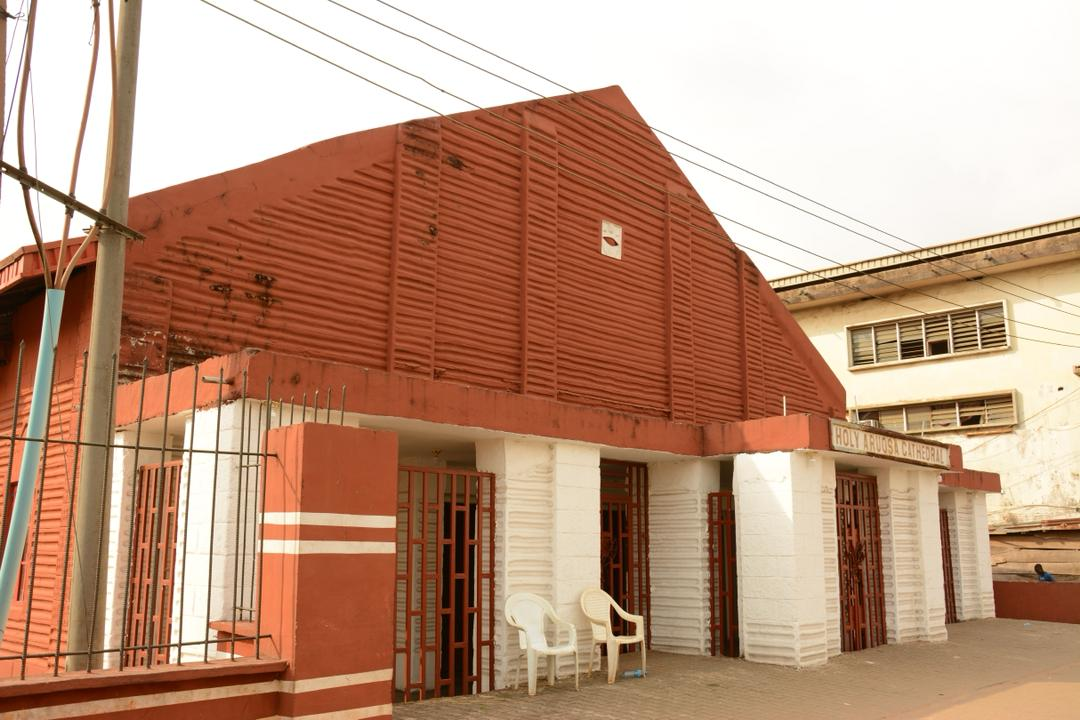
Holy Arousa Cathedral building

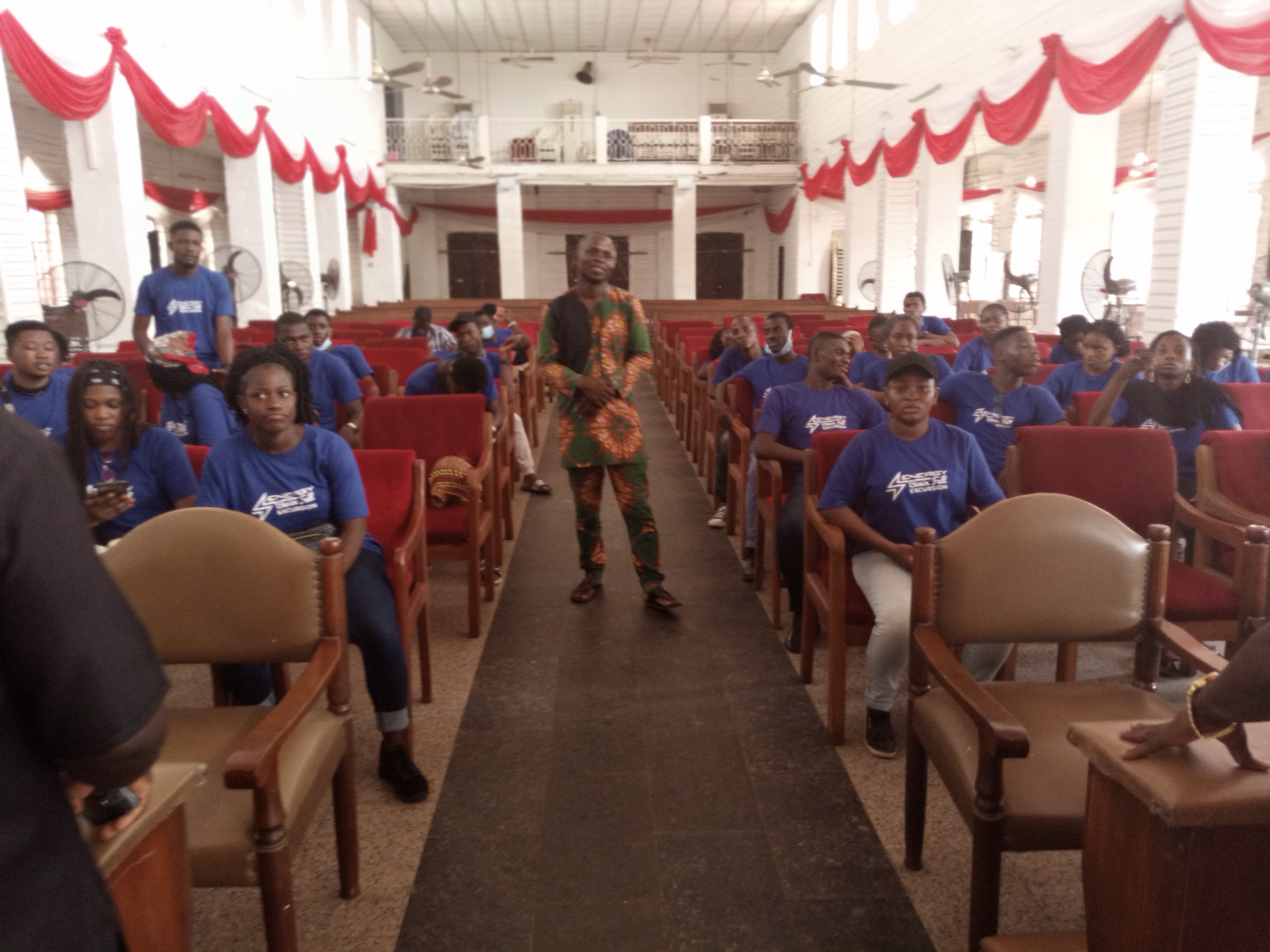
Tourists at Holy Arousa Cathedral, Benin City

Holy Aruosa Cathedral (founded in 1517) is a church located at Akpakpava in Benin City, Edo, Nigeria. It was founded by Oba Esigie (son of Queen Idia) and Portuguese missionaries. It is commonly called the church of the Oba of Benin and the elderly Binis (people of Benin). It is one of the oldest churches in Nigeria, which can be traced back to the coming of Portuguese. Just as every Abrahamic religion has a sacred book, Holy Arousa Catheral's holy book is known as the Book of Holy Aruosa which was written by the "wise men with dictate, teachings, and sayings of the ancient Benin kingdom."

== History ==
About six centuries and fifty years old, Aruosa predates early Portuguese missionary contact with the Benin kingdom, contrary to popular belief that it is a relic of missionary presence in the area. Bini believe in direct worship of the Supreme Being, Osanobua, the Bini world view permeates Aruosa's doctrine, rituals and usage.

In 1517, Holy Aruosa Cathedral, was established during the reign of Oba Esigie. Holy Aruosa serves as an historical place for both Nigerians and foreign tourists from America and Europe.
