= Francis Edo-Osagie =

Nigerian businessman from Benin City

Francis Edo Osagie
- Born: 1914; Benin City
- Died: 1993 (aged 78–79)
- Education: Baptist High School, Ibadan
- Occupation: Businessman

Francis Edo Osagie (1914-1994) was a Nigerian businessman from Benin City. He was born into an elite family; his father worked in the forestry department and was also a farmer in Benin City.

== Education and career ==
He attended the Baptist primary school in Benin City and the Baptist High School, Ibadan for secondary education. After completing his secondary education, he took on a variety of duties, from being a transport clerk to a sales agent and an accountant. It was while working as an accountant that he noticed the potential of trading in timber, especially the prospective wood resources available in the Southeastern part of the country. He left his job and formed a joint venture with two other partners to explore timber but the venture yielded little as timber prices crashed. After the closure of the venture, he started his own firm, Osagie & Sons. The new venture stayed in the timber business and finally found a successful way of selling timber. The company was advised to explore some areas where Toledo worms seemed to have caused some devastation to some trees. It was discovered that with inspection, and a little work, the core of the trees could be saved. He started exporting large-scale timber from the area to Europe and America and was very successful.

He was also an apolitical community leader, this allowed him to mediate on civil duties, particularly those affecting the oil companies, their workers, and the communities they operate in.
