= Eghosa Anglican Grammar School =

Secondary school in Nigeria

- Benin City, Edo; Nigeria

Information
- Established: 1954; 72 years ago
- Founder: Osaze Igbinokpogie

Eghosa Anglican Grammar School is a secondary school located along New Lagos road in the ancient city of Benin City, Edo State, Nigeria.

== History ==
Eghosa Anglican Grammar School was first established in 1954 as Adolor College by Osaze Igbinokpogie on a piece of land given to him by Mr. Enaruwa, with help from Oba Akenzua II, the reigning Oba of the Benin Kingdom at the time. Shortly after the establishment of the school, funding became scarce, and to avoid closing down the school, Igbinokpogie had to transfer the ownership of the school to the Anglican Mission and the name of the school became Eghosa Anglican Grammar School.

Eghosa Anglican Grammar School enrolled students in the West African School Certificate (WASC) examination for the first time in 1963. Due to its encouraging performance in the 1963 WASC examination, the school witnessed a strong and gradual growth in its students population to the extent that it was expanded from 1 arm per class to 3 arms per class in the 1965 admission year. This set of students who were admitted in 1965 subsequently graduated in 1969 in the midst of the Nigerian Civil War (from 1967 to 1970).

The school continues to witness steady growth in its population and academic performance. Then during the government of Prof. Ambrose Folorunsho Alli, the former Governor of the old Bendel state of Nigeria, all missionary schools were taken over by the Bendel state government and Eghosa Anglican Grammar School was not left out. The Bendel State government instituted a free education program which led to the sudden increase in the population of Eghosa Anglican Grammar School beyond its capacity. This led to a gradual decline in the quality of education. In 2004, the government of Edo State under Chief Lucky Igbinedion formulated a policy to return some mission schools to their original owners due to poor funding, which led to Eghosa Anglican Grammar School returning to Anglican Mission. The Eghosa Old Boys Association (EGHOBA), which is the alumni association of all former students of the school, have contributed personally and collectively to reconstruct and rehabilitate the school.

== Curriculum ==
Eghosa Anglican Grammar School has gone through many changes in its educational structure. It initially began as a boarding school with optional day students, then was converted to full day school when the Bendel state government took over its management in the 1980s, and now it is back to boarding school after it was returned to the Anglican Mission. The curriculum is in compliance with the 3-3 format of secondary school education in Nigeria, which is 3 years of Junior Secondary School (JSS) leading to the enrollment for the Junior School Certificate Examination (JSCE) and 3 years of Senior Secondary School (SSS) leading to the enrollment for the Senior School Certificate Examination (SSCE).

== Eghosa School Anthem ==
Eghosa Anglican Grammar School has its own unique School Anthem, here reproduced below:

"We are the students of Eghosa Grammar School, God bless us all.

"In all our endeavours, we hope to do our best. Grant this, O Lord, we pray, in Jesus' name.

"In unity and strength Which is our own motto We are steadfast, to always do the right, anytime, any day Grant this, O Lord, we pray in Jesus' name."

The above School Anthem of Eghosa Anglican Grammar School was produced and adopted in 1970. The School Anthem was authored by an old boy of the school who graduated in 1970, Dr. Godwill Aghatise Ogboghodo, who later became a commissioner of Education in the State.

== Notable alumni ==
- Gov. Godwin Obaseki
- Sen. Matthew Urhoghide,
- Dr. Godwill Aghatise Ogboghodo
- Dr. Osahon Ukponmwan,
- Dr. Jolly Osadiaye
- Prof. Eghosa Osaghae
- Dr. Toni Ogunbor
- Dr. Michael Etomi
- Chief George Etomi
- Prof. Anthony Okorodudu
- Prof. Chris Imafidon
- HRH Ehizogie Eluojierior/Onojie of Igueben
- Dr. Osagie Igbinosun
- Chief Victor Ogiemwonyi
- Barr. Ogie Osarodion
- Amb. Lancelot Oduwa Imasuen
- Chief Charles Uwensuyi Edosomwan
- Bishop Dr. Charles Agbe Davies
- Archbishop Dr. Osama Usuanlele
- Prof. Ehigie Alile-Egbon
- Col.(rtd) Paul Ihianle
- Esv. Bernard Eboreime
- Chief Edwin Ogunbor
- Barrister Christian Omatsone
- Chief Edwin Edebiri
