= Edo Technical College =

Vocational school in Nigeria

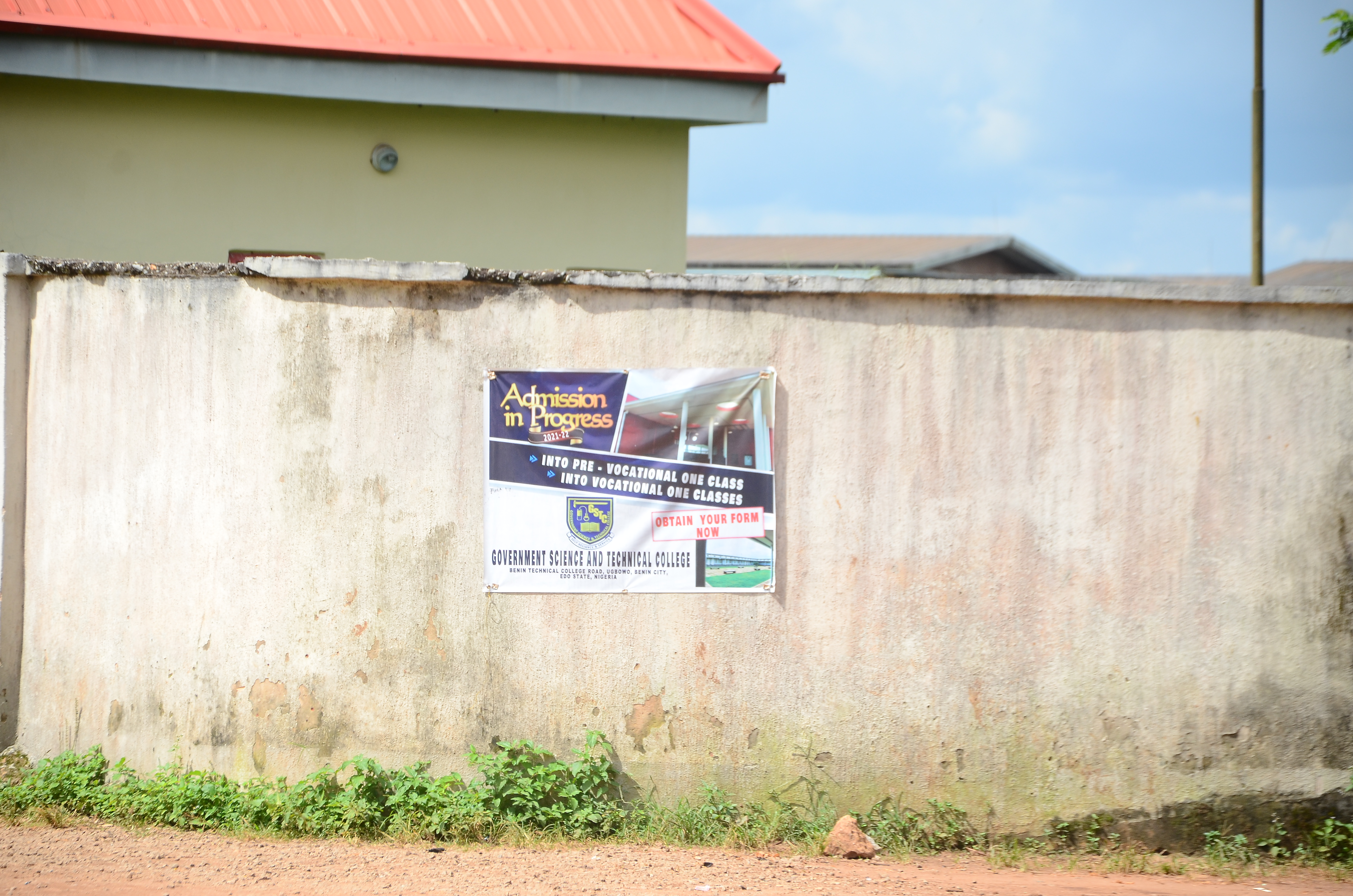
Edo Technical College Fence

Edo Technical College, sometimes referred to as Benin Technical College is a technical and vocational institution located in Edo State, Nigeria. The institution was first established in Benin City in 1970 by the Canadian government during the administration of late Dr. Samuel Ogbemudia. The school provides vocational and technical skills to students in order to promote entrepreneurship among youths in Edo State. The Government Science and Technical College (GSTC) Benin City, Edo State now wears a new look, thanks to the World Bank assisted State Employment and Expenditure for Results (SEEFOR).

== Campus structure ==
Edo Technical College operates a multi-campus structure. The campuses are located in different local government areas of the State. The colleges include Government Science Technical College (GSTC), Benin (formerly Benin Technical College (BTC)); Igarra Technical College; Afuze Technical College and Uromi Technical College.
