= Modupe Ozolua =

Nigerian businesswoman

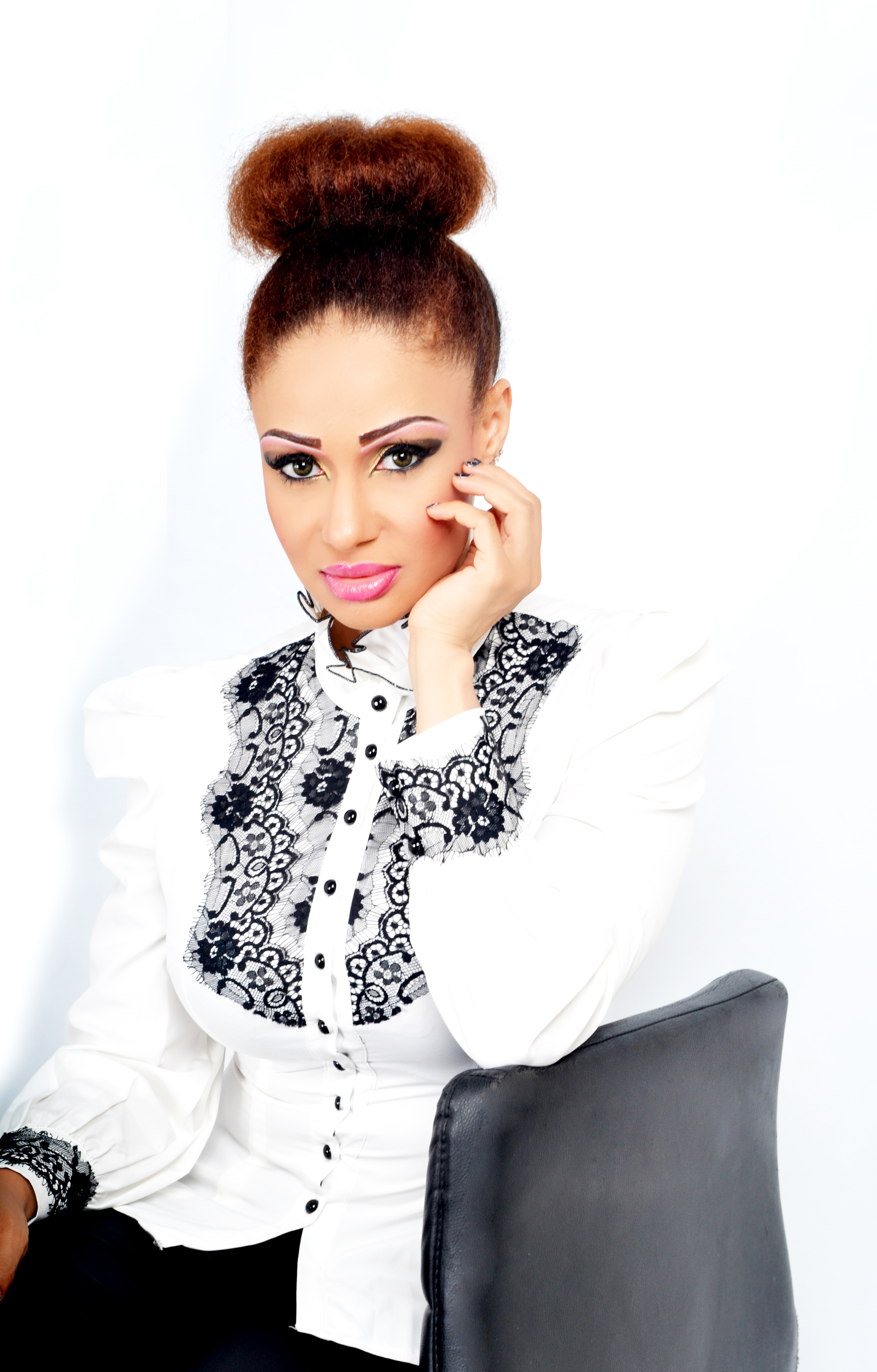
- Modupe Ozolua
- Born: 10 October 1973 (age 52); Benin City, Nigeria
- Education: Business management - Southwestern College
- Occupations: Entrepreneur; Philanthropist
- Known for: Pioneering cosmetic surgery in West Africa
- Notable work: She was the CEO of Body Enhancement Ltd
- Children: 1
- Awards: One of Africa’s 100 Most Inspiring Women in Nigeria (2022); The United States of America President's Lifetime Achievement Award for Philanthropy (2023)
- Website: Official site

Modupe Ozolua (born 10 October 1973) is a Lebanese-Nigerian-American philanthropist and entrepreneur. She was the CEO of Body Enhancement Ltd and is the founding president of Empower 54 Project Initiatives (Empower 54) formerly known as Body Enhancement Annual Reconstructive Surgery (BEARS) Foundation.

== Early life and education ==

Her name "Modupe" means "I give thanks" in Yoruba.

Ozolua studied business management in Southwestern College, graduated with honors, was inducted into the Alpha Pi Epsilon, chapter of Phi Theta Kappa and recognized as an outstanding student by the Southwestern Dean's Honorary List and the National Dean's List (1994 - 1995). Ozolua further studied at DeVry University where she obtained her Bachelor of Science in Technical Business Management and graduated with Magna Cum Laude honors.

== Career ==
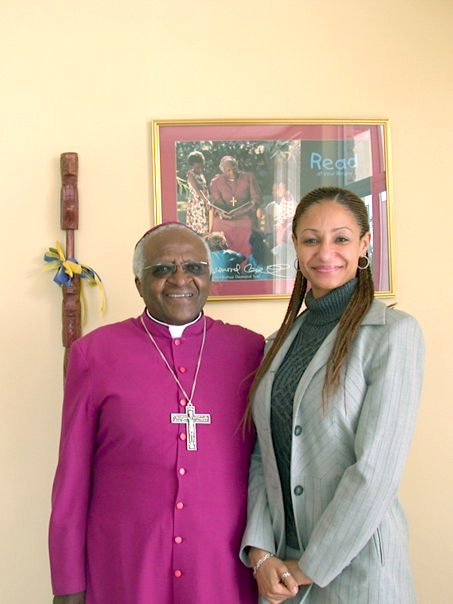

Ozolua returned to Nigeria in 2001 and started Body Enhancement Ltd, a cosmetic surgery company and aesthetic laser treatments in Nigeria.

In 2003, she founded Empower 54, formerly known as Body Enhancement Foundation, or Body Enhancement Annual Reconstructive Surgery (BEARS), an international humanitarian organization dedicated to providing humanitarian assistance such as medical missions, hunger eradication, education, female empowerment, and refugee programs to underprivileged Africans. Archbishop Desmond Tutu was a patron of Empower 54 since the creation of the organization in 2003.

All humanitarian aid rendered through Empower 54 is free to the beneficiaries. Empower 54's "Rise Above Terror" initiative has been active in rehabilitating women and children survivors of the Boko Haram terrorist group in Nigeria, through self-employment and education for the children at the IDP camps. Ozolua leads Empower 54 to enter communities attacked by Boko Haram in remote parts of North-East Nigeria and help survivors of insurgency attacks.

During one of the foundation's missions, she discovered the extremely malnourished children rescued from Boko Haram's captivity and facilitated the collaboration between Empower 54 and the Borno State Government in evacuating them to Maiduguri for urgent CMAM treatment. 1,500 children were evacuated from Bama, along with their families.

Ozolua writes articles focused on politics, charity and lifestyle which are published in Nigerian national newspapers and magazines.

== Personal life ==
Ozolua married at 21 and divorced at the age of 23. She has a son.

She holds the traditional title The Oyimizé of Ososo Kingdom, meaning "The One We Choose" from her mother's tribe. Her official website is www.modupeozolua.com.

== Some awards ==
- The United States of America President's Lifetime Achievement Award for Philanthropy. The award certificate was personally signed by President Joe Biden (2023)
- The Office of the President of the United States of America Letter of Commendation for Philanthropy. The letter was personally signed by President Joe Biden and came with a pin (2023)
- "Princess Modupe Ozolua's Day" official proclamation from the City of Houston, Texas USA (2019). In recognition of Ozolua’s humanitarian contributions, Mayor Sylvester Turner issued an official proclamation declaring 10 October 2019 as Princess Modupé Ozolua Day in Houston, Texas, USA.
- City of Atlanta, Georgia (USA) official proclamation for service to humanity was issued to Ozolua and Empower 54 by the City Council of the City of Atlanta, Georgia, USA in 2006
- Letter of commendation by the City of Houston, Texas. In 2019, Mayor Sylvester Turner issued a letter commending Ozolua’s humanitarian activities.
- Letter of commendation by Governor Nathan Deal of the State of Georgia (USA) was issued recognizing Ozolua’s contribution to humanity in 2016
- "One Of 50 African Women Who Shape The African Continent" recognition of Ozolua’s impact across Africa was made by Elle South Africa in 2016. The Elle Magazine campaign was titled "The Incredibles" #TheIncredibles
- "One Of Africa’s Leading Female Entrepreneurs" recognition by Elle South Africa in 2015 acknowledged Ozolua’s leadership and entrepreneurship footprints in the African marketplace
- "One of the Leading Ladies Of Africa (Nigeria)" 2022
- "One of Africa’s 100 Most Inspiring Women in Nigeria" (2022)
- Award of Excellence Obafemi Awolowo University, Moremi Hall Executive Council, Ile-ife
- Beautician of the Year : 5th City People Award for Excellence
- Excellence in Enterprise Award : Dr Kwame Nkrumah International Award, Ghana
- Female Achiever of the Year, (2001) : City People Award, Nigeria
- Humanitarian Service Award : Rotaract Club of Nigeria (Rotary International)
- Merit Award : Lagos State Aids Control Agency Governor's Office (LSACA), Outstanding Nigerian Woman, Nigerian Women's Award, 5th Annual Ceremony
- SheRose Awards (2018) : SheRose, Ireland

== Some nominations ==
- Honorary Consul, Democratic Republic of Congo (DRC). President Felix Tsehisekedi nominated Ozolua as the DRC's Honorary Consul to Lagos, Nigeria (2020)
- Young Manager of the Year, ThisDay Newspaper Awards, Nigeria (2005)

== Some projects ==
- Bi-Annual distribution of albendazole, deworming medication and pre-natal vitamins to over 620,000 children and women in Nigeria and DRC during each mission (since 2018)
- Distribution of albendazole, deworming medication and pre-natal vitamins to over 10,000 children and women in Edo State, Nigeria (2018)
- Collaboration with the Nigerian Army and the Borno State government, initiated, facilitated and led the evacuation of 1,800 severely malnourished IDP children from Boko Haram’s stronghold in Bama, Borno State (2016)
- Niger Delta and Kano State: Bringing hope to Nigerian children suffering from birth defects (2003)
- Edo State, Nigeria: Reconstructive surgery of victims of contaminated kerosene explosions (2004)
- Niger Delta, Nigeria: Reconstructive surgery for underprivileged children (2004)
- Niger Delta, Nigeria: Reconstructive surgery for underprivileged children (2005)
- Kwara State, Nigeria: Free national medical mission (2006)
- Tabora, Tanzania: Medical mission (2007)
- Free medical missions in Ethiopia, Mali, Niger Republic and Zambia (since 2010)
- Adamawa State: Establishment of school at IDP camp (February 2015)
- Gombe State: Rehabilitation of internally displaced persons (IDPs) in Gombe State, North East Nigeria (February 2015)
- Adamawa and Borno States: E54's RISE caps pilot scheme (April 2015)
- Adamawa, Gombe and Borno States: Inspection of communities destroyed by Boko Haram (May/June 2015)
- Government Junior Secondary School (GJSS) renovation of schools destroyed by Boko Haram in Uba, Adamawa State (July 2015)
- Malkoi Camp and NYSC Camp, Adamawa State, Nigeria (September 2015)
- Rise Above Terror..What Happens Next? Abuja, Nigeria (9 October 2015)
- Empower 54 Annual African Art Gala, Atlanta, Georgia (30 April 2016)
- Building of classrooms for IDP children, Bakasi IDP camp, Maiduguri (June 2016)
- Donation of 40-foot containers of medication and nutritional meals to IDPs, Borno State, Nigeria (January 2017)
- Establishment of small-scale Ready-To-Use-Therapeutic-Food (RUTF) production facility in Abuja, Nigeria (March 2017)
- Donation of paint and computers to schools in Mai-Ndombe Province, Democratic Republic of the Congo (May 2017)
- Provision of vitamin A and albendazole medication for 620,000 children in Mai-Ndombe Province (September 2017)
- Provision of vitamin A and albendazole medication for 5 million children in the oil-producing states of the Niger Delta, Nigeria (February 2018)
