= Wellspring University =

University in Benin City, Nigeria

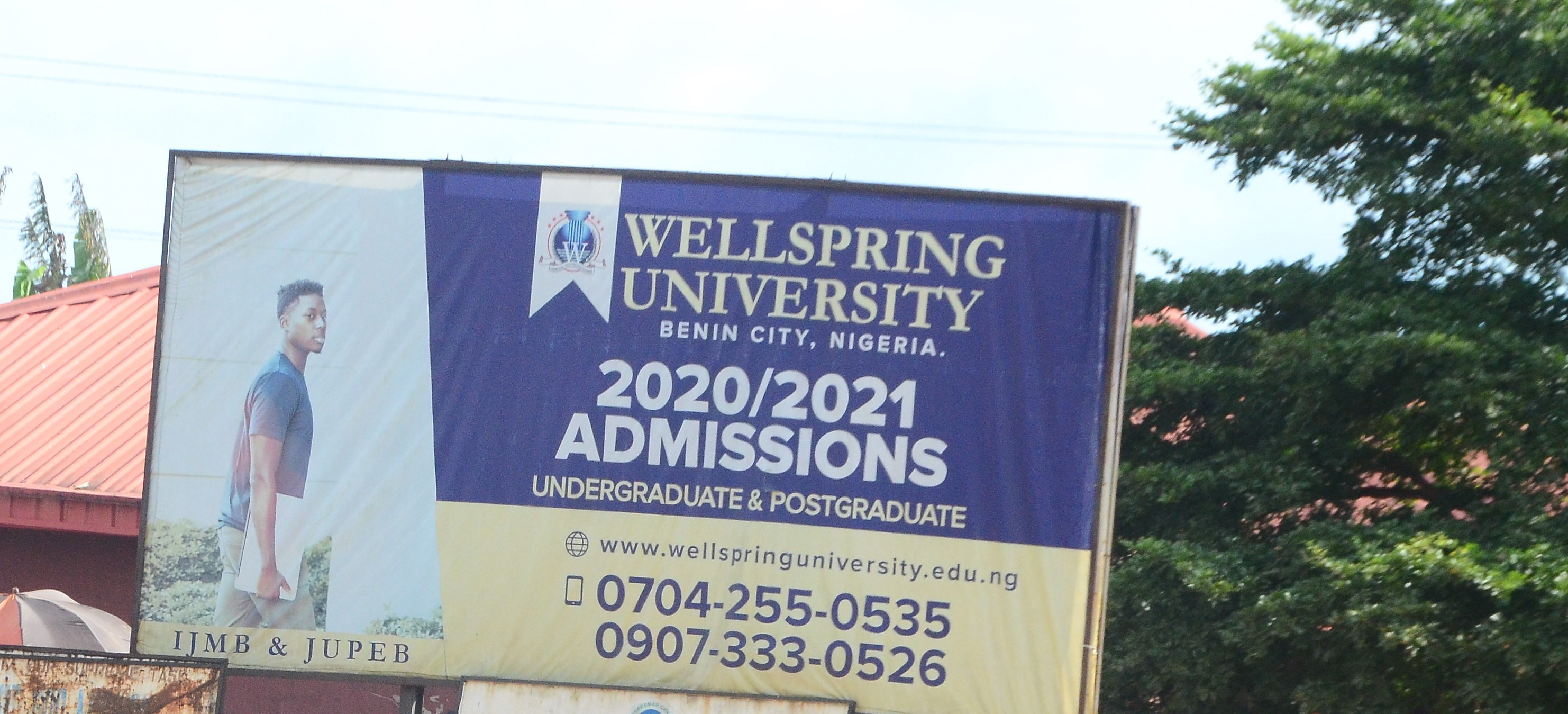
- Type: Private University
- Established: 2009
- Chancellor: Ituah Ighodalo
- Vice-Chancellor: Isaac Rotimi Ajayi
- Location: Irhirhi road, off ADP junction by Airport road, Benin City, Edo State, Nigeria; 6.2810°N 5.5855°E
- Colors: Navy blue and crimson
- Website: www.wellspringuni.edu.ng

Wellspring University is a private university, licensed by the Federal Government of Nigeria in November 2009. It is located in Benin City, Edo state, Nigeria. The university was founded by the Management Science Centre, a Professional Training and Educational Consulting Firm established in 1983. The University was established on Christian beliefs and principles. The university currently runs its undergraduate programmes in its four colleges and its postgraduate programmes in its postgraduate school. All the academic programmes of the university are accredited by the National Universities Commission, and the university was rated third among the second-generation private universities in 2019 according to NUC Webometric Ranking, 2019.

== History ==
In 1983, a group of academics and professionals came together in Lagos to establish Management Science Centre. The Centre commenced operations on a modest scale with the private coaching of students at the University of Lagos Correspondence and Open Studies Institute (COSIT), later renamed Distance Learning Institute. By 1995, the modest foundation of 1983 had brought Management Science Centre into joint relationships with reputable institutions of higher learning in Nigeria, including: a) Auchi Polytechnic, Auchi, Edo State, for Certificate courses; b) University of Ibadan, Oyo State, for Diploma courses; c) Ambrose Alli University, Edo State, for undergraduate and postgraduate degree courses.

The achievements in the above programmes gave rise to a desire to expand into other tiers of education in the country. The result was the establishment of:

- Wisdom Gate High School which was established in 2001 and
- Wellspring College which was established in 2003

== Convocation ==
The University had its first combined convocation ceremony on 22–25 March 2017, with Amb. Daniel C. Isimoya as pro-chancellor, Prof. F.E Obi Ikediugwu as Vice Chancellor and Barr (Mrs.) Edith Emmamezi Efam as Registrar. The Chancellor, Pastor Ituah Ighodalo, was conferred with a Doctor of Letters degree at the University. The then Governor of Lagos State, His Excellency, Mr. Akinwumi Ambode delivered the convocation lecture and four eminent Nigerians namely: Dr. Uyi Akpata, Chief (Dr.) Innocent Ifediaso Chukwuma, Dr. Ambriosie Bryant Chukwueloka and Dr. Dorry Afe Okojie were honoured with the doctorate degrees of the University. The second combined convocation took place in June, 2021 where three distinguished Nigerians namely: Major-General (Dr.) Umaru Mallam Mohammed, Major-General (Dr.) Charles Ehigie Airhiavbere and Dr. Oluwagbemiga Oyebode received the honorary doctorate degrees of the University.

== Academic programmes ==
The University has four colleges and runs the courses as indicated below in the colleges:

=== The College of Natural and Applied Sciences ===
- Microbiology
- Biochemistry

=== The College of Computing ===
- Computer science
- Information technology
- Cyber security
- Software engineering

=== The College of Health Sciences ===
- Nursing sciences
- Medical laboratory science

=== The College of Social and Management Science ===
- Accounting
- Taxation
- Mass communication
- Business administration
- Hotel management
- Entrepreneurship
- Economics
- International relations
- Public administration

== Student life ==
The student affairs division of the University also facilitates the spiritual and godly training of the students.

== See also ==
- Academic libraries in Nigeria
