= Presentation National High School =

Is a girl boarding school in Benin city Nigeria

Location
- 95 Usunobun St, Avbiama, Benin City 300104, Edo; Benin City, Edo State; Nigeria
- Coordinates: 6.3053°N 5.6606°E

Information
- Type: Girls' School
- Established: November 21, 1989
- Founder: Archbishop Patrick Ebosele Ekpu
- Website: https://presentationnationalhighschool.com.ng/

Presentation National High School is an all-girls boarding school in Usunobun Street, Ugbekun Quarters, Benin City, Edo State Nigeria. This boarding school was founded by the Archbishop of Benin City, Archbishop Patrick Ebosele Ekpu, on November 21, 1989.

Presentation national high school is the best girls school (NTA), May 2, 2016.

The school aims to create an atmosphere supportive of learning and sharing irrespective of race or ethnicity. The school's motto is: "Potestas Ex Scientia" (Knowledge is power). It achieved 11th position in the 2006 West African Senior Secondary Certificate Exams.

== History ==
Presentation National High School was established on November 21, 1989, with an initial intake of 60 students.

== Curriculum ==
The school offers a wide range of subjects, including sciences, arts, and social sciences. Students are encouraged to participate in extracurricular activities, such as sports, music, and drama. The school also offers vocational training in areas such as catering, fashion design, and computer science.
