= Benin City =

Capital city of Edo State, Nigeria

- City
- Benin
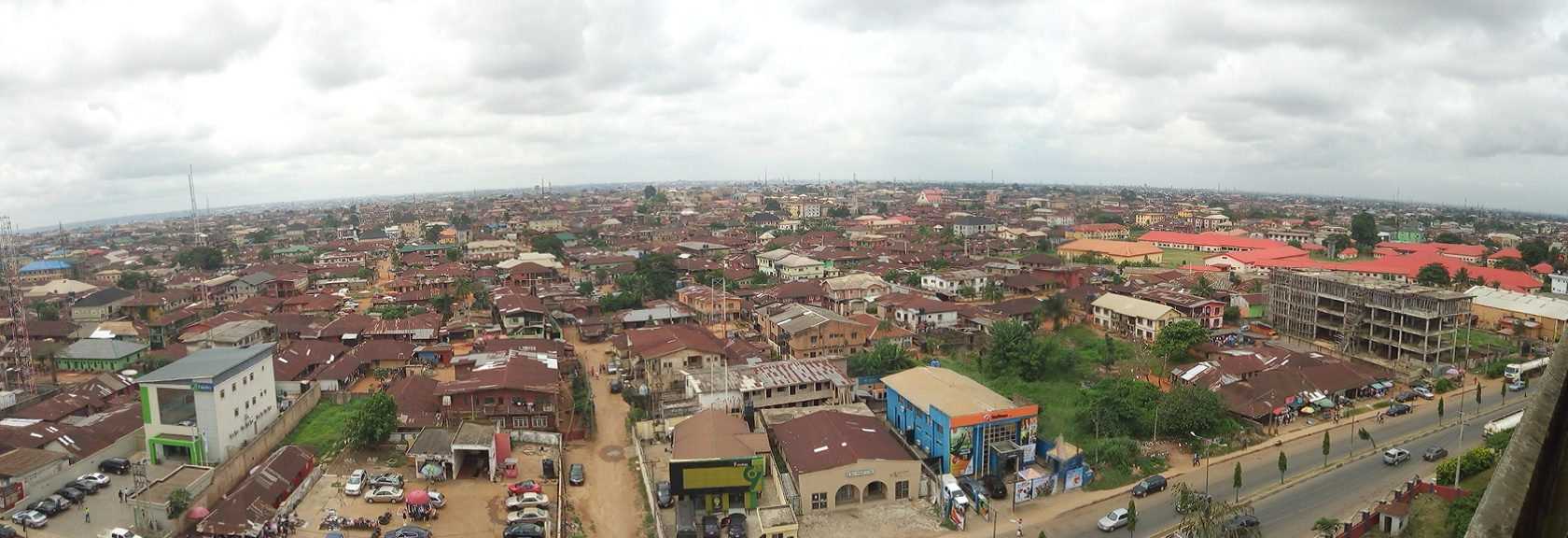
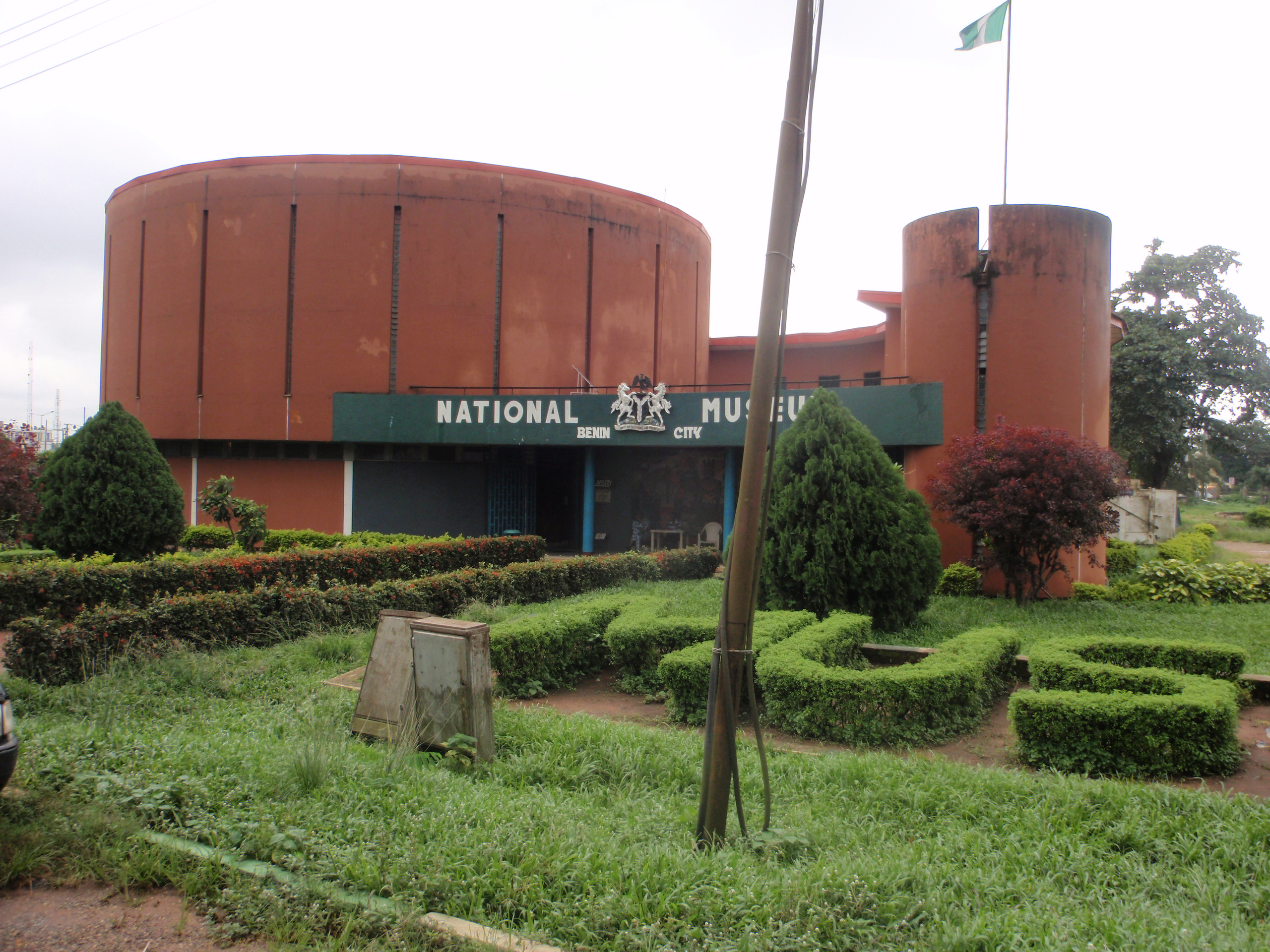
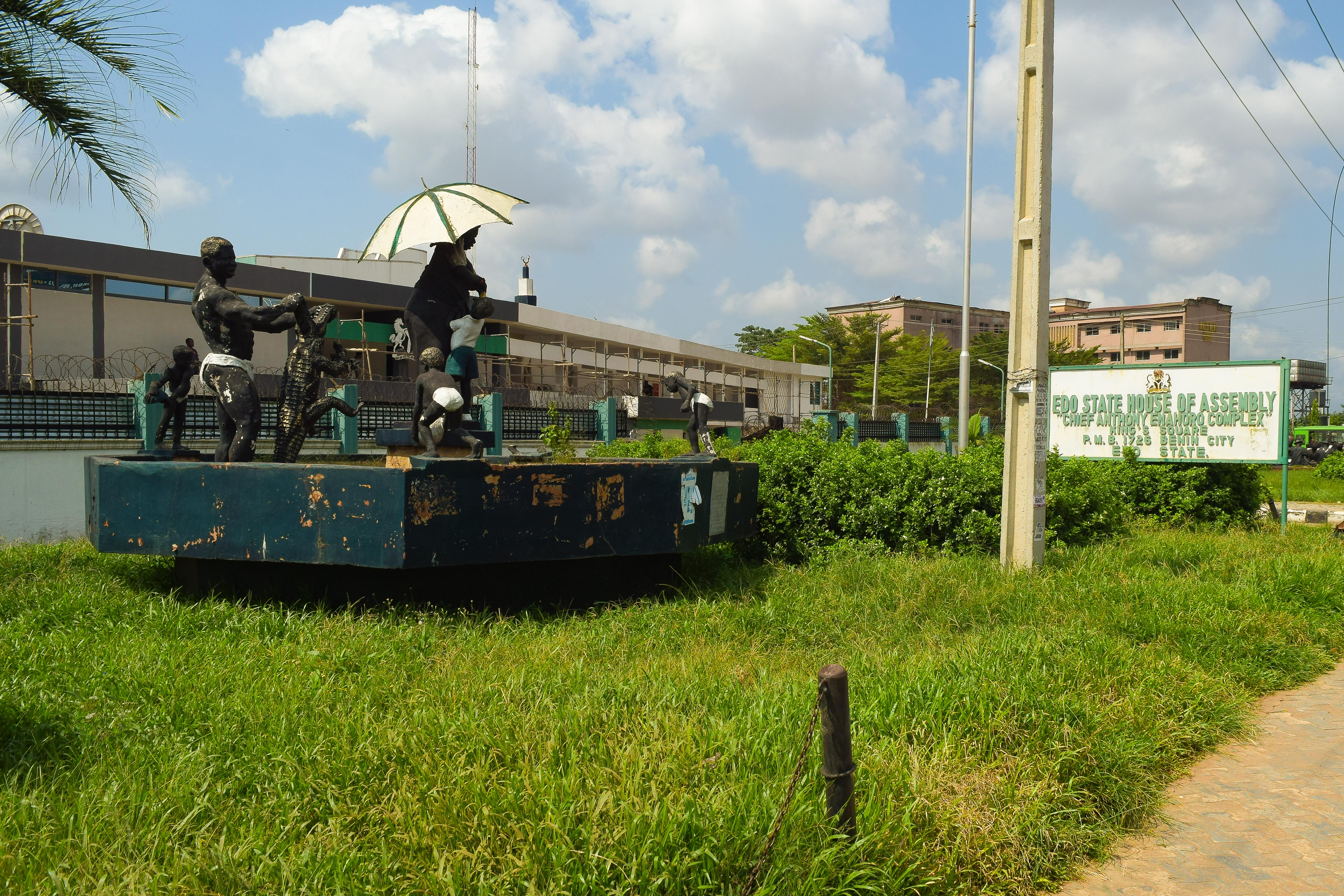
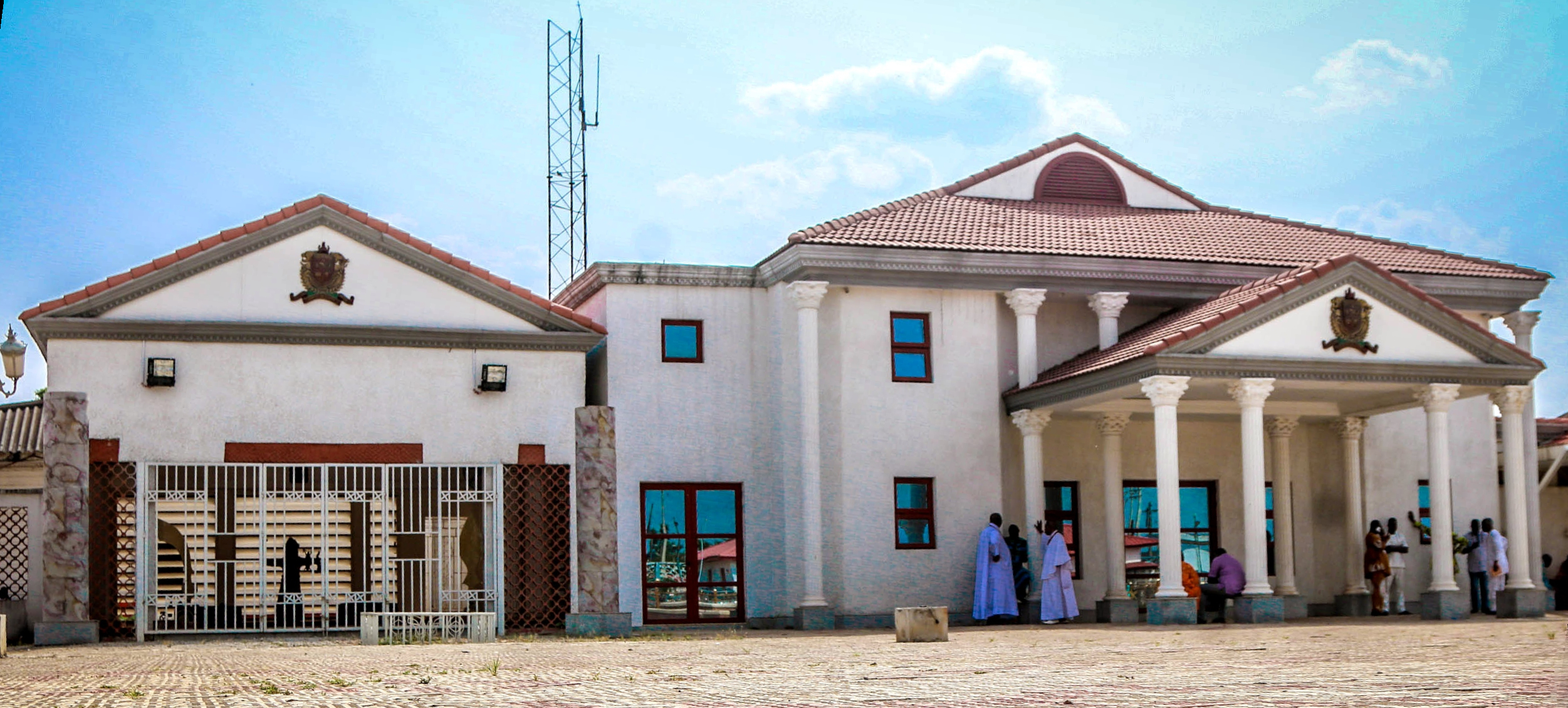
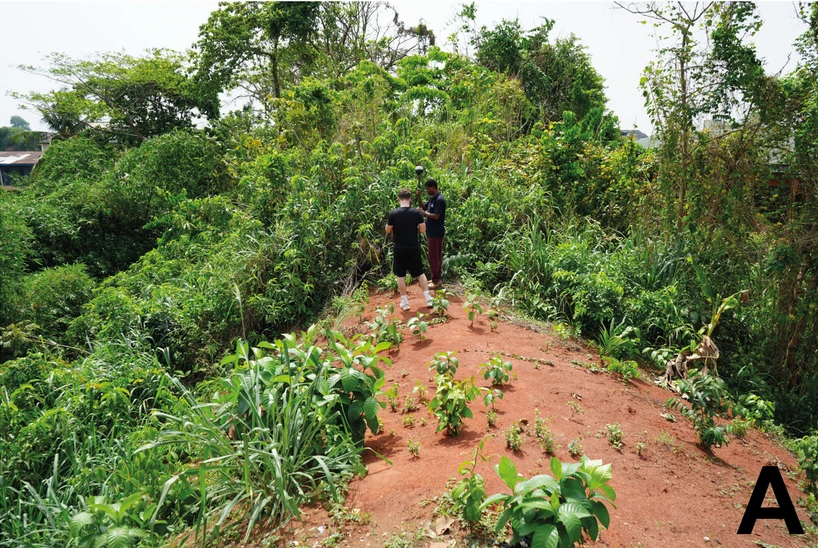
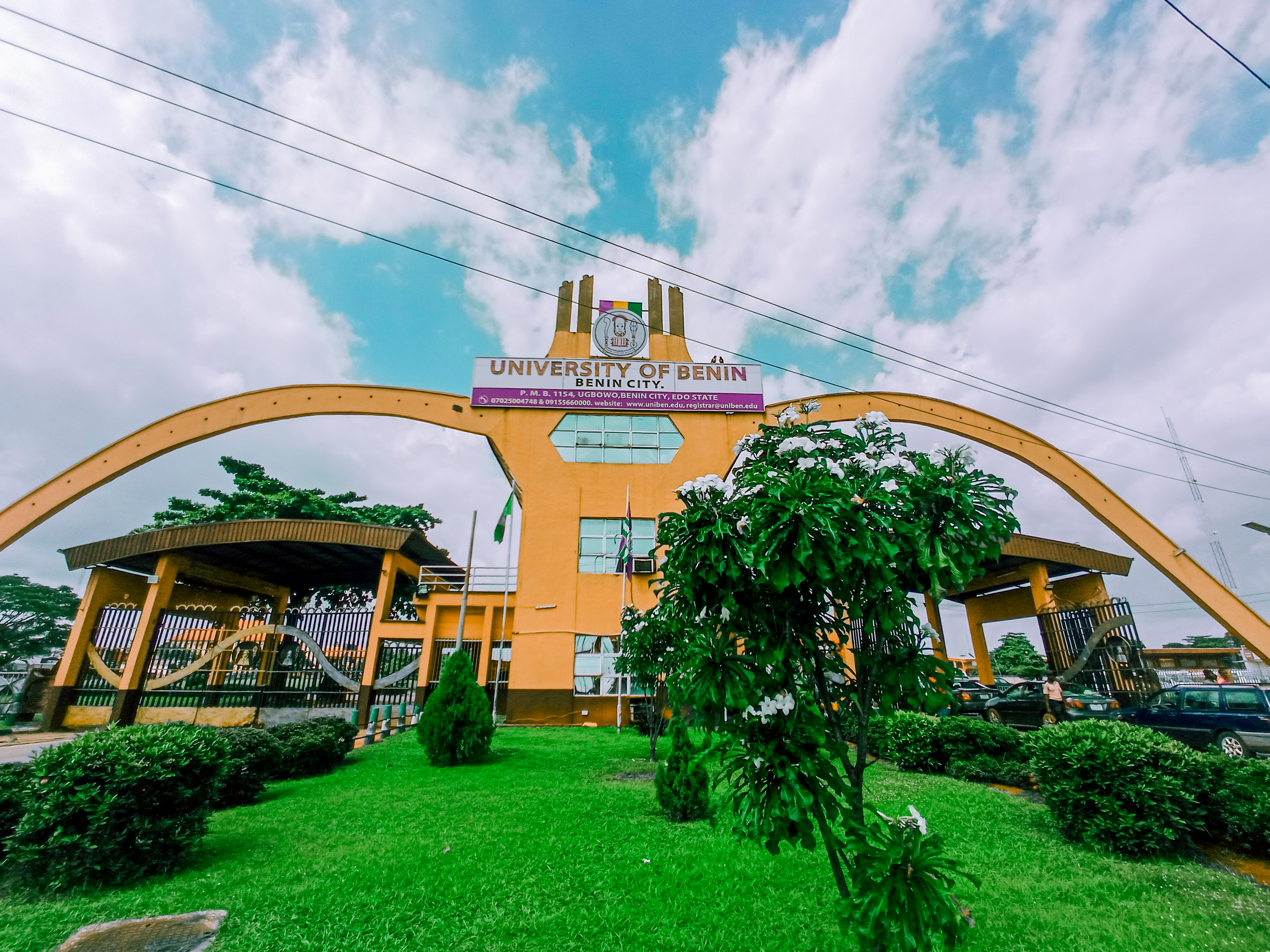
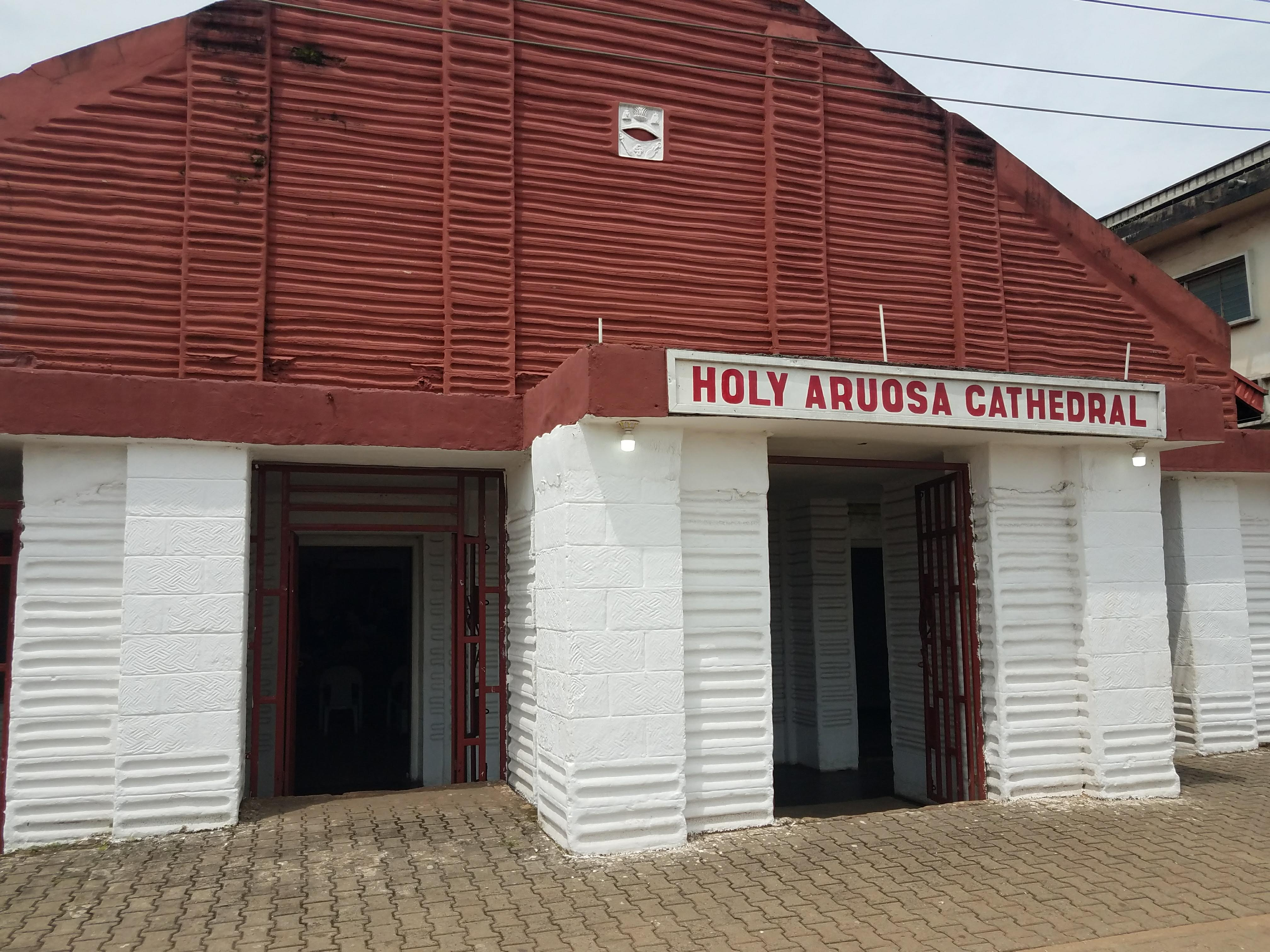
- Panorama of the City (2018) National Museum Edo State House of Assembly Palace of the Oba of Benin Benin Moat University of Benin Main Gate Holy Aruosa Cathedral

- Location in Nigeria
- Coordinates: 6°20′00″N 5°37′20″E
- Country: Nigeria
- State: Edo
- LGAs: Egor; Ikpoba-Okha; Oredo

Area
  - City: 1,204 km^{2} (465 sq mi)

Population
  - Estimate (2026): 1,770,251
  - Rank: 4th in Nigeria; 8th (Agglomeration); 6th (Metro)
  - Urban: 1,845,822
  - Metro: 2,120,000

GDP (PPP, 2015 int. Dollar)
  - Year: 2023
  - Total: $16.6 billion
  - Per capita: $8,700
- Climate: Aw

Benin City is the capital and largest city of Edo State, southern Nigeria. It is the fourth-largest city in Nigeria according to the 2006 census, after Lagos, Kano, and Ibadan. Benin City comprises three local government areas; Egor, Ikpoba-Okha and Oredo with some parts extending into the Ovia North-East and Uhunmwonde LGAs.

== History ==
=== European contact and colonization ===
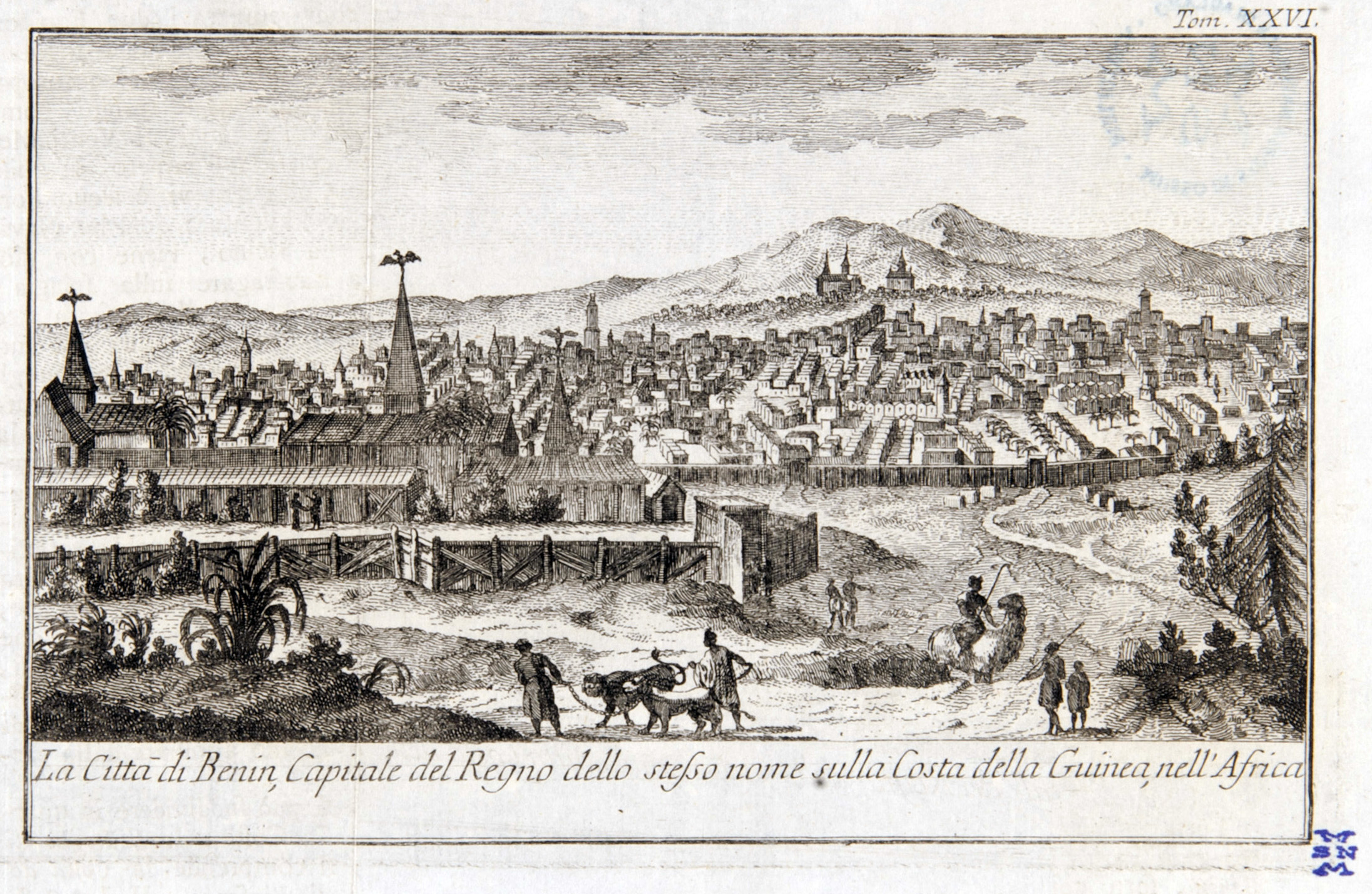
18th century depiction of Benin city

The Portuguese visited Benin City around 1485. Benin grew rich during the 16th and 17th centuries due to trade within southern Nigeria, as well as through trade with Europeans, mostly in pepper and ivory. In the early 16th century, the Ọba sent an ambassador to Lisbon, and the King of Portugal sent Christian missionaries to Benin. Some residents of Benin could still speak a pidgin Portuguese in the late 19th century. Many Portuguese loan words can still be found today in the languages of the area. A Portuguese captain (Lourenco Pinto) described the city in 1691: "Great Benin, where the king resides, is larger than Lisbon; all the streets run straight and as far as the eye can see. The houses are large, especially that of the king, which is richly decorated and has fine columns. The city is wealthy and industrious. It is so well governed that theft is unknown and the people live in such security that they have no doors to their houses".

Whilst 16th and 17th century European accounts of Benin City compared its scale to European cities, in a 1701 or 1702 letter the Dutch East India Company merchant David van Nyendael described Benin City as a “mere village”. Although he praised the king’s palace with its turreted roofs decorated with brass snakes, and described the city’s intact houses as “large and handsome,” he noted that the town had clearly been more densely populated in the past and was now mostly “half-ruined houses.”

In 1820 a British Naval officer, Lieutenant John King, visited Benin city and wrote, "The walls having been to a large extent destroyed and the city having been formerly depopulated by a civil war, the circumference of the inhabited area does not now exceed two or three miles." In 1897 Reginald Bacon, a member of the British Punitive Expedition, described Benin city as "an irregular straggling town formed by groups of houses separated from each other by patches of bush. It is perhaps a mile and a half long from east to west, and a mile from north to south." The town was located about a mile beyond the large surrounding rampart and ditch encountered by the Expedition (the Benin city wall or moat), suggesting that it had shrunk in size from its earlier peak.

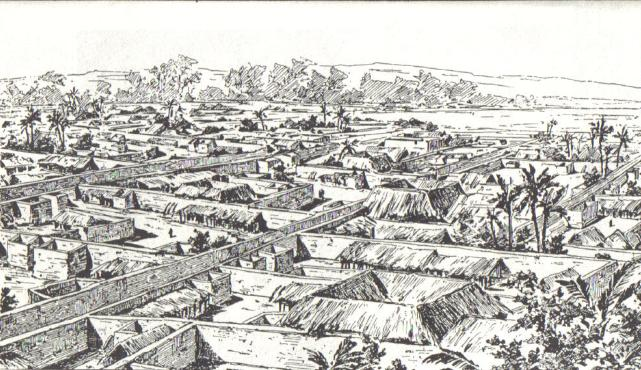
Drawing of Benin City made by a British officer, 1897

On 17 February 1897, Benin City fell to the British. In the "Punitive Expedition", a 1,200-strong British force, under the command of Admiral Sir Harry Rawson, captured, sacked, and burnt the city after all but two men from a previous British delegation led by Acting Consul General James Robert Phillips were ambushed and killed. Alan Boisragon, one of the survivors of the Benin Massacre, included references of the practice of human sacrifice in the city in a firsthand account written in 1898 (one year after the Punitive Expedition). Historian James D. Graham notes that although "there is little doubt that human sacrifices were an integral part of the Benin state religion from very early days," first-hand accounts regarding such acts often varied significantly, with some reporting them and others making no mention of them.

The capture of Benin paved the way for British colonization and the merging of later regional British incorporation of African kingdoms into the Niger Coast Protectorate, the Protectorate of Southern Nigeria and finally, into the Colony and Protectorate of Nigeria. The British permitted the restoration of the Benin monarchy in 1914, but true political power still lay with the colonial administration of Nigeria.

=== Nigerian independence ===
Following Nigeria's independence from British rule in 1960, Benin City became the capital of Mid-Western Region when the region was split from Western Region in June 1963. In 1976, when the region was renamed Bendel State, it remained the capital of the region. it became the State Capital of Edo State when the state of Bendel was divided into the Delta State and Edo State in 1991.

== Edo people ==
The indigenous people of Benin City are the Edo people (the Benin People), and they speak the Edo language or Bini Language. The people of the city have one of the richest dress cultures on the African continent and are renowned for their beads (the beads stand for royalty and usually stand out during the traditional marriage of the Benin people), body marks, bangles, anklets, raffia work. They are also known for subsistence farming of yam, plantain and cassava.

According to tradition, the original people and founders of the Ẹdo Empire and the Edo people, were ruled by the kings known as the Ogiso (meaning King of the sky) dynasty who called the land Igodomigodo. Igodo, the first Ogiso, wielded much influence and gained popularity as a good ruler. He died after a long reign and was succeeded by Ere, his eldest son. A battle for power soon erupted between the wife of the last Ogiso and prince Ekaladerhan, son of the last Ogiso. Prince Ekaladerhan was framed by his father's wife and sentenced to death. The men sent to kill him, however, released him at Ughoton. The exiled prince made his way to where he changed his name to Izoduwa, meaning "I have found prosperity". It was during this period of confusion in Benin that the elders, led by Chief Oliha, mounted a search for the banished Prince Ekaladerhan – whom the Ife people now called Oduduwa.

The exiled Oduduwa, refused to come to Benin because of how he was treated, having found out that he was not killed. He devised to send one of his sons, Oramiyan to become king in his place. Prince Ọranmiyan took up residence in the palace built for him at Uzama by the elders, now a coronation shrine. Soon after he married a beautiful lady, Ẹrinmwide, daughter of Osa-nego, the ninth Enogie of Egor. He and Erinmwide had a son. After some years he called a meeting of the people and renounced his office, remarking that the country was a land of vexation, Ile-Ibinu, and that only a child born, trained, and educated in the arts and mysteries of the land could reign over the people. The country was afterward known by this name. He caused his son born to him by Ẹrinmwide to be made King in his place and returned to Benin land. After some years in Ife, he left for Benin, where he also left a son behind upon leaving, and his son Ajaka ultimately became the first Oba of Benin of the present line, while Ọranmiyan himself was reigning as Ọọni of Ifẹ. Therefore, Ọranmiyan of Ife, the father of Ẹwẹka I, the Ọba of Benin, was also the father of Ajaka, Alaafin of Ọyọ. Ọba Ẹwẹka later changed the name of the city of Ile-Binu, the capital of the Benin kingdom, to "Ubinu." This name would be reinterpreted by the Portuguese as "Benin" in their own language. Around 1470, Ẹwuare changed the name of the state to Ẹdo. This was about the time the people of Ọkpẹkpẹ migrated from Benin City. Alternatively, the Yoruba nation has a different conception of Oduduwa. According to Yoruba tradition, because of his power and military might, he was able to defeat the enemies invading Benin and that is why the people of Benin made him the King or Ọba of Benin. In any case, it is agreed upon by both the Yoruba and the Edo that Oduduwa sent his son Prince Oranmiyan of Ife to rule Benin City and founded the Oba dynasty in Benin City.

Benin imperialism was started in the last decade of the thirteen century by Oba Ewedo.

== Geography and Climate ==
Benin City has a borderline tropical monsoon climate (Köppen Am) bordering upon a tropical savanna climate (Aw). The weather is hot and humid year-round, and generally very dull, especially between July and September.

Climate data for Benin City (1991–2020 normals, extremes 1951–1965, 1991–2020)
Month	Jan	Feb	Mar	Apr	May	Jun	Jul	Aug	Sep	Oct	Nov	Dec	Year
Record high °C (°F)	40 (104)	43 (109)	42 (108)	48 (118)	39.5 (103.1)	39.5 (103.1)	35 (95)	32.8 (91.0)	35 (95)	34.5 (94.1)	36 (97)	37.0 (98.6)	48.0 (118.4)
Mean daily maximum °C (°F)	33.6 (92.5)	34.9 (94.8)	34.4 (93.9)	33.4 (92.1)	32.4 (90.3)	30.7 (87.3)	29.0 (84.2)	28.6 (83.5)	29.7 (85.5)	31.1 (88.0)	32.9 (91.2)	33.4 (92.1)	32.0 (89.6)
Daily mean °C (°F)	28.8 (83.8)	29.5 (85.1)	29.2 (84.6)	28.7 (83.7)	28.2 (82.8)	27.4 (81.3)	26.5 (79.7)	26.3 (79.3)	26.8 (80.2)	27.5 (81.5)	28.4 (83.1)	28.7 (83.7)	28.0 (82.4)
Mean daily minimum °C (°F)	23.0 (73.4)	24.6 (76.3)	24.8 (76.6)	24.5 (76.1)	24.1 (75.4)	23.4 (74.1)	23.0 (73.4)	22.8 (73.0)	22.9 (73.2)	23.1 (73.6)	23.7 (74.7)	22.9 (73.2)	23.6 (74.5)
Record low °C (°F)	12.8 (55.0)	13.3 (55.9)	18.3 (64.9)	19.4 (66.9)	19.4 (66.9)	18.3 (64.9)	16.7 (62.1)	16.1 (61.0)	18.9 (66.0)	18.9 (66.0)	15.6 (60.1)	11.0 (51.8)	11.0 (51.8)
Average rainfall mm (inches)	19.4 (0.76)	55.7 (2.19)	126.2 (4.97)	192.5 (7.58)	238.9 (9.41)	300.6 (11.83)	336.5 (13.25)	304.1 (11.97)	352.4 (13.87)	266.5 (10.49)	100.5 (3.96)	24.2 (0.95)	2,317.5 (91.24)
Average rainy days (≥ 1.0 mm)	1.2	3.7	7.7	10.5	12.2	15.6	18.7	17.7	18.2	16.3	7.0	2.2	131.0
Average relative humidity (%)	75.0	80.4	86.9	89.8	90.9	91.7	91.4	90.6	91.6	91.1	86.5	77.9	87.0
Mean monthly sunshine hours	179.8	178.0	173.6	177.0	176.7	144.0	99.2	89.9	81.0	148.8	192.0	213.9	1,853.9
Mean daily sunshine hours	5.8	6.3	5.6	5.9	5.7	4.8	3.2	2.9	2.7	4.8	6.4	6.9	5.1
Source 1: NOAA
Source 2: Deutscher Wetterdienst (sun 1951–1965)

== Economy ==
Benin City is one of the principal commercial and industrial centres in southern Nigeria. The city is the centre of Nigeria's rubber industry and has several rubber-processing plants as well as a crepe rubber factory. The Rubber Research Institute of Nigeria is located nearby at Iyanomo.

Agriculture is also an important part of the local economy. Palm oil and palm kernels are significant exports, and the Nigerian Institute for Oil Palm Research is based in Benin City. Other industries include furniture manufacturing, sawmilling, brewing, and soft-drink production.

== Education ==
Benin City is home to some of Nigeria's institutions of higher learning, namely, the University of Benin located at Ugbowo and Ekenwan, College of Education Ekiadolor, Benson Idahosa University, and Wellspring University.

Secondary schools in Benin include Edo College, Edo Boys High School (Adolo College), Western Boys High School, Oba Ewuare Grammar School, Greater Tomorrow Secondary School, Imaguero College, Garrick Memorial Secondary School, Winrose Secondary School, Asoro Grammar School, Eghosa Anglican Grammar School, Covenant Christian Academy, Niger College, Presentation National High School, Gaius Obaseki International High School, Immaculate Conception College (ICC), Uselu Secondary School, Idia College, University of Benin Demonstration Secondary School (UDSS), University Preparatory Secondary School, Auntie Maria School, Benin Technical College, Word of Faith Group of Schools, Lydia Group of Schools, Nosakhare Model Education Centre, Igbinedion Educational Center, Federal Government Girls College, Benin City.

== Environmental issues ==
=== Climate change ===
Scientists have already demonstrated the effects of climate change, with increases in temperature, humidity and precipitation trends between 1981 and 2015.

==== Flood management ====
Benin city experiences regular flooding. Studies have consistently highlighted the problem since at least 1993. Experts have recommended a number of ways to improve flood management, including better controls on land use, construction and development, improved Community-based programs designed to improve city adaptation and disaster management, and improvements in individual preparedness.

In June 2020, a significant number of communities and individuals were left homeless because of city flooding. At the time, residents and the city blamed poor storm drains and a failure to continue flood adaptation programs.

==== Urban heating ====
The city, on average is .5 degrees Celsius warmer than the surrounding rural areas, and these temperature differences are greater during the working weeks.

==== Waste management ====
A 2021 study published in Nature, highlighted that the city has not met the standards for waste management set by the Edo State Waste Management Board. After surveying 2720 inhabitants of the city, the authors found that most people in the city did not understand proper waste management practices. Moreover, the study found that survey participants did not understand how waste management was connected to other issues like greenhouse gas emissions. An additional study found that most residents did not understand the health impacts of bad waste management.

== Culture ==
Attractions in the city include the National Museum, the Oba Palace, Igun Street (famous for bronze casting and other metal works). Other attractions include various festivals and the Benin Moats (measuring about 20 to 40 ft), the King's Square (known as Ring Road) and the city's traditional markets.

The Binis are known for bronze sculpture, their casting skills, and their arts and craft. Benin City is also the home of one of the oldest ongoing monarchies in the world. Various festivals are held in Benin City yearly to celebrate various historic occasions and seasons.

=== Art ===
The "Benin Bronzes", portrait figures, busts and groups created in iron, carved ivory, and especially in brass (conventionally called "bronze"), were looted from the Benin City palace by the expeditionary force. Some of the bronzes were auctioned off to compensate for the expenses incurred during the capture and occupation of the city. Most of these artifacts can be found today in western museums at locations around the world. In recent years, appeals have gone to various museums and governments to return such artifacts. The most prominent of these artifacts was the famous Queen Idia mask used as a mascot during the Second Festival of Arts Culture (FESTAC '77) held in Nigeria in 1977 now known as "Festac Mask".

=== Festivals ===
Benin City has a popular festival called the Igue festival. The festival is an annual event held in the city to usher in the new year. The festival is an integral part of the culture of the people in Benin City (formerly referred to as Benin Kingdom or the Kingdom of Benin). The festival is believed to renew Oba Ewuare's magical powers, and it comes between the Christmas and New Year celebrations. The festival includes the Oba's blessing of the land and his people.

Aside the cultural festival, the city also plays host to the Benin City Film Festival. The festival creates room for the promotion of works produced by the local film community. It also promotes content of emerging national and international filmmakers, showcasing their works in an environment where they have access to experienced industry professionals.

==== Tradition ====
- Vadoo day: It occurs on 10th January every year and it is viewed by the people of Benin.
- Quintessence Film Festival
- Gelede Festival
- Waba Festival
- International Festival of the Dahomean Culture.

=== Bini market days ===
The "Bini" people have four market days: Ekioba, Ekenaka, Agbado, and Eken.

== Transportation ==
Benin Airport serves the city with domestic flights to other parts of Nigeria. Airlines operating from the airport include Green Africa Airways, United Nigeria Airlines, Aero Contractors, Arik Air, and Air Peace.

== Gallery ==
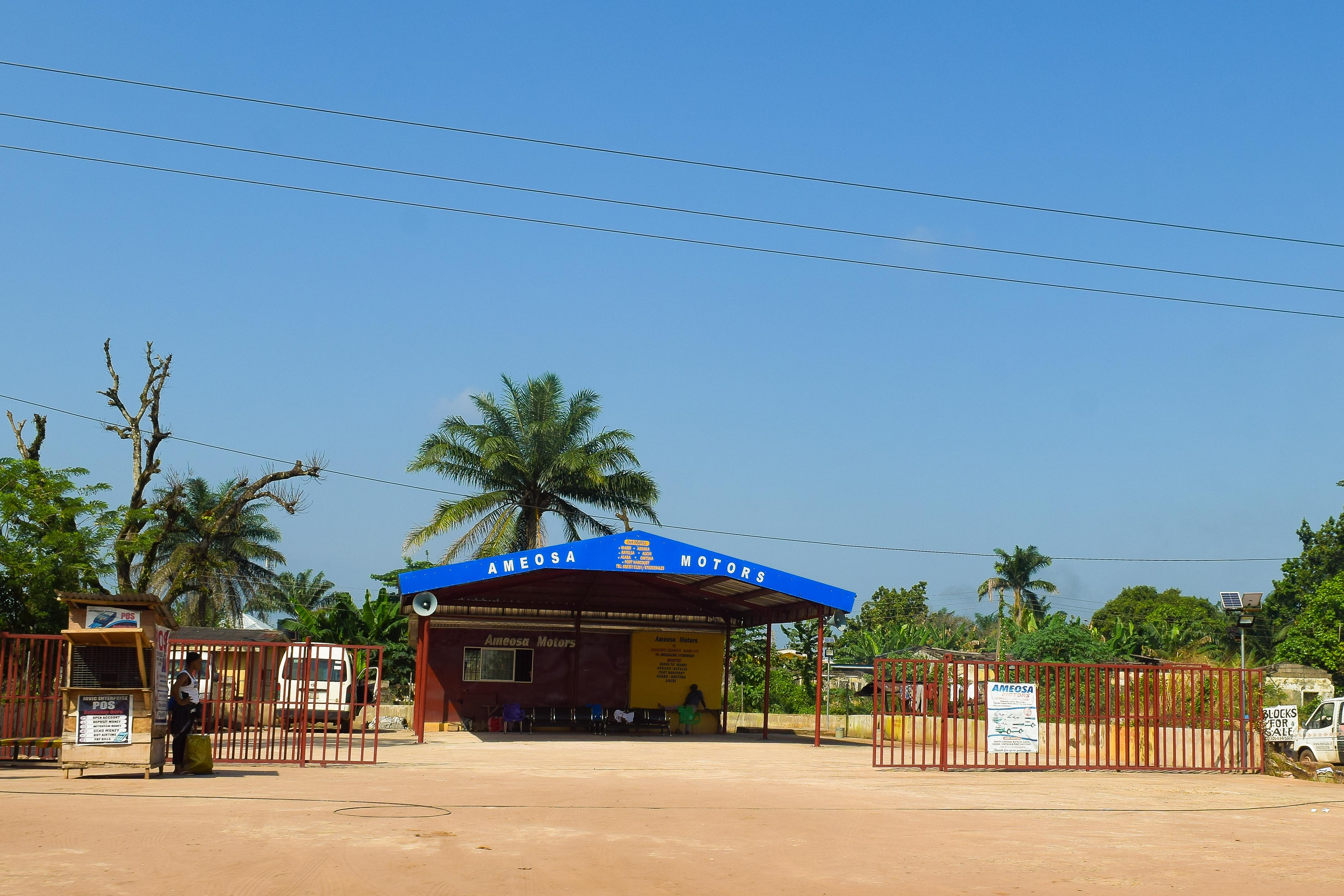

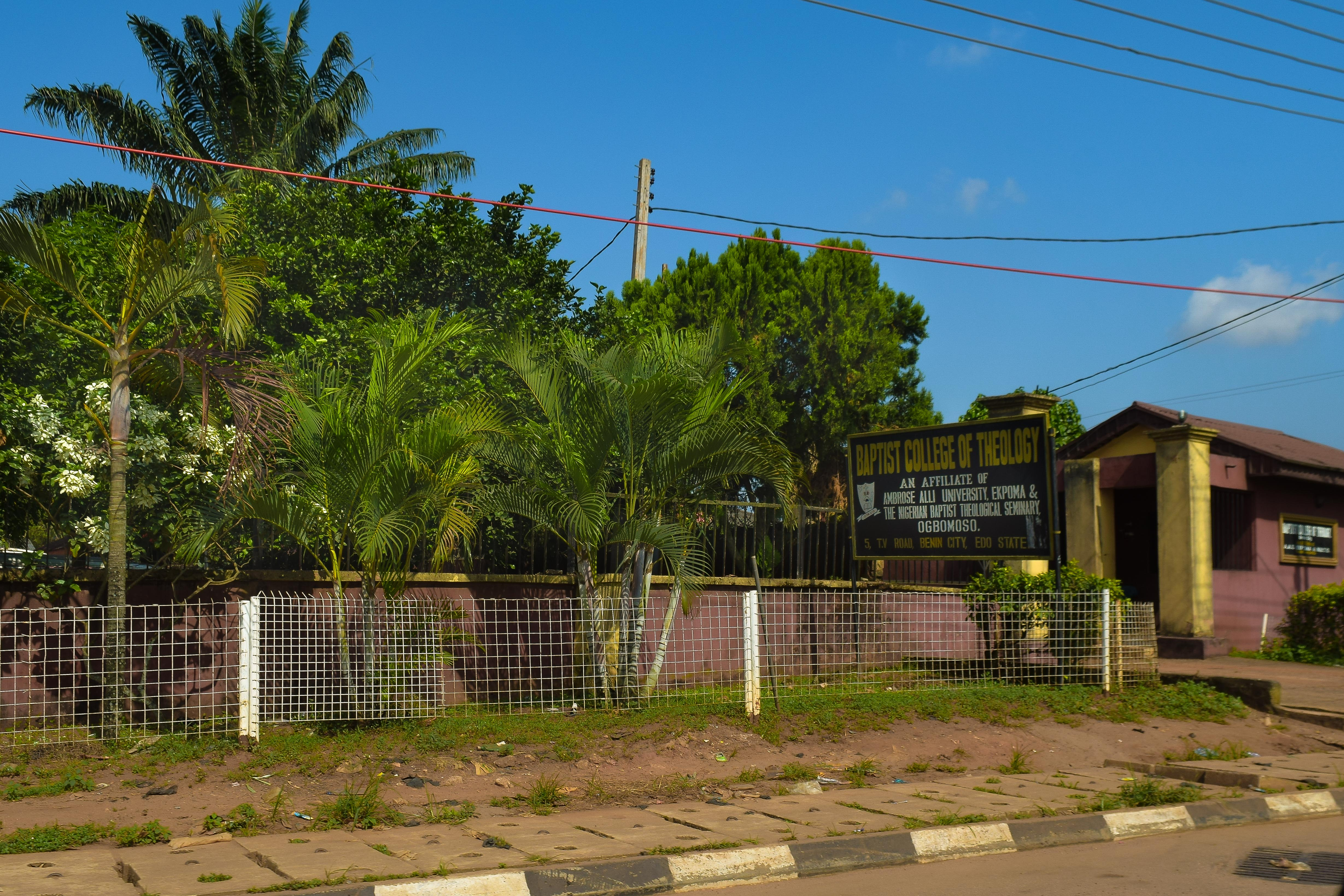

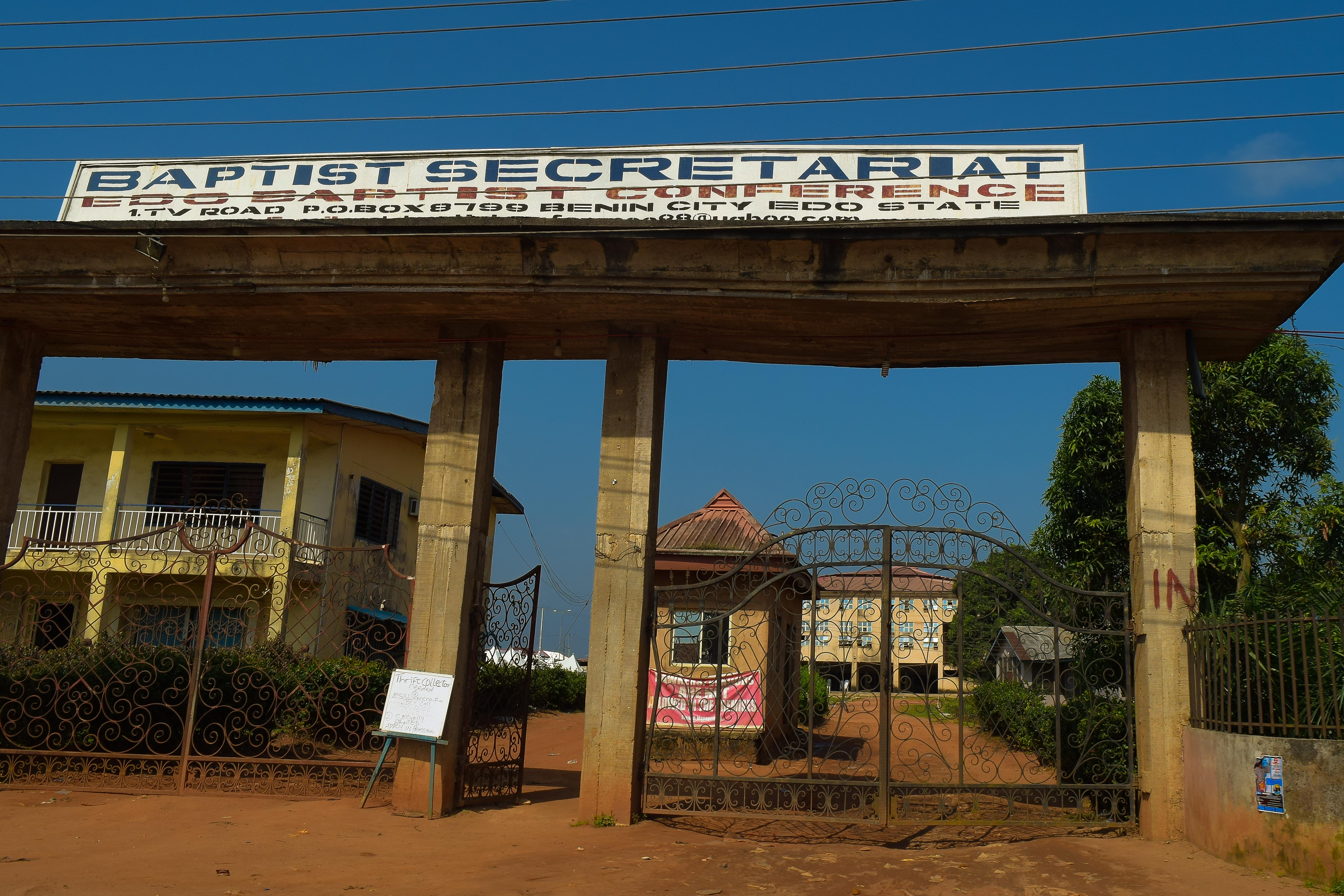

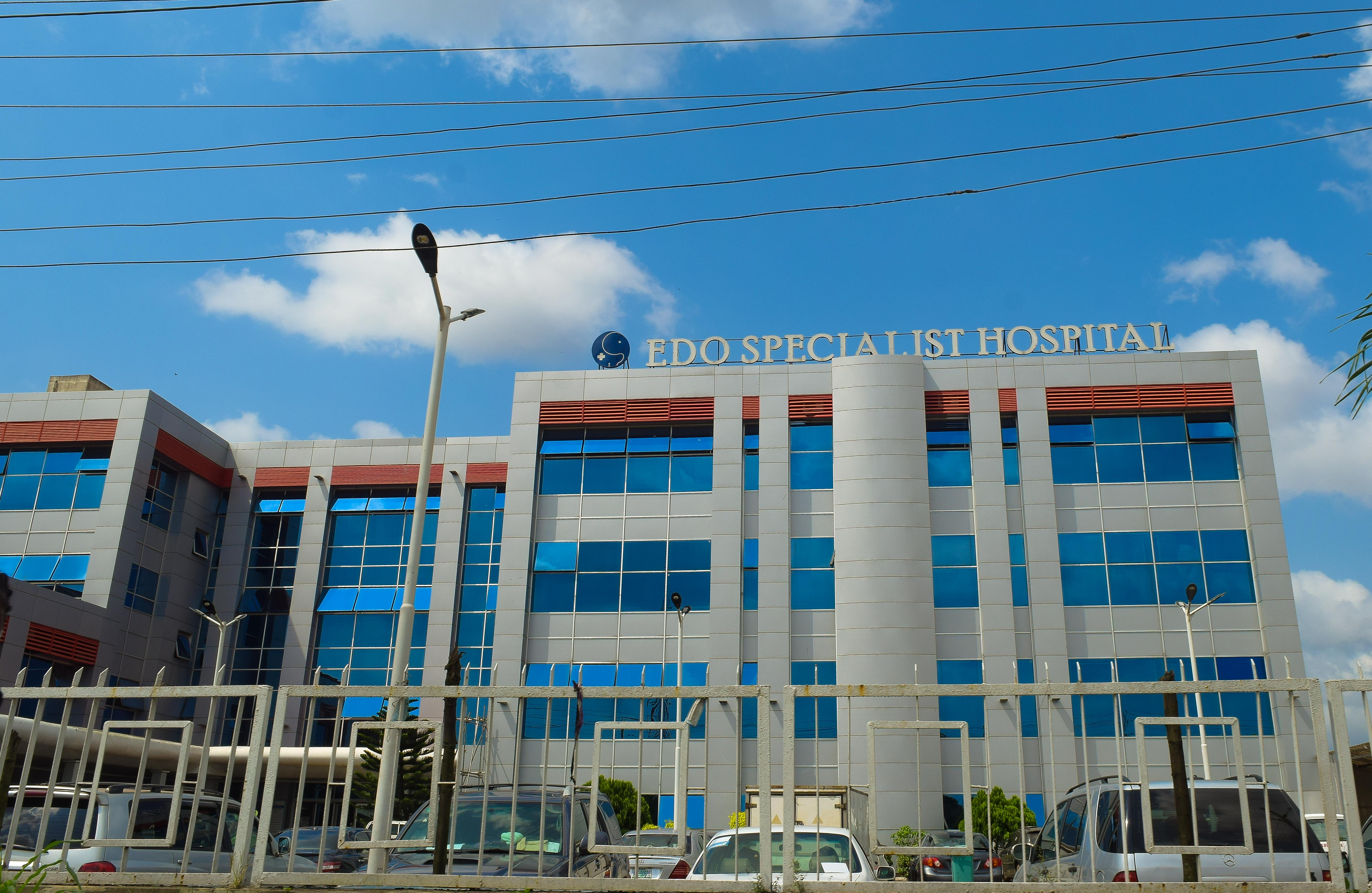

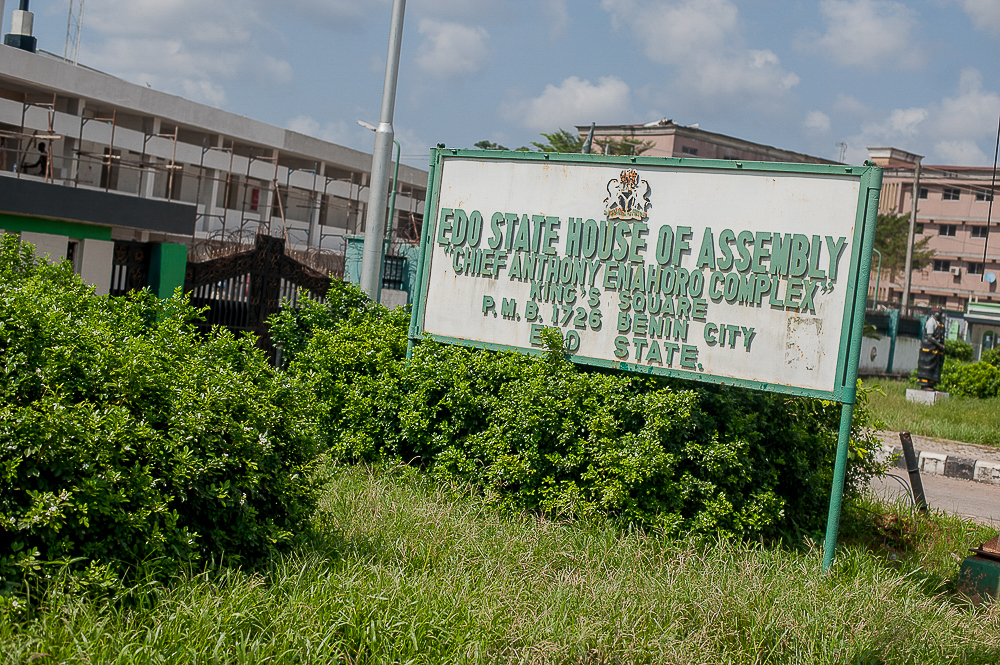

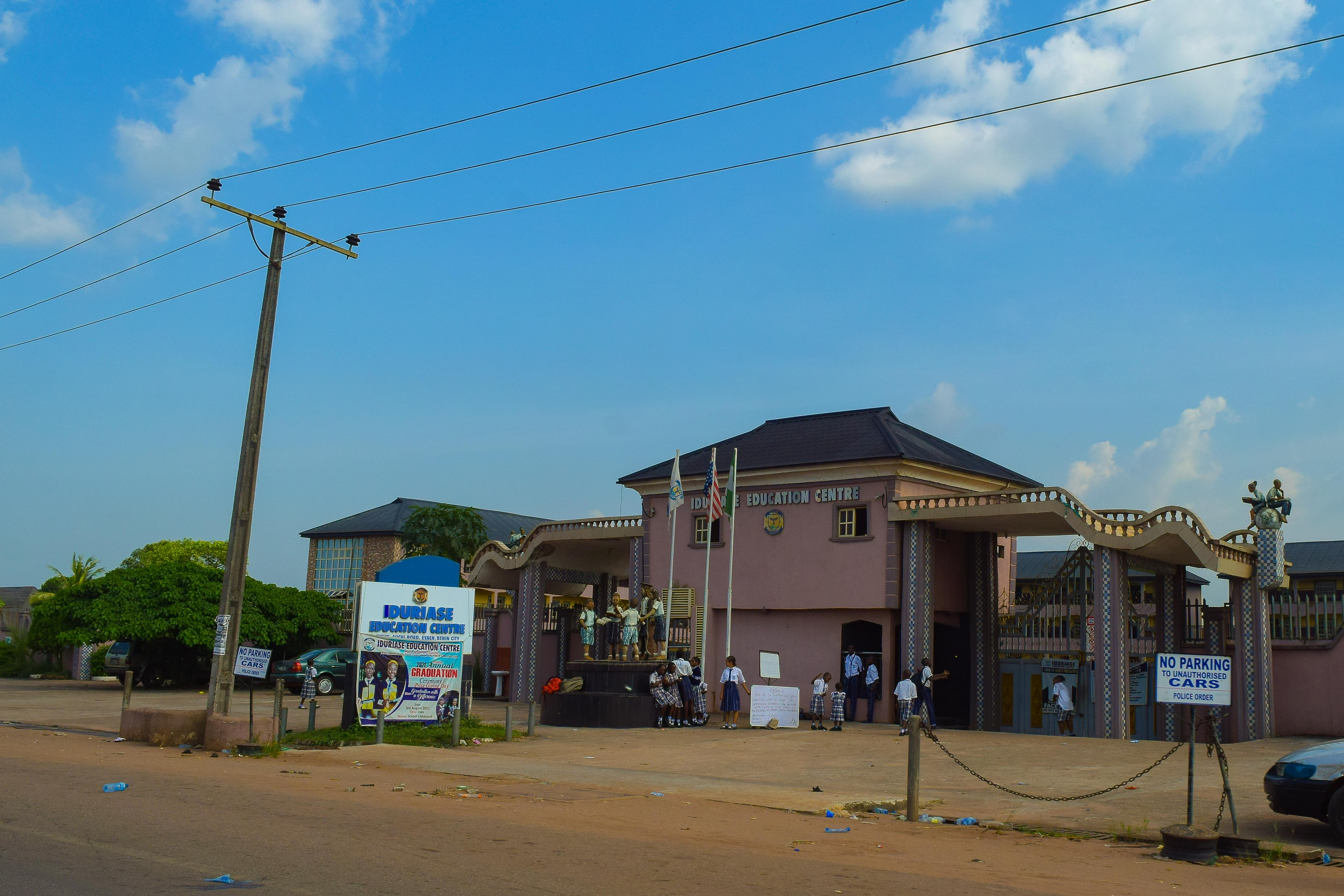

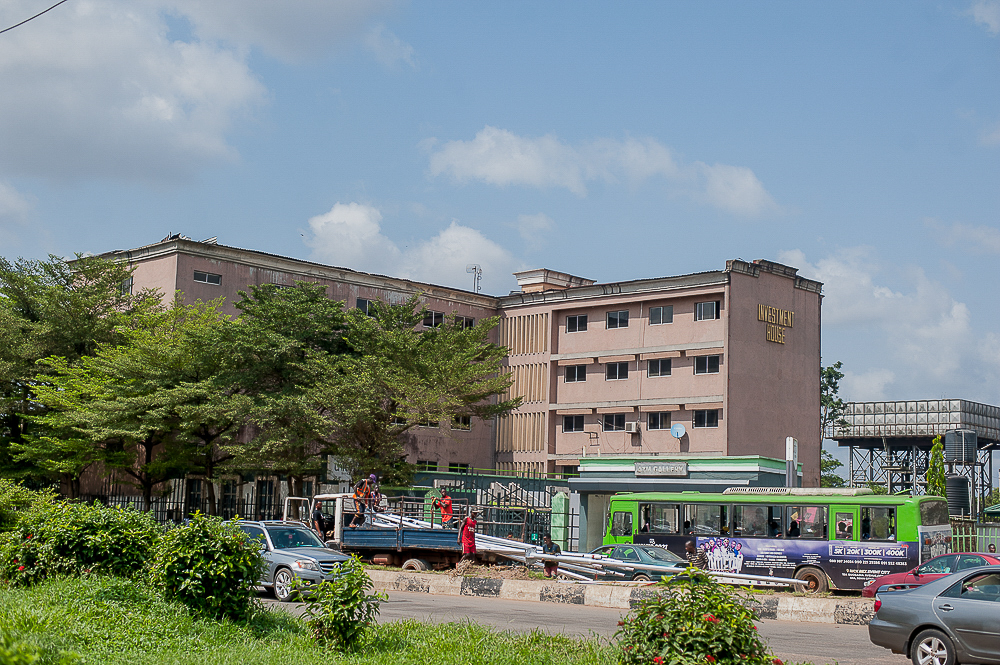

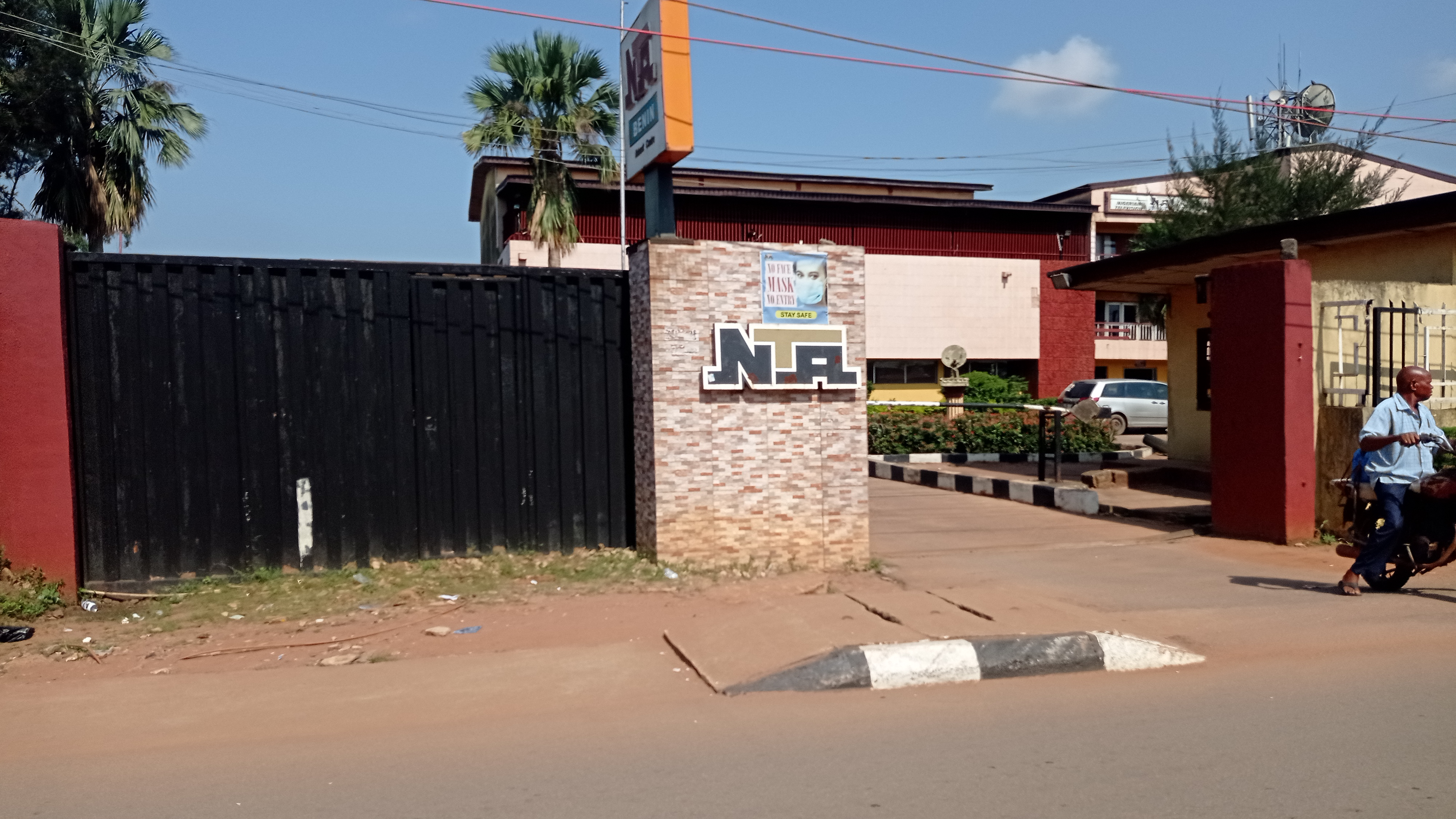

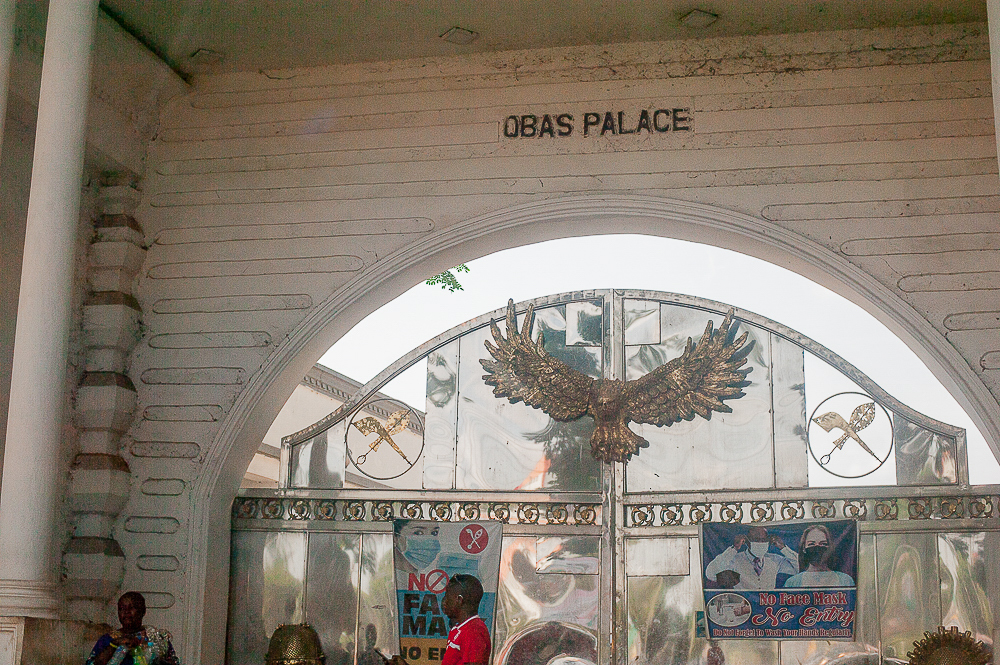

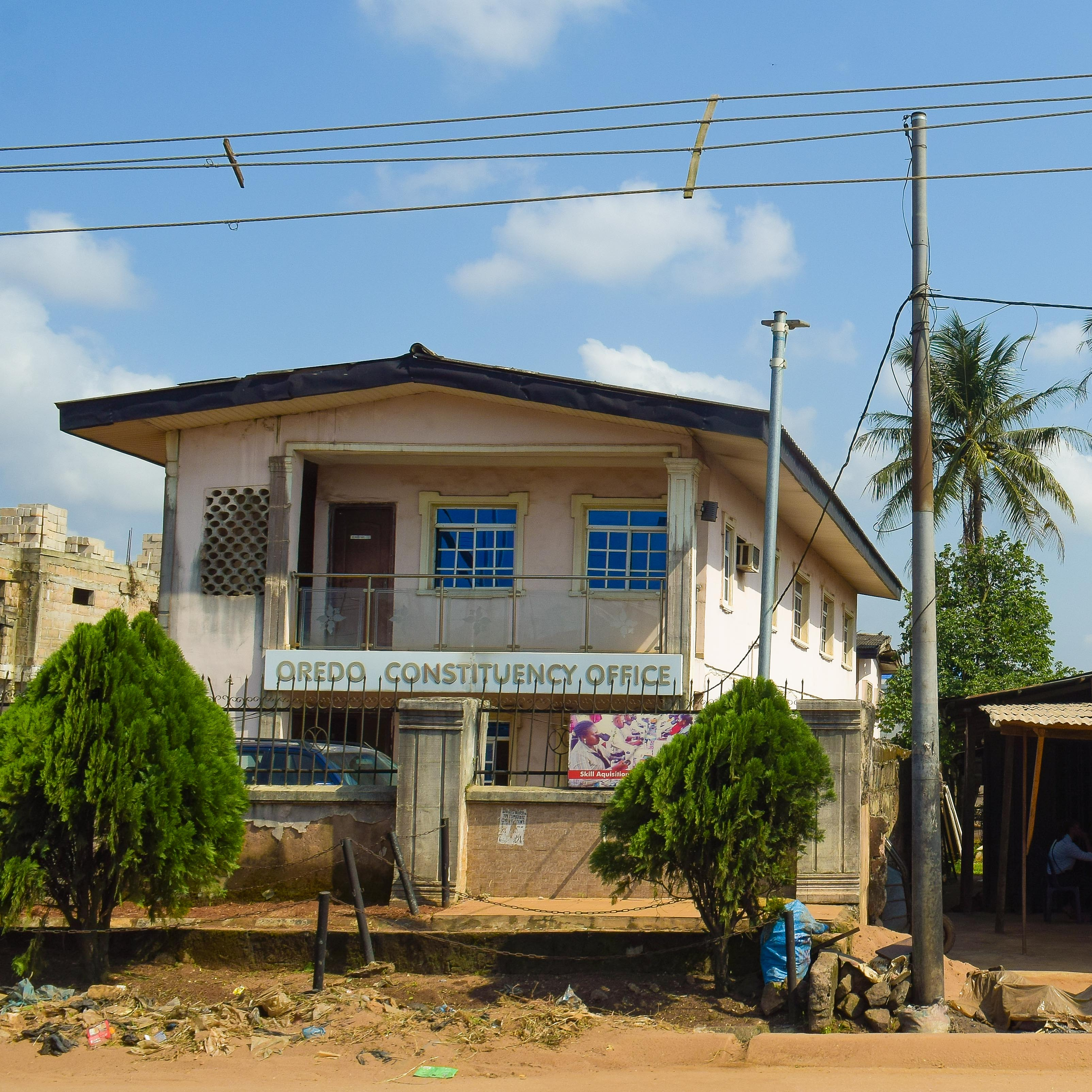

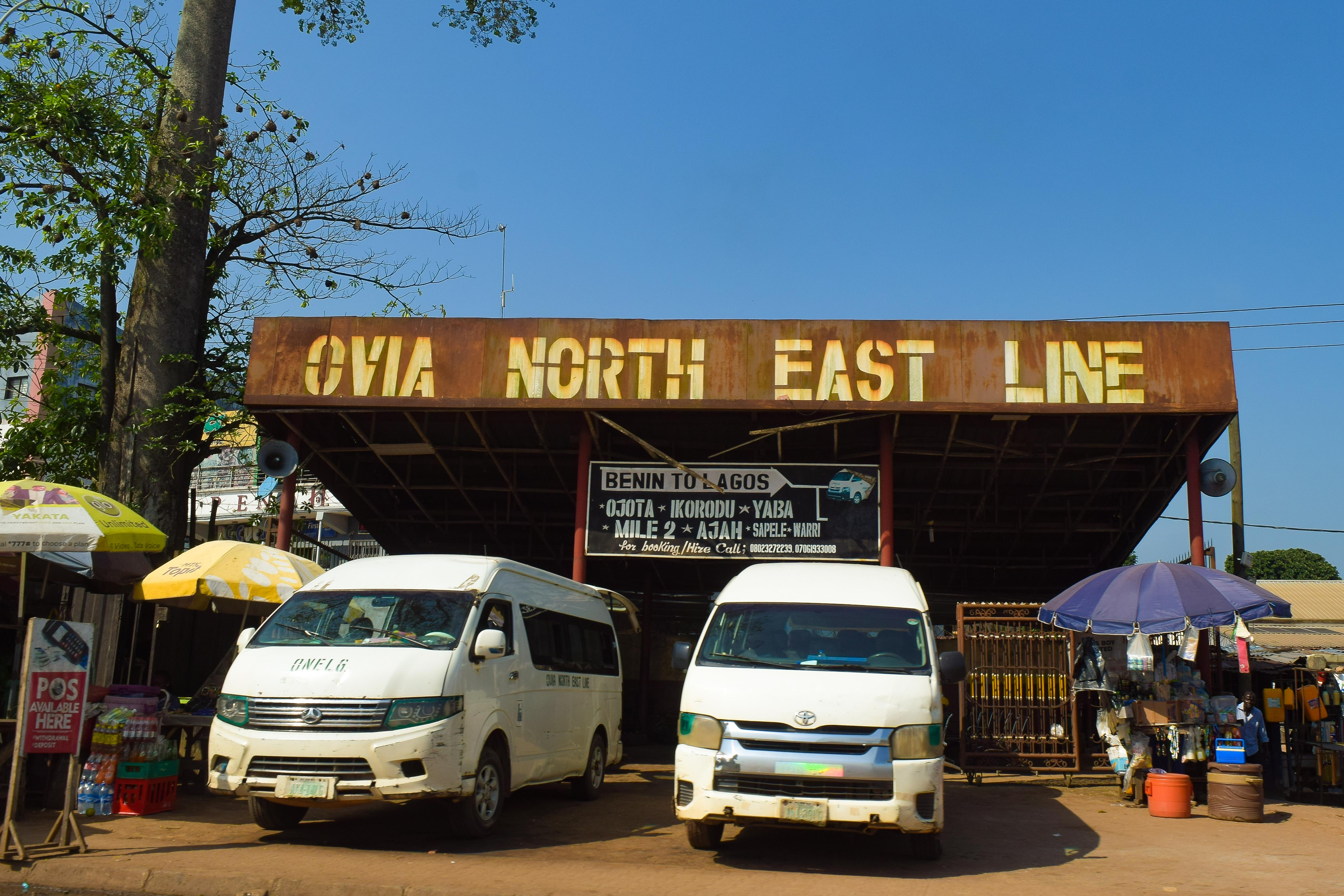

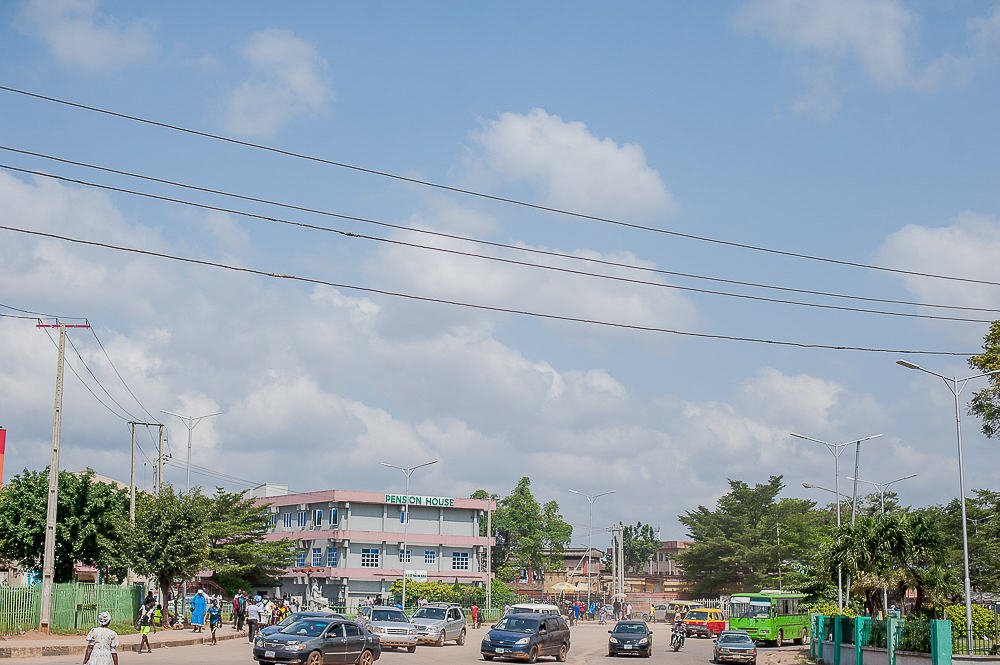

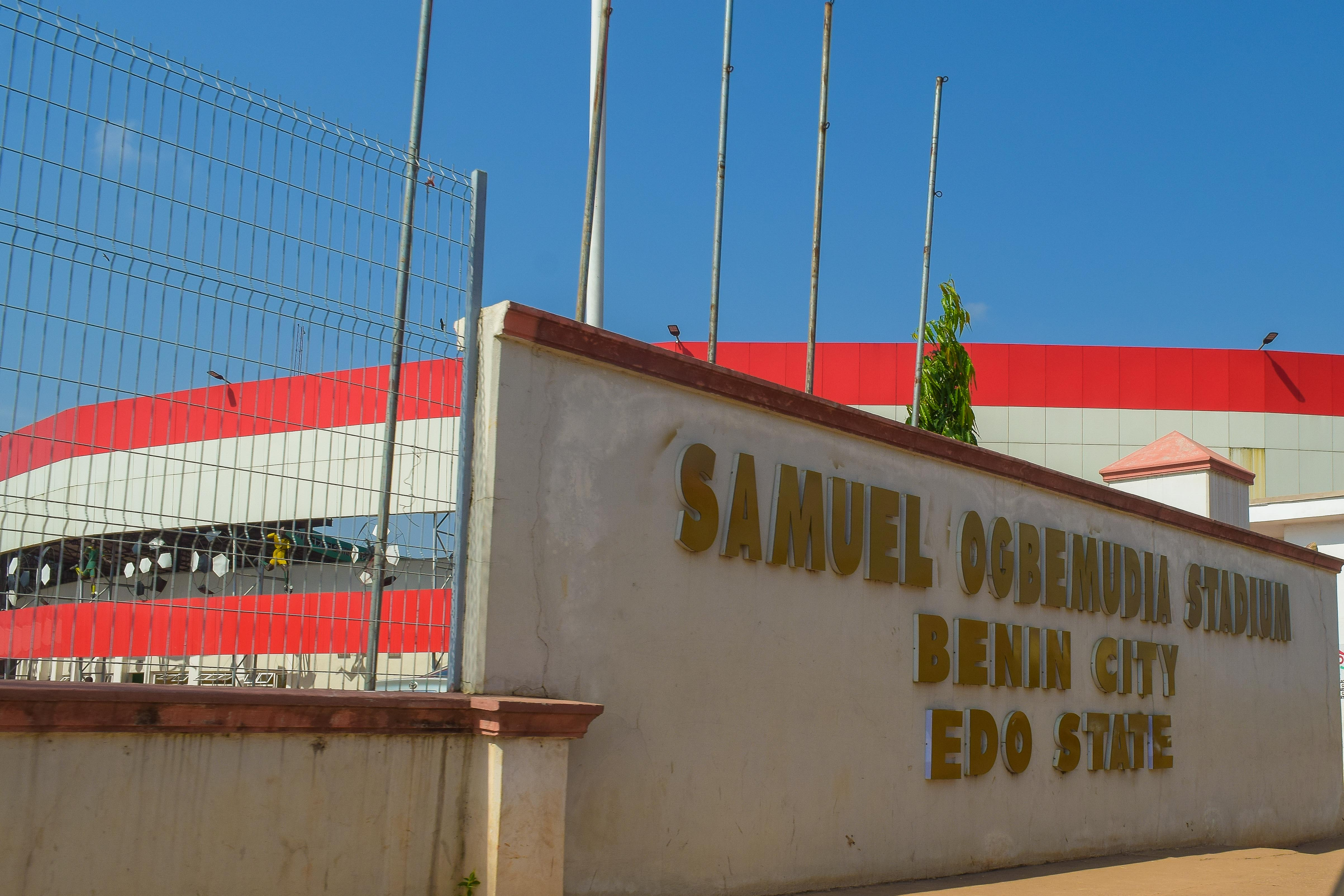

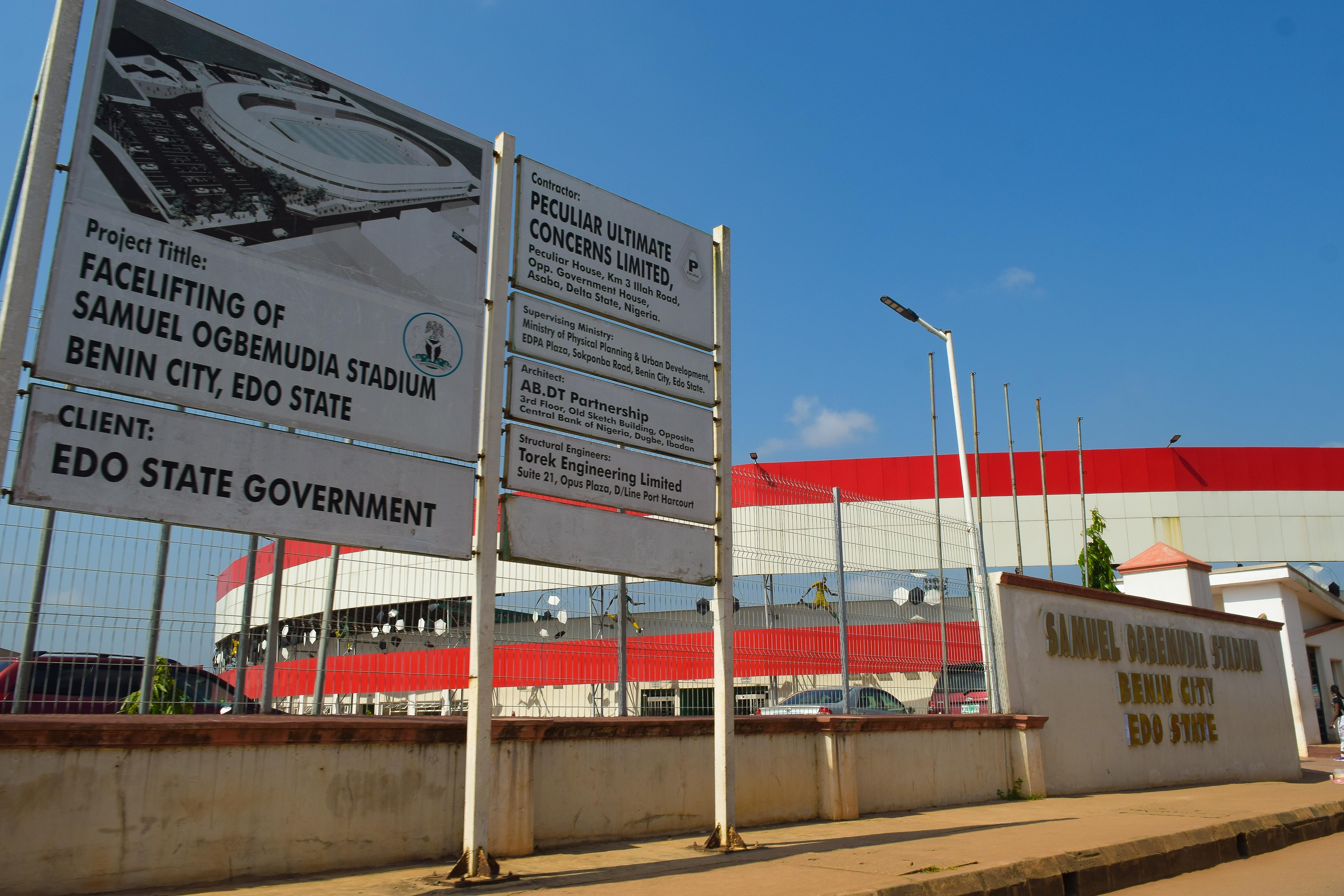

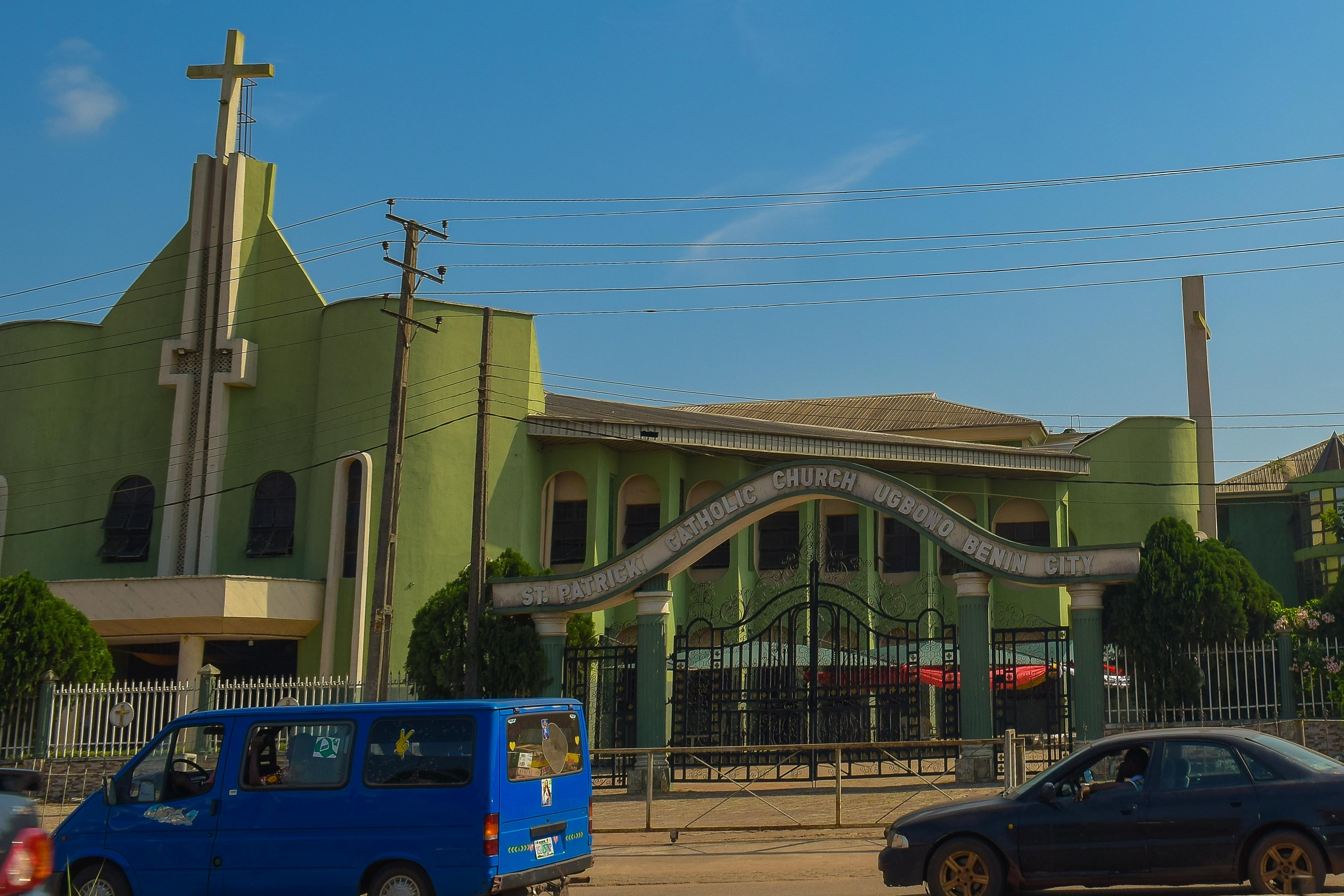

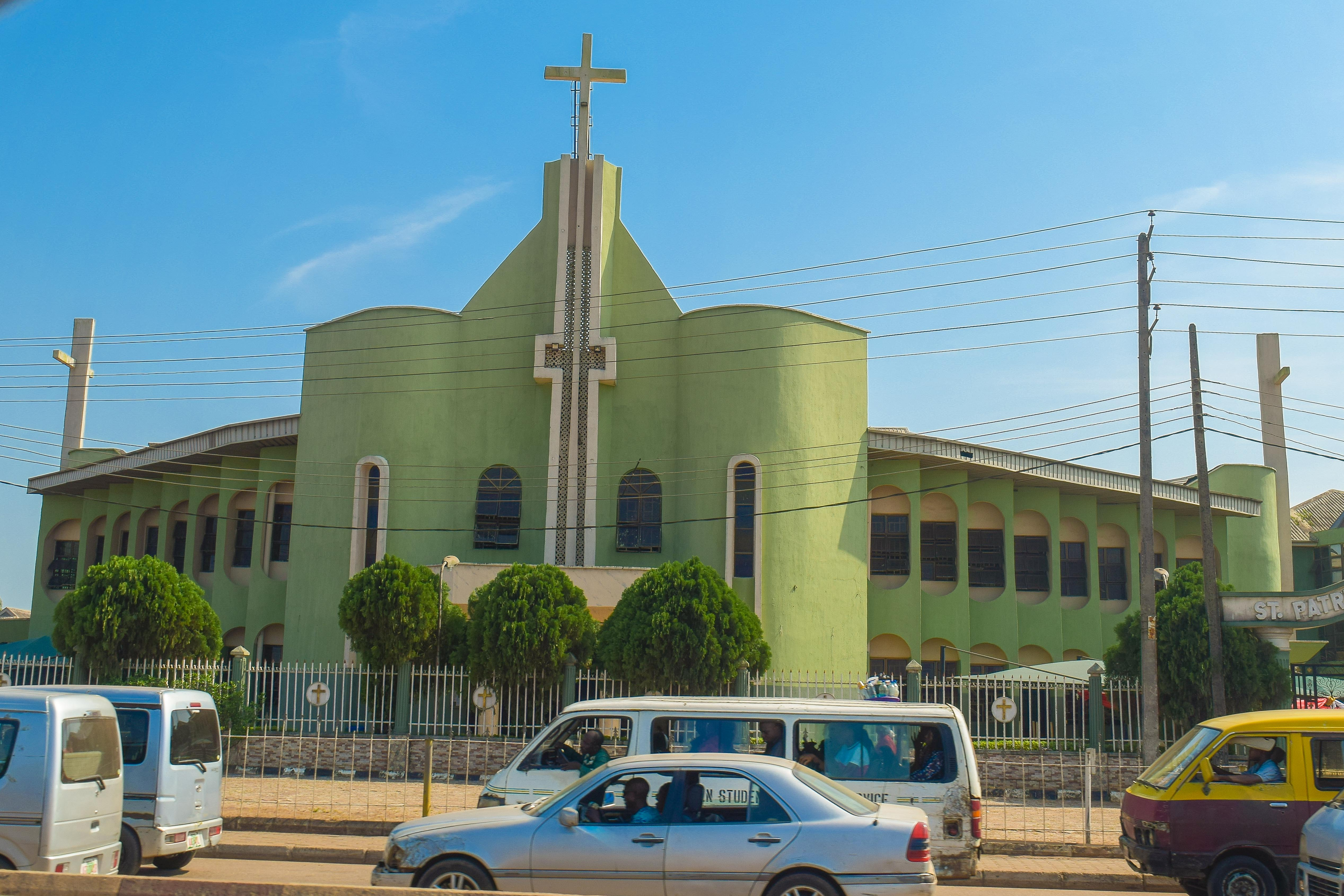

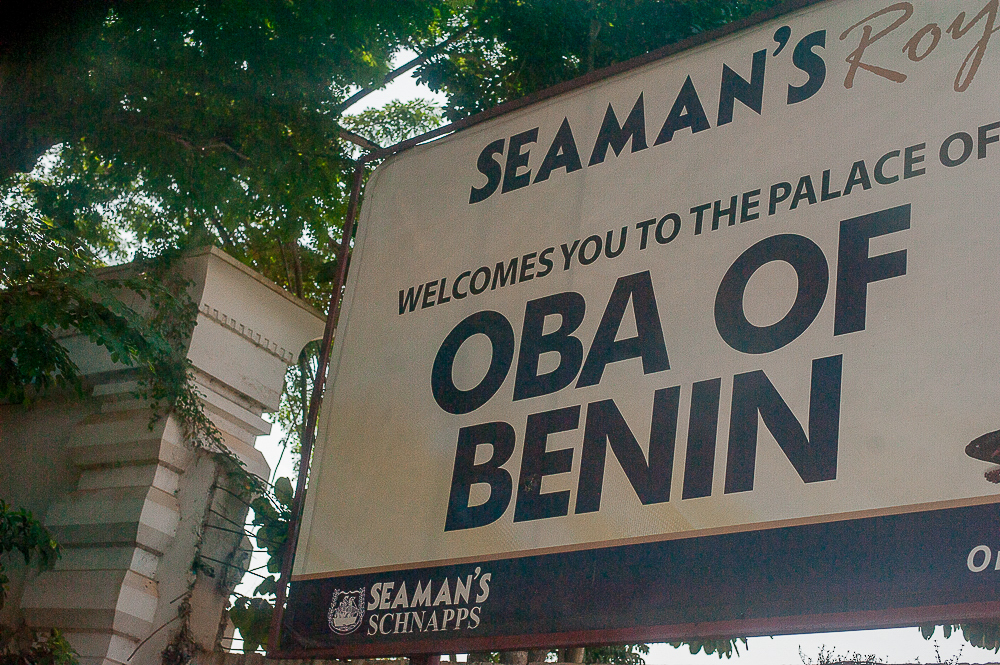

== Notable people ==
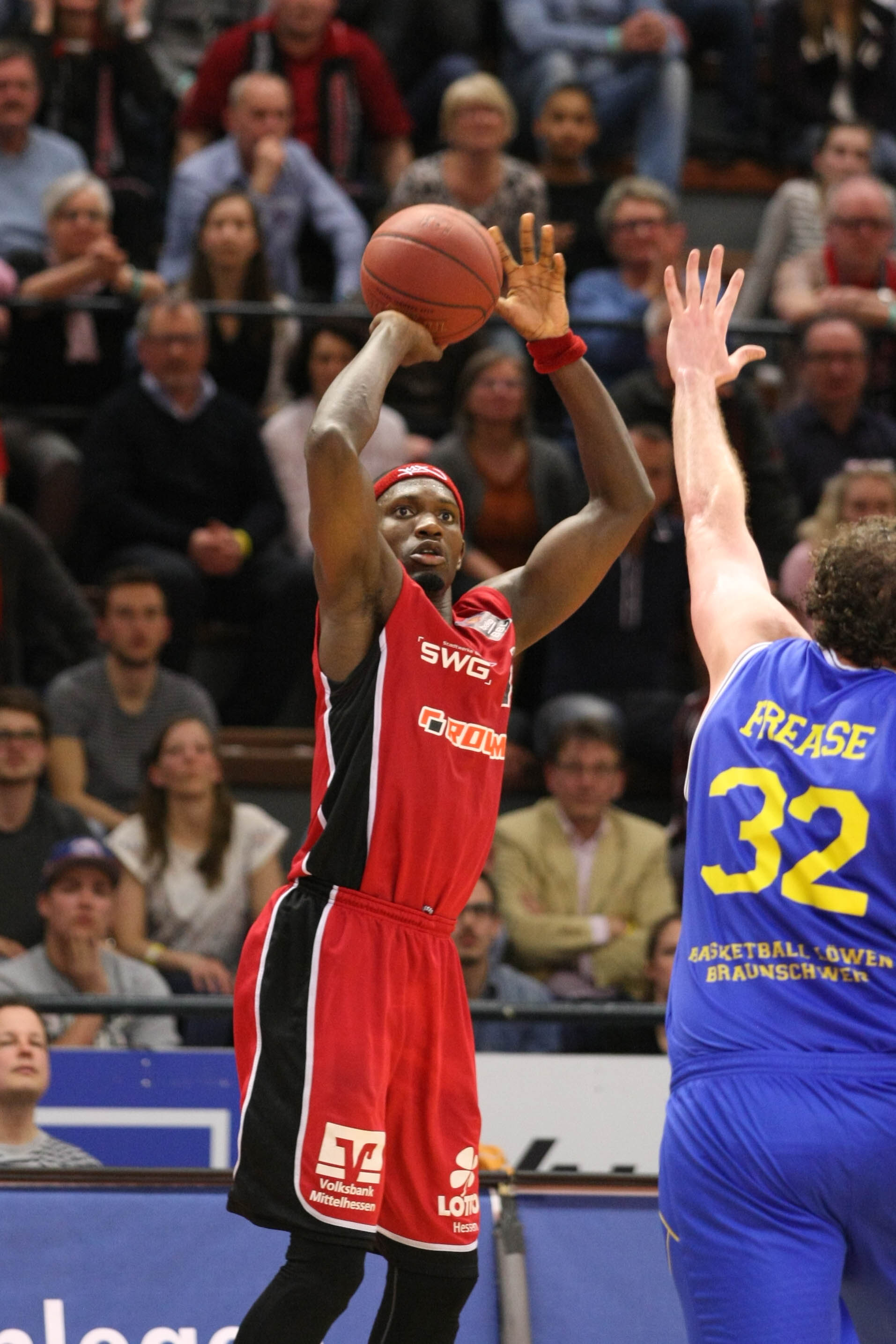
Suleiman Braimoh

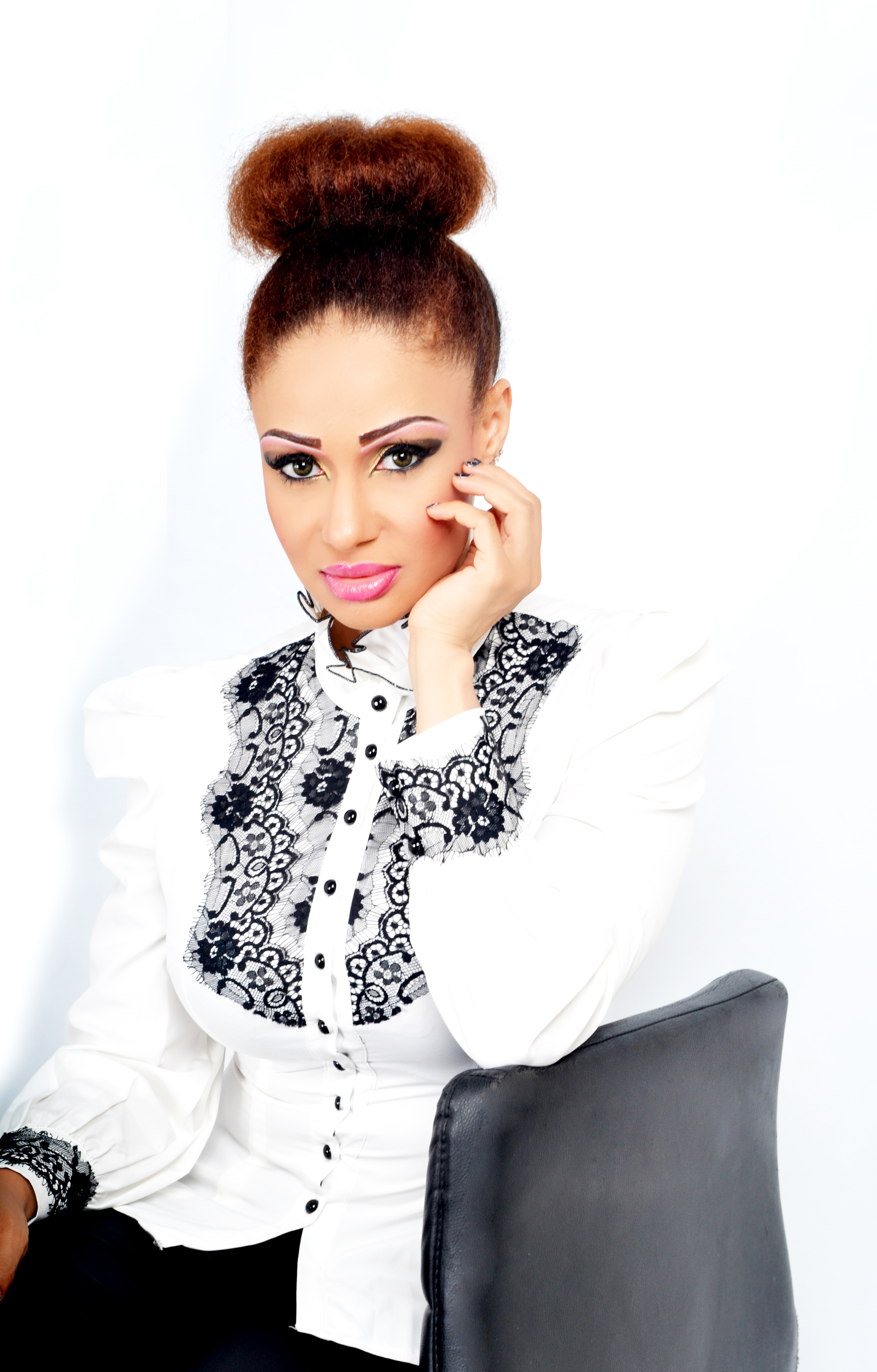
Modupe Ozolua

- Godwin Abbe, former Nigerian Minister for Interior and Defence
- Ambrose Folorunsho Alli, former governor of the defunct Bendel State. He created the Bendel State University now named after him as "Ambrose Alli University"
- Eghosa Asemota Agbonifo, politician
- Anthony Anenih, chairman, the board of trustees (PDP) and Nigeria's former Minister of Works
- Suleiman Braimoh (born 1989), Nigerian-American basketball player in the Israel Basketball Premier League
- Archbishop John Edokpolo, Minister of Trade and Founder of Edokpolor Grammar School
- Francis Edo-Osagie, businessman
- Jacob U. Egharevba, Bini historian and traditional chief
- Anthony Enahoro, anti-colonial and pro-democracy activist and politician
- Festus Ezeli, basketball player
- Abel Guobadia, former chairman of Nigeria's Independent National Electoral Commission
- Ovia Idah, Nigerian sculptor
- Benson Idahosa, Founder of Church of God Mission International Incorporated and Idahosa World Outreach (IWO)
- Felix Idubor, artist
- Felix Lebarty, musician
- Gabriel Igbinedion, businessman and Esama of Benin kingdom
- Divine Ikubor, known professionally as Rema, musician.
- Festus Iyayi, novelist and first African to win the Commonwealth Writers Prize
- Suleman Johnson, senior pastor and general overseer of Omega Fire Ministries International
- Godwin Obaseki, former governor of Edo State
- Samuel Ogbemudia, former governor of the Midwest region of Nigeria and later Bendel state
- Shallipopi, singer and songwriter
- Sonny Okosun, musician
- Suyi Davies Okungbowa, African fantasy and speculative fiction author
- Osasere Orumwense, former vice-chancellor of University of Benin
- Osayuki Godwin Oshodin, former vice-chancellor of University of Benin
- Demi Isaac Oviawe, Ireland-based actress
- Chris Oyakhilome, founder and president of Believers LoveWorld Incorporated, also known as Christ Embassy
- Modupe Ozolua, cosmetic surgeon
- Lilian Salami, former Vice-Chancellor of university of Benin
- Victor Uwaifo, musician

== Bibliography ==
- Bondarenko D. M. A Homoarchic Alternative to the Homoarchic State: Benin Kingdom of the Thirteenth - Nineteenth Centuries. Social Evolution & History. 2005. vol. 4, no 2. pp. 18–88.
