= MSE =

MSE may refer to:

== Education ==
- Master of Science in Engineering, a university degree
- Master of Science in Software Engineering, a college degree in software engineering
- Master of Software Engineering, a university degree; for example at the Information and Communications University

== Science, technology and engineering ==
- Manned Spaceflight Engineer, an astronaut in the United States Air Force's Manned Spaceflight Engineer Program
- Mars Surface Exploration
- Materials Science and Engineering
- Maunakea Spectroscopic Explorer, a planned renovation of the Canada–France–Hawaii Telescope
- Maximum spacing estimation, in statistics
- Mean squared error, in statistics
- Mechanically stabilized earth
- Mental status examination, used by clinicians to assess aspects of a patient's mental state
- Mercury Surface Element, the lander portion of BepiColombo space mission
- MSE (centrifuges), Measuring and Scientific Equipment, manufacturer of laboratory centrifuges
- Selenomethionine, a naturally occurring amino acid

=== Computing ===
- Message Stream Encryption, a BitTorrent protocol encryption
- Media Source Extensions, a W3C standard for JavaScript media streaming
- Metasearch engine, a search engine that consolidates results from other search engines
- Microsoft Security Essentials, a free antivirus software
- Mobile Subscriber Equipment, a tactical communications system formerly used by units such as the 17th Signal Battalion (United States)

== Stock exchanges ==
- Macedonian Stock Exchange
- Madras Stock Exchange
- Madrid Stock Exchange
- Malawi Stock Exchange
- Malta Stock Exchange
- Mongolian Stock Exchange
- Montenegro Stock Exchange
- Montreal Stock Exchange

== Other ==
- Kent International Airport, by IATA airport code
- Mississippi Export Railroad, common freight carrier in Mississippi, by reporting mark
- Martha Stewart Everyday, a mass-market brand of Martha Stewart Living Omnimedia sold through Kmart
- Medical Science Educator, academic journal
- Melbourne String Ensemble
- Micro and Small Enterprises
- Ministry of Sustainability and the Environment, in Singapore
- MoneySavingExpert.com, a British consumer finance information website
- Monumental Sports & Entertainment, American sports and venue management company
- Odakyu 60000 Series MSE, a train part of the Romancecar family
