= Ken Hill =

Ken, Kenneth or Kenny Hill may refer to:

- Kenneth Hill (academic) (1911–1973), British pathologist and academic
- Ken Hill (playwright) (1937–1995), British playwright and theatre director
- Kenneth O. Hill (born 1939), Canadian physicist
- Ken Hill (botanist) (Kenneth D. Hill, 1948–2010), Australian botanist
- Kenny Hill (English footballer) (born 1953), English football player
- Kenny Hill (defensive back) (born 1958), American football defensive back
- Ken Hill (baseball) (born 1965), American baseball pitcher
- Kenny Hill (rugby league) (born 1968), rugby league footballer of the 1980s and 1990s
- Kenny Hill (quarterback) (Kenneth Wade Hill, Jr., born 1994), American football quarterback
- Ken Hill (motorcyclist) (born 1964), American motorcyclist
- Ken Hill (Australian footballer) (born 1950), Australian rules footballer
- Kenny Hill railway station, Currans Hill, New South Wales, Australia

== See also ==
- Beck Row, Holywell Row and Kenny Hill, a civil parish in Suffolk, England
- Kenny Hill, former name of Bukit Tunku, a neighbourhood in Kuala Lumpur, Malaysia
- Wild Ken Hill in Norfolk, England
- Hill (surname)
