= Osayuki Godwin Oshodin =

Nigerian academic (1950–2022)

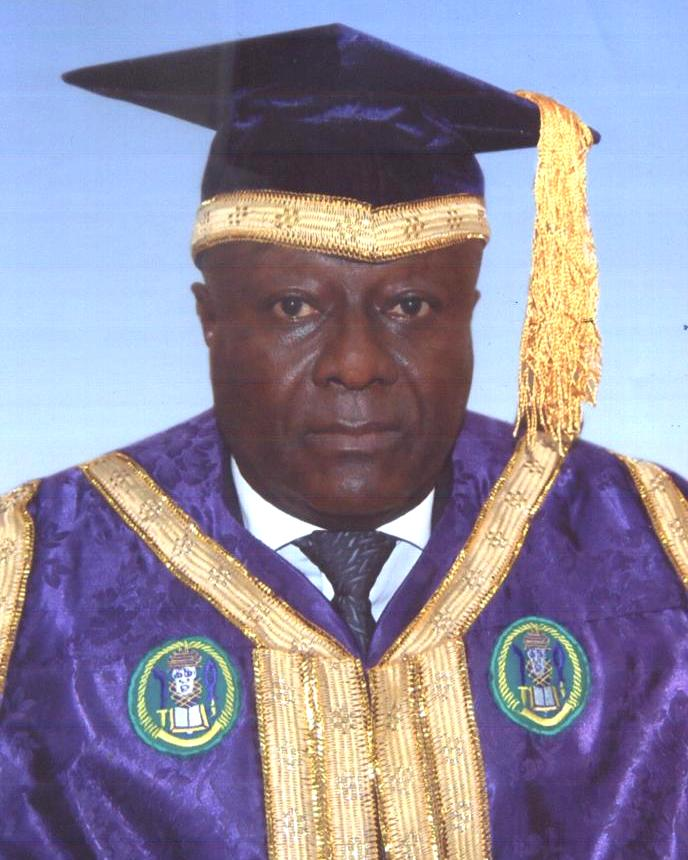

Vice-Chancellor of the University of Benin
- In office 30 November 2009 – 30 November 2014
- Preceded by: Emmanuel Nwanze
- Succeeded by: Osasere Orumwense

Personal details
- Born: 9 August 1950 Benin City, Southern Region, British Nigeria (now in Edo State, Nigeria)
- Died: 29 May 2022 (aged 71) Benin City, Edo State, Nigeria
- Spouse: Otasowie Oshodin
- Education: Columbia University; City University of New York; Central State University, Ohio
- Occupation: Health educator
- Profession: Academic
- Website: www.uniben.edu/users/prof-og-oshodin

Osayuki Godwin Oshodin, (9 August 1950 – 29 May 2022) was a Nigerian academic who was the vice-chancellor of the University of Benin from 2009 to 2014. He was a professor of health education and published several journals and books concerning health and education.

Oshodin was born in Benin City. He attended the Western Boys High School, Benin City, Federal School of Science, Lagos State, Central State University Ohio, Columbia University of New York city, United States and received a doctor of education degree (Ed.D.) from Teachers College, Columbia University of New York city in 1980. He joined the university as Research Fellow in 1981 and rose to the position of professor in 1991. Oshodin was an External Examiner to more than 15 Universities. He was also a member of 20 Learned Societies and had 41 Awards and Honours to his credit. His administrative acumen in the university was also very robust; he was either a chairman or member of more than 35 university Boards and Committees. He was Director, Sports, Dean; faculty of Education and had also been Dean; Students Affairs. He has to himself more than 78 academic publications, books and 27 other books as co-author. He was appointed the vice-chancellor of University of Benin in November 2009 and his tenure ended in November 2014.

== Education ==
Oshodin attended Western Boys high School, Benin City in 1966, Federal School Of Science, Lagos State in 1971, where he obtained his WASC, now West African Senior School Certificate Examination and GCE Advanced Level respectively. In 1972, he obtained a certificate in alcohol education from Central State University Ohio. He graduated in 1976 from the City College of the City University of New York where he obtained a BSc in Biology/Medical Anthropology.

Oshodin held a Master of Science degree from Hunter College of City University of New York in 1978 where he studied Health Science/Community Health Education. He obtained his Ed.D. (doctorate degree) in Health Education from the Teachers College Columbia University of New York city in 1980.

== Academic career ==
Oshodin taught over 20 different health education and research courses at the postgraduate and undergraduate level both in Nigeria and the United States of America. He worked as a college/research assistant, at the Hunter College of City University of New York in 1974 to 1979. In 1981, he lectured at Hunter College of City University of New York in the Department of Academic skill/sieek, where he taught health education, anatomy and physiology, biostatistics, health science and community health. He later moved to University of Benin and lectured part-time between 1982 and 1983, and was promoted to the position of a Senior Lecturer in Health Education in the Department of Physical and Health Education in 1987.

In 1991, he rose to the position of a professor at the same university, same year he was honoured by Marquis Macmillan directory division "Who's Who in The World" 10th Edition. Since 1990, 1996, 1999, 2002, and 2006, till 2022, he was an external examiner to University of Nigeria, Nsukka, Ambrose Alli University, Ekpoma, University of Ilorin, University of Ibadan and University of Port Harcourt respectively. He was conferred a certified teacher by Teachers Registration Council of Nigeria in 2006.

In November 2009, Oshodin was appointed vice-chancellor of the University of Benin, making him the first Edo man of Benin descent to occupy the position since the university was established in 1970.

== Honours and awards ==
- "Who is who in the World" 10th edition (1991–1992) published by MARQUIS MACMILLAN directory division, 3002 Glen-view road Whihette, Illinois 6000091, United States.
- Leadership Award- Millinium edition of the international, directory of distinguished leadership. 2000
- justice of Peace (JP) Appointment by Edo State Government, 12 September 2001.

== Selected publications ==
- "Alcohol Abuse Among High School Student In Benin City, Nigeria". Drug and Alcohol Dependence, Vol. 7, (1981) pp. 141–145 (Lausanne-Switzerland). (Indexed and Foreign).
- "Alcohol Abuse: A case study of secondary school student in rural Areas of Bendel district". Drug and Alcohol Dependence, Vol. 8, (1981) pp. 141–145 (Lausanne-Switzerland). (Indexed and Foreign).
- "Alcohol Abuse Among Nigeria College student in New York area of the United States". College Student Journal. Vol. 16, no. 2, (1982). pp 153–157 Prof. Russell N. Cassels, 1362 Santa Cruz court, Chula vista. California 92016, USA (Published by project innovation – a group of university Professor interested in improved sharing of worthwhile professional theory and research. (Indexed and Foreign)
- "Alcohol Poisoning among children in Benin city, Nigeria". Nigeria Medical Practitioner, Vol No 1 (1998), pp. 21–23. (Indexed And Foreign)
- "Drug and the Adolescent". West African Journal of Human Kinetics, Health, Physical Education, Recreation Leisure and Sport Management. Department of Physical and Health Education. Ahmadu Bello University, Zaria.
- "Female-Based Violence and Family Planning practice of married women in Nigeria police barracks". by Dr. (Mrs) Ujiro Igbudu and Prof O. G. Oshodin. Journal of Research and Development in Education, University of Winneba, Ghana.

== Books ==
- A Guide to Teaching Methods and Material in Health Education
- Teachers Education Part-Time Programs in Nigeria
- International Business Management and Global Education
