= Ojougboh =

Ojougboh is a surname. Notable people with the surname include:

- Nkem Ojougboh (born 1987), Nigerian basketball player
- Cairo Godson Ojougboh (1959–2024), Nigerian politician and medical doctor
