= Winifred Akpani =

Nigerian businesswoman

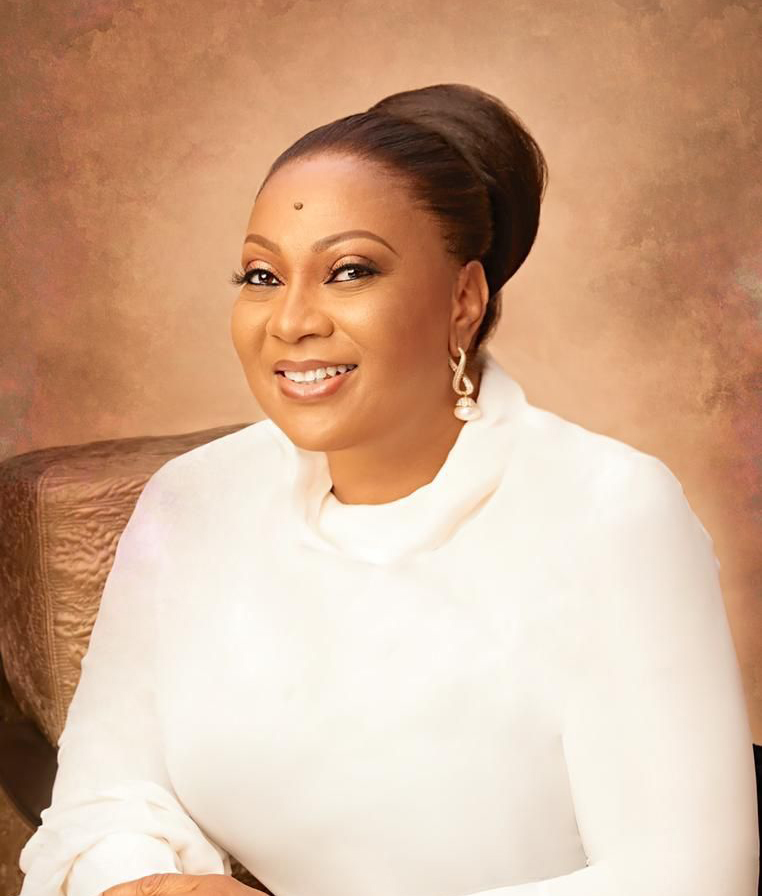
- Education: University of Benin; University of Lagos
- Occupations: Businesswoman, entrepreneur, founder and CEO of Northwest Petroleum & Gas Company Limited, chairperson of Depots and Petroleum Products Marketers Association of Nigeria (DAPPMAN)
- Spouse(s): Walter Akpani (MD/CEO, Providus Bank Limited)

Winifred Akpani OFR is a Nigerian businesswoman and entrepreneur recognized for her contributions to the oil and gas industry. She is a chartered accountant and the founder and chief executive officer of Northwest Petroleum & Gas Company Limited, an indigenous petroleum products marketing company based in Nigeria.

== Early life and education ==
Akpani earned a Bachelor of Science degree in mathematics from the University of Benin, Benin City. She subsequently obtained a postgraduate diploma in Computer Science from the University of Lagos.

She is a fellow of both the Institute of Chartered Accountants of Nigeria (FCA) and the Institute of Directors.

== Career ==
Akpani began her career as a trainee accountant at Oni Lasebikan and Co. (now Ernst & Young) in 1987. She subsequently joined Arthur Anderson & Co. (now KPMG Professional Services), where she qualified as a chartered accountant in 1990. She held the position of audit senior until her departure in 1992.

In 1992, Akpani joined Flame Petroleum & Gas Company Limited as a financial controller, and was promoted to executive director in 1997.

In 1998, she founded Northwest Petroleum & Gas Company Limited with an initial capital of ₦200,000. The company began by distributing diesel in 200-litre drums to homes, guest houses, banks, and corporations. Over time, Northwest Petroleum expanded its operations to include international oil trading and service transactions, as well as investments in the midstream and upstream sectors of the Nigerian oil and gas industry.

== Contributions and affiliations ==
In 2019, Akpani was elected the new chairman of the Depot and Petroleum Products Marketers Association of Nigeria (DAPPMAN).

== Personal life ==
She is married to Walter Akpani, the managing director and CEO of Providus Bank Limited.
