= Victor Atokolo =

Nigerian pastor

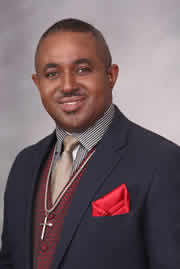
- Born: Victor Akogu Atokolo; 18 April 1969; Idah, Kogi State. Nigeria
- Occupations: Teacher, pastor, radio host and author
- Known for: Revelation Truth
- Website: http://victoratokolo.org

Notes
- Teacher of Revelation Truth with Emphasis on the Mysteries of Redemption and Teachings on doing Exploits by Faith

Victor Atokolo (born 1969) is a Nigerian Christian pastor, teacher, radio host and author.

== Early life ==
Victor Akogu Atokolo was born in Idah on 18 April 1969 to Elder James and Mrs Martha Atokolo (both from Idah local government area of Kogi State, Nigeria). The fifth of seven children, he had his primary education in Idah before attending Federal Government College, Ugwolawo, Kogi State. In 1991, he earned a degree in accounting from the University of Benin. He spent one year (1992/1993) at Eruwa, a town in Oyo state, for the mandatory National Youth Service Corps (NYSC).

== Ministry ==
Rev. Victor Atokolo is the apostolic overseer of Word Aflame Ministries International, and senior pastor of Word Aflame Family Church (WAFC) with headquarters in Abuja (FCT) and a branch in Benue State (Makurdi).

In 1993, Rev. Atokolo was commissioned into Ministry with a mandate from God to "Unveil to His people the Mysteries of Redemption and Teach them to do Exploits through Faith". This led to the establishment of Word Aflame Assembly, now Word Aflame Family Church (WAFC), in 1994. Over the years, other arms of the Ministry were formed, including Victor Atokolo Word Outreach(VAWO), Intercede Nigeria, Global Ministers’ Connect, Kheh-sed Bible Training Centre and Campus Aflame Fellowship(CAFEL).

== Works ==
Rev. Atokolo is a radio host and the author of FreshWord Meditations, a daily devotional. Some of his published books include How to Receive From God, Dynamics of Excellent Living, The Joy of Sexual Purity, and The Power of Meditation. He is on the International Presbytery of Faith Revival for All Nations Bible Institute (FrenBi), Lusaka, Zambia, and an instructor and a board member at the Fields of Glory International Missions Training School, Sacramento. As the overseer of Word Aflame Family Church, he has hosted events such as RhemaFestival, PnuemaFestival, Feast of Fire, Eagles’ Summit, Breakthroughs Miracles and Worship, Intimacy, and has regular speaking engagements within and outside Nostalgia.

== Brexit and Trump predictions ==
Atokolo in July 2016 predicted Donald Trump would be elected president of the United States of America. According to him, Trump's victory would impede the movement toward a one-world government. He also believed that if Hillary Clinton of the Democrats had won the election, a chain of events would have ensued that would intensify the persecution of Christians and Jews.

In a video interview released on his official page months before the US General Elections, he said the world would have been taken over by Anti-Christ if Hillary Clinton had won. According to him, "The movement was towards a one-world government and consequently the one-world religion as well as the full revelation of the anti-Christ. If the moves by the Democratic had succeeded, we would have ended up having a one-world government. That would have intensified the persecution of Christians and the Jews and the eventual manifestation of the Anti-Christ. You will recall that within the last five years, Christians around the world had been persecuted more than any other season since the first century of the Church. This resulted in the murder of thousands of Christians in the Middle East by the ISIS as well as here in Nigeria where several lives have been wasted by the Boko Haram. All these have been happening because the American government turned the other cheek. However the exit of Britain from the European Union has impeded the move to introduce one-world government".

== Personal life ==
He married Franca Onyeje in January 1999. They have three children and live in Abuja, the Federal Capital Territory (FCT), Nigeria.
