= Ebosele =

Ebosele may refer to:

- Elizabeth Ebosele, Nigerian public administrator
- Festy Ebosele (born 2002), Irish association footballer
- Lystus Ebosele (born 2001), Irish powerlifter
- Patrick Ebosele Ekpu (1931–2024), Nigerian archbishop
- Tessy Ebosele (born 2002), a track and field athlete
