= Lilian Salami =

Nigerian academic and nutritionist (born 1956)

10th Vice-Chancellor of the University of Benin
- Incumbent
- Assumed office 2 December 2019
- Preceded by: Osasere Orumwense
- Succeeded by: Edoba Omoregie

Personal details
- Born: 8 August 1956 (age 70) Jos, Northern Region, British Nigeria (now in Plateau State, Nigeria)
- Education: University of Benin; University of Nigeria; North Dakota State University; Vaal University of Technology
- Occupation: Nutritionist
- Profession: Academic

Lilian Imuetinyan Salami (born 8 August 1956) is a Nigerian academic who was the vice-chancellor of the University of Benin between 2 December 2019 to 2 December 2024. She is the second female vice-chancellor of the university after Grace Alele-Williams in 1985. She was director-general/chief executive of the National Institute for Educational Planning and Administration (NIEPA), Ondo State, Nigeria.

A former dean, faculty of education at the University of Benin, Salami is a Fellow of the Nutrition Society of Nigeria and International Federation of Home Economics/Home Professional Association of Nigeria.

Salami is a professor of home economics/nutritional education and a member of the advisory council to the Oba of Benin, Omo N'Oba N'Edo, Ukukpolokpolo, Ogidigan, Oba Ewuare II.

== Early life and education ==
Salami was born in Jos, Nigeria. However, she is from Edo, specifically a Bini woman. She began her early childhood education in Jos, Plateau State, but due to the Nigerian Civil War from 1967 to 1970 she went to secondary school in Edo State, where she earned a West African School Certificate (WASSCE) under the auspices of Baptist High School, Benin City. She earned B.Sc. (Hons) home economics degree in 1972 and M.Sc. nutrition degree in 1982 at North Dakota State University, United States. She was at the University of Wisconsin and the University of Minnesota for summer classes before transferring to North Dakota State University, where she later completed her studies after marrying in 1977. She returned home and worked with the National Youth Service Corps (NYSC), Benin City between 1983 and 1984.

She carried out post-graduate studies at the University of Nigeria from 1989, earning a Ph.D. in human nutrition in 1991. While lecturing at the University of Benin, she enrolled as a student there and earned a postgraduate diploma in education (PGDE) in 2001.

She took a post-doctorate degree at Vaal University of Technology, Vanderbijlpark in South Africa in 2005.

== Career ==
Salami began her career with the University of Benin as a senior lecturer in 1994. Prior to her appointment with this institution, she had briefly taught at the then University of Ife, now Obafemi Awolowo University having completed her national youth service with the NYSC, Benin City in 1984. Subsequently, she lectured at the University of Maiduguri from 1985 to 1994.

She was head of department from 1996 to 1998 at the University of Benin and attained the status of a professor in 2005. Held administrative positions such as chairman of the board of University of Benin Integrated Enterprise, director of general studies, director of part-time programme, director-general/chief executive, National Institute for Educational Planning and Administration (NIEPA), Ondo State. Salami supervised over 15 Ph.D. and 40 master's degree students.

Salami has published articles in national and international journals, and has taught several courses within the scope of Home Economics and Nutrition.
