= Loretta Ogboro-Okor =

Nigerian medical doctor

- Oduware
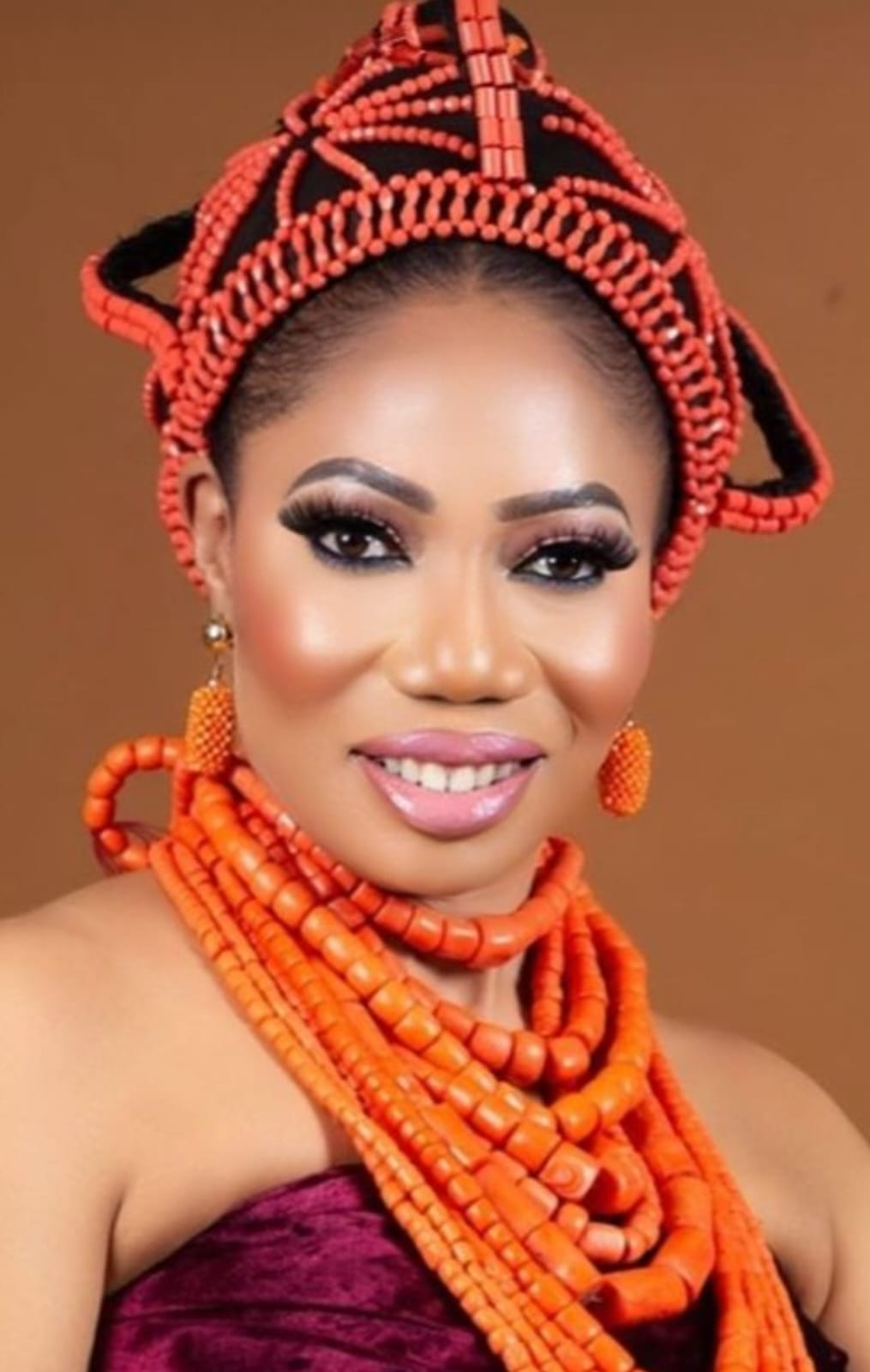
- Born: 18 August 1977 (age 49); Benin City
- Education: University of Benin, University of Edinburgh
- Occupations: Consultant obstetrician and gynaecologist
- Known for: Advocacy, writing
- Spouse: Douglas Okor
- Awards: Accenture positive role model West Africa award in the management, consulting and legal services sector

Loretta Oduware Ogboro-Okor is a Nigerian UK-trained consultant in Obstetrics and gynaecology. She is a medical simulator expert and global goodwill ambassador. She is the president of the University of Benin Alumni Association, UK and also an author, women and youth health advocate, educationist and medical simulation trainer.

A former governorship aspirant in Edo State, she is currently the Director General Edo State Diaspora Agency .

== Early life and education ==
Loretta Ogboro-Okor was born in Benin City, Edo state to Prince Richard Osarogiuwa Ogboro and Rose Ogboro née Uwadia on 28 August 1977. She completed her primary education at Lydia primary school and gained admission on to the Federal Government Girls College, Benin City.

Ogboro-Okor studied medicine at the University of Benin, College of medical science and graduated in 2003 with MBBS.

Ogboro-Okor contributed to discussions by Edo state government on controlling the spread of COVID-19 in the state. She holds a masters in Public health research from the University of Edinburgh and another in clinical education from Sheffield Hallam University. She has a Ph.D. in law and criminology in view from Sheffield Hallam University.

== Career ==
Ogboro-Okor is a consultant obstetrician and gynaecologist in the UK. She has contributed to the Journal of medical and Basic Scientific Research where she is a member of the editorial board. A member of the Royal college of obstetricians and gynaecologists in the UK, she is a consultant obstetrician and gynaecologist with the Rotherham NHS Foundation Trust as well as an obstetrics skills and drills lead with the Doncaster and Bassettlaw teaching hospital foundation Trust.

As an author she has published an autobiography, My Father's Daughter and Heartwebs. She is also part of a team working to stop illegal migration and trafficking from Nigeria.

== Personal life ==
Ogboro-Okor is married to Douglas Okor, a neurosurgeon. She has a blog Loretta Reveals, where she writes on issues like politics, gender inclusion and social reform. She is the leader for the health care policy group in the Obi-Datti presidential campaign and was a panelist at the Big Tent Coalition telethon televised on Nigerian television to raise funds for the labor party presidential candidate, Peter Obi.

In 2021, she was appointed into the Diaspora agency committee by Godwin Obaseki of Edo state. She is the co-founder of the Ashanti Graham health and education foundation which builds capacity of health care professionals and gives prizes to graduating students in the medical field who excel.

Ogboro-Okor was part of the Midwestern professionals led by Don Pedro Obaseki who were calling for restructuring in Nigeria as a group.

== Awards ==
Ogboro-Okor won the Accenture 10th Gender mainstreaming awards as positive role model West Africa award in the management, consulting and legal services sector.
