= Christopher Okaeben =

Nigerian politician

Member of the Edo State House of Assembly
- In office 2015–2023
- Constituency: Oredo West Constituency

Commissioner for Youths and Sports, Edo State
- In office 2014–2015

Executive Director, Petroleum Monitoring Committee, Edo State
- In office 2012–2013

Secretary to the Council, Oredo Local Government
- In office 2010–2012

Senior Special Assistant (Youth Employment), Edo State Government
- In office 2009–2010

Supervisory Councillor (Works & Transport), Oredo Local Government
- In office 2007–2008

Personal details
- Born: 25 December 1972 (age 53) Edo State, Nigeria
- Party: All Progressives Congress
- Spouse: Princess Cynthia Musa Okaeben
- Children: 4
- Education: University of Benin (B.Sc., M.Sc.)
- Alma mater: University of Benin
- Occupation: Politician, public servant, businessman

Christopher Okaeben (born December 25, 1972) is a Nigerian politician, legislator, public servant, and businessman. He is a member of the All Progressives Congress (APC) and has held several administrative and legislative roles in Edo State. Okaeben is known for his contributions to public service, youth development, and community welfare.

== Early life and education ==
Christopher Okaeben was born on December 25, 1972, in Edo State, Nigeria. He attended the University of Benin Staff School for his primary education and Adolor College, Benin City, for secondary education. He earned a Bachelor’s degree in Banking and Finance in 2006 and a Master’s degree in the same field in 2012, both from the University of Benin.

== Political career ==
Christopher Okaeben began his public service career as Supervisory Councillor for Works and Transport in Oredo Local Government Area from 2007 to 2008. He later served as:

- Senior Special Assistant (Youth Employment), Edo State Government from 2009 to 2010.
- Secretary to the Council, Oredo Local Government from 2010 to 2012.
- Executive Director, Petroleum Monitoring Committee, Edo State from 2012 to 2013.

In 2014, Okaeben was appointed Commissioner for Youths and Sports in Edo State under Governor Adams Oshiomhole. During his tenure (2014–2015), he implemented initiatives aimed at revitalizing sports, including supporting Bendel Insurance Football Club and Edo Queens FC.

=== Legislative career ===
Okaeben was elected to the Edo State House of Assembly in 2015, representing the Oredo West Constituency. He was re-elected in 2019, serving two terms in office from 2015 to 2023. During his tenure, he chaired several key committees, including Health and Women’s Affairs, and Energy and Water Resources, focusing on improving public utilities, healthcare, and education in Edo State.

=== Federal College Board Membership Appointment By President Tinubu ===
In 2024, Okaeben was appointed as a board member of the Federal College of Education (Technical), Benin City, Edo State, by President Bola Ahmed Tinubu.

== Personal life ==
Christopher Okaeben is married to Princess Cynthia Musa Okaeben, and they have four children: Monkey, Sharon, Chris Junior, and Nicole.

== Business Ventures ==
Christopher Okaeben is the Executive Director of Christian Integrated Services Nigeria Ltd, an oil service provider that offers specialized services to the oil and gas industry, supporting operations across all stages of oil extraction, from exploration and drilling to production and maintenance, by providing technical expertise, equipment, and manpower to optimize efficiency and productivity in oil extraction activities.
