= Emmanuel Agwoje =

Nigerian banker and businessperson

Emmanuel Osa Agwoje
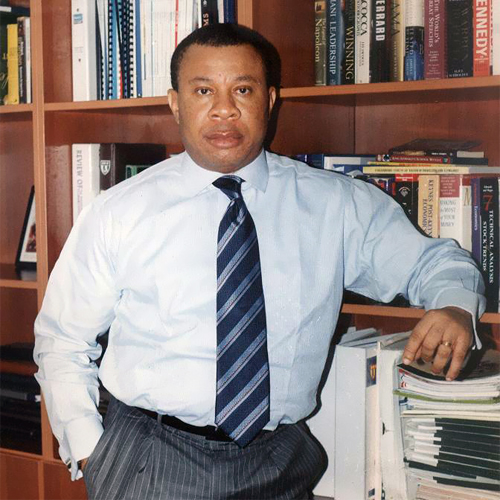
- Lagos, Nigeria (May 2010)
- Born: 7 April 1962 (age 63)
- Website: www.emmanuelagwoje.com

Emmanuel Osa Agwoje (born 7 April 1962) is a Nigerian banker and businessperson. He is currently the chief executive officer of Equator Capital Ltd, a financial services company.

== Early life ==
Agwoje studied at Lagos City College between 1973 and 1978 where he graduated with division one in the West African School Certificate (WASC) and also received a 3rd place award at a National Essay Competition. He also held the position of Prefect in charge of the laboratory. He was in the Basic Section from form one to five and was a member School House. He proceeded to the University of Port Harcourt, where he earned a second class upper division degree in economics between 1979 and 1983. While at the university, he was a UACN scholar and for three years, remained on the Dean's list for Outstanding Performance in social sciences.

In 1982, he became the president of the University's chapter of Nigerian Economics Students Association. At the University of Benin, he earned a M.SC in economics Class 1986 as the best graduating student, his area of emphasis being money and banking.

== Professional career ==
He worked for 16 years at Allstates Trust Bank Plc. He became an Executive Director and deputy chief executive officer of the bank overseeing investment banking activities.

He is the chief executive officer of Equator Capital Limited, a financial services company.
