= Chike Onuorah =

Nigerian artist and painter

Chike Onuorah (born 1967) also known as D’Artist is a Nigerian contemporary artist and painter. His work focuses on different themes and gives special attention to painting female figures depicting their value and socio-economic contributions to society. He uses self-introduced methods he calls charcoal on canvas and cracking the canvas he describes as Crackillino, Splashillino, Plastillino and Grassillino. He holds annual solo exhibition in Nigeria and in foreign countries and his works are on display in several galleries including Ovico Gallery in St. Augustine County, Florida, United States showcasing mainly his works. Onuorah is a member of several societies of artists including Society of Nigerian Artists (SNA) and Atlanta Society of Artists in the US.

== Education and career ==
Chike Onuorah was born in 1967 during the Nigerian Civil War. He attended Federal Government College, Port Harcourt and studied fine art at the University of Benin graduating in 1988. A full-time studio artist, Onuorah uses oil and acrylic and he is the proponent of new methods, charcoal on canvas and cracking the canvas he termed crackillino, splashillino, plastillino and grassillino. Though his works focus on different themes, he accords women special attention in his painting depicting them as valuable, hardworking and dependable. His solo exhibitions are titled in inspiring terms such Commitment, Passion and Timeless. In his 2010 solo exhibition at Terra Kulture, Lagos, themed Commitment, Onuroah presented painting of a woman with three hands carrying a baby. Onuorah posits that a woman needs commitment and three hands to train a child; one to love, another to nurture and the third hand which is to discipline is the longest of the three hands explaining that discipline is important in raising a child.

His works are often displayed with accompanying poems explaining poetically, the messages depicted by the painting. He has exhibited his works in several countries including Senegal, Germany, Jamaica, United Kingdom and United States. His works dominate Ovico Gallery in St. Augustine, Florida, United States. The gallery opened to showcase African art works to the west. Chike is a member of Nigeria Society of artists, Atlanta Society of Artists, and St. Augustine Arts Association.
