= Imade Osawaru =

Nigerian actress and filmmaker

- Born: Edo State, Nigeria
- Education: University of Benin
- Occupations: Actress; film producer
- Years active: 2016–present

Imade Osawaru is a Nigerian actress, filmmaker and producer. She is the host of Imade's Kitchen, a television cooking programme. In 2022, she was named Emerging Young CEO of the Year at the Top 50 Most Industrious Women in Africa. She serves as secretary of the Actors Guild of Nigeria (AGN), Lagos State Chapter.

== Early life and education ==
Osawaru is a native of Ugha Okhuoihe, Uhunmwond LGA, Edo State, Nigeria. She was raised in Benin City, Edo State, Nigeria. She attended the University of Benin, where she obtained a degree in public administration. She later attended Istituto di Istruzione Superiore Einstein Nebbia, where she obtained a diploma in cooking.

== Career ==
Osawaru began her career as an actress in 2016 and has appeared in several films, including A Call from the Past, Last Affair, King of Kings, The Gateman and Exhausted.

She is the founder of MadeMonic Entertainment Productions, a content creation and film production company and has produced various films such as Fatal Attraction, The Older the Wine, The Herbs of Life, Indecisiveness and the web series, The General.

Osawaru also appears as the host of Imade's Kitchen, a television cooking programme. She serves as secretary of the Actors Guild of Nigeria (AGN), Lagos State Chapter.

== Filmography ==
- My Village Bride
- Exhausted
- Fatal Attraction
- The Gateman
- King of Kings
- Last Affair
- Sweet Mama's House
- A Fool for Trust
- Herbs of Life
- Brothers & Thrones
- V8
- A Call from the Past
- Romantic Attraction
- The General
- Thirty and Still Single
- Izoduwa
- The Older the Wine

== Awards and recognition ==
Osawaru has received the following awards:

- Fast Rising Actor (Female) at The Intellects Awards (2019)
- Emerging Young CEO of the Year at the Top 50 Most Industrious Women in Africa (2022)
- Fast Rising Actress of the Year at the Nigerian Youth Achievers Awards (2023)
- Most Creative Actress of the Year by Creekvibes Magazine (2025)
- African Fast Growing Entrepreneur of the Year at the African Icon Awards (2025)
- 100 African Female Change Makers at the African Women Achievers Awards (2025)
- Young Entrepreneurial Icon of the Year at the Top 50 Most Industrious Women in Africa (2025)
