= T. M. Yesufu =

Tijani M. Yesufu was a Nigerian academic and administrator who was the first Nigerian Vice-Chancellor of the University of Benin. Yesufu was an important figure in the development of industrial relations as an academic course in Nigerian universities.

He was also an executive director of the Lagos Chamber of Commerce and Industry.

== Life ==
Yesufu was born in 1926 in Agbede, Edo State. He completed secondary education studies at Government College, Ibadan and earned an economics degree from University of Exeter and doctorate degree in Applied Economics from the London School of Economics, a college of the University of London.

Yesufu served in the United Nations agency the International Labour Organization in the Far East, Switzerland and Kenya, until 1973.

Yesufu's academic career began at University of Ibadan's Extra Mural Studies department, he then moved to Lagos as a pioneer staff of the Faculty of Social Science, University of Lagos, he joined University of Benin in 1974 as its first Nigerian Vice-Chancellor.

Yesufu was involved in various organizations and economic policy issues of the time. His 1962 book, An Introduction to Industrial relations In Nigeria was a pioneering work on the changes between the employee-employer relationship from the late colonial period to the early independence era. In 1971, he was editor of the book Manpower Problems and Economic Development in Nigeria.

Yesufu died in October 2014 in Benin City, Nigeria.
