= Adamu Baikie =

Nigerian academic and vice-chancellor (1931–2025)

- Born: 2 October 1931; Wusasa, Northern Region, Colony and Protectorate of Nigeria
- Died: 12 December 2025 (aged 94); Zaria, Kaduna State, Nigeria
- Known for: First Professor of Education from Northern Nigeria; Pioneer Vice-Chancellor of Nasarawa State University

Academic background
- Education: University of London; University of Wisconsin–Madison

Adamu Baikie (2 October 1931 – 12 December 2025) was a Nigerian educationist and university administrator. He was recognised as the first professor of education from Northern Nigeria and served as vice-chancellor of the University of Benin (1978–1986), the National University of Lesotho (1988–1996), and as pioneer vice-chancellor of Nasarawa State University, Keffi.

== Early life and education ==
Adamu Baikie was born on 2 October 1931 in Wusasa, Northern Region (now Kaduna State, Nigeria). His father worked for the Nigerian Railway Corporation. He attended schools in Kano, Lokoja, and Wusasa.

Baikie earned a diploma from the Nigerian College of Arts, Science and Technology, a BSc (Hons) in Education from the University of London in 1964, and a PhD in Education from the University of Wisconsin, United States, in 1968.

== Academic career ==
Baikie joined Ahmadu Bello University (ABU), Zaria, as an assistant lecturer in 1964, advancing to lecturer, dean of the Faculty of Education (1971–1974), and professor of education in 1971, becoming the first from Northern Nigeria in that field.

== Administrative positions ==
Baikie was the vice chancellor of University of Benin between 1978 and 1986. He served as the vice chancellor of National University of Lesotho between 1988 and 1996. He also served as the first vice chancellor of Nasarawa State University, Keffi between 2001 and 2005.

== Death ==
Baikie died on 12 December 2025, at the age of 94.

== Publications ==
- Baikie, Adamu (2021). Sabongari. ISBN 978-978-57841-5-2.
