= Andrew Onokheroraye =

Andrew Onokheroraye is a social and environmental scientist from Nigeria. He is a former Vice-Chancellor of the University of Benin (UNIBEN), serving from 1992 to 1998. He holds a PhD from the London School of Economics and Political Science.

He is also the founder and former Executive Director of the Centre for Population and Environmental Development (CPED), an organization focused on action research and community development in Nigeria. He is known for his work in development geography and for his publications, including a memoir titled "On the Hot Seat: The Memoir of a Vice-Chancellor."

In 2014, there was a public dispute with the University of Benin when the university's Senate attempted to strip him of his Professor Emeritus status, alleging he was not fulfilling his responsibilities. Onokheroraye refuted the claims, stating his appointment letter did not require routine responsibilities and he had voluntarily contributed to the university when invited.

In late 2024, he was conferred with an honorary Doctor of Science degree by Western Delta University, where he also served as the first pro-chancellor.
