= Abhulimen Richard Anao =

Abhulimen Richard Anao is a Nigerian academic and professor of accounting, who served as Vice-Chancellor of the University of Benin from 1999 to 2004.

== Career ==
Anao has had a long career in academia, particularly in the fields of accounting and finance. He is a Fellow of the Institute of Chartered Accountants of Nigeria (ICAN).

Anao was a key figure at the University of Benin. He served as the Vice-Chancellor from 1999 to 2004, and was also founding head of the Department of Accounting.

In addition to his academic and administrative positions, he has been involved in other public duties, such as serving as the Returning Officer for the 2011 governorship election in Delta State.
