= Kwate =

Nigerian singer

David Cross Idukomose
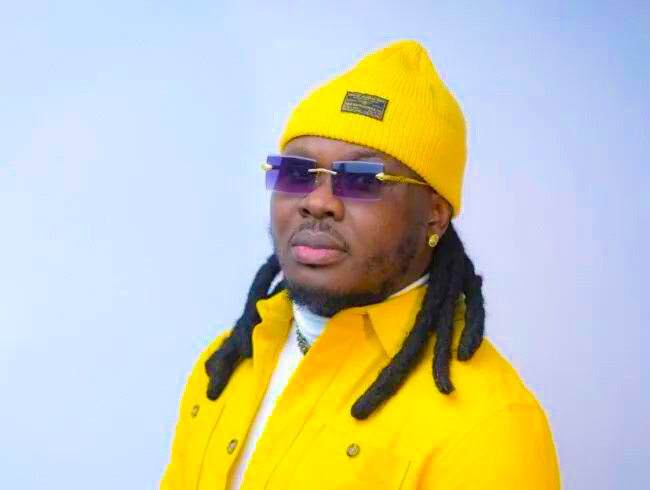

Background information
- Born: David Cross Idukomose; 2 August; Lagos State, Nigeria
- Origin: Edo State, Nigeria
- Genres: Afrobeats, Hip-hop, Pop music
- Occupations: Singer, songwriter, IT professional, entrepreneur
- Years active: 2007–present

David Cross Idukomose (born 2 August), known professionally as Kwate, is a Nigerian hip-hop artist and Afrobeats musician. His 2025 single “Usain Bolt” reached number 1 on Top 200 Nigerian Shazam chart. In September 2026, Kwate won Best African USA-Based Artiste of the Year at the 2026 AFRIMMA Awards, the same year he collaborated with Snoop Dogg.

Kwate is recognized for his singles and musical style, which blends traditional and modern elements. Kwate emphasizes consistency, innovation, and cultural resonance in his music.

== Early life and education ==
David Cross Idukomose was born on 2 August in Lagos State, Nigeria. He spent his early years in Ilorin, Kwara State, and Benin City. He attended Oko Erin Primary School, Immaculate Conception College, Ekiadolor College of Education, and the University of Benin where he studied computer science. Despite his academic pursuits, music remained his primary interest. Inspired by The Remedies and Plantashun Boiz shows in 2003 and 2004, respectively, he decided to pursue music as a career.

Kwate was exposed to various musical genres, from traditional Nigerian sounds to international influences. His parents encouraged his early interest in music. He developed his vocal skills in church choirs and local talent shows.

== Career ==
Kwate's musical journey began in Edo State, and continued after relocating to Lagos, in 1998. His career gained momentum in 2010 with the release of "Party Dey Here," featuring Side One, which received significant airplay across Nigeria. He followed this with "Baby Give Me More," featuring Jaywon in 2011.

In the second half of the 2010s, Kwate released several tracks, including "I Don’t Know," "Love," "OvbokhanMven," "Halla," and "Enjoy Yourself." His single "On Ground," featuring Black IQ, achieved commercial success on digital platforms.

Kwate received nominations for the Mnet Asian Music Awards (MAMA) and African Entertainment Awards Malaysia in 2010/2011. He has performed in over 100 countries, including in Moscow, India, and Botswana, and was the first Nigerian artist to perform at the "Longest Dinner Table in the World."

His 2024 single “Shout out to my Ex” debuted on Apple Music Top 100s in Kenya, Nigeria and Ghana reaching numbers 11, 32, and 80 respectively and gained notable traction across social media platforms including TikTok.The following year, his 2025 single “Usain Bolt” reached number 1 on Top 200 Shazam Nigeria chart.

In the same year, Kwate performed at the Pavilion at Toyota Music Factory in Dallas and at the Toyota Center in Houston respectively at Davido’s 5ive Alive Tour alongside Victony, Odumodublvck, Morravey, Bracket amongst others. He also performed alongside Davido in Atlanta, Georgia last year.

In November 2025, Kwate won Entertainer of the Year at the 2025 GADA Awards in Houston, Texas. Few days later in the same month he won African Creative Impact Leader of the Year at the African Entrepreneurship & Business Awards of 2025. The same month he performed at the Davido last 5ive Alive North American Tour at the State Farm Arena in Atlanta, Georgia.

In July 2026, Kwate launched his United States Tour, the same month he released “Fame & Fortune” featuring American rapper Snoop Dogg.

== Musical style and influences ==
Kwate's music blends traditional Nigerian sounds with contemporary influences, addressing social issues, love, and self-empowerment. His role models include Fela Kuti, Victor Uwaifo, Felix Lebarty, King Sunny Ade, 2Face Idibia, Eedris Abdulkareem, 50 Cent and Beenie Man.

Kwate has collaborated with producers like Sheyman, O’ Black, Fliptyce Beats, Spanky, and Terry G. His music has been featured on playlists such as Spotify's Afrobeat Classics and Apple Music's African A-List.

== Personal life ==
Kwate balances his music career with other activities. He owns a healthcare business and a coffee company.

== Discography ==
=== Selected singles ===
- "Party Dey Here" (2010) featuring Side One
- "Baby Give Me More" (2011) featuring Jaywon
- "On Ground" (2024) featuring Black IQ
- "Fame & Fortune" (2026) featuring Snoop Dogg

== Awards and nominations ==
- Nominated for Mnet Asian Music Awards (MAMA) (2010/2011)
- Nominated for African Entertainment Awards Malaysia (2010/2011)
- Won the 2026 Afrimma Best African USA-Based Artiste of the Year Award (2026)
