= Edoba Omoregie =

Nigerian professor of Constitutional Law

11th Vice-Chancellor of the University of Benin
- Preceded by: Lilian Salami

Personal details
- Born: 5 April 1969 (age 57) Benin City, Edo State, Nigeria
- Party: Non-Partisan
- Education: University of Benin
- Occupation: Lawyer
- Profession: Academic

Edoba Bright Omoregie (born 5 April 1969) is a Nigerian professor of Constitutional Law and Governance, and the 11th substantive Vice Chancellor of University of Benin.

== Early life and background ==
Edoba was born and raised in Benin City, Edo State, Nigeria. He obtained his first degree in law from the University of Benin and proceeded to the Nigerian Law School, Victoria Island, Lagos State. He attended the same school for his second and third degrees, and was called to bar in 1992. In 2021, he was conferred with the rank of Senior Advocate of Nigeria, SAN. Edoba holds a PhD in Comparative Constitutional Law with a specialization in federalism and governance, and has been a lecturer in the Faculty of Law, University of Benin since January 1998. Edoba has held the position of head Department of Private and Property Law, Faculty of Law in the University of Benin, and he was director of the Department of Legislative Support Services in the Nigerian Institute for Democratic and Legislative Studies (NIDLS), a position he held from 2019 to 2024.
