= Helen Asemota =

Biochemist and agricultural biotechnologist

Helen Nosakhare Asemota
- Born: Nigeria
- Education: University of Benin Ahmadu Bello University Frankfurt University
- Scientific career
- Fields: Biochemistry; Molecular Biology; Biotechnology; Agricultural biotechnology; Nanotechnology
- Workplaces: University of the West Indies
- Website: https://www.mona.uwi.edu/bms/staff/asemoto.htm

Helen Nosakhare Asemota is a biochemist and agricultural biotechnologist based in Jamaica. She is Professor of Biochemistry and Molecular Biology and Director of the Biotechnology Centre at the University of the West Indies at Mona, Jamaica. Her research develops biotechnology strategies for production and improvement of tropical tuber crops. She is notable for leading large international biotechnology collaborations, as well as for acting as an international biotechnology consultant for the United Nations (UN).

== Early life and education ==
Asemota was born in Nigeria. She earned a Bachelor of Science from the University of Benin, a Master of Science from Ahmadu Bello University, and a Doctor of Philosophy from the University of Benin/Frankfurt University.

== Career ==
In 1990, Asemota moved to Jamaica to take up a position as Associate Honorary Lecturer at the University of the West Indies. She was appointed Lecturer in 1996, and promoted to Senior Lecturer in Biochemistry and Biotechnology in 1998. In 2003, Asemota was promoted to Professor of Biochemistry and Molecular Biology. She was full professor at the Shaw University, North Carolina from 2005 to 2012. During this time she was Head of the Nanobiology Division of the Shaw Nanotechnology Initiative at the Nanoscience and Nanotechnology Research Centre (NNRC) from 2005 to 2009, Nature Sciences Biological Sciences' Program Coordinator from 2009 to 2010, and Chairman for the Shaw University Institutional Review Board (IRB) from 2006 to 2009, Senator for the Shaw Faculty Senate between 2007 and 2012, Core Director of the Faculty Research Development at the NIH- Research Infrastructure for Minority Institutions and as IRB Administrator between 2010 and 2012.

In 2013, Asemota was appointed Director of the Biotechnology Centre, a research unit at the University of the West Indies with a focus on biotechnology-based enterprises.

At the time of her promotion to Professor in 2003, Asemota was a member of the Caribbean Biotechnology Network, the Biochemical Society of Nigeria, the Third World Organisation for Women in Science, and the Nigerian Association of Women in Science, Technology & Mathematics. She was a Fellow of the American Biographical Institute, a member of the National Geographic Society, the Nigerian Institute of Food Science and Technology, and the New York Academy of Science.

=== Research ===
Asemota conducted PhD research at the University of Benin and Frankfurt University, where she studied the molecular genetics and metabolism of the browning of yam tubers in storage.

Upon moving to Jamaica, prompted by ongoing problems with production and storage in the Jamaican yam industry, Asemota continued researching yams, founding the multidisciplinary UWI Yam Biotechnology Project. Initially, Asemota investigated the biochemical effects of removing yam heads at harvest, a common farming practice in Jamaica. Over the ensuing decades, Asemota's research team has investigated many aspects of yam biochemistry and physiology, from DNA fingerprinting studies of Jamaican yam varieties to the carbohydrate metabolism of yam tubers in storage.

In addition to her work on yam production and storage, Asemota has studied the metabolic effects of yams and yam-derived products on animal models of diseases such as diabetes. More recently, the Yam Biotechnology Project has moved towards a 'farm to finished products' strategy, with the goal of producing yam-based food, medical, and biofuel products to benefit the Jamaican economy. She has also applied similar research techniques to other types of tropical crop.

Asemota has served as Principal Investigator for the National Institute of Health (NIH) and National Science Foundation (NSF) grants. She has lectured undergraduates, postgraduates and postdoctoral levels worldwide, and has supervised or advised at least 30 postgraduate students in Biochemistry or Biotechnology. She has over 250 publications, and owns four patents from her research.

=== Outreach activities ===
Asemota has undertaken outreach research with Jamaican farmers, experimenting with lab-derived yam planting materials in their fields, and reviving 'threatened' Jamaican yam varieties.

=== International consultancy ===
Asemota has a long history of international consultancy in matters of food security and biotechnology. She was an international technical expert for the European Union (1994-1995), and served the United Nations Technical Cooperation among Developing Countries (TCDC) Programmes as International Technical Cooperation Programmes (TCP). She served as an International Biotechnology consultant to the United Nations Food and Agriculture Organisation from 2001. This included consulting for the International Technical Cooperation for Syria with the Developing Countries Programmes in 2001 and as technical lead on food sufficiency for the National Seed Potato Production Programme in the Republic of Tajikistan between 2003 and 2007. She periodically serves the UN-FAO Seed Production Programmes as an International Consultant.

== See also ==
- M. H. Ahmad
