= Gideon Obhakhan =

Nigerian politician

Gideon Obhakhan is a Nigerian politician and the immediate past commissioner for education in Edo State. He contested for the House of Representatives during the 2015 general election.

== Early life and education ==
Gideon Obhakhan was born in Ekpoma, Edo State, Nigeria. He attended Emaudo Primary School, Ekpoma, before proceeding to Annunciation Catholic College, Irrua for his secondary education thereafter proceeded to the University of Benin where he obtained bachelor's degree in Electronic and electrical Engineering. He bagged his masters in communication engineering from the University of Lagos before proceeding to University of Leicester, United Kingdom for an MBA.

== Career and politics ==
Obhakhan worked with private telecommunications companies such as Mobitel and EMIS telecommunication before joining MTN Nigeria as managing director, Planning and Strategy.

Obhakhan contested for the House of Representatives election in the 2015 general election under the umbrella of All Progressive Congress (APC). He lost to the opposition party's candidate, Joe Edionwele of the Peoples Democratic Party(PDP). He was appointed as the commissioner for education by the then Governor of Edo State, Adams Oshiomhole. During the 2020 gubernatorial elections in Edo State, the candidate of the All Progressives Congress, Osagie Ize-Iyamu, appointed him as director of Research, Ize-Iyamu Campaign Organisation.

Obhakhan served as the secretary of the Public Affairs Directorate of the Tinubu/Shettima Presidential Campaign Council during the campaigning for the 2023 Nigerian presidential election.

== Personal life ==
Obhakhan is a Christian and is married.
