= ProvidusUnity Bank Limited =

Nigerian commercial bank

Coordinates: 06°25′53″N 03°25′50″E

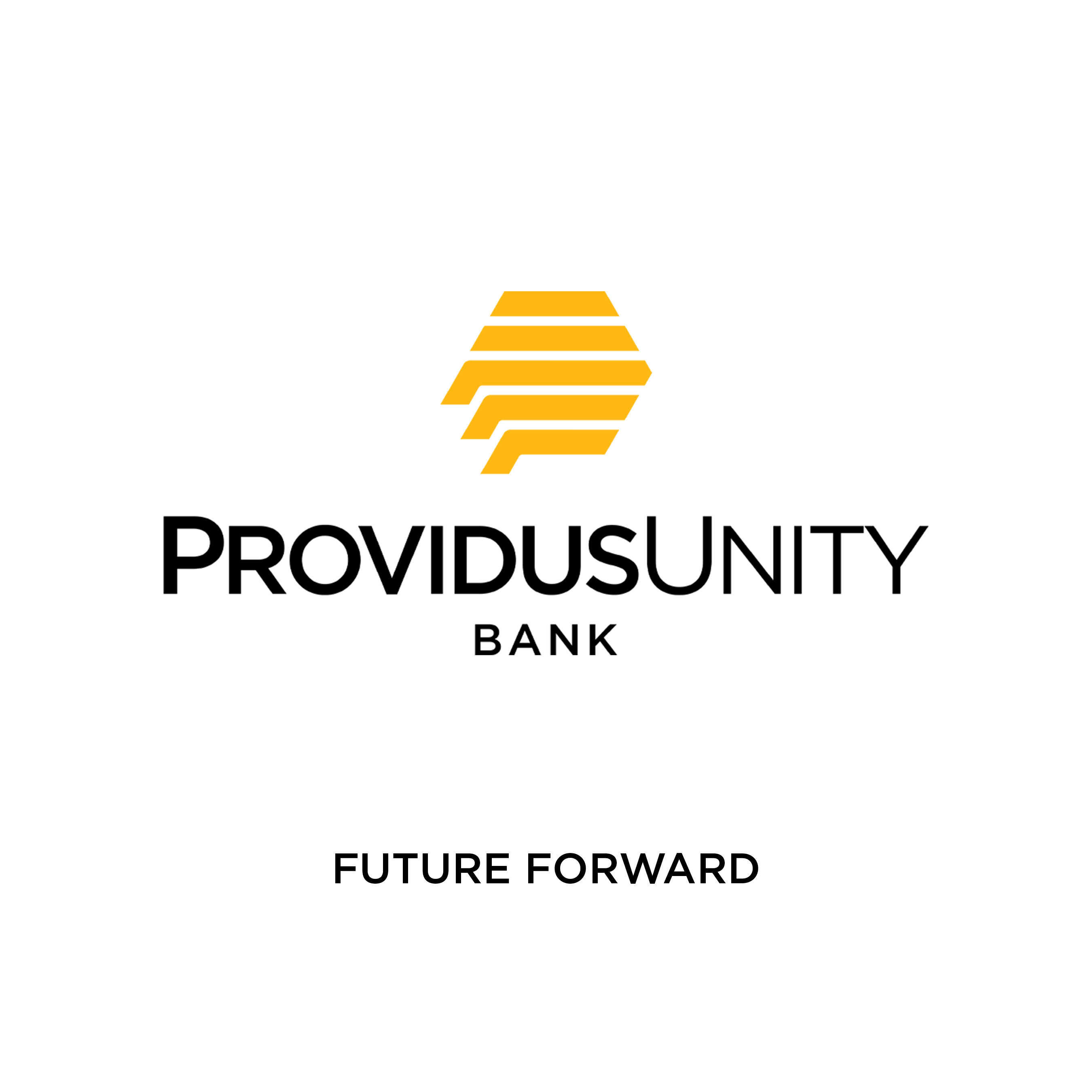
- Type: Private company
- Industry: Finance
- Genre: Banking
- Founded: 1 June 2026; 3 months ago
- Headquarters: Lagos, 724 Adetokunbo Ademola Street, Victoria Island, Nigeria
- Area served: Nigeria
- Key people: Alhaji Hussaini Dikko; Chairman; Walter Akpani; Managing Director and Chief Executive Officer
- Products: Commercial banking, Corporate banking, Private banking, SME banking
- Number of employees: 4,000+
- Website: providusunitybank.com

ProvidusUnity Bank Limited, is a Nigerian financial services provider, licensed as a commercial bank, by the Central Bank of Nigeria, the central bank and national banking regulator. The Bank is the offspring of a merger and business combination between Providus Bank Limited and Unity Bank Plc following a regulatory clearance from the Central Bank of Nigeria and other regulatory authorities, and a final sanction by the supreme court of Nigeria in June 2026.

The transaction is one Nigeria's most notable banking consolidations since the 2005 banking reforms, following a recapitalisation exercise by the Central Bank of Nigeria, which ended in March 2026. The business combination brought together the core strengths of Providus Bank in digital banking and Unity Bank's wide branch network, producing a commercial banking franchise with approximately 230 branches across Nigeria and an asset base of over 5.3 trillion Naira, making ProvidusUnity Bank Nigeria's ninth largest bank by asset size and seventh largest by branch network.

With the national franchise licence, ProvidusUnity Bank now has a combined institutional presence across retail, commercial, corporate, private and digital banking across Nigeria, with an increased capacity to serve all customer segments.

== History ==
ProvidusUnity Bank Limited originated from the merger of Providus Bank Limited and Unity Bank Plc in June 2026.

Providus Bank Limited was incorporated on June 15, 2016, and granted a regional banking license by the Central Bank of Nigeria, while Unity Bank Plc was established on January 1, 2006, through the consolidation of nine banks on the back of the banking sector consolidation of 2005, operating under a national banking licence with an extensive branch network across the country.

The merger first received approval from the Central Bank of Nigeria in 2024, with a stipulation that the newly formed entity will receive a N700 billion loan from the CBN to support its operations. The loan will be used to pay off Unity Bank's N303.7 billion obligations, while the remaining N392.3 billion would be invested in a 20-year FGN bond and would qualify as tier-2 capital for the entity. Unity Bank's CRR shortfall amounting to 117.90 billion Naira was also waived, allowing Providus Bank CRR balance to serve as the opening balance for the new bank.

Under the scheme of the merger, all assets and liabilities of the two banks were combined, while the shareholders of Unity Bank Plc, were given the options to either receive a cash consideration of N3.18 for every share held or a share of 18 ordinary shares valued at N0.50 each in the enlarged bank for every 17 Unity Bank shares held. Unity Bank shares were subsequently delisted from the Nigerian Exchange Group upon conclusion of the process.

== Leadership ==
Alhaji Hussaini Dikko is the chairman, while Sir. Walter Akpani is the Managing Director/Chief Executive Officer of ProvidusUnity Bank Limited. The Deputy Managing Director is Kingsley Agbokhaevbo, while Deoye Ojuroye is the Executive Director/Chief Financial Officer. Other members of the Board of Directors include Chuka Eseka, Maurice Onokwai, Bernadine Okeke, Funmi Agusto, Dr. Bellinda Bobby Diei, and Mahmud B Tukur, who serve as non-executive directors.

== See also ==
- List of banks in Nigeria
