= Elizabeth Ebosele =

Nigerian politician and commissioner

Commissioner for Budget and Economic Planning of Edo State
- Incumbent
- Assumed office 14 October 2025
- Governor: Monday Okpebholo

Personal details
- Born: Elizabeth Onome Ebosele
- Education: University of Benin; University of Cambridge; University of Oxford
- Occupation: Public administrator

Elizabeth Onome Ebosele is a Nigerian public administrator who has served as the Commissioner for Budget and Economic Planning in Edo State since October 2025.

== Early life and education ==
Ebosele comes from the Atuagbo community in the Esan Central Local Government Area of Edo State. She holds a Bachelor of Science degree in business administration from the University of Benin. She later earned a Master of Business Administration from the University of Cambridge and completed executive coursework at the University of Oxford.

== Career ==
Ebosele worked as a technical adviser on budget and national planning in the Federal Ministry of Finance, Budget and National Planning. During the formulation of Nigeria's Medium-Term National Development Plan (2021–2025), she served on the technical working group focused on employment, gender, and special needs.

In April 2022, she sought the nomination of the All Progressives Congress (APC) for the Esan Central/Esan West/Igueben Federal Constituency seat in the House of Representatives. During the 2024 Edo State gubernatorial campaign, she directed the professional group within the APC campaign council.

Governor Monday Okpebholo nominated Ebosele for a cabinet post in September 2025. The Edo State House of Assembly screened and confirmed her nomination on 1 October 2025. She was sworn in on 14 October 2025 and assumed leadership of the Ministry of Budget and Economic Planning following a restructuring of state ministries.
