= Cairo Godson Ojougboh =

Nigerian politician

Federal Representative
- In office 2003–2007
- Constituency: Ika

Personal details
- Born: September 8, 1959
- Died: February 7, 2024 (aged 64)
- Education: Auchi Polytechnic, University of Benin
- Occupation: Politician, Doctor

Cairo Godson Ojougboh (September 8, 1959 – February 7, 2024) was a Nigerian politician and medical doctor. He represented the Ika Federal Constituency of Delta State in the National Assembly.

== Early life and education ==
Ojougboh was born to Chief Corlenso Ojougboh and Mrs. Angelina Ojougboh in Ika South, Delta State. He completed his early education at Pilgrims Baptist Primary School and graduated from St. Columba’s Grammar School in 1976. He then attended Auchi Polytechnic before earning a Bachelor of Medicine, Bachelor of Surgery (MBBS) degree from the University of Benin in 1985.

== Political career ==
Ojougboh's political career began with his role as chairman of the Alliance for Democracy (AD) from 1998 to 1999. He later represented Ika Federal Constituency of Delta State in the House of Representatives from 2003 to 2007. From 2007 to 2011, he served as presidential liaison officer to the president on the National Assembly and as special assistant to the president on National Assembly matters. From 2013 to 2015, he was chairman of the Nigeria Export Processing Zones Authority (NEPZA).

As a member of the People's Democratic Party (PDP), he held various positions within the party, including national vice chairman and chairman of the South South region from 2014 to 2016, and deputy national chairman from 2016 to 2017. He also served as political adviser to Chief Edwin Kiagbodo Clark and as executive secretary of the National Unity Group (NUG).

In 2019, Ojougboh ran for governor of Delta State under the All Progressives Congress (APC).

== Death ==
Ojougboh died on February 7, 2024, at the age of 64 after suffering a heart attack during the Africa Cup of Nations (AFCON) semi-final match between Nigeria and South Africa.
