= Ken Hill (Australian footballer) =

Australian rules footballer

Personal information
- Born: 4 April 1950 (age 76)
- Height: 175 cm (5 ft 9 in)
- Weight: 77 kg (170 lb)

Playing career^{1}
Years	Club	Games (Goals)
1967	North Melbourne	2 (0)
- ^{1} Playing statistics correct to the end of 1967.

Ken Hill (born 4 April 1950) is a former Australian rules footballer who played with North Melbourne in the Victorian Football League (VFL).
