= MSE (centrifuges) =

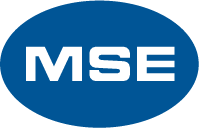
- Company type: Manufacturer
- Industry: Laboratory equipment
- Founded: April 7, 1936
- Headquarters: Nuaillé, France
- Key people: Yifei WANG
- Products: Laboratory Centrifuges
- Revenue: Unknown
- Website: http://www.mse-sas.com

MSE (short for Medical and Scientific Equipment) is a French company which produces laboratory equipment such as centrifuges.

== History ==
MSE was founded in 1936 by Ernest Foulkes, initially as a manufacturer and distributor of machine tools and equipment. Throughout World War II, MSE was appointed by the UK ministry of supply to act as lease lend agents for American machine tools in order to support the war effort. In the 1930s and early 1940s, the name stood for Machine Shop Equipment.

With the founding of the National Health Service following the culmination of the second world war, MSE was retained by them to develop hospital Microtomes, which until then had not been manufactured in the UK. In the early 1950s, the newly formed Atomic Energy Authority approached MSE requesting them to manufacture a range of centrifuges for use in their research. Following the change of focus from machine tool manufacture to centrifuges, the acronym MSE was changed to Measuring and Scientific Equipment.

== The 1960s, 1970s and 1980s ==
MSE moved to larger premises in Crawley, during the early 1960s and was well established by 1968. Following Foulke's retirement in 1972, MSE was acquired by Fisons and became linked with Kontron soon after. Kontron AG, at the time, were heavily involved in the production and design of ultra centrifuge systems, which MSE used to support their ultra centrifuges.

Production and development continued through the 1980s following the relocation of the entire manufacturing side to Uxbridge in 1983.

== The 1990s ==
In 1990, Fisons Scientific Equipment restructured and sold its manufacturing wing to Sanyo, where it was assimilated into the Gallenkamp brand, and marketed as Sanyo Gallenkamp PLC.

Throughout the 1990s, Sanyo Gallenkamp produced a range of laboratory centrifuges, although was also known for the production of incubators (CO_{2}, orbital and cooled), fridges, freezers, blood banks, ovens and water stills. Production moved to Loughborough in 1998, where the UK office for Sanyo Gallenkamp currently lies.

== Present day ==
In 2003, Sanyo Gallenkamp sold the manufacturing wing of MSE to Henderson Biomedical Ltd, a centrifuge servicing company, and manufacturing moved to Lower Sydenham in south London. Today, the company retains the same logo it used when it was first established in 1936.

In 2018 MSE was purchased by Labtech International Limited, a supplier and service provider for scientific equipment, accessories and consumables based in Heathfield, East Sussex.

In 2019, the decision was taken to move the company to France to remain competitive in the centrifuge industry. This decision was deemed necessary, due to the uncertain economic climate caused by Brexit. Operating out of France, MSE's mission to be at the forefront of innovation in the centrifuge industry and remain leaders in the field remains unchanged.
