= Mars Surface Exploration =

Engineering design tool

Mars Surface Exploration (MSE) is a systems engineering tool for the design of rover missions originally developed in 2003 by the Space Systems Engineering graduate class at MIT. It has since been further enhanced by the MIT Space Systems Laboratory with the support of the Jet Propulsion Laboratory (JPL). The tool is intended to help designers during pre-phase A rover mission design. MSE enables designers to model and analyze very rapidly a wide range of design options for a mission whose science goals have been defined. The emphasis is on breadth rather than on in-depth modeling of specific designs. Other rover modeling tools exist at NASA’s and ESA’s concurrent engineering facilities that take the approach of interconnecting sophisticated software design environments to conduct detailed analyses of a particular mission. MSE's approach complements in-depth modeling techniques which, in return, assist in the validation of MSE's models at various points of the design space.

== Analyses ==
MSE has been used to analyze various types of missions ranging from traditional rover missions (e.g. Mars Science Laboratory and ExoMars) to Mars Sample Return-type missions and lunar missions.

== See also ==
- Exploration of Mars
- Sojourner
- Mars Exploration Rovers
- Mars Science Laboratory
- ExoMars
