= Emmanuel Nwanze =

Nigerian biochemist (born 1949)

Emmanuel Andrew Chukwuedo Nwanze is a Nigerian biochemist and university administrator who served as the Vice-Chancellor of the University of Benin from 2004 to 2009, later receiving the title of Emeritus Professor at the institution in 2019.

== Early life and education ==
Nwanze was born on 15 January 1949 in Uromi, present-day Edo State, with family origins in Asaba, Delta State. He attended Council School, Sapele (1960–1961) and Loyola College, Ibadan (1962–1966). He studied Chemistry at the University of Ibadan between 1968 and 1972 as a government scholar, and proceeded on another government scholarship to the University of Warwick, United Kingdom, where he earned a Ph.D. in Molecular Science in 1976.

== Academic career ==
Nwanze joined the University of Benin in 1976 as Lecturer II in Biochemistry, was promoted to Lecturer I in 1978, Senior Lecturer in 1981, and Professor of Biochemistry in 1987. He taught biochemistry and membrane biophysics to undergraduate students in science, medicine, dentistry, and pharmacy, and at the postgraduate level taught biochemical methodology and clinical biochemistry. He served twice as Head of the Department of Biochemistry (1987–1989; 1991–1994) and twice as Dean of the Faculty of Science (1994–1996; 1996–1998). His international engagements included visiting professorships at the Karolinska Institute, Stockholm (1985–1986), and the University of Milan (1990–1991), as well as fellowships and seminars with Yale University (1974), Swedish International Seminars in Physics and Chemistry (1985), and the Third World Academy of Science in Trieste (1990).

His research covered lipid biochemistry, enzymology, toxicology, and environmental biochemistry, including studies on lipoxygenase assays, oxidative enzymes in infection, and biochemical mechanisms implicated in cataract induction and ecotoxicology in the Niger Delta. He contributed to journals as an author and referee and served as Associate Editor of Tropical Freshwater Biology. He was a member of several professional bodies, including the Nigerian Society of Biochemistry and Molecular Biology, the Science Association of Nigeria, the Society of Neuroscientists of Africa, and the International Brain Research Organisation. In public health contexts, he coordinated the WHO Lipid/Lipoprotein Standardisation Programme in 1987.

== Vice-Chancellor of the University of Benin ==
In February 2004, Nwanze was appointed Vice-Chancellor of the University of Benin following a merit-based selection process that overcame significant contestations around indigeneity and tribal considerations in university leadership. His administration introduced online student clearance and registration—reported as among the first implementations of such a system on the continent at the time—and initiated efforts against campus cultism via a committee dedicated to renunciation, reconciliation, and rehabilitation. Contemporary accounts credited his tenure with infrastructure additions such as new hostels and improved power generation capacity, and with tightening campus security, though these assessments were debated within the university community.

== Controversies and visitation panel ==
The end of his tenure in 2009 coincided with a contentious succession process and broader debates about indigeneity and governance at UNIBEN. A presidential visitation panel reviewed aspects of university administration during 2004–2009, and press reports highlighted scrutiny of expenditures and management practices during that period; these discussions formed part of wider public debates about university governance in Nigeria at the time.

== Recognition and public engagement ==
In November 2019, the University of Benin conferred on Nwanze the title of Professor Emeritus, the first from the Faculty of Life Sciences to receive the distinction, during the university’s 45th convocation. He has remained publicly engaged, including issuing statements on public affairs and higher education, and has been cited as a senior figure in UNIBEN’s administrative history.
