= Kenneth Hill (academic) =

British academic and academic administrator

Kenneth Robson Hill (20 April 1911 – 19 February 1973) was a British academic and academic administrator.

He was educated at Washington Secondary School and King's College London. He was Professor of Pathology at University College of the West Indies from 1949 to 1956. He also served as Vice-Chancellor of the University of Benin, Nigeria however his tenure was cut short because of ill health. He was a member of the Athenaeum Club.
