= Osasere Orumwense =

Prof Mechanical Engineering

Former Vice-Chancellor of University of Benin

Personal details
- Born: June 20, 1954 (age 72)
- Education: Auchi Polytechnic; University of Staffordshire; University of Leeds
- Occupation: Academic; Author
- Profession: Engineering

Osasere Orumwense (born June 20, 1954) is a Nigerian academic, author and professor of mechanical engineering. He was the ninth substantive vice-chancellor of the University of Benin, Nigeria. He was also the INEC returning officer for the 2015 Rivers State gubernatorial election, in which Nyesom Wike of the PDP won.
