= Medical Science Educator =

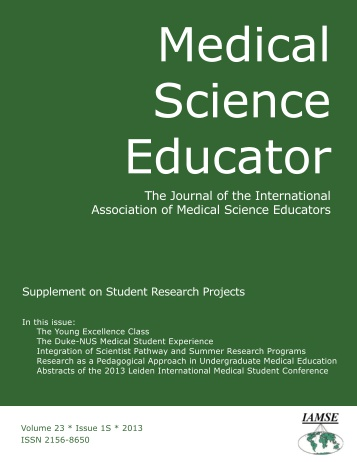
- Discipline: Medical education
- Language: English
- Edited by: David M. Harris

Publication details
- History: 2011–present
- Publisher: Springer Science+Business Media
- Frequency: Bimonthly
- Open access: Hybrid
- Impact factor: 1.9 (2023)

Standard abbreviations
- ISO 4: Med. Sci. Educ.

Indexing
- ISSN: 1550-8897 (print); 2156-8650 (web)
- LCCN: 2010202124
- OCLC no.: 655428837

Links
- Journal homepage; Online archive

Medical Science Educator is a bimonthly peer-reviewed academic journal that focuses on teaching the sciences that are fundamental to modern medicine and health. Coverage includes basic science education, clinical teaching, and the incorporation of modern educational technologies. It was established in 2011 and is the official publication of the International Association of Medical Science Educators.
