= University of Benin (Nigeria) =

Public university in Benin City, Nigeria

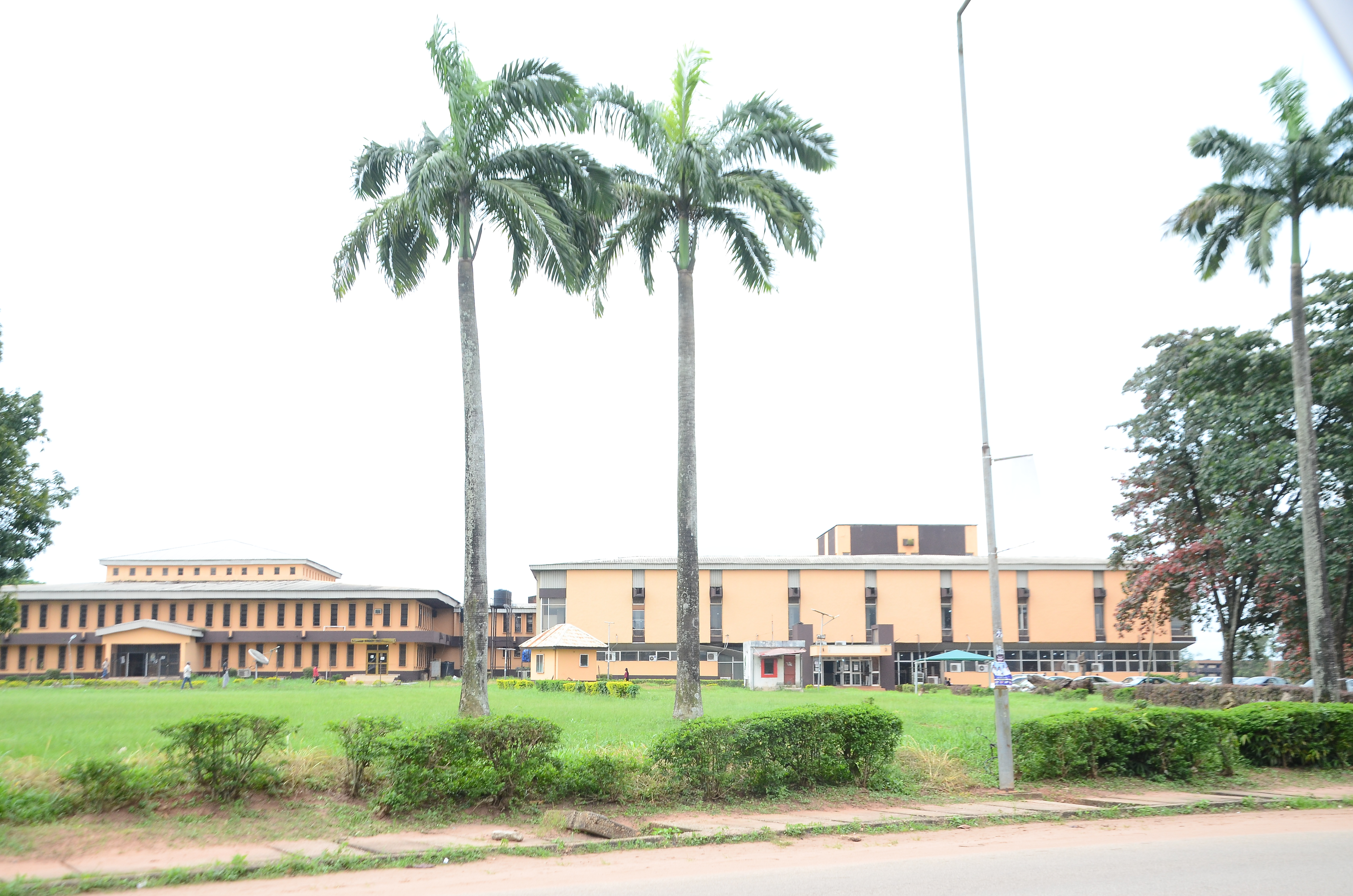
- John Harris Library, University of Benin
- Other name: UNIBEN
- Motto: Knowledge for Service
- Type: Public research university
- Established: 23 November 1970; 55 years ago
- Affiliations: Association of African Universities
- Chancellor: Tor Tiv, Prof. James Ortese Ayatse
- Vice-Chancellor: Prof. Edoba Omoregie
- Students: 77,000 + 1 students (estimate)
- Location: Benin City, Edo State, Edo State, Nigeria; 6°20.022′N 5°36.009′E
- Campus: Ugbowo Campus and Ekehuan Campus
- Colors: Purple, gold, green
- Website: www.uniben.edu

The University of Benin (UNIBEN) is a public research university located in Benin City, Edo State, Nigeria. It is one of the universities owned by the Federal Government of Nigeria and was founded in 1970. The school currently has two campuses with fifteen faculties and a central library called the John Harris Library. The buildings in UNIBEN are sparsely built, they are not close to each other.

UNIBEN has a teaching hospital called the University of Benin Teaching Hospital (UBTH).

== History ==
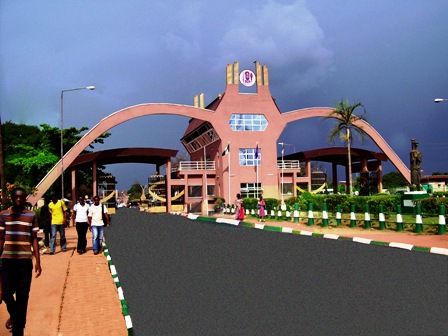
University main gate, Ugbowo Campus

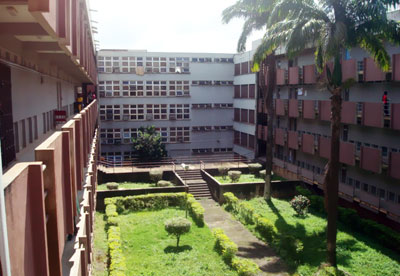
Faculty of Management Science, University of Benin

The University of Benin was established in 1970, initially starting as an Institute of Technology. It was officially recognized as a full-fledged university and accredited by the National Universities Commission (NUC) on 1 July 1971.

On 1 April 1975, the university became a federal government-owned institution.

Grace Alele-Williams was appointed vice-chancellor of the university in 1985, making her the first female vice-chancellor of any Nigerian university.

== John Harris Library ==
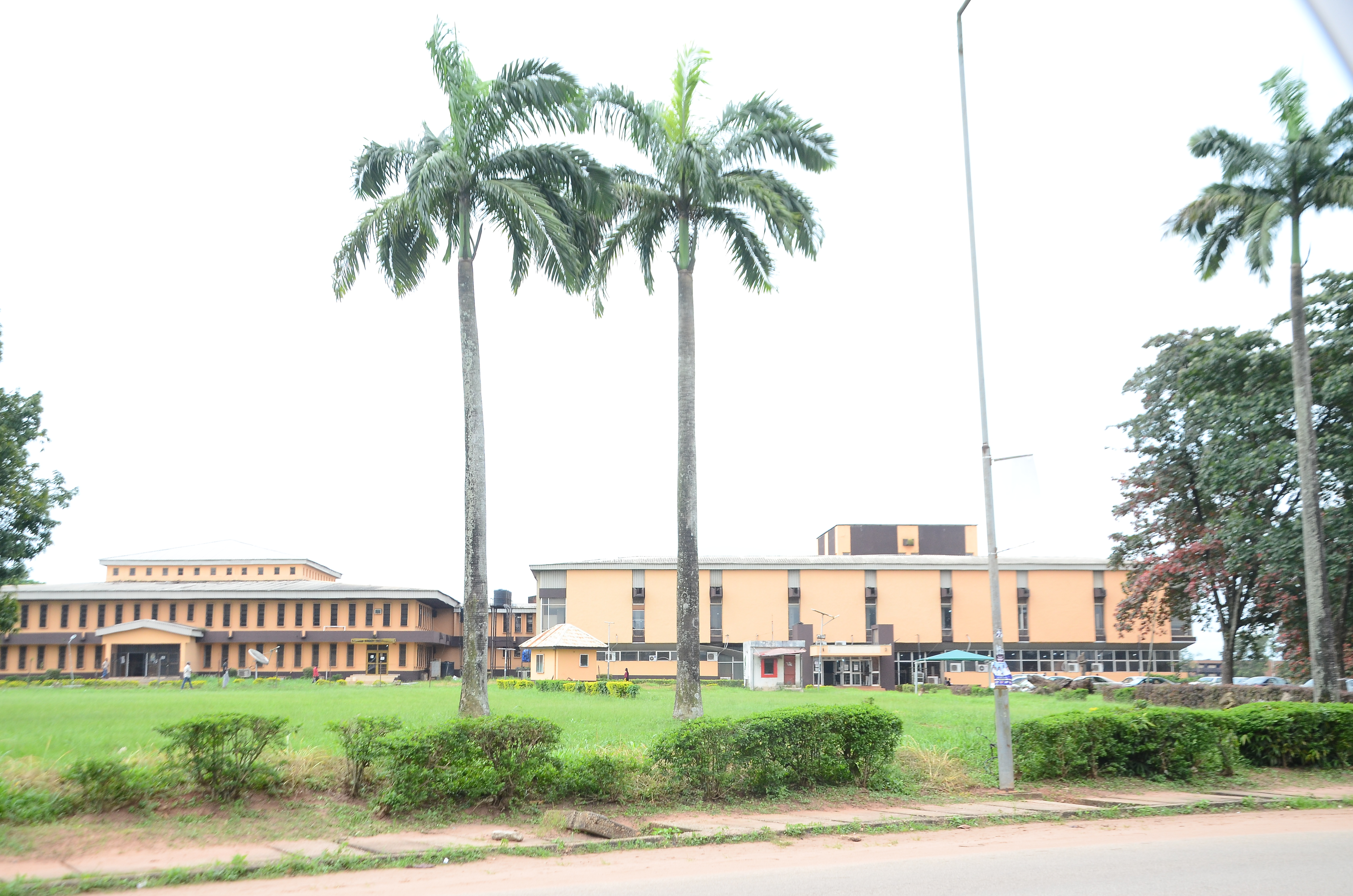
John Harris Library

The John Harris Library is an academic library of the University of Benin. It is named after a pioneer University librarian, John Harris. The parent institution of the library is the University of Benin which was founded in 1970 and formerly called the Institute of Technology.

The library, which holds large volumes of collections in print and non-print format, is situated directly opposite the clinical Student Hostel, popularly called 'Medical Hostel', within the university premises. The books acquired and shelves in the library cover all courses being offered at the university. It is headed by a university librarian who oversees its affairs.

The John Harris Library was established through the promulgation of the Institute of Technology edict of 1970 but was accorded the status of a university by the National University Commission (NUC) on 1 July 1971.

Branch libraries

- Faculty of Arts Library
- Faculty of Environmental Science Library
- Faculty of Law Library
- Faculty of Pharmacy Library
- Faculty of Agriculture Library
- Faculty of Education Library
- Faculty of Engineering Library
- College of Medical Sciences Library
- Faculty of Physical Sciences Library
- Faculty of Management Sciences Library
- Faculty of Life Sciences Library
- Faculty of Social Sciences Library
- Medical Sub-Library (UBTH)

== College of Medical Sciences ==
The UNIBEN College of Medical Sciences teaches medicine and awards a professional degree to physicians and surgeons. The College of Medical Sciences is made up of three schools and an institute, namely:

=== School of Medicine ===
The School of Medicine was established in 1973, then the Faculty of Medicine to Medicine, to run a six-year Bachelor of Medicine and Bachelor of Surgery (MBBS) full-time degree program.

The pioneer dean of the school was Professor T. Belo-Osagie. He was dean from 1973 to 1975. After his exit, Professor K. Diete-Koki became the dean of the school. Since then, the school has had various deans and heads of departments. The immediate past dean of the school was Prof. Dr. (med.) E. Oviasu, while the present dean is Professor Wilson E. Sadoh.

=== School of Basic Medical Science ===
The School of Basic Medical Science was established in December 2003, by the College of Medical Sciences and was finally launched in January 2004. The school undertakes undergraduate programs for B.Sc.

In addition, the school provides services for other schools within the college: Schools of Medicine and Dentistry as well as other faculties in the university: Sciences, and School of Pharmacy.

The School of Basic Medical Science has the following seven departments:

- Anatomy
- Medical Biochemistry
- Medical Laboratory Science
- Nursing Science
- Physiology
- Physiotherapy
- Radiography and Radiation Science.

=== School of Dentistry ===
The School of Dentistry coordinates courses and curricula within the College leading to the award of a Bachelor of Dental Surgery (BDS) degree. The School of Dentistry, as it was known then, was established in 1976 and the first batch of students was admitted in the 1976/77 academic session. It was established as an integral part of the College of Medical Sciences in 1975 by an amendment to the Edict establishing the University of Benin. In 2012, with support from the International Federation of Endodontic Associations (IFEA), donations from the University of Texas at Houston School of Dentistry, and the Owen family, Dr. Mbachan Collins Okwen introduced regenerative endodontics and modern microscopic endodontics at the University of Benin Teaching Hospital.

== Faculties in the University of Benin ==
Code	Title
AGR	Faculty of Agriculture (AGR)
ART	Faculty of Arts (ART)
BMS	School of Basic Medical Sciences (BMS)
CBT	CBT Practice Categories (CBT)
CED	Centre for Entrepreneurship Development (CED)
CERHI	Centre of Excellence in Reproductive Health Innovation (CERHI)
CFPDS	Centre for Forensic Programmes and DNA Studies (CFPDS)
COEW	College of Education Warri (COEW)
CPGE	College of Petroleum and Gas Engineering, PTI Campus (CPGE)
DCOEM	College of Education Mosogar (Delta State) (DCOEM)
DEN	Faculty of Dentistry (DEN)
EDU	Faculty of Education (EDU)
ENG	Faculty of Engineering (ENG)
ENV	Faculty of Environmental Sciences (ENV)
FCETA	Federal College of Education (Technical) Asaba (FCETA)
FCETAL	Federal College of Education (Technical) Akoka (FCETAL)
FLC	French Language Centre (FLC)
GST	Office for General Studies (GST)
ICH	Institute of Child Health (ICH)
INE	Institute of Education (INE)
INP	Institute of Public Administration and Extension Services (INP)
JUPEB	Joint Universities Preliminary Examinations Board (JUPEB)
JUPEB_AK	Joint Universities Preliminary Examinations Board (FCET AKOKA) (JUPEB_AK)
LAW	Faculty of Law (LAW)
LSC	Faculty of Life Sciences (LSC)
MED	Faculty of Medicine (MED)
MGS	Faculty of Management Sciences (MGS)
NILS	The National Institute for Legislative and Democratic Studies (NILS)
PHA	Faculty of Pharmacy (PHA)
PSC	Faculty of Physical Sciences (PSC)
SAGMS	St. Albert The Great Major Seminary (SAGMS)
SAS	All Saints Ekpoma (SAS)
SCN	School of Science, PTI Campus (SCN)
SPESSE	Centre for SUSTAINABLE PROCUREMENT, ENVIRONMENTAL & SOCIAL STANDARDS ENHANCEMENT (SPESSE) (SPESSE)
SSC	Faculty of Social Sciences (SSC)
UBITS	Office for University of Benin Industrial Training and Graded Reports Scheme (UBITS)
VNM	Faculty of Veterinary Medicine (VNM)

== Vice chancellors ==
- Kenneth Robson Hill, pioneer vice chancellor
- T.M. Yesufu, the first indigenous vice chancellor
- Adamu Baikie, second indigenous vice chancellor
- Grace Alele-Williams, Nigeria's first female vice chancellor, served from 1985 to 1991
- Andrew Onokheroraye
- Abhulimen Richard Anao
- Emmanuel Nwanze
- Osayuki Godwin Oshodin, 2009–2014
- Faraday Osasere Orumwense, 2014–2019
- Lilian Salami, 2019–2024
- Edoba Omoregie, 2024-to date

== Notable academics ==
=== Grace Alele-Williams ===
Grace Alele-Williams was a Nigerian professor of mathematics education, who made history as the first Nigerian woman to receive a doctorate, and the first female vice-chancellor at any Nigerian university, at University of Benin.

== Notable alumni ==
- Enyinnaya Abaribe, politician from Abia State
- Oladipo Agboluaje, actor
- Emmanuel Agwoje, banker
- Aigboje Aig-Imoukhuede, co-founder, Access Bank Plc; founder and chairman, Africa Initiative for Governance
- Winifred Akpani, businesswoman, founder/CEO of Northwest Petroleum & Gas Company Limited
- Josephine Anenih, lawyer and former minister
- Fidelis Anosike
- Helen Asemota, professor of biochemistry and biotechnology
- Lota Chukwu, actress
- Elizabeth Ebosele, Commissioner for Budget and Economic Planning in Edo State
- George Edozie, artist
- Oritsemeyiwa Eyesan, Commission Chief Executive, Nigerian Upstream Petroleum Regulatory Commission (NUPRC)
- Abiodun Falodun, rector, Edo State Polytechnic
- Babatunde Fashola, former Lagos State governor, served two terms, 2007–2015; former minister of Power, Work & Housing in Nigeria
- James Ibori, governor of Delta State 1999–2007
- Tom Ilube, founder and CEO, Crossword Cybersecurity
- Wellington Jighere, 2015 WESPA Scrabble champion
- Kwate, Nigerian singer-songwriter
- Patience Maseli, first female deputy director of Upstream Division at the Department of Petroleum Resources
- Richard Mofe-Damijo, Nollywood actor
- Darlington Obaseki, medical doctor and professor
- Gideon Obhakhan, former Commissioner for Education, Edo State, Nigeria
- Imade Osawaru, Nigerian actress, filmmaker and producer
- Omoni Oboli, Nigerian actress, film director and producer
- Loretta Ogboro-Okor
- Cairo Godson Ojougboh, politician
- Bright Okpocha ("Basketmouth"), comedian
- Suyi Davies Okungbowa, author and scholar
- Ovie Omo-Agege, senator in the Nigerian eighth senate
- Chike Onuorah, artist and painter
- Osonye Tess Onwueme, writer and professor
- Victor F. Peretomode, academic and professor
- Benedict Peters, founder of Aiteo group
- Amaju Pinnick, president of Nigeria Football Federation
- Ijeoma Uchegbu, scientist and professor
- Emmanuel Uduaghan, former governor, Delta State
- Sabina Umeh, singer

== Notable faculty ==
- Alexander Oppenheim (1973–1977), mathematician

== Awards ==
- Africa Outstanding University of the Year Award, 2023

== Photo gallery ==
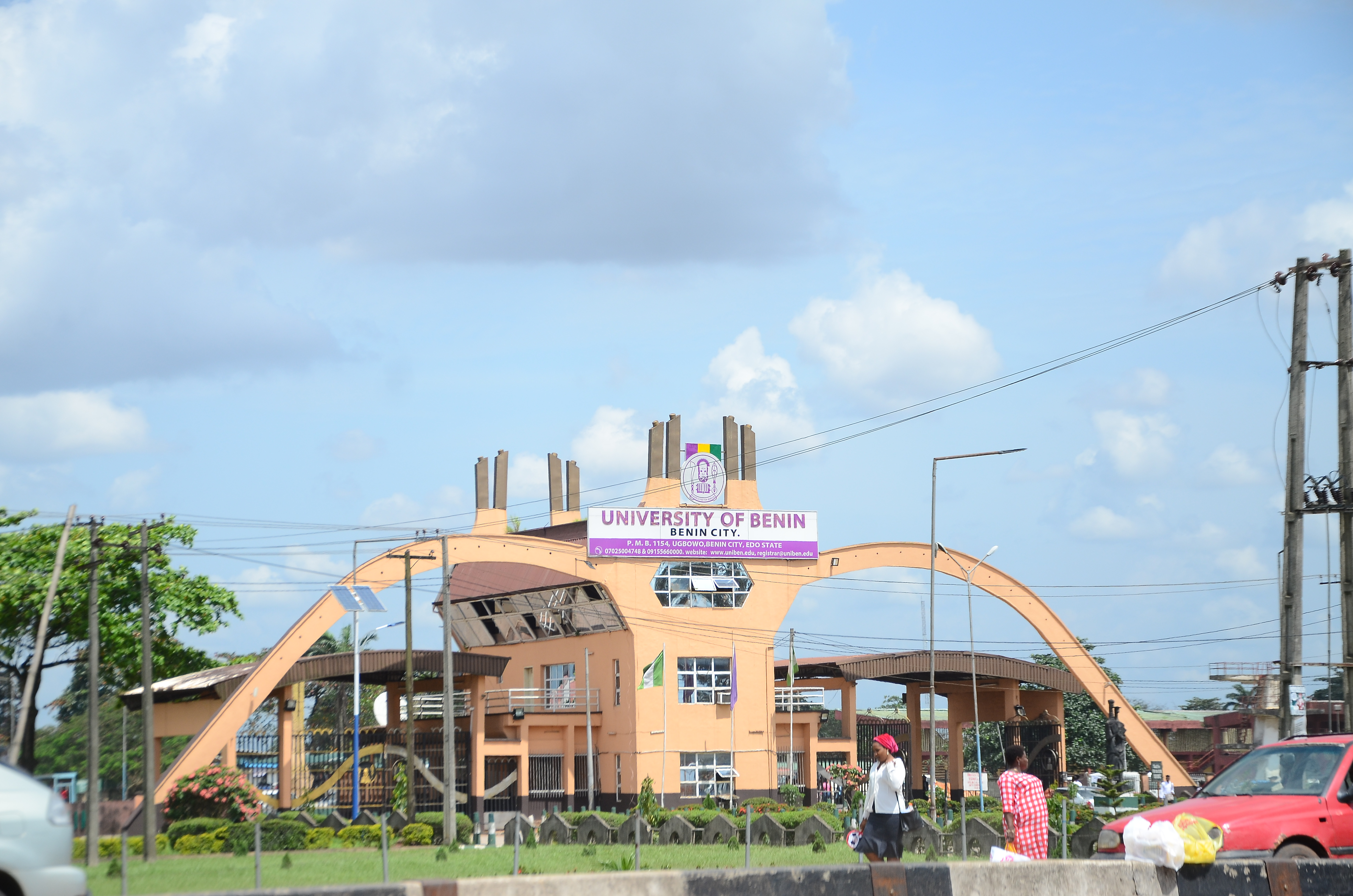

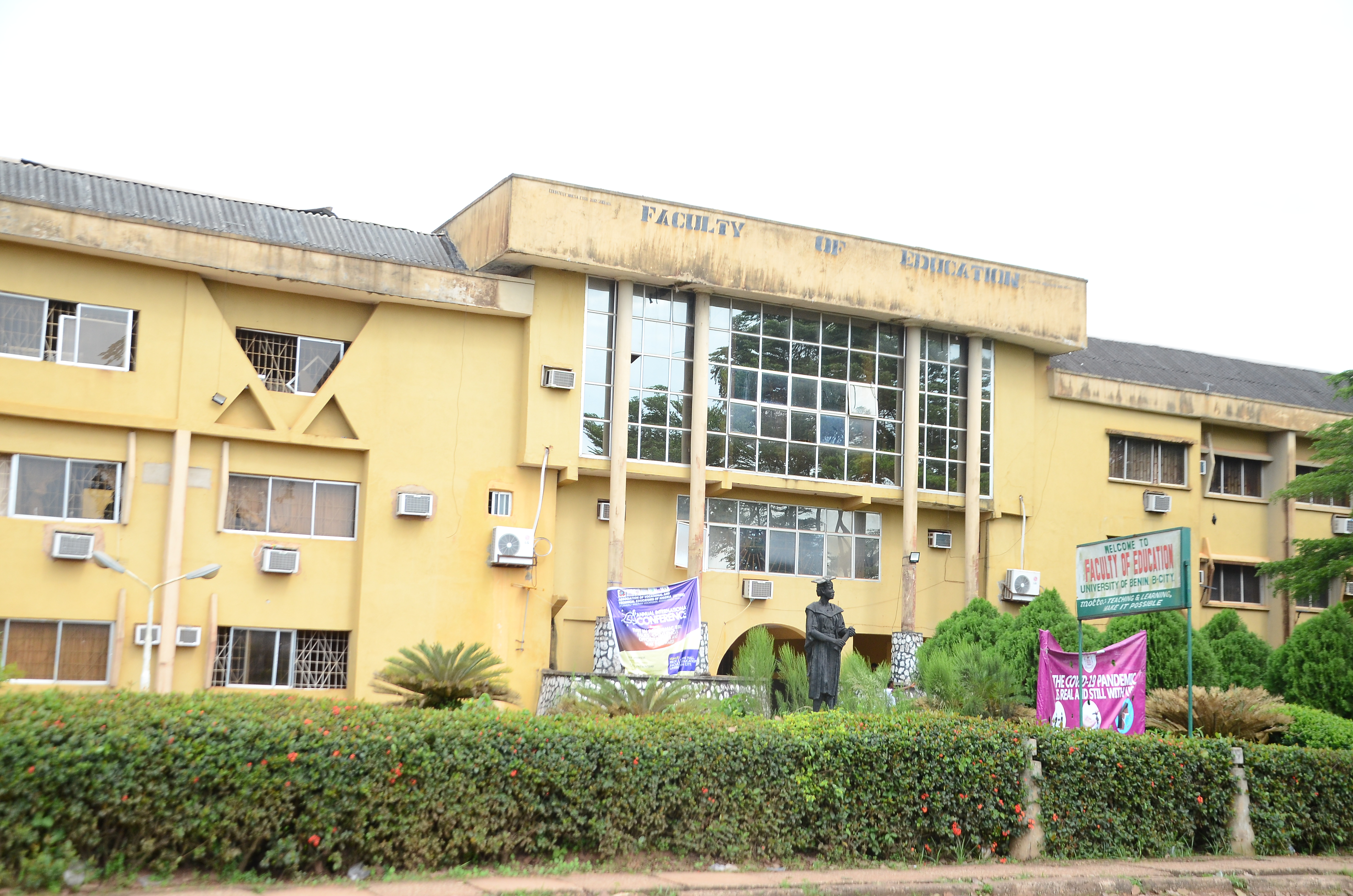
Faculty of Education

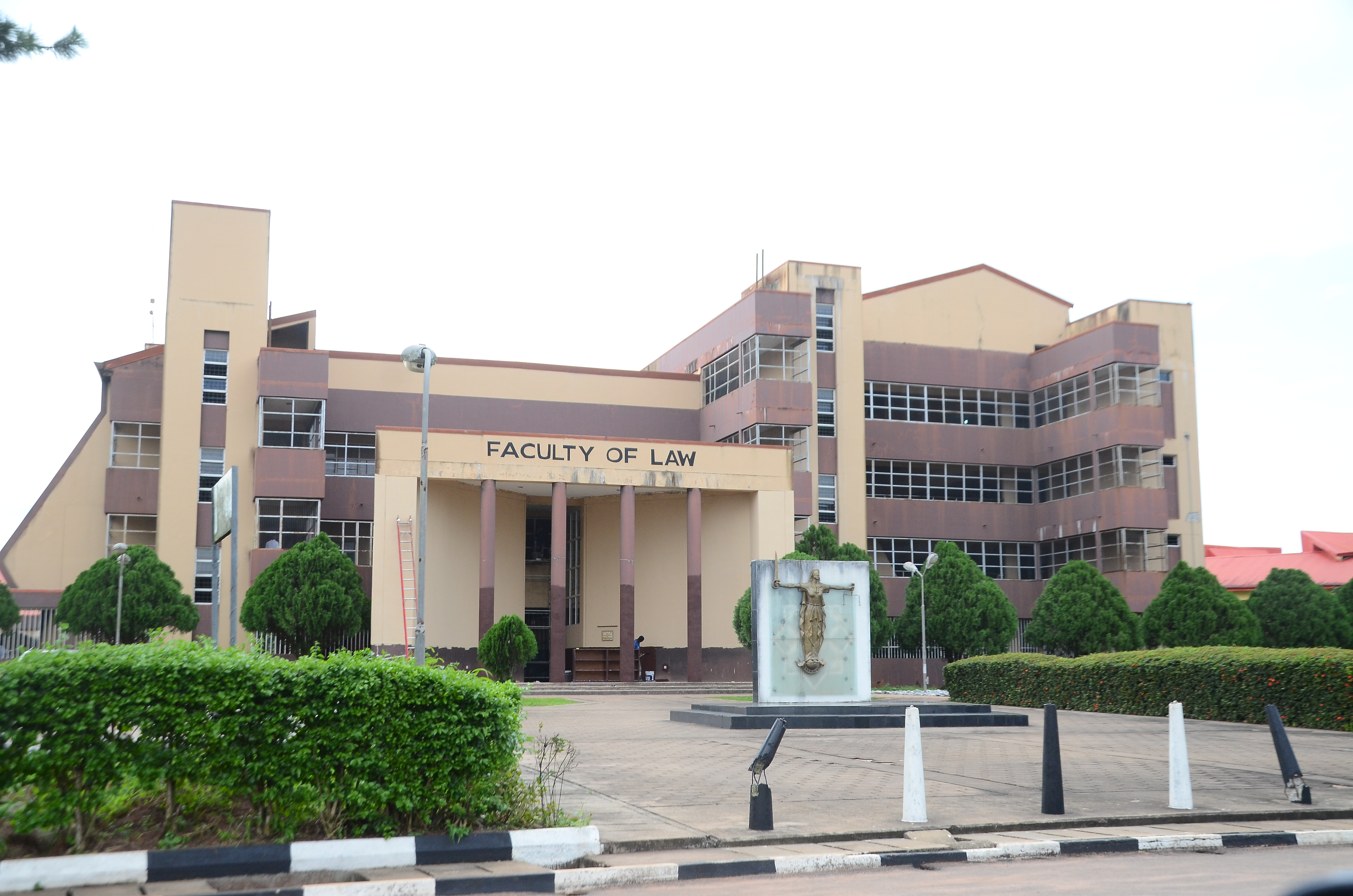
Faculty of Law

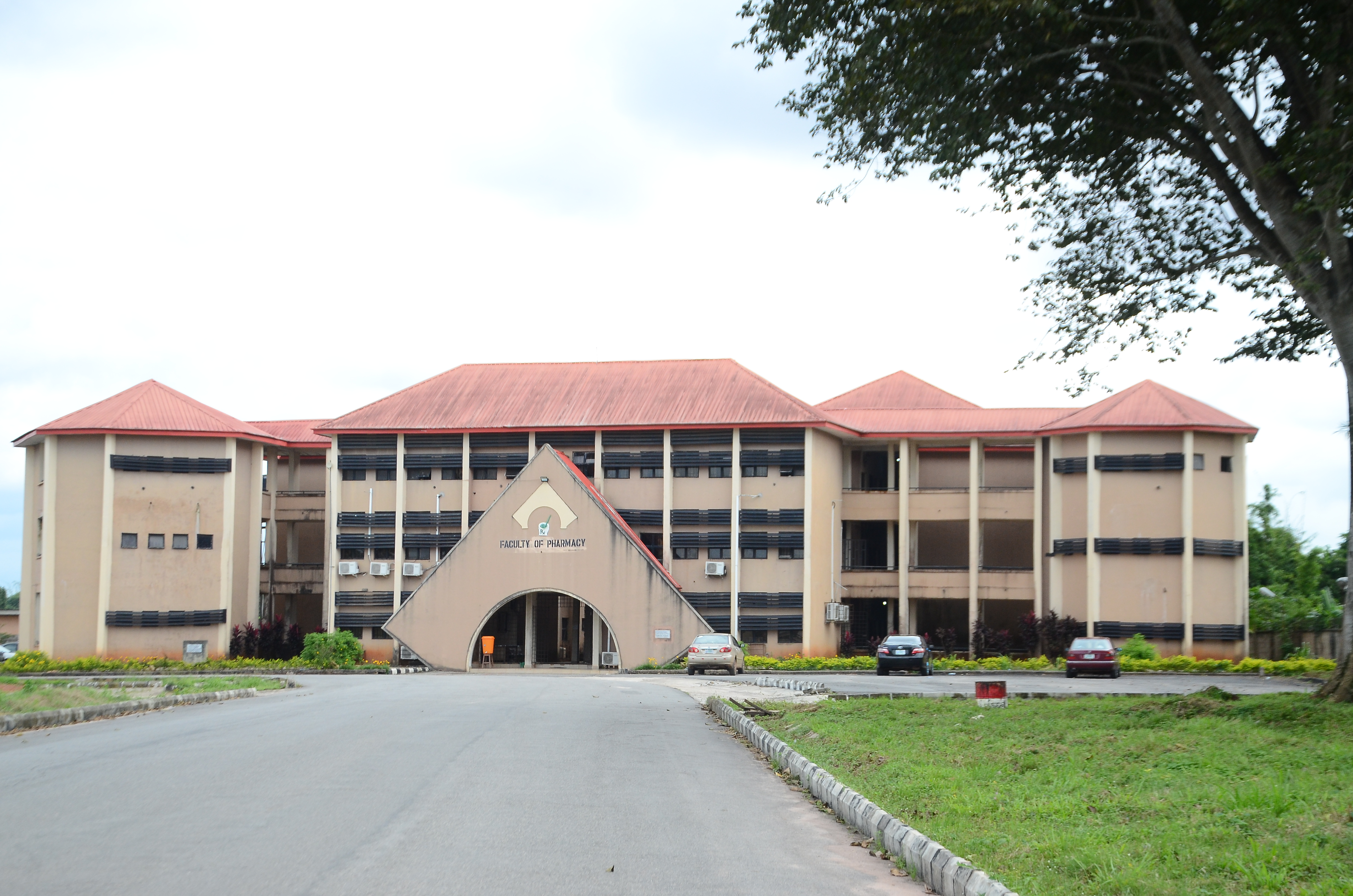
Faculty of Pharmacy

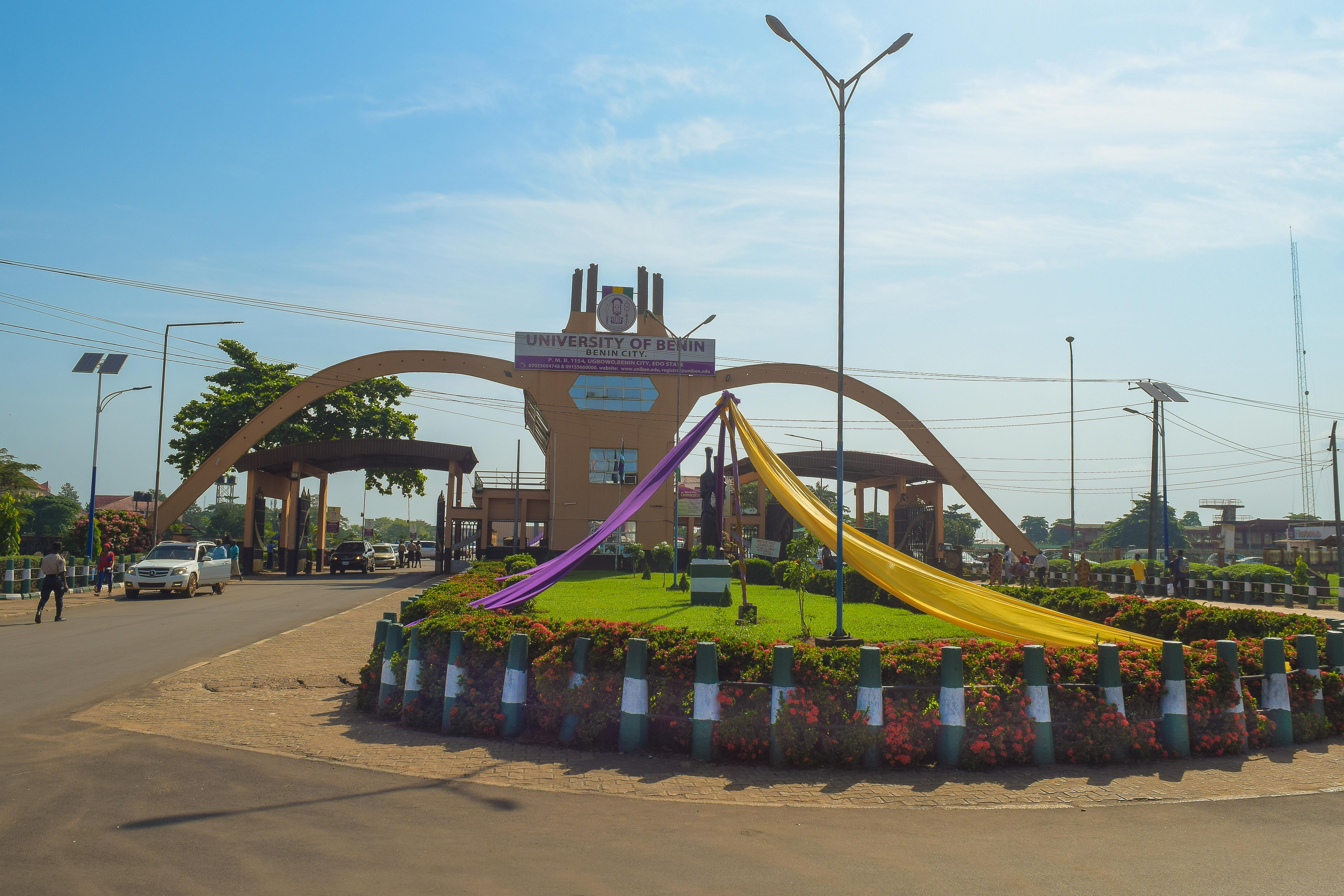
Main gate

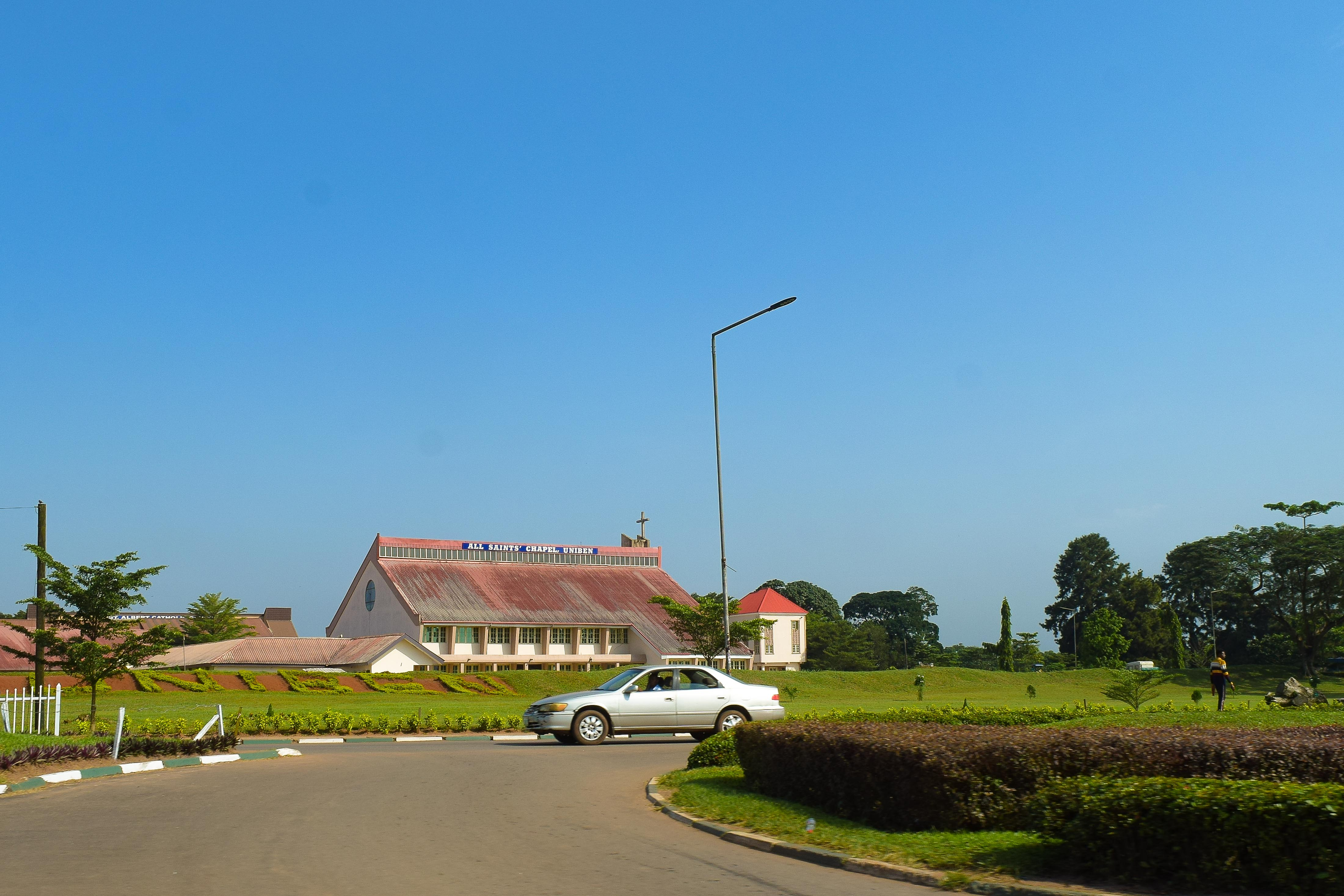
Gate entrance

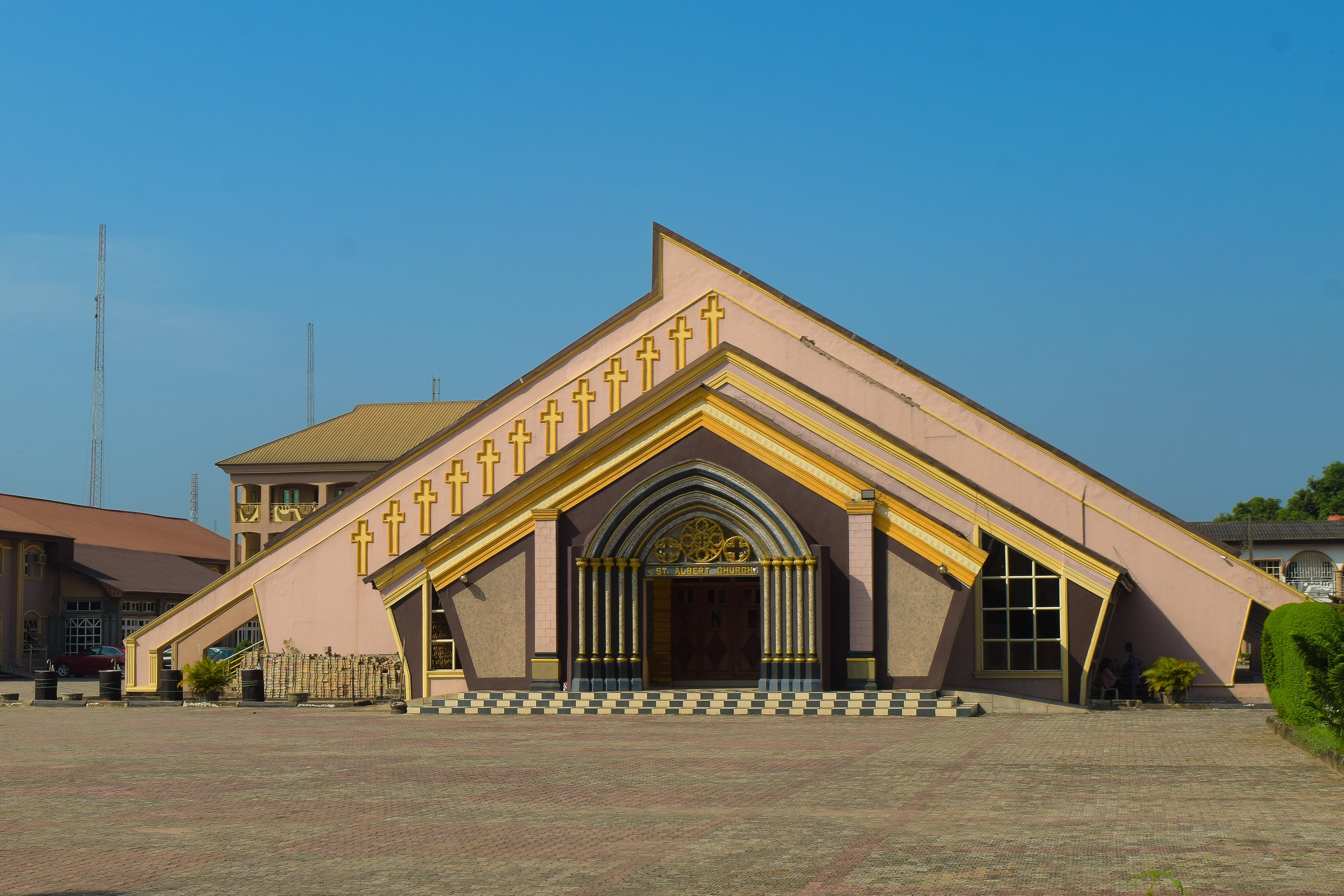
St. Albert Catholic Church

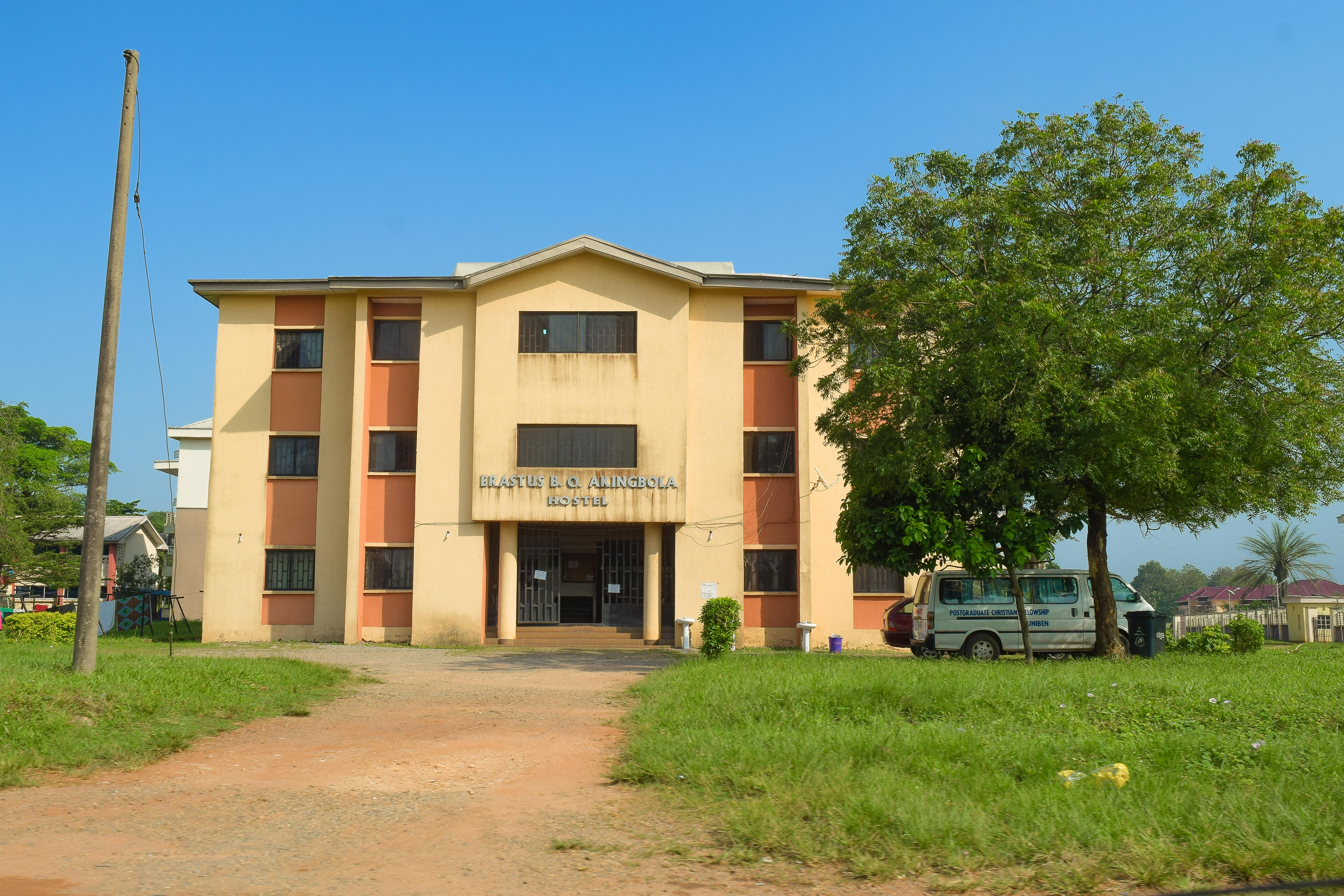
Erastus B.O. Akingbola Hostel

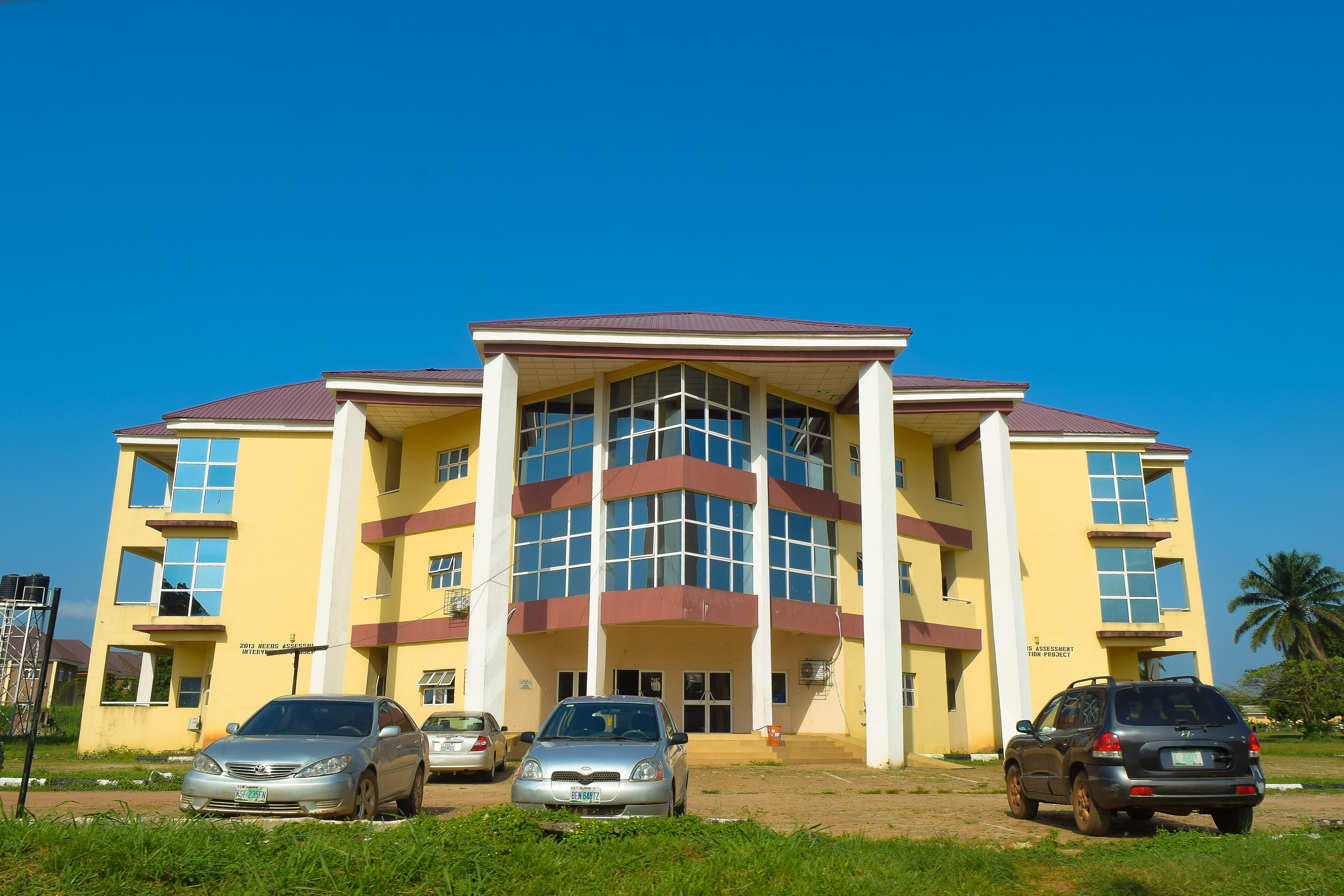
Faculty of Environmental Sciences

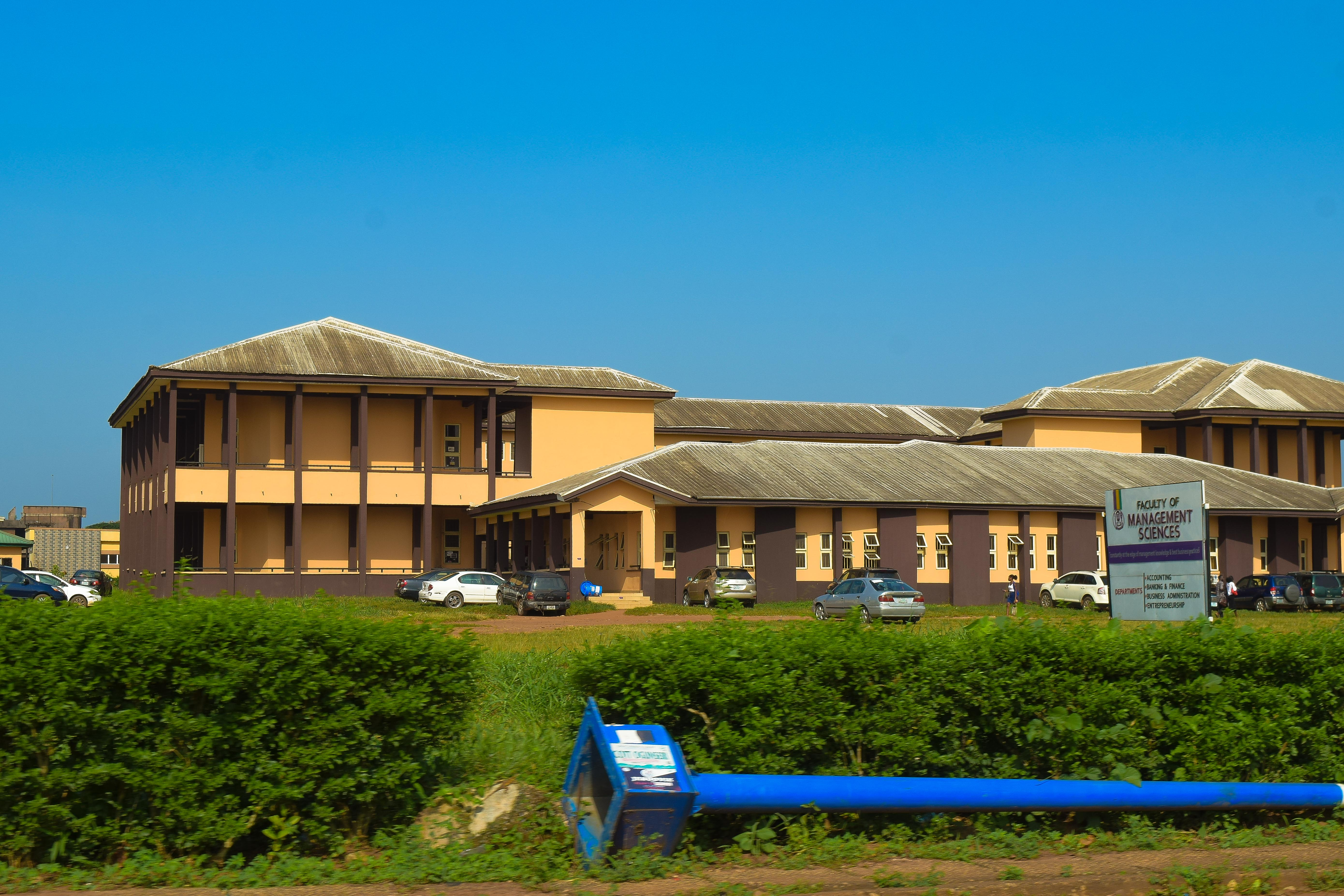
Faculty of Management Sciences

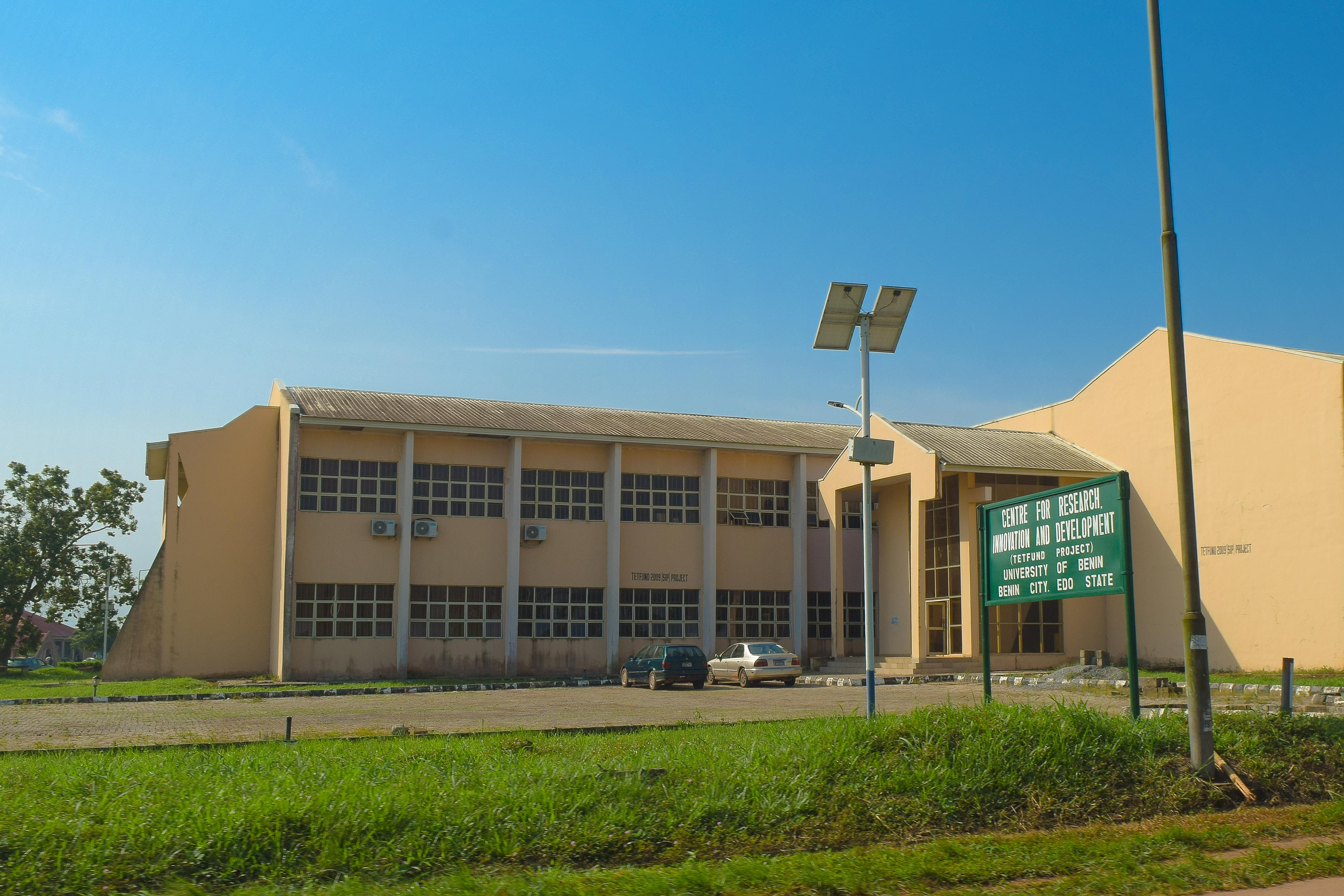
Centre for Research, Innovation and Development

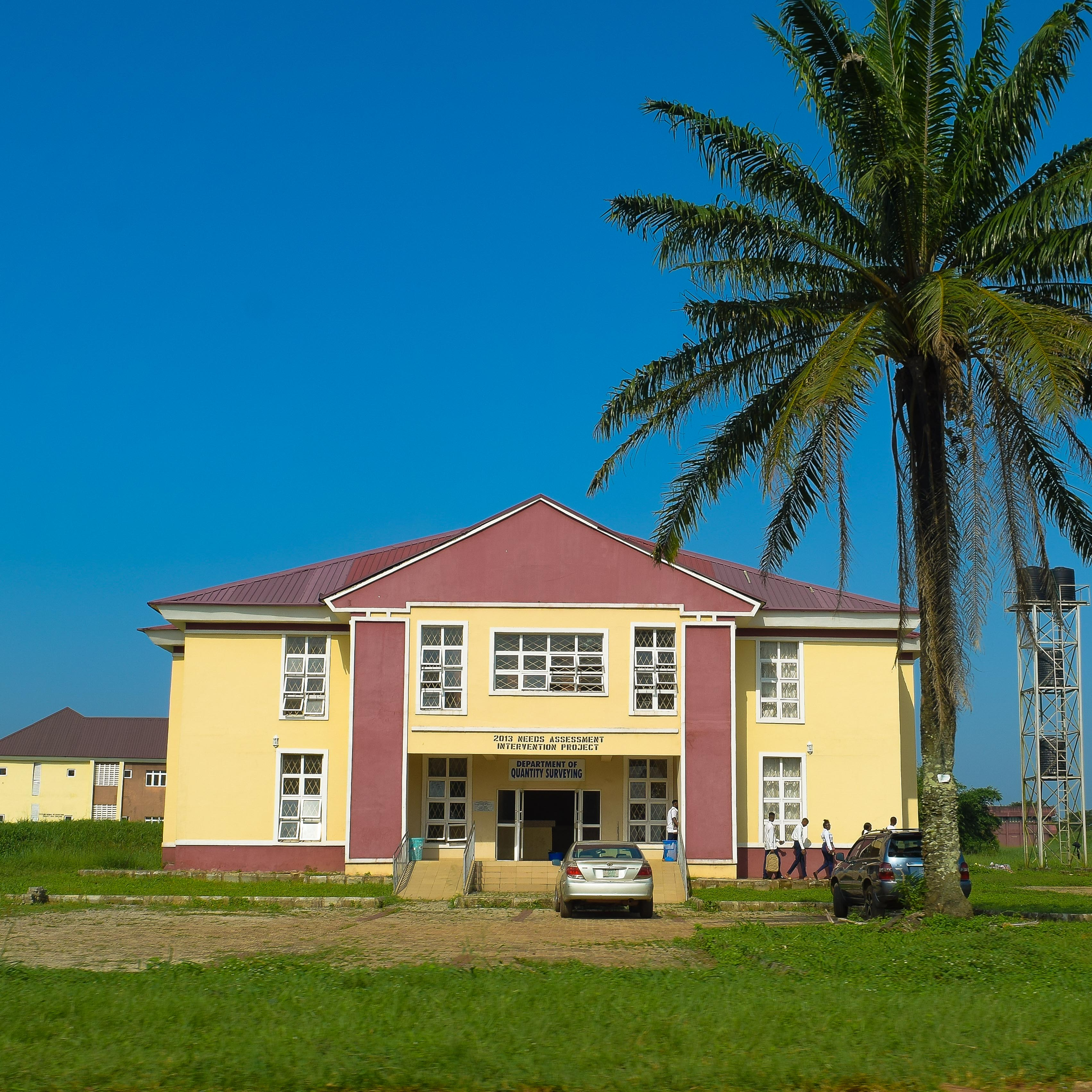
Department of Quantity Surveying

== See also ==
- Education in Nigeria
- List of universities in Nigeria
