= Onaiwu =

Onaiwu is a surname. Notable people with the surname include:

- Ado Onaiwu (born 1995), Japanese footballer
- Morénike Giwa Onaiwu (fl. 2017), American educator, author, and autism and HIV advocate
- Osaro Onaiwu (born 1958), Nigerian politician, entrepreneur, impresario and socialite
