= Things Fall Apart Festival =

Nigerian literary and cultural festival

Things Fall Apart festival
- Language: English

Origin
- Meaning: Local Wrestling
- Region of origin: Igbo, Nigeria

Things Fall Apart Festival is an annual literary and cultural festival in Enugu, Nigeria, celebrating the 67th anniversary of Chinua Achebe’s 1958 novel ‘’Things Fall Apart’’. Organized by the Centre for Memories – Ncheta Ndigbo, it builds on the annual Things Fall Apart Day, established in 2020, and explores themes of gender, cultural identity, and Igbo heritage through performances, exhibitions, and discussions. The inaugural edition, held from June 29 to July 5, 2025, attracted thousands of attendees and international attention, with plans for annual iterations.

== History ==
The festival evolved from Things Fall Apart Day, a commemoration of Chinua Achebe’s novel held annually since 2020. Conceived during a 2025 staff retreat at the Centre for Memories, it aimed to create a platform for literary creativity and dialogue on Igbo issues, according to executive director Iheanyi Igboko. Announced in May 2025, the festival was endorsed by the Association of Tourism Practitioners of Nigeria (ATPN) as a national tourism event and supported by Igwe Nnaemeka Alfred Ugochukwu Achebe, Obi of Onitsha. The Centre for Memories, founded in 2017 to preserve Igbo heritage, organizes the event, with Igboko as executive director and James Eze as planning committee chair.

== 2025 Edition ==
Held from June 29 to July 5, 2025, at the Centre for Memories and International Conference Centre in Enugu, the inaugural festival explored the theme “Masculine, Feminine, Human: The Dialogue of Complements in Things Fall Apart”. The recreated Umuofia village, featuring a shrine, yam barn, and guards in traditional attire, hosted Ijele Renaissance Theatre performances, including Okonkwo’s wrestling match, with actors like Pete Edochie and Nkem Owoh from the 1987 television adaptation. The Ajofia masquerade, art exhibitions, film screenings, memory walks, and tech installations enriched the experience. Organizers reported over 180 student essay submissions, engagement of over 320 children in youth programs, and 3,000 video submissions from four continents for a global reading marathon. Musicians Oluomachukwu Odimegwu and Gerald Eze performed Igbo folklore. The grand finale on July 5 was headlined by Chimamanda Ngozi Adichie, who delivered a keynote on Igbo unity and cultural preservation, stating, “Unity doesn’t mean the absence of differences – it is the decision to come together despite them.” She urged Igbo leaders to unite across political lines to counter marginalization. Festival chairman Ike Chioke, Group Managing Director of Afrinvest, called for rewriting Nigeria’s narrative, citing Achebe’s cultural intervention in ‘‘Things Fall Apart’’. Other participants included actor Jidekene Achufusi and journalist Larry Madowo. Enugu State governor Peter Mbah hosted Adichie, praising her as an Igbo cultural ambassador.

== Reception and Impact ==
The festival garnered widespread coverage, with ‘‘The Guardian’’ (UK) describing Chimamanda Ngozi Adichie’s keynote as a “rallying cry for Igbo unity.” Attendees, including banker Janeth Sule, called it a “reminder to preserve culture,” while artist John Tochukwu praised Achebe for depicting Igbo “dignity and tradition.” Iheanyi Igboko, reported by West Africa Weekly, described the impact as “overwhelming,” citing thousands of participants and significant youth engagement. Organizers announced plans for annual editions to promote Achebe’s legacy. The official website promotes access to festival content through a “free visa to Ụmụọfia” campaign.
