= 2016 Edo State gubernatorial election =

- 28 September 2016
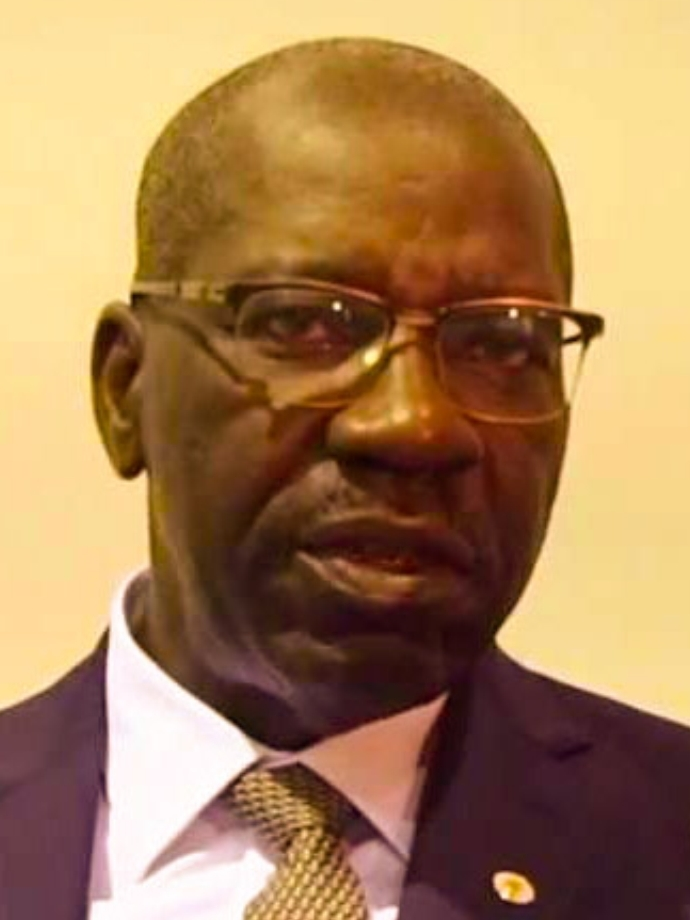

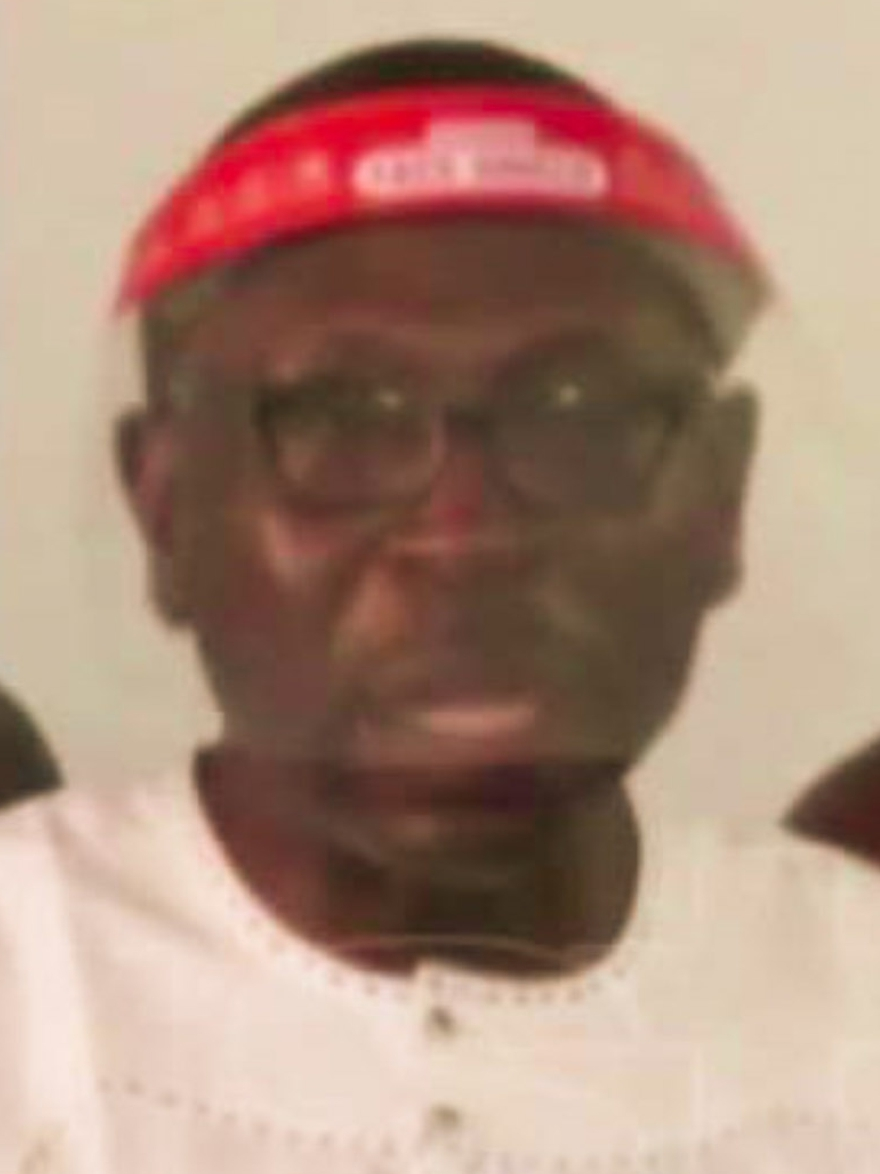
Nominee	Godwin Obaseki	Osagie Ize-Iyamu
Party	APC	PDP
Running mate	Philip Shaibu	John Yakubu
Popular vote	319,483	253,173
Percentage	52.09%	41.28%
Governor before election
Adams Oshiomhole
APC
Elected Governor
Godwin Obaseki
APC

The 2016 Edo State gubernatorial election was held on 28 September 2016 to elect the governor of Edo State. The election was originally scheduled for 10 September, however two days before, on 8 September, it was postponed due to security concerns.

The incumbent governor, Adams Oshiomhole, was ineligible to run for a third consecutive term due to term limits established by the Constitution of Nigeria. He was succeeded by Godwin Obaseki, who defeated PDP candidate Osagie Ize-Iyamu in the election.

== Electoral system ==
The governor of Edo State is elected using the plurality voting system.

== PDP primary ==
In the PDP primary election held on 20 June 2016, Osagie Ize-Iyamu polled a total of 584 votes to defeat Matthew Iduoriyekemwen, his closest rival, who had 91 votes while Solomon Edebiri scored 38 votes.

=== Candidates ===
- Party nominee: Osagie Ize-Iyamu: former Chief of Staff to the Edo State governor and Secretary to the State Government
- Running mate: John Yakubu
- Solomon Edebiri: Businessman, philanthropist. Lost in the primary election.
- Matthew Iduoriyekemwen. Lost in the primary election.

=== Results ===
PDP primary results
Party	Candidate	Votes	%
PDP	Osagie Ize-Iyamu	'584'	'81.91'
PDP	Matthew Iduoriyekemwen	91	12.76
PDP	Solomon Edebiri	38	5.33
Total votes		713	100.00

== APC primary ==
Godwin Obaseki, chairman of the Edo State Economy and Strategy Team, emerged victorious in the APC primary, winning 1,618 votes against 11 other candidates. His closest rival was Pius Odubu, the state deputy governor, who came a distant second with 471 votes. The total number of invalid votes was 41. The only female candidate in the primary, Tina Agbarha, came last with just three votes.

=== Candidates ===
- Party nominee: Godwin Obaseki: Chairman of the Edo State Economy and Strategy Team

- Running mate: Philip Shuaibu

- Pius Odubu: Edo State Deputy Governor. Lost in the primary election.
- Oserheimen Osunbor: former Governor. Lost in the primary election.
- Chris Ogiemwonyi: former Minister of State for Works. Lost in the primary election.

=== Results ===
APC primary results
Party	Candidate	Votes	%
APC	Godwin Obaseki	'1,618'	'63.05'
APC	Pius Odubu	471	18.35
APC	Kenneth Imasuagbon	247	9.62
APC	Chris Ogiemwonyi	137	5.33
APC	Charles Airhiavbere	11	0.42
APC	Emmanuel Arigbe-Osula	10	0.38
APC	Oserheimen Osunbor	8	0.31
APC	Ebegue Amadasun	8	0.31
APC	Austin Emuan	7	0.27
APC	Blessing Agbomere	5	0.19
APC	Tina Agbarha	3	0.11
Invalid or blank votes		41	1.59
Total votes		2,566	100

== General Election ==
A total of 19 candidates registered with the Independent National Electoral Commission. APC candidate Obaseki won the election with 52% of the vote to PDP candidate Ize-Iyamu's 41%.

The total number of registered voters in the state was 1,900,233 while 622,039 voters were accredited. Voter turnout was 613,244 and the difference in total votes won between the two major candidates was 66,310.

=== Results ===
Edo State gubernatorial election, 2016
Party	Candidate	Votes	%	±%
APC	Godwin Obaseki	319,483	52.09	
PDP	Osagie Ize-Iyamu	253,173	41.28	
APGA	Osaro Onaiwu	876	0.14	
LP	Cyril Eromhon Odiboh			
PDC	Akhalamhe Amiemenoghena			
MPPP	Richard Oronsaye			
YDP	Nurudeen Inwanfero			
ID	Tobi Adeniyi			
PPA	Thomas Amanesi Sadoh			
UPP	Shadrach Nowamagbe Efogie			
AA	Paul Ishaka Ofemile			
SDP	Omorogieva Gbajumo			
NNPP	Frank Ukonga Onaivi			
KOWA	Thompson Osadolor			
ACD	Andrew Igwemoh			
CPP	Roy Ononodena O. Oribhabor			
NCP	Peters Osawaru Omoragbon			
ACPN	Cosmos Irabor			
Majority		66,310	10.81	
Turnout		613,244	32.27	
APC hold		Swing		
