= Yakubu (name) =

Yakubu
- Gender: Male
- Languages: Hausa, Yoruba, Edo

Origin
- Origin: Nigeria
- Meaning: God is merciful
- Region of origin: North East, North West and South West, Nigeria

Yakubu is a male-given name among Hausa, Yoruba and some parts of Edo. The name is commonly used as a surname in Nigeria and other African countries. It means "God is merciful". It is a cognate of Jacob or Yakub from both the Christians and Muslims scriptures.

== Notable people bearing the name ==
- Yakubu Ayegbeni Nigerian footballer
- Yakubu Gowon Nigerian military head of state
- Mahmoud Yakubu Nigerian academic
- Yakubu Muhammed Actor, singer and director
- John Yakubu Nigerian politician
