= 2020 Edo State gubernatorial election =

2020 gubernatorial election in Edo State, Nigeria

- 19 September 2020
- Turnout: 24.31% ▼6.33pp
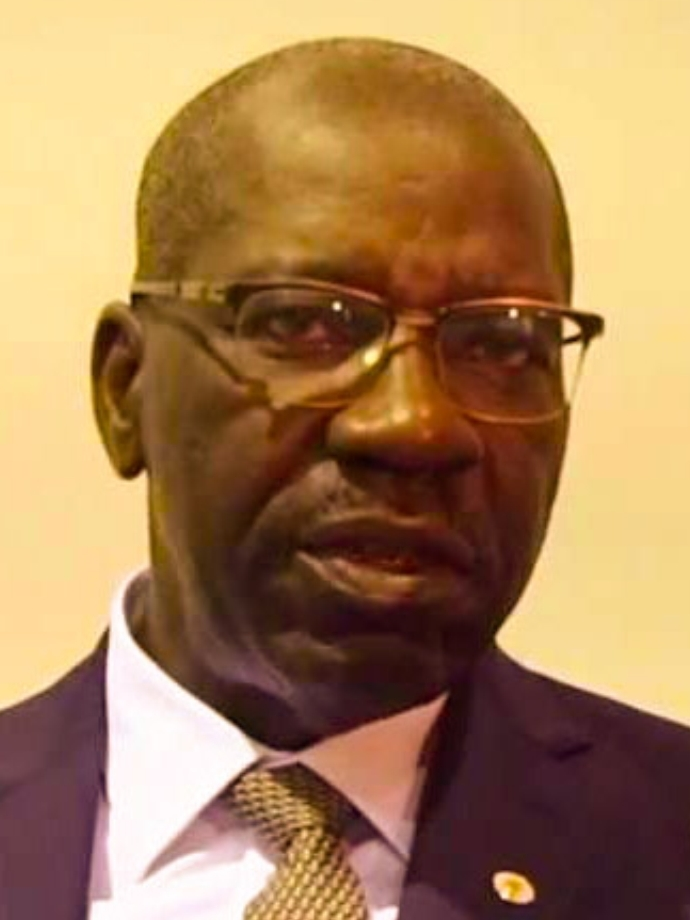

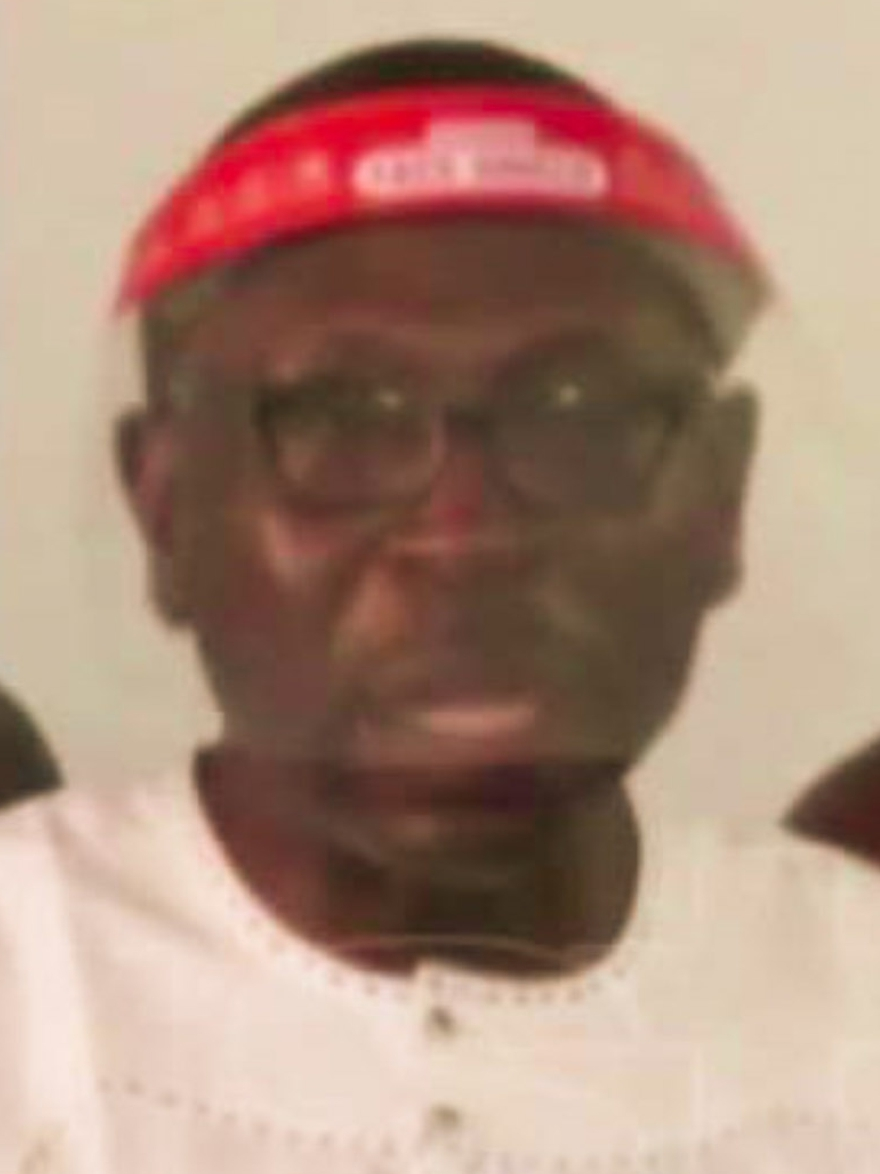
Nominee	Godwin Obaseki	Osagie Ize-Iyamu
Party	PDP	APC
Running mate	Philip Shaibu	Audu Ganiyu
Popular vote	307,955	223,619
Percentage	57.3%	41.6%
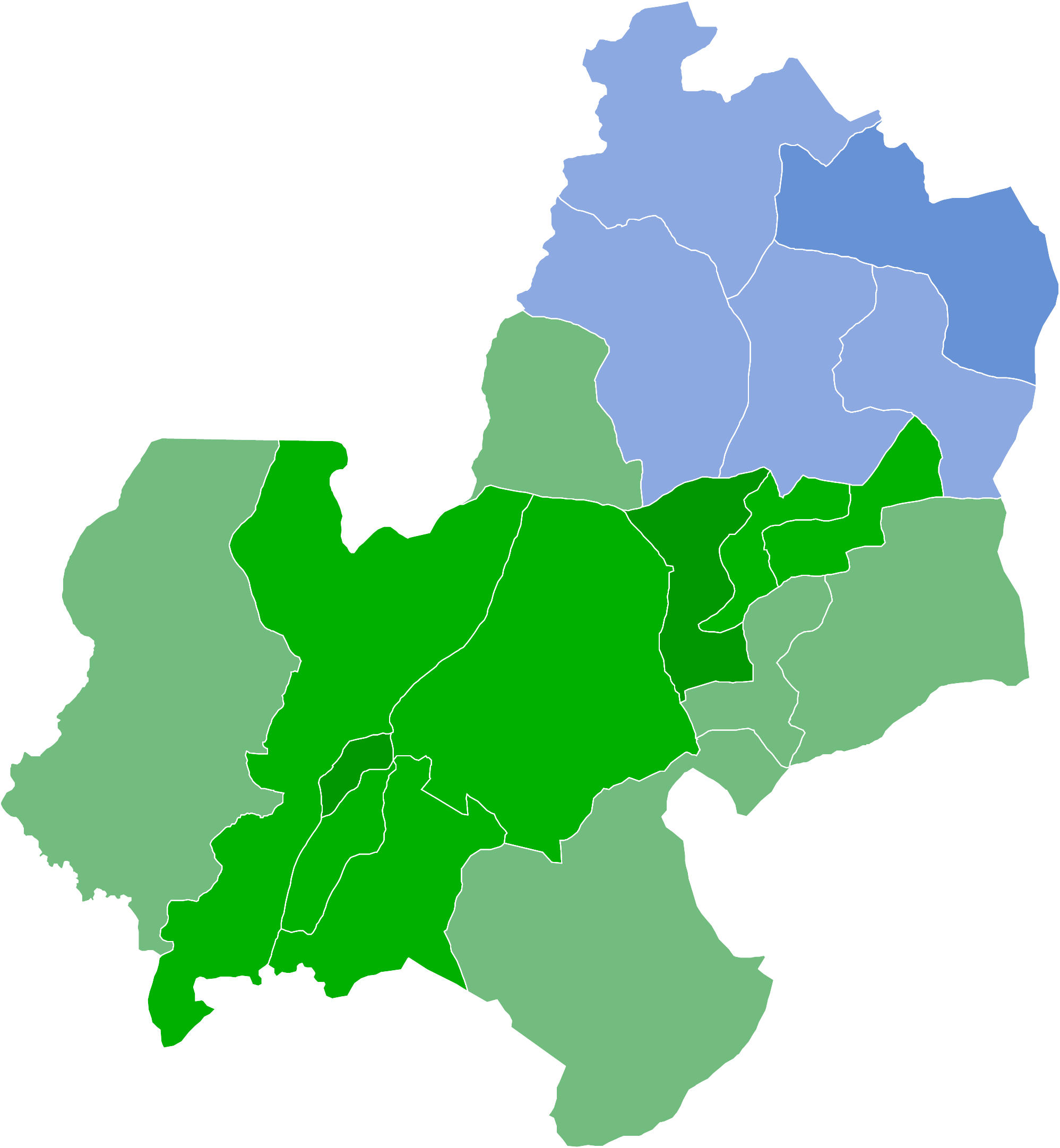
- LGA results Obaseki: 50–60% 60–70% 70–80% Ize-Iyamu: 50–60% 60–70%
Governor before election
Godwin Obaseki
PDP
Elected Governor
Godwin Obaseki
PDP

The 2020 Edo State gubernatorial election was held on 19 September 2020. Incumbent PDP Governor Godwin Obaseki won re-election for a second term, defeating APC Osagie Ize-Iyamu and several minor party candidates. Obaseki received 57.3% of the vote.

Godwin Obaseki emerged unopposed in the PDP gubernatorial primary after all the aspirants stepped down. He picked Philip Shaibu as his running mate.

Osagie Ize-Iyamu was the APC candidate with Audi Ganiyu as his running mate. Mabel Oboh was the ADC candidate. Iboi Lucky Emmanuel stood in for ADP in the polls, while Osifo Uhun-Ekpenma Isaiah represented LP. Fourteen candidates contested in the election, 12 were male, while 2 were female. Two of the deputy governorship candidates were female.

== Electoral system ==
The governor of Edo State is elected using the plurality voting system.

== Primary election ==
=== PDP primary ===
The PDP primary election was held on 25 June 2020. Godwin Obaseki, the incumbent governor emerged unopposed after all the aspirants stepped down for him.

=== Candidates ===
- Party nominee: Godwin Obaseki: Incumbent governor.
- Running mate: Philip Shaibu.
- Kenneth Imasuagbon: Stepped down.
- Gideon Ikhine: Stepped down.
- Omoregie Ogbeide-Ihama: Stepped down.

=== APC primary ===
The APC primary election was held on 22 June 2020. Osagie Ize-Iyamu won the primary election polling 27,833 votes against two other candidates. His closest rival was Pius Odubu, a former deputy governor in the state who came a distant second with 3,776 votes, while Osaze Obazee, a former governor in the state came third with 2,000 votes.

=== Candidates ===
- Party nominee: Osagie Ize-Iyamu.
- Running mate: Audu Ganiyu.
- Pius Odubu: Former deputy governor. Lost in the primary election.
- Osaze Obazee: Former governor. Lost in the primary election.

== Results ==
A total of 14 candidates registered with the Independent National Electoral Commission to contest in the election. PDP Governor Godwin Obaseki won re-election for a second term, defeating APC Osagie Ize-Iyamu and several minor party candidates. Obaseki received 57.3% of the votes, while Ize-Iyamu received 41.6%.

The total number of registered voters in the state was 2,210,534 while 557,443 voters were accredited. Total number of votes cast was 550,242, while number of valid votes was 537,407. Rejected votes were 12,835.

Candidate	Party	Votes	%
Godwin Obaseki	People's Democratic Party	307,955	57.30
Osagie Ize-Iyamu	All Progressives Congress	223,619	41.61
Ibio Lucky Emmanuel	Action Democratic Party	2,374	0.44
Mabel Oboh	African Democratic Congress	1,370	0.25
Stevie Nash Ozono	National Rescue Movement	573	0.11
Felix Izekor Obayangbon	Social Democratic Party	323	0.06
Osifo Uhun-Ekpenma Isaiah	Labour Party	267	0.05
Agol Ebun Tracy	New Nigeria Peoples Party	258	0.05
Lucky Osagie Idehen	All Progressives Grand Alliance	177	0.03
Jones Osagiobare	Young Progressives Party	132	0.02
Jones Osagiobare	Zenith Labour Party	117	0.02
Edemakhiota Godwin Osaimiamia	Action Alliance	107	0.02
Amos Osalumese Areloegbe	Action Peoples Party	78	0.01
Igbineweka Osamuede	Allied Peoples Movement	57	0.01
Total		537,407	100.00
Valid votes		537,407	97.67
Invalid/blank votes		12,835	2.33
Total votes		550,242	100.00
Registered voters/turnout		2,272,058	24.22
Source: INEC, INEC

=== By local government area ===
The results of the election by local government area for the two major parties are shown below. The total valid votes of 537,407 represents the 14 political parties that participated in the election. Green represents LGAs won by Obaseki. Blue represents LGAs won by Ize-Iyamu.

County	Godwin Obaseki PDP		Osagie Ize-Iyamu APC		Total votes
County	#	%	#	%	#
Igueben	7,870	60.2%	5,199	39.8%	13,069
Esan North-East	13,579	67.4%	6,556	32.6%	20,135
Esan Central	10,794	61.6%	6,719	38.4%	17,513
Ikpoba Okha	41,030	69.3%	18,218	30.7%	59,248
Uhunmwonde	10,022	62.7%	5,972	37.3%	15,994
Egor	27,621	73%	10,202	27%	37,823
Owan East	14,762	43.3%	19,295	56.7%	34,057
Owan West	11,485	50.6%	11,193	49.4%	22,678
Ovia North-East	16,987	63.2%	9,907	36.8%	26,894
Etsako West	17,959	40.7%	26,140	59.3%	44,099
Esan South-East	10,563	53.3%	9,237	46.7%	19,800
Oredo	43,498	70.3%	18,365	29.7%	61,863
Esan West	17,434	70.8%	7,189	29.2%	24,623
Akoko Edo	20,101	46.7%	22,963	53.3%	43,064
Etsako East	10,668	38.6%	17,011	61.5%	27,679
Etsako Central	7,478	47.2%	8,359	52.8%	15,837
Orhionmwon	13,445	56.2%	10,458	43.6%	23,903
Ovia South-West	12,659	54.3%	10,636	45.7%	23,295
Totals	307,955	57.3%	223,619	41.6%	537,407
