= Chris Osa Nehikhare =

Nigerian politician

Commissioner for Communication and Orientation, Edo State
- In office November 2022 – November 2024
- Governor: Godwin Obaseki
- Preceded by: Andrew Emwanta
- Succeeded by: Paul Ohonbamu (Information and Communication)

Personal details
- Party: Peoples Democratic Party
- Occupation: Politician, Public Relations Specialist
- Known for: State Publicity Secretary of the Edo State PDP

Chris Osa Nehikhare is a Nigerian politician and public relations officer from Edo State. He served as the Commissioner for Communication and Orientation in Edo State under Governor Godwin Obaseki from November 2022 to November 2024. Prior to his cabinet appointment, he was the Publicity Secretary for the Edo State chapter of the Peoples Democratic Party (PDP).

== Political career ==
=== PDP Publicity Secretary ===
Nehikhare served as the State Publicity Secretary and official spokesperson for the Peoples Democratic Party (PDP) in Edo State. During the 2020 Edo State gubernatorial election, he chaired the Media and Publicity Sub-Committee for the Edo PDP Campaign Council. Following the conclusion of Godwin Obaseki's administration in November 2024, Nehikhare returned to his role as Publicity Secretary for the Edo State PDP.

=== Edo State Commissioner ===
In November 2022, Governor Godwin Obaseki appointed Nehikhare to the Edo State Executive Council as Commissioner for Communication and Orientation. He held the portfolio until November 2024, managing state government communication and public information strategy across executive departments.
