= Rehoming =

Rehoming may refer to:

- Pet adoption
- Child rehoming, or adoption rehoming, a form of child abandonment
