= Chris Ogiemwonyi =

Nigerian politician and businessman

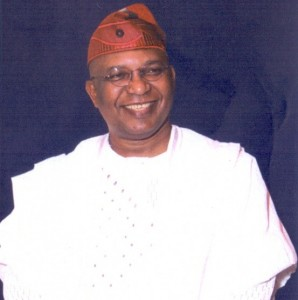

Minister of State for Works
- In office April 2010 – May 2011
- President: Goodluck Jonathan

Personal details
- Born: Christopher Aigbovbiosa Ogiemwonyi; 21 March 1951 (age 75) Benin City, Edo State, Nigeria
- Party: People's Democratic Party; All Progressives Congress
- Occupation: Politician, businessman, petroleum engineer

Engr Christopher Aigbovbiosa Ogiemwonyi (born 21 March 1951) is a Nigerian politician and businessman. He was a former Minister for Works at the Nigeria Federal Ministry of Works. He was the retired group executive director of the Nigerian National Petroleum Corporation. As of January 2020, he is the President of Energy and Engineering Technology Consulting Group. He has held this position since 2011. After defecting from the People's Democratic Party to the All Progressive Congress, he made a bid for governor in the Edo State governorship election, 2016. He received 137 votes in the primary election, coming in fourth. He is married with 5 children.

== Background ==
Ogiemwonyi was born on 21 March 1951 to Mr. and Mrs. Agbonkpolor Ogiemwonyi in Benin City, Edo State, Nigeria. He attended Western Boys School, Benin City before proceeding to the University of Benin in 1969. He graduated in 1974, with a B.Sc. (Hons) in Applied Physics option in Electronics. He later attended the University of Ibadan. In 1976, he received a post-graduate diploma in petroleum engineering.

He is a technocrat with a "father-degree of experience in the oil and gas industry. He's attended several local and international courses. He is an alumnus of the Harvard Business School. He is a member of the Society of Petroleum Engineers. He is also a highly-ranked member of the Nigerian Society of Engineers. He was President of the Nigeria Gas Association from 2006 to 2008.

Ogiemwonyi is a recipient of the Justice of Peace by Edo State Government and Kwame Nkrumah Leadership Award. He is also a patron to several bodies, including the National Association of Nigerian Students and the Association of Community Newspapers Publishers of Nigeria.

== Educational career ==
Ogiemwonyi received his WASSCE certificate in 1969. In 1974 he became a B.Sc. holder in applied physics. His post-graduate diploma in petroleum engineering was received in 1976. He became a Doctor of Engineering Ph.D. (Honoris Causa) and a Doctor of Science Ph.D. (Honoris Causa) in 2008.

Qualification	Year
Doctor of Science, Ph.D. (Honoris Causa)	2008
Doctor of Engineering, Ph.D. (Honoris Causa)	2007
Post-graduate diploma in Petroleum Engineering	1976
B.Sc. (Hons) in Applied Physics	1974
WASSCE	1969

== Professional career ==
=== Petroleum Engineer II ===
Chris Ogiemwonyi began his career as a petroleum engineer at the Conversation Department in 1975. In February 1977 he was transferred to Shell Petroleum Development Company Warri. This transfer was enriched by a four and half month Advance Petroleum Engineering Programme in Shell's Training Centre in the Hague, Netherlands.

=== Exploration & Exploitation – Nigerian National Petroleum Corporation ===
In 1982, Ogiemwonyi resumed work at the Exploration & Exploitation Division of Nigerian National Petroleum Corporation. He was transferred to the National Reserves Evaluation as a project leader in 1985. While in office as a project leader, Ogiemwonyi coordinated all efforts in Dallas, USA by establishing a database for the oil and gas industry.

In 1988, he was moved back to the Exploration Division of Exploration & Exploitation. He was assigned as head of the Petroleum Engineering Department Company to nurture the newly created Petroleum Engineering Department.

=== Petroleum Engineer – Nigerian Petroleum Development Company ===
In 1988, Chris Ogiemwonyi became the project leader (Petroleum Engineer) of the Nigerian Petroleum Development Company in Benin City. The company's main objective was to compete as an indigenous Oil and Gas producing Company. Nigerian Petroleum Development Company was assigned four acreages, including OML – 65, which contained Abura Field. It produced 980 barrels (156 m^{3}) of oil per day.

Ogiemwonyi championed the takeover of the Nigerian Petroleum Development Company and kept an up-to-date reserves position of the company.

He became the field project leader in Abuja, as his company held the majority of assets from the then-defunct Tenneco. Ogiemwonyi raised the production level from 980 barrels (156 m^{3}) of oil per day to over 4,000 barrels (640 m^{3}) of oil per day in 1990. In 1992, he served as project leader for the Oredo Field Project. It was a Greenfield project that involved Kelt Energy, UK and IP Construction, Calgary. It involved the construction of an early production facility that made 10,000 barrels (1,600 m^{3}) of oil per day. It was expanded to process 30 million cubic feet (850 thousand cubic metres) per day at standard conditions.

Ogiemwonyi also served as Oziengbe field Leader. This EPC facility produced 10,000 barrels (1,600 m^{3}) of oil per day at the Oziengbe field.

=== General Manager, Operations – NAPIMS ===
In 1999, Chris Ogiemwonyi was promoted to General Manager and was moved to National Petroleum Investments Management Services (NAPIMS) to oversee the Operations Division. He championed several projects as a general manager, including the Local content initiative of the Federal Government. Due to his service, Ogiemwonyi was appointed as the Group General Manager NAPIMS in 2001.

While serving as the Group General Manager NAPIMS, Ogiemwonyi supervised organizations such as the Joint Ventures and the Production Sharing Companies.

During his time at NAPIMS, Ogiemwonyi served as Chairman of the Nigeria OTC Committee between 2003 and 2004. He also supervised several key projects. This included the EA field, Erha field, Bonga field, and Agbami field projects, amongst others.

During his term, NAPIMS achieved zero cash call arrears by October 2003. As GGM NAPIMS, joint utilization of assets was encouraged for the oil industry. These assets included offshore swamp rigs.

=== Managing Director – Nigerian Petroleum Development Company ===
In November 2003, Ogiemwonyi was reassigned to the Nigerian Petroleum Development Company as managing director. His expertise contributed to the company's production increase from 20,000 to 70,000 barrels (3,200 to 11,000 m^{3}) of oil per day. He served as chairman for the Project Monitoring Committee of Okono/Okpho Development Project, a strategic alliance between Nigerian Petroleum Development Company and Agip Energy Limited. He also served as Chairman for PMC of OMLs 64 and 66 Project, another strategic alliance between the Nigerian Petroleum Development Company and sinopec of China.

=== Managing Director – National Gas Company ===
Ogiemwonyi was reassigned to National Gas Company Limited (NGC) as managing director in March 2005. He was determined to increase gas supply to major customers such as PHCN, SNG, GSLink, WAPCO, Shagamu, Ewekoro, Notore Fertilizer, and Obajana Cement Company. NGC coordinated 130 million cubic feet (3.7 million cubic metres) per day gas supply at standard conditions (WAGP – West Africa gas Supply Project) to Benin, Togo, and Ghana.

TSGP – Trans-Sahara Gas Project, the 2 billion ft^{3} (57 million m^{3}) per day gas supply at standard conditions from Nigeria through Algeria to Europe was another project under his supervision as NGC’s managing director.

=== Group Executive Director – Nigerian National Petroleum Corporation ===
In September 2007, Ogiemwonyi became the Group Executive Director of the Nigerian National Petroleum Corporation (Exploration & Production Directorate).

While he served as GED Exploration and Production, Ogiemwonyi was in charge of seven Nigerian National Petroleum Corporation companies and subsidiaries. These included National Petroleum Investment Management Services, Nigerian Gas Company, LNG & Power Division, Integrated Data Services Limited, Nigerian Petroleum Development Company Crude Oil, Marketing Division and Local Content Division.

=== President – EETCLTD ===
As of 2020, Ogiemwonyi is the President of Energy and Engineering Technology Consulting Group, a position he has occupied since May 2011.

=== President – ESC ===
Between September 2009 to April 2010, Ogiemwonyi served as the President for Energy Strategy Centre Abuja, an Energy and Consulting Group.

== Political career ==
=== Minister of State for Works ===
Under the People's Democratic Party (PDP), Ogiemwonyi was appointed Minister of State for Works in April 2010. He occupied the office till May 2011.

=== Governorship Aspirant ===
In 2014, Ogiemwonyi defected to the All Progressive Congress (APC). He publicly renounced the People's Democratic Party, emphasizing that he would not take back his renouncement. He was declared as the APC's Governorship Aspirant in 2016.
