= Mike Oghiadomhe =

Nigerian politician (born 1955)

Chief Mike Oghiadomhe CFR OFR

Chief of Staff to the President
- In office 17 May 2010 – 10 February 2014
- President: Goodluck Jonathan
- Preceded by: Gbolade Osinowo
- Succeeded by: Jones Arogbofa

Deputy Governor of Edo State
- In office 29 May 1999 – 29 May 2007
- Governor: Lucky Igbinedion
- Succeeded by: Lucky Imasuen

Personal details
- Born: Mike Aiyegbeni Oghiadomhe; 4 September 1955 (age 71) Fugar, Western Region, British Nigeria (now in Edo State, Nigeria)
- Party: Peoples Democratic Party
- Education: University of Ibadan; University of Benin
- Occupation: Politician

Chief Mike Aiyegbeni Oghiadomhe CFR OFR (born 4 September 1955) is a Nigerian politician who served as a presidential Chief of Staff from 2010 to 2014. He previously served as the deputy governor of Edo State from 1999 to 2007.

== Education and career ==
=== Education ===
Oghiadomhe is a 1978 graduate of soil science from the University of Ibadan; a holder of an MBA degree from University of Benin (1982), currently a Doctoral student at the University of Liverpool, United Kingdom. In March 2011, he was awarded an honorary doctorate degree from the Federal University of Technology, Owerri. He is also Honorary Fellow of Auchi Polytechnic and Federal Polytechnic, Offa.

=== Civil service career ===
Between 1979 and 1982, Oghiadomhe had a brief stint with the defunct Bendel State's Ministry of Agriculture as a Research Officer. He joined the private sector in 1982 and became a major player in the solid mineral industry. In recognition of his meritorious role in the industry, he was granted membership of the Nigeria Mining and Geosciences Society of Nigeria.

== Political career ==
In 1998, he went into active politics and was elected unopposed into the House of Representatives under the platform of the United Nigeria Congress Party. Subsequent to the truncation of that transition programme, he was elected Deputy Governor of Edo State alongside Lucky Igbinedion on the platform of the Peoples Democratic Party, PDP and successfully served two terms from 1999 to 2007. In the course of service, he received several awards for his unalloyed loyalty and outstanding performance.

In appreciation of his immense contributions to Edo State, the entire traditional rulers of the State unanimously conferred upon him the title of OLUETSENIGIE of Edo land. He remains the first and only Edo man to hold a collective title of the entire traditional institutions in the State. He is also the Chairman, Board of Trustees of Fugar Progressive Union.

In June 2007, Oghiadomhe was appointed Deputy Chief of Staff to the then Vice President Goodluck Jonathan under the President Yar'Adua administration, a position he held till August 2008, when the position was scrapped. He was then appointed Principal Secretary to Jonathan till May 17, 2010, when he was elevated to become Chief of Staff to Jonathan as president, a position he held up till February, 2014, when he resigned.

Chief Oghiadomhe is currently a member of the Board of Trustees of the Peoples Democratic Party (PDP).

== Controversy ==
When Oghiadomhe resigned in 2014, it was speculated that he had been sacked by President Jonathan as a result of corruption allegations. This rumour was refuted by then presidential spokesman, Reuben Abati who clarified that the outgoing CoS resigned to pursue his political ambitions.

== Personal life ==
Oghiadomhe is married.
