= Gotcha Day =

Anniversary for adoption of a child or pet

"Gotcha Day" is a term for the anniversary of the day on which a person or a pet joins a family by adoption. It is also called "Homecoming Day", "Family Day", or "Adoption Day", although the date may be different from date on which the legal adoption becomes final. Gotcha Day is often associated with annual rituals or celebrations, much like a birthday. The tradition, and especially the word gotcha, is considered offensive by some adoptees.

== History ==
The 2001 book, Primary Care Pediatrics, noted that adoptive family are rarely present for the child's birth and recommended a celebration "an addition to the traditional birthday celebration, that is, the 'gotcha day'." Margaret Schwartz, in her book The Pumpkin Patch, declared September 15, 2005 as International Gotcha Day. Schwartz used the term in reference to her international adoptions where the legal adoption occurred separately to the children physically joining the family. Spectrum Press subsequently endorsed and publicized the movement.

== Rituals ==
Gotcha Day can include cakes and presents like those of a birthday to broader celebration as a means of raising community awareness to normalize adoption. "Gotcha Day" greeting cards are widely available and personalized "Gotcha Day" souvenirs have become a cottage industry. Re-telling the story of the child's arrival, as part of the family legend, is often highlighted. If the child was adopted from another culture, traditional food and music may be incorporated.

Some celebrate with a "happy Gotcha Day" cake or give a small present, like a keepsake for their adopted daughter's charm bracelet. Others go out for a nice dinner, invite friends for an "adoption day" barbecue, or take a special family photo.

== Controversy ==
The arguments for celebrating, especially with international adoptions, include that it is a "firm date in history" whereas exact birthdays and early milestones may be less sure. It also marks the day a family came physically together, separate from the legalities. According to an adoptive parent Amy Ames in a post on Adoptive Families, "'We gotcha' is a phrase that acknowledges when another way of life began. Simply saying 'Adoption Day' does not differentiate between our children's placement and finalization dates, so 'Gotcha Day' is a less confusing name for us."

Arguments against include the opinion that it puts the focus on the adult's experience of events and demeans that of the adoptee. "'Gotcha' for parents means 'lost-ya' for children who have been separated from familiar faces, smells, surroundings." Adoption occurs after loss and abandonment and marking the day of transition can heighten those feelings. Other arguments focus on the word 'gotcha', which can have a 'gloating' tone. Author Karen Moline, a progenitor of the argument against the term, wrote "What does this term imply? We use it when we grab someone who is running from us, or when we save someone from something, or when we're playing a game."

Author and adoptive parent of color Morénike Giwa Onaiwu has emphasized that much of the "controversy" surrounding negative connotations of the term erases the perspectives and experiences of communities of color (adoptees of color and adoptive parents of color) and notes that the alternative phrases are equally problematic.
