= Philip Shaibu =

Nigerian politician (born 1969)

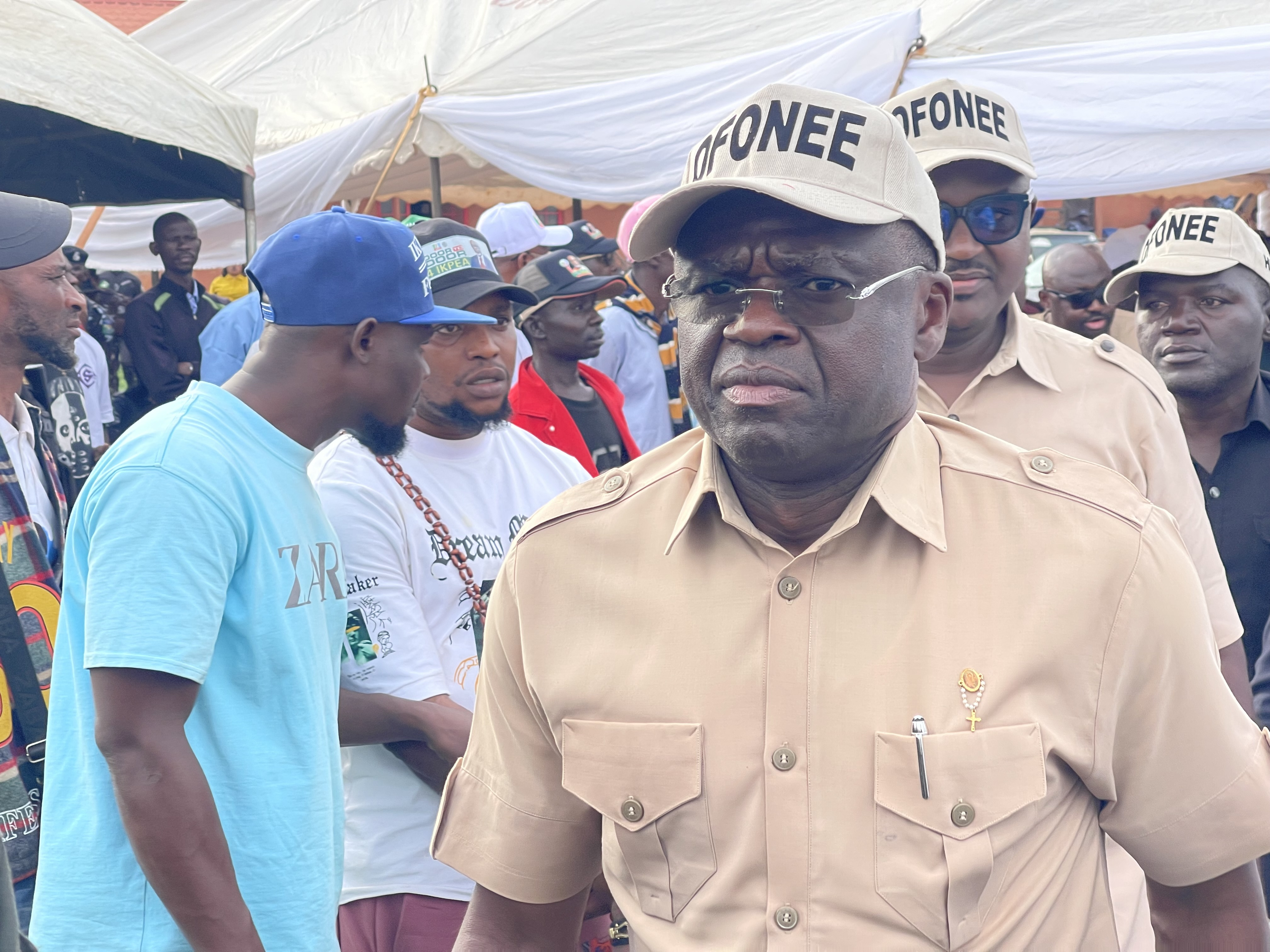

Deputy Governor of Edo State
- In office 17 July 2024 – 12 November 2024; Disputed by Omobayo Godwins
- Governor: Godwin Obaseki
- Preceded by: Omobayo Godwins
- Succeeded by: Dennis Idahosa
- In office 12 November 2016 – 8 April 2024
- Governor: Godwin Obaseki
- Preceded by: Pius Odubu
- Succeeded by: Omobayo Godwins

Member of the House of Representatives of Nigeria from Edo
- In office 9 June 2015 – March 2016
- Preceded by: Abass Braimoh
- Succeeded by: Johnny Oghuma
- Constituency: Etsako Central/West/East

Majority Leader of the Edo State House of Assembly
- In office 22 February 2010 – 2 June 2015
- Preceded by: Frank Okiye
- Succeeded by: Folly Ogedengbe

Member of the Edo State House of Assembly
- In office June 2007 – June 2015
- Constituency: Etsako West

Personal details
- Born: 1 December 1969 (age 56) Kaduna, North-Central State (now Kaduna State), Nigeria
- Party: All Progressives Congress (2013–2020; 2024–present)
- Other political affiliations: All Nigeria Peoples Party (1998–2006); Action Congress of Nigeria (2006–2013); Peoples Democratic Party (2020–2024)
- Spouse: Maryann Shaibu
- Education: University of Jos (BSc); University Of Benin (MBA)
- Occupation: Politician; accountant; activist

Philip Shaibu (born 1 December 1969) is a Nigerian accountant and politician who served as the deputy governor of Edo State from 2016 until his impeachment in 2024. He was reinstated by the Federal High Court, Abuja on Wednesday, 17 July 2024. He previously served as a member of the Federal House of Representatives representing Etsako from 2015 to 2016, and as a member of the Edo State House of Assembly from 2007 to 2015.

== Personal life and education ==
=== Early childhood ===
Shaibu was born in Kaduna to a Christian family. His father was late Pastor Francis Osikpomobo Shaibu and his mother was Lucy Momoh. He was raised with strong Christian virtues.

=== Education ===
He had his early education at St. Augustine Primary School, Tundu Wada Kaduna but finished at L.E.A Primary School Barnawa, Kaduna State where he obtained the First School Leaving Certificate, Shaibu subsequently earned his West African Senior School Certificate in 1989 after attending Saudana Memorial Secondary School, Kawo Kaduna. Comrade Shaibu received a Bachelor of Science degree (Honours) in Accounting from the University of Jos in 2000, where he was the President of the National Association of Nigerian Students (NANS) between 2000 and 2001 and a master of Business Administration (MBA) from University of Benin in 2015.

=== Family life ===
He is married to Mrs. Maryann Philip-Shaibu and has children.

== Private career ==
After he left school he started working with the Nigerian Prisons Service, Abuja but voluntarily retired as an Assistant Inspector of Prisons in 2002 so he can venture into full politics.

== Political career ==
Shaibu first ventured into politics in 2003 when he contested elections into the Edo State House of Assembly under the platform of the All Nigeria Peoples Party (ANPP) but lost.

Shaibu once again in 2007 contested and won the election to represent the Etsako West Constituency under the platform of the Action Congress (AC) at the Edo State House of Assembly. While he was at the House of Assembly, he was elected as the majority leader on 24 February 2010 after Rt. Hon. Zakawanu Garuba was impeached as the Speaker of the Edo state House of Assembly.

In 2015, after spending eight years at the Edo state House of Assembly, he contested and won the Etsako Federal constituency House of Representatives seat and beat his closest rival Abbas Braimah of the Peoples Democratic party with a poll of 42,079 votes against Braimah's 29,941 votes to clinch the representative seat.

He was unanimously announced as the running mate to Godwin Obaseki in the 2016 Edo State gubernatorial election and the duo eventually won the election and was sworn in on 12 November 2016.

On 16 June 2020, Shaibu, alongside Governor Obaseki, resigned his membership from the All Progressives Congress and decamped to the Peoples Democratic Party. In a joint ticket with Governor Godwin Obaseki, Shaibu contested and won the 2020 Edo State gubernatorial election under the platform of the Peoples Democratic Party (PDP).

Shaibu indicated interest to succeed Obaseki in 2024, in a bid to achieve his ambition, he fell out with Obaseki which led to impeachment in April 2024, and defection to the All Progressives Congress (APC) on 20 July 2024 in Benin City. On 24 May 2025, he was appointed as the Director-General of the National Institute For Sports (NIS) by President Bola Tinubu.
