= Dennis Idahosa =

Nigerian politician (born 1980)

His Excellency Dennis Idahosa
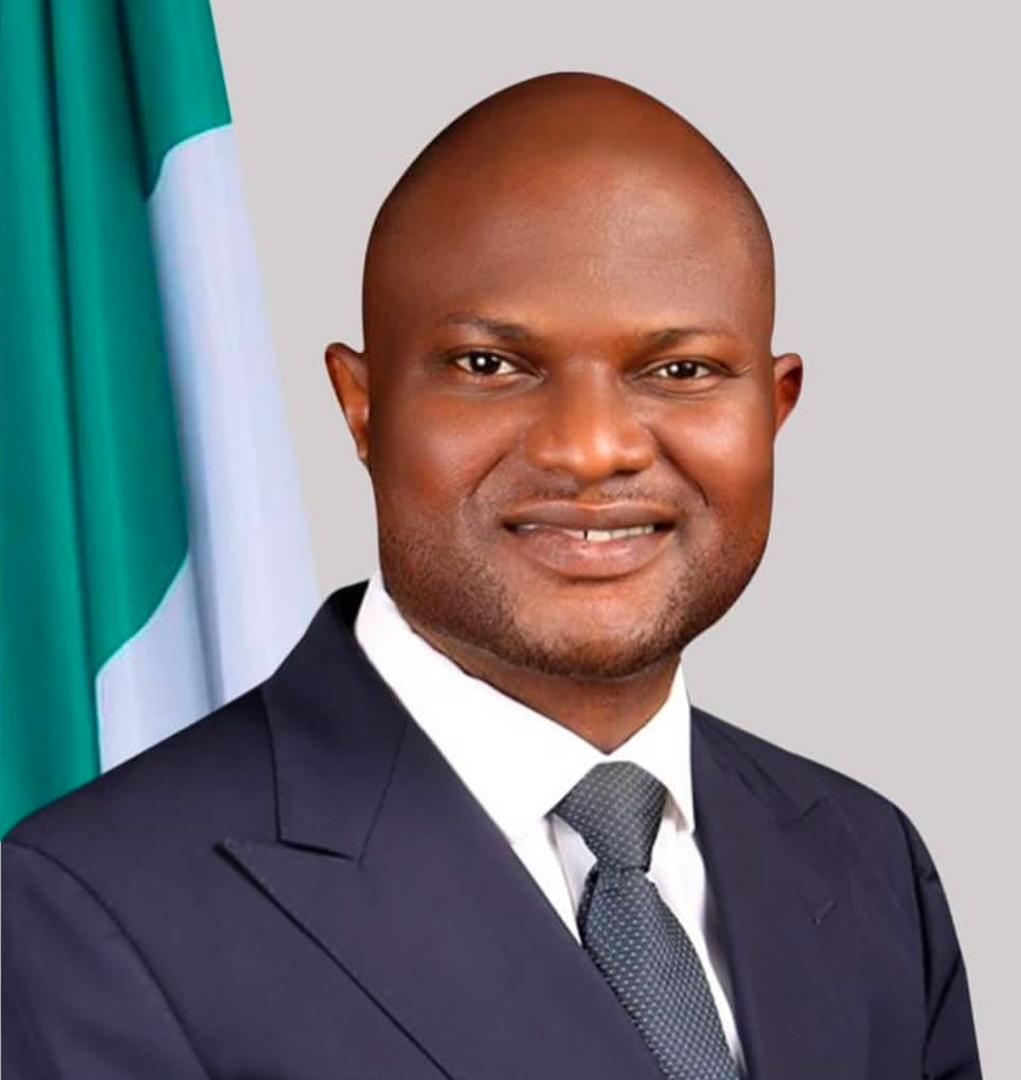

Deputy Governor of Edo State
- Incumbent
- Assumed office 12 November 2024
- Governor: Monday Okpebholo
- Preceded by: Omobayo Godwins; Philip Shaibu

Member of the House of Representatives of Nigeria from Edo
- In office 12 June 2019 – 12 November 2024
- Preceded by: Omosede G. Igbinedion
- Constituency: Ovia North-East/Ovia South-West

Chairman of the House Committee on Legislative Compliance
- In office June 2019 – June 2023

Edo State Commissioner of Investments and Public-Private Partnerships
- In office 2014–2015

Personal details
- Born: 11 August 1980 (age 46) Ovia South-West, Bendel State (now in Edo State), Nigeria
- Party: All Progressives Congress
- Education: BSc Sociology and Master Degrees in Legislative Studies
- Occupation: Politician

Dennis Idahosa (born 11 August 1980) is a Nigerian politician who has served as deputy governor of Edo State since 12 November 2024. He previously served as a member of the House of Representatives of Nigeria from 2019 to 2024.

== Early life and education ==
Dennis Idahosa was born on 11 August 1980, in Benin City, Edo State. He earned a degree in sociology and a masters in Legislative Studies in Canada and Nigeria, respectively.

== Career ==
He worked in private sector health and allied sectors before joining politics. He was appointed as a commissioner of, the Edo State Ministry of Investments, Public-Private Partnerships (2014–2015) by the administration of Adams Oshiomhole. He was a member of the National Agency of the Great Green Wall, Abuja, from March 2018 to November 2018.

In 2019, he was elected to the House of Representatives and reelected in 2023 for a second term in office defeating Omosede Igbinedion.

On 22 September 2024, he was declared the deputy governor-elect in the gubernatorial elections.

== Awards and Honours ==
- African illustrious Award - Political Icon of the Year (2025)
