= John Yakubu =

Nigerian politician

John Yakubu is a former chairman of Esan North-East local government area. He was the running mate of Osagie Ize-Iyamu, the People's Democratic Party nominee in the 2016 Edo State gubernatorial election.
