= Idia Ize-Iyamu =

Idia Nibokun Ize-Iyamu
- Education: University of Lagos; University of Benin
- Occupations: Orthodontist, professor
- Employer(s): University of Benin; University of Benin Teaching Hospital
- Title: Chief Medical Director of UBTH
- Term: 18 August 2025 – present
- Predecessor: Darlington Obaseki
- Spouse: Osagie Ize-Iyamu

Idia Nibokun Ize-Iyamu is a Nigerian professor of dentistry and orthodontics, academic administrator, and public health scholar. In August 2025, she was appointed Chief Medical Director (CMD) of the University of Benin Teaching Hospital (UBTH), becoming the first female and first dentist to lead the hospital in its history.

== Education ==
Ize-Iyamu attended Corona School in Ikoyi and Queen's College in Yaba, Lagos. She studied dentistry at the College of Medicine, University of Lagos, graduating with a Bachelor of Dental Surgery (BDS). She completed her medical internship at the Lagos University Teaching Hospital (LUTH) between 1992 and 1993. She later undertook postgraduate clinical training at the University of Benin Teaching Hospital (UBTH), obtaining a Fellowship from the West African College of Surgeons (FWACS) in Orthodontics. In 2016, she completed a Commonwealth Medical Fellowship at the University of Oxford.

== Career ==
Ize-Iyamu joined the faculty of the Department of Preventive Dentistry at the University of Benin, where she rose to become a full Professor of Orthodontics. Her clinical research focuses on orthodontics, craniofacial development, and oral health policy. She previously served as Head of the Department of Preventive Dentistry and as Dean of the School of Dentistry at the university. In September 2025, she was elected as the 10th National President of the Nigerian Association of Orthodontists (NAO).

In August 2025, the Federal Government appointed her as Chief Medical Director of UBTH to succeed Darlington Obaseki. She officially assumed office on 18 August 2025.

== Personal life ==
She is married to Osagie Ize-Iyamu, a politician and former Secretary to the Edo State Government. They have children.
