= Pet adoption =

Acquiring and caring for a homeless or shelter animal

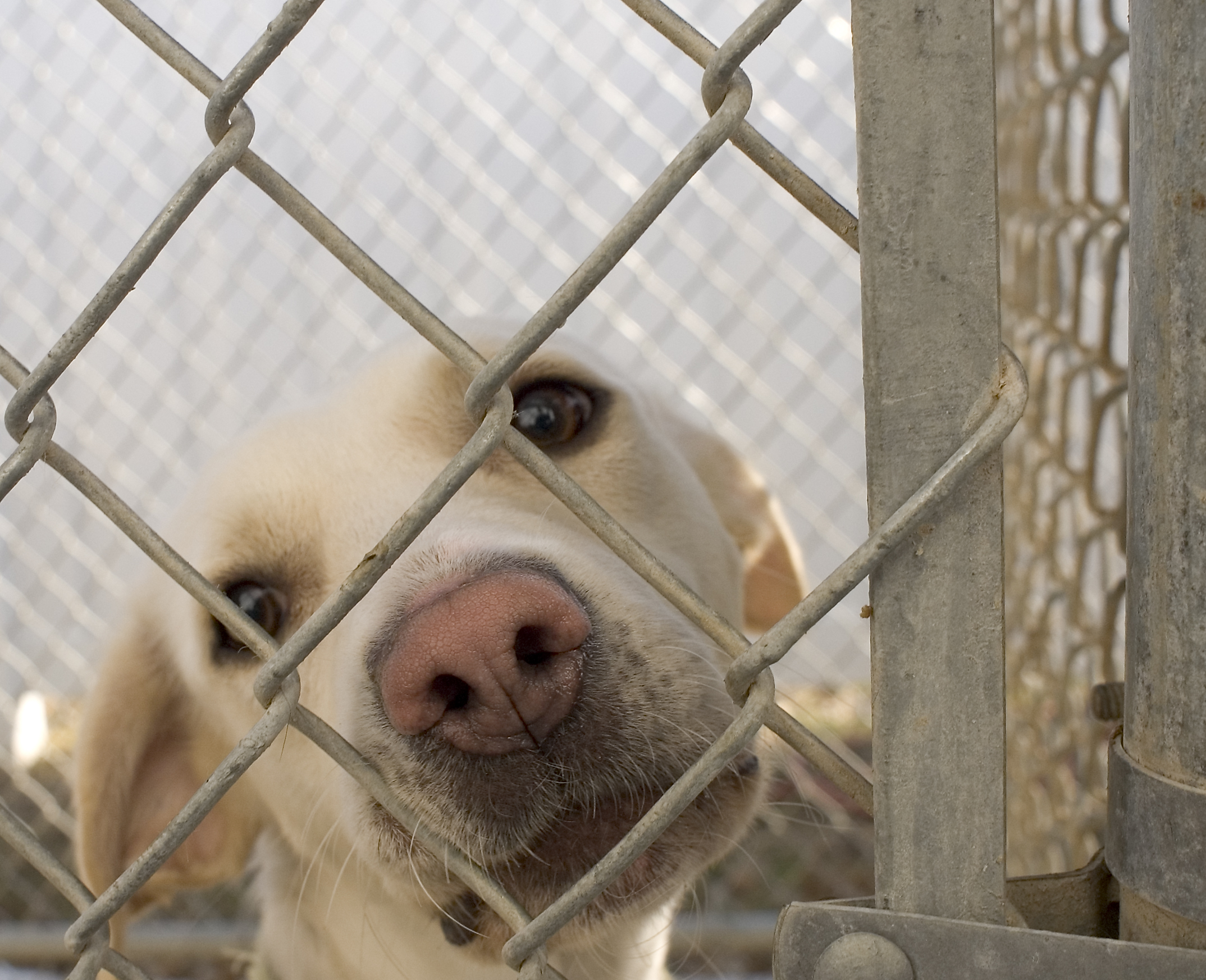
A dog at an animal shelter

Pet adoption is one way to provide a home for animals in need, which is different from purchasing a pet from a breeder or pet store. Common sources for adoptable pets are animal shelters, rescue groups, or other pet owners.

Animals are placed up for adoption for numerous reasons, like being abandoned, lost, or rehomed from their current family. The need for rehoming sometimes results from allergies, death of a pet-owner, divorce, the birth of a baby, or relocation. After medical examinations, treatments, and behavioural tests, adoption centres (at their discretion) determine if the pet is healthy enough for adoption.

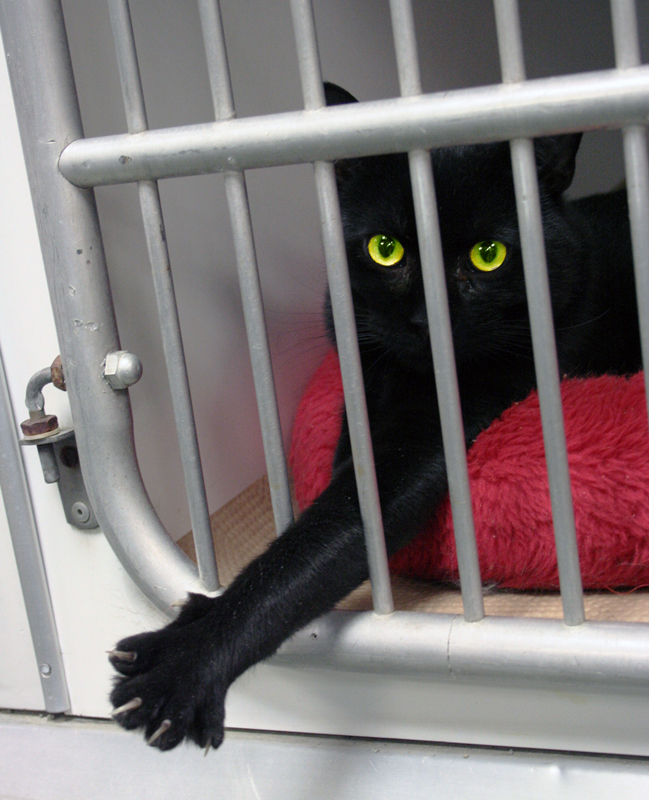
A black cat waiting to be adopted. Because of the superstitions surrounding black cats, they are disproportionately more common in shelters than in the general population and less likely to be adopted than are cats of other colors.

== Euthanasia and “No Kill” Shelters ==
Euthanasia (also known as putting down or putting to sleep) is another method that has been used when dealing with animals who may suffer from terminal illnesses, injuries, or overpopulation in shelters. Although many veterinarians do not consider this to be an ethical use of their resources for young and healthy animals, others argue that euthanasia is a more humane option than leaving a pet in a cage for very long periods of time.

Homes cannot always be found, however, and euthanasia is often used for the excess animals to make room for newer pets unless the organization has a no-kill policy. The Humane Society of the United States estimates that 2.4 million healthy, adoptable cats and dogs are euthanized each year in the US because of a lack of homes. Animal protection advocates campaign for adoption instead of buying animals in order to reduce the number of animals who have to be euthanized. Many shelters and animal rescues encourage the training of spaying or neutering a pet in order to reduce the number of animals euthanized in shelters and to help control the pet population.

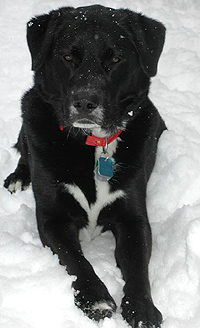
A rescued BBD (Big Black Dog) from Atlantic Canada

To help lower the number of animals euthanized each year, some shelters have developed a no-kill policy. Best Friends Animal Society is the largest no-kill shelter in the United States which adopts policies such as "Save Them All". This shelter and many others strive to keep their animals as long as it takes to find them new homes. City shelters and government-funded shelters rarely have this policy because of the large number of animals they receive.

No-kill shelters are usually run by groups that have volunteers or individuals with enough space to foster pets until a permanent home can be found. However, many of these groups and individuals have a finite number of spaces available. This means they will not take in new animals unless a space opens up, although they will often take back pets that they have adopted out previously. Sometimes they try to find foster homes where the animal can be placed temporarily until someone adopts it.

Physical appearance, behaviour, and health of the animal play crucial roles in the pet adoption decision-making process, with many adopters prioritizing appearance over health. Social influences, such as breed popularity trends, and demographic factors, including household size and the presence of children, significantly affect the likelihood of pet ownership. Additionally, prior experience with dogs is a strong predictor of future dog adoption. Understanding these factors can help develop strategies to encourage responsible adoption practices and reduce the rates of cat and dog relinquishment to shelters.

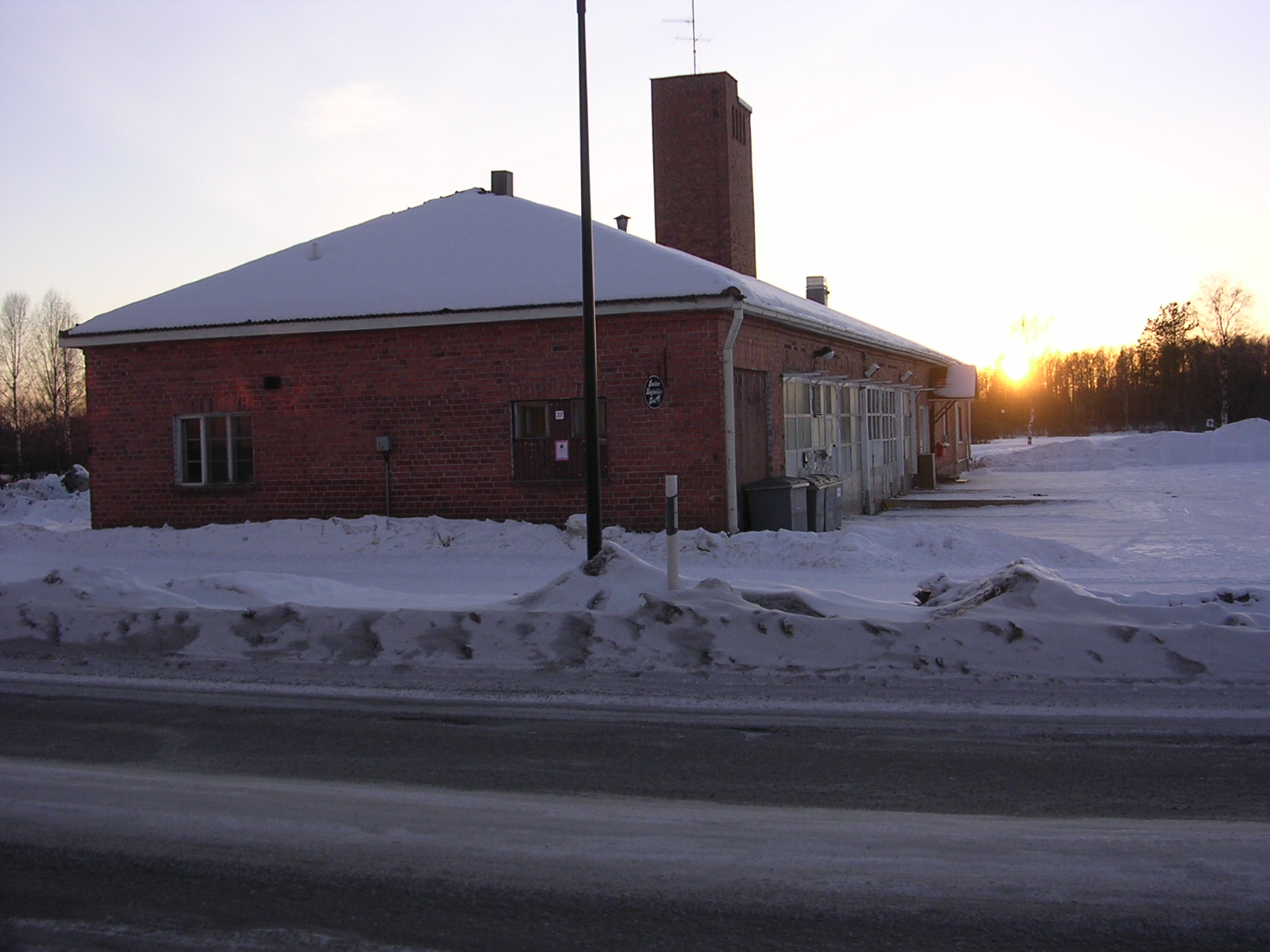
Animal shelter for found animals in Raahe, Finland

== Adoption process ==
Online pet adoption sites have databases, searchable by the public, of pets being housed by thousands of animal shelters and rescue groups.

Some organizations give adopters ownership of the pet, while others use a guardianship model wherein the organization retains some control over the animal's future use or care.

The central issue in adoption is whether the new adopter can provide a safe, secure, and permanent home for the adopted pet. Shelters, pounds, and rescue organizations can refuse to supply pets to people whom they deem unable to provide a suitable home. A new owner may face training or behavioral challenges with a pet who has been neglected, abused, or left untrained. Adoption centres recommend patience, training, persistence, and consistency of care to help the pet overcome its past and get comfortable with the adopter.

In Canada, reputable animal shelters or humane societies go through an extensive process to ensure that potential pets and their respective families are well-suited and prepared for their lives ahead. Adoption fees include spaying/neutering, veterinary care including all updated vaccinations, microchipping, and pet insurance. Phone interviews, written questionnaires, and in-person visits gather information on the potential family's history with pets, their lifestyle, habits, and their ability to take on the conditions of the adopted pet. Adult pets can be more difficult to place because of existing habits or behaviors that are difficult to manage or unwanted. A rescue pet's unknown history may also complicate its ability to be adopted. Shelters and humane societies remain connected with information packages on why pets are unwanted, what to expect in the first weeks of pet adoption, guides, recommendations, specific behavior training requests, and follow-up calls to ensure that everyone is satisfied with the adoption.

A "forever home" is the home of an adopter who agrees to be responsible for the animal for the remainder of the pet's life. There are two basic understandings of the concept. A broad interpretation simply says that the adopter of the pet agrees that the animal's well-being is now their personal responsibility for the rest of the animal's life. If the adopter can no longer keep the animal for any reason, they would need to be responsible for finding a healthy and happy home for the animal. Many animal shelters require adopters to return the animal to the shelter if they can no longer care for the animal.

The adopter should have a plan in place for the care of the animal in the event of the adopter dying before the pet. A more restrictive view that some shelters attempt to integrate as part of the adoption agreement puts conditions on when and why the adopter could arrange to move the animal to a new family. Some agreements might specify allergies or violent behavior on the part of the animal as reasons allowable for an adopter to relinquish the animal. It is common for families to celebrate Gotcha Day on the anniversary of the animal's arrival at their forever home.

Education about and promotion of pet adoption is also done by animal welfare organizations and by local government animal control agencies. In 2016, the U.S. state of Georgia made the "adoptable dog" its state dog, similar to Colorado's adopted dog.

After filling out an application to adopt an animal, there is also an adoption fee that must be paid to adopt an animal. Adoption fees serve several purposes. If someone is willing to pay for an animal, chances are they will take care of him or her and not abuse or neglect their new pet. Most animals of age are spayed or neutered and up to date on all of their shots. Depending on the shelter or organization, some pets may be microchipped, which helps locate them if they are lost. The adoption fees help cover these costs and also help provide food for the animals left in the shelter.

== Pet ownership ==
According to the American Veterinary Medical Association (AVMA, 2018), being responsible for a pet requires commitment and should be considered a privilege. Similar to having children, the pet depends on the owner for their needs such as food and shelter, exercise and mental stimulation, and veterinary care. When choosing to adopt a pet, the lifestyle of the owner and the pet are recommended to be compatible. Once a pet is chosen, the owner is recommended to identify if the pet needs medical attention like being spayed or neutered. If a situation arises that the owner can no longer provide a suitable household for the animal, rehoming is recommended. The AVMA presents guidelines for being a responsible pet owner. This guideline is a resource of things to consider before becoming a pet owner.

== Statistics about Adoption ==
=== United states ===
- United States (first half of 2025): 2.8 million dogs and cats entered shelters (–4 % vs. 2024), 1.9 million adopted (–1 %)
- 2023 totals: 4.8 million adoptions; adoption rate rose from 56 % in 2019 to 61 % in 2023
- 2024: 4.19 million adoptions, still 5.6 % below pre-pandemic levels

According to the American Society for the Prevention of Cruelty to Animals, about 5.8 million pets entered shelters and rescues in 2024; only a little over 4 million are adopted.

== Dog adoption ==
=== Rescue dog ===
A rescue dog is a dog that has been placed in a new home after being abused, neglected, or abandoned by its previous owner.

Many animal rescue organisations exist to rescue, care for and re-home dogs and protect them from unnecessary euthanasia. Common examples include the RSPCA in the United Kingdom and other Commonwealth countries, the ISPCA in Ireland, or the ASPCA in the United States. Many rescue dogs are rehomed quickly, but some wait longer for a home. This may be relevant when the dog is older. Some agencies provide ongoing health care and support for older dogs after they have been placed in a home. There are several charities dedicated to rescuing and rehoming older dogs.

The ASPCA estimates that approximately 3.3 million dogs in the United States enter shelters each year. Of these, 1.6 million are adopted, 670,000 are euthanized, and 620,000 are returned to their previous owners. A study conducted by the United States National Council on Pet Population Study and Policy (NCPPSP) in 1998 found that the main reasons for pets being relinquished are: family moving, landlord will not allow pets, too many animals in household, cost of keeping the pet, owner is having personal problems, inadequate facilities, and no homes available for puppies. The study found that 47.7% of dogs turned in to shelters were not altered (spayed or neutered), 33% had not been to a veterinarian, and 96% of dogs had no obedience training. The conclusion of the researchers was that the owners who were relinquishing their pets did not have the knowledge to be responsible dog owners, and that educational programs aimed at present and prospective owners would reduce the number of dogs relinquished to animal shelters.

=== Causes of dogs' arrival in shelters ===
Dogs may arrive in animal shelters when surrendered by their owners, as strays, or when confiscated due to animal cruelty; they may also be re-relinquished after adoption. Stray dogs may be reclaimed by their original owners and be reunited with them. Owners surrender their dog for a variety of reasons, including relationship breakdowns, moving to a home where the owner is unable or unwilling to take their pets, or health issues, for example elderly people who are not permitted to take their dog(s) into a nursing home. Most of the time, the issue is related to the owner (e.g. housing issues, financial issues, or personal issues) and not the dog. Problems related to the dog can include behavioral issues such as house soiling, fear, destruction, hyperactivity, escaping, disobedience or aggression. Depending on the country, 15% to 50% of adopted dogs are returned to the shelter. Owners of adopted dogs surrender for reasons similar to owners of non-adopted dogs.

Several interventions may prevent dog abandonment. The use of an identification microchip or tag with up-to-date information helps return lost stray animals to their owner more effectively. Providing subsidised dog healthcare may help owners experiencing behavioral issues with their dog or having financial issues. Access to dog training content or classes may also help in reducing behaviour problems, and may improve rates of retention. The availability of pet-friendly housing solutions could reduce housing-related relinquishment.

=== Dog adoption success factors ===
Breed, age, and size of dogs are the main factors influencing adoption in shelters and it seem to be consistent across countries. The influence of the other factors varies, either because of cultural differences across regions or because different methods are used in different places to study them.

==== Dog temperament and behavior ====
When interacting with dogs at the shelter, adopter appear to prefer dog who are calm, friendly, playfull and pay attention to them. They avoid dogs who are too active or inattentive. Some studies have tried to establish if object enrichement (giving kennel dogs beds, food toys or other toys) or sensory enrichement (exposing dogs to certain odours, music or human voice recordings) can help modifying shelter dog behaviour to make them more appealing to adoptants but results are not conclusive.

Social enrichment seem to have better outcomes. Dogs are a social specie and benefit from contacts with their conspecifics (other dogs). Group housing (rather than individual kennels) reduces repetitive behavior (e.g. pacing, circling) or problematic behaviors (e.g. fear, aggression). By improving dog welfare and decreasing abnormal behaviors, contacts with other dogs can improve adoption rates and the satisfaction of adoptants. Dog play groups or visual social contact with other dogs can also have positive effects on dogs.

Some Dog Rehoming Programs tried to implement behavioral assessments to in order to predict possible behavioral issues after adoption.

==== Adoption process ====
Some adoption programs give adoptants the possibility to spend the day with their prospective dog priori to adoption, other put foster families in charge of placing dogs in adoptive home. These program can help reduce return rates of adopted dogs by giving adoptants more time to make their decision and more opportunities to spend time with the dog outside of the shelter.

==== Information on the dog ====
Potential adopters can be sensitive to how a dog is presented. Adopters seem to avoid dogs labelled as strays or labelled as certain breed (e.g. pit-bull) independently of the dog appearance. Some shelters create new breed names to improve the desirability of mixed breed dogs, for example "Shaggy Shepherd Dachspaniel" in Costa Rica or Royal Bourbon, a type of dog named after the Réunion island from which it originates.

==== Dog environment ====
Some researchers investigated if the appearance of the dogs environment (clean kennels, presence of toys, decorations in the shelter, dog pictures taken outdoor...) had an effect but these factors did not seem to influence adoption rates when other factors are taken into account.

==== Dog morphology ====
Dogs morphology and appearance seem to be the most important factor explaining adoption success. Adopters tend to prefer small, young, light-coloured dogs, as well as certain breed such as toy breed. Dogs with paedomorphic (juvenile) features seem also more likely to be adopted.

===== Big Black Dog syndrome and related concerns =====
"Black Dog Syndrome (BDS) or Big Black Dog Syndrome (BBDS) is defined as “the extreme under-adoption of large black dogs based not on temperament or health, but rather on the confluence of a number of physical and environmental factors in conjunction with the Western symbolism of the color black.” "BBD was coined after reports from several animal shelters showed that black dogs are less likely to be adopted and are more likely to be euthanized, compared with lighter-colored dogs."

Historically, there are negative associations around black animals, but there are many biases associated with particular breeds and lineages of dogs that also lead to bias and higher euthanasia rates. Some studies have suggested that: "BDB is a product of the social cognition phenomena known as 'base rate fallacy': black dogs are only more common in shelters because there are more of them (the dark color gene is dominant)."

A 2016 study in Kentucky found that "the significant interaction between breed size and coat shade did not support the purported BBDS: big dogs had similar outcomes regardless of color, and among smaller dogs, black dogs had worse outcomes than non-black counterparts." A 2024 study by Kulak found that: "The existence of BDB is inconsistent across empirical and anecdotal literature (e.g., Goleman et al., 2014). Our research supports that BDB might not be entirely founded; rather, BDB might be a product of base rate fallacy or other factors entirely." "Examining a large municipal animal shelter with a large number of dog and cat data, color and coat pattern were implicated in adoption rates, with more light-colored animals adopted and fewer euthanized than their dark-colored and patterned counterparts. "Wells and Hepper (1992) reported that potential adopters at an animal shelter in Northern Ireland preferred photographs of dogs with blonde over black coats, but when compared with actual purchase records, the color provided no significant impact on purchase." "[A] study on dogs held at two no-kill shelters in New York State found that color was not implicated in length of stay." "[S]ome research found no evidence for BDB (Trevathan-Minnis et al., 2021), instead determining that purebred status and size matter more."

== See also ==
- Greyhound adoption
- International Dog Day
