= Black dog syndrome =

Alleged animal adoption phenomenon

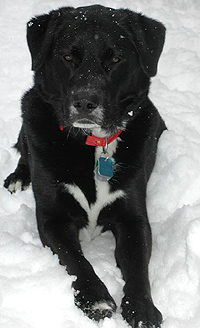
A rescued BBD (Big Black Dog) from Atlantic Canada

Black dog syndrome or big black dog syndrome is a phenomenon in which black dogs are passed over for adoption in favor of lighter-colored animals. Black cats are similarly reported to be subject to the same phenomenon.

While earlier studies found evidence for a lower adoption rate for black dogs, other studies found that they are adopted more quickly than dogs with lighter coat colors. This has led some experts to dismiss black dog syndrome as a 'myth'.

== Theories ==
Initial research at one location identified a longer period experienced by black dogs before adoption, but subsequent studies considered to be more robust (as conducted in a larger number of geographically spread shelters) have shown that when shelter visitors video-recorded their walk through the adoption area, they spent equal amounts of time looking at every dog, regardless of coat color. Other studies have suggested brindle dogs may be more likely to experience longer delays before adoption than black dogs. Coat color bias seems evident, but may change depending on geographic location.

Some people believe that during the pet adoption process, potential owners associate the color black with evil or misfortune (similar to the common superstition surrounding black cats), and this bias transfers over to their choice of dog. Additionally, many shelters feature photo profiles of their dogs on the shelter website. Because black dogs do not photograph well, lighter-colored dogs have an advantage with potential adopters browsing the site. A study done by the Los Angeles Animal Services challenges some of these claims, saying that a full 28% of adopted dogs are black.

However, appearance, in general, does play a role in potential adopters' selection of shelter dogs. In a 2011 study by the ASPCA, appearance was the most frequently cited reason for adopters of both puppies (29 percent) and adult dogs (26 percent).

== History ==
The issue has been gaining media attention since the mid-2000s. Tamara Delaney, an early activist against black dog syndrome, developed a website called Black Pearl Dogs in 2004 to address the issue by educating the public about its existence and showcasing individual dogs available for adoption.

== Scientific studies ==
While many shelter workers claim the phenomenon is real, its acceptance is disputed, and quantitative analyses are limited.

=== Shelter studies ===
A 1992 article in the journal Animal Welfare, found that color was not a major factor in adoptions at a Northern Ireland shelter; black-and-white coats were most prevalent among adopted dogs, followed by yellow, solid black, gold, and black-and-tan coats.

In 2008, the general manager of the Los Angeles Animal Services Department reported that twelve months of data on the intake of 30,046 dogs showed that slightly more black dogs were adopted than non-black dogs.

A 2013 study of dogs' length of stay (LOS) at two New York "no-kill" shelters determined that canine coat color had no effect. The study noted that coat color's effect on LOS may be localized or not generalize to traditional or other types of shelters.

A Masters thesis analysis of 16,800 dogs at two Pacific Northwest shelters found that black dogs were adopted more quickly than average at both shelters.

According to a 2016 study published in Animal Welfare, black dogs were actually more likely to be adopted than dogs with lighter coat colours. This casts doubt on the existence of black dog syndrome, and author Christy Hoffman suggests that other breeds (such as pit bulls and other bully dogs) are more likely to be overlooked than black dogs.

=== Studies based on images ===
A 2012 report in the journal Society and Animals on a pair of studies recording participant rankings of pictured dogs of varying attributes along eight different personality traits did not find a bias against black dogs. In the first study, using four types of poodles (large black, small black, large white, and small white), 795 participants ranked black poodles as more friendly than white poodles. A second study with eight different breeds, including a black lab, suggested that the personality ratings of participants were based more on stereotypes of the breed than on color. It concluded that "in general, except the golden retriever, black labs were perceived as consistently less dominant and less hostile than other large breeds, contrary to the assumption that large, black dogs are viewed negatively.

A 2013 study published in the journal Anthrozoös displayed photographs of dogs colored either yellow or black, and with floppy ears or pointy ears. It found that "participants rated the yellow dog significantly higher than the black dog on the personality dimensions of Agreeableness, Conscientiousness, and Emotional Stability." It also found significant differences in ratings based on ear size, indicating "that people attribute different personality characteristics to dogs based solely on physical characteristics of the dog."

== See also ==
- Pet adoption
- Black cat#Adoption and Black Cat Day
- List of cognitive biases
