= Egedege N'Okaro =

First storey building in Benin City, Nigeria

Coordinates: 6°19′52″N 5°37′52″E

Egedege N'Okaro is the first storey building in Benin Kingdom and in the whole of the Mid-Western Region, Nigeria which is the present day Edo and Delta States. It was built in 1906 by Late Chief Iyamu, the Inneh of Benin Kingdom, Late Chief Iyamu is the great grandfather of Osagie Ize-Iyamu.

According to historical accounts, Egedege N’Okaro was the first residential one-storey structure to be built in the ancient city of Benin. It is made of red furnace-fired bricks with wooden decking. The design of the building was given to Chief Iyamu by a Briton, Mr. Crawe Reade, a colonial officer who supervised its construction.

Egedege N'Okaro structure still stands firmly and majestically as House Number 30, Erie Street, off Sakponba Road, Benin City.
