= International Dog Day =

Annual celebration on 26 August

- Observed by: International
- Date: 26 August
- Next time: 26 August 2027
- Frequency: Annual

International Dog Day or National Dog Day is an annual observance held on August 26 to celebrate dogs of all breeds and backgrounds, promote dog adoption, and raise awareness about the welfare of dogs around the world. It also recognizes working dogs and the roles they play in human society, including service, police, military, and search and rescue dogs.

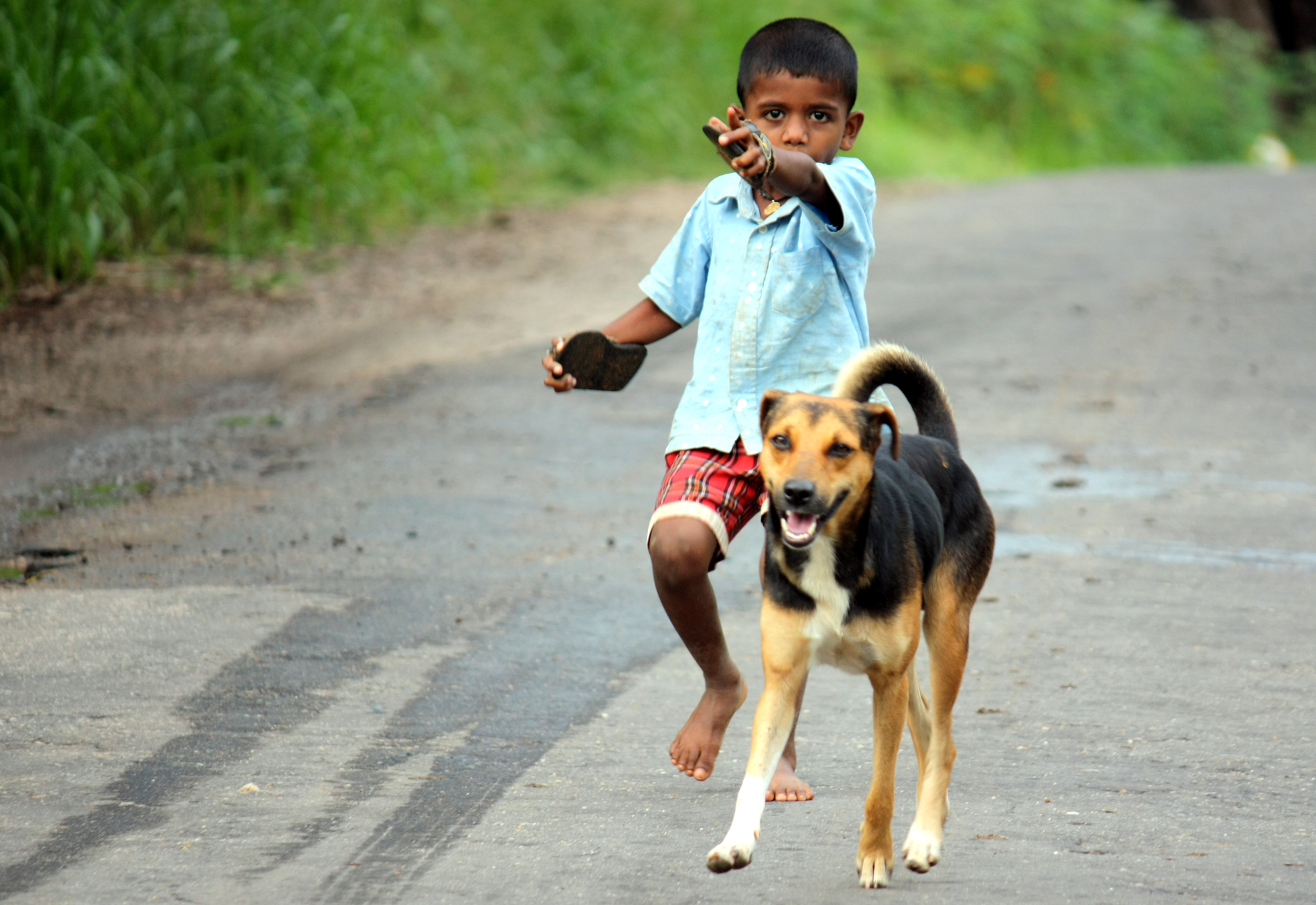
A boy and a dog

== History ==
International Dog Day was founded in 2004 by Colleen Paige, an American animal welfare advocate and pet lifestyle expert. The date, August 26, was chosen to mark the day her family adopted their first dog from a local animal shelter when she was 10 years old.

Initially celebrated in the United States, the observance has since gained global attention, with people and organizations in various countries participating in dog-focused events and awareness campaigns.

== Purpose and objectives ==
The goals of International Dog Day include:

- Promoting adoption of dogs from shelters and rescue centers.
- Raising awareness about the conditions of stray and abandoned dogs.
- Celebrating the companionship, loyalty, and service dogs provide to humans.
- Acknowledging the work of service dogs, therapy dogs, working dogs, and search and rescue dogs.
- Encouraging responsible pet ownership and supporting animal welfare legislation.

== Observance ==
International Dog Day is marked by various activities around the world, including:

- Adoption drives and animal rescue events.
- Fundraising campaigns for animal shelters and nonprofits.
- Sharing dog stories and photos on social media with hashtags like #InternationalDogDay.
- Providing special treats, grooming, or outings for pet dogs.
- Educational programs on dog training, care, and health.

== Impact ==
The observance has contributed to increasing public awareness of shelter dogs and the importance of pet adoption. Organizations, celebrities, and animal rights groups often use the day to spotlight dogs in need and encourage donations to dog-related causes. Retailers and pet brands frequently run promotions and events to celebrate the occasion.

== See also ==
- Dogs
- Animal welfare
