= Osaro Onaiwu =

Nigerian politician (born 1958)

Earl Osaro Osaze Onaiwu (born 23 December 1958) is a Nigerian politician, entrepreneur, impresario and socialite; he is Director-General of the PDP Governors Forum and former gubernatorial nominee for the All Progressives Grand Alliance of Edo State in the 2016 election. Born in Benin City to parents who were both academics, Onaiwu attended Ogbe Primary School before going to Baptist High School. Onaiwu studied Mass Communication in Auchi Polytechnic, Edo State. Founder of fashion houses Jalomeseki Couture and Osaronno, Africa's first all white bespoke menswear brand. Founder of Red Carpet Protocol, a reputation management consultancy, established in 2006, serving 36 state governments till date. Osaro-Onaiwu is also the founder of The Orovie Group, a real estate, hospitality and media company. He is also heavily involved in a charitable organisation called Joy Osaro-Onaiwu Foundation.
