= Godwin Obaseki =

Nigerian politician (born 1957)

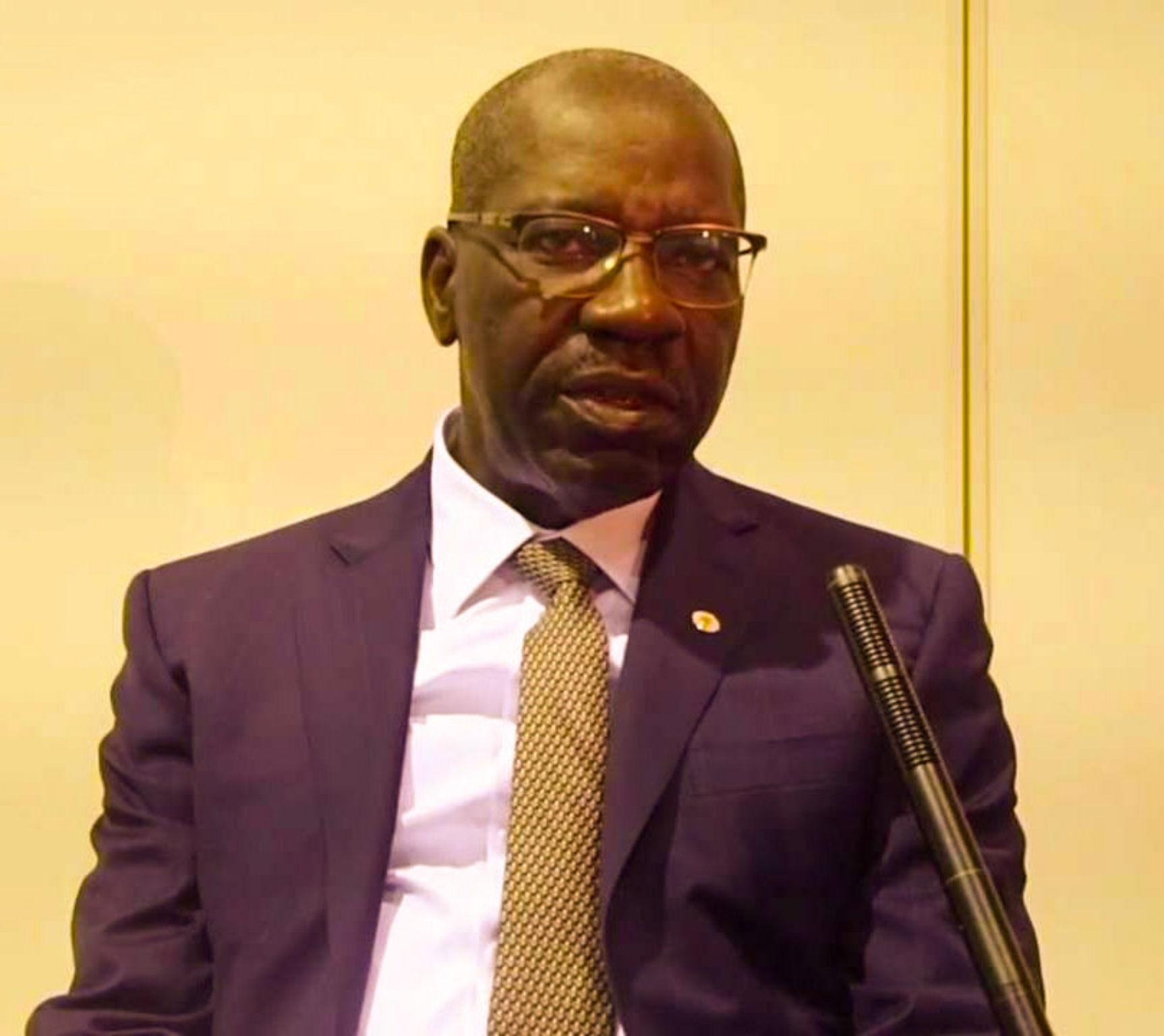
- Obaseki in 2018

Governor of Edo State
- In office 12 November 2016 – 12 November 2024
- Deputy: Philip Shaibu (2016–2024; 2024); Omobayo Godwins (2024)
- Preceded by: Adams Oshiomhole
- Succeeded by: Monday Okpebholo

Personal details
- Born: Godwin Nogheghase Obaseki; 1 July 1957 (age 69) Benin City, Western Region, British Nigeria
- Party: Peoples Democratic Party (2020–present)
- Other political affiliations: All Progressives Congress (2014–2020)
- Spouse: Betsy Bene Obaseki
- Education: Eghosa Grammar School, Benin City; University of Ibadan; Columbia University; Pace University
- Occupation: Politician; businessman
- Website: godwinobaseki.com

Godwin Nogheghase Obaseki (born 1 July 1957) is a Nigerian politician and businessman who served as the governor of Edo State from 2016 to 2024.

Obaseki was elected governor under the platform of the All Progressives Congress (APC) in 2016 where he defeated Osagie Ize-Iyamu of the Peoples Democratic Party. He was sworn in as governor on 12 November 2016. Before becoming governor, he was chairman of the Edo State Economic and Strategy Team inaugurated by former Governor Adams Oshiomhole in March 2009.

Obaseki holds postgraduate degrees in finance and international business, and is a Fellow of the Chartered Institute of Stock Brokers, Nigeria.

Obaseki has been a board member of several private companies, including Afrinvest. He was the recipient of the Nigerian Union of Teachers award for best performing governor of the year in October 2019.

== Early life and education ==
Obaseki was born in Benin City, Western Region, Nigeria (now Edo State, Nigeria). He is the third child of Late Pa Roland Obaseki and Gbinigie of Owina Street, Ogbelaka Quarters, Benin City. He attended St. Matthew's Primary School for his primary school education and Eghosa Grammar School, in Benin City, for secondary education.

=== Higher education ===
Obaseki obtained a Bachelor of Arts Degree in Classics from University of Ibadan . For his mandatory one year National Youth Service, he served in Jos, Plateau State. He later left Nigeria for the United States to attend Columbia University and Pace University in New York, where he obtained an MBA in Finance and International Business.

== Business career ==
Obaseki began his career as a stockbroker in 1983 with Capital Trust Brokers Limited, Lagos. He later transferred his services to the International Merchant Bank. He moved to AVC Funds Limited, Lagos, in 1988, where he was a project manager. He moved back to New York and worked as a principal of Equatorial Finance Company, a financial advisory firm. He focused on Africa and provided structured trade finance for Africa-related transactions.

In 1995, Godwin Obaseki founded Afrinvest West Africa Limited, formerly Securities Transactions & Trust Company Limited (SecTrust), now a major investment banking and management firm in Nigeria. Obaseki later stepped down from his position as chairman of the board of directors of Afrinvest in September 2016, to contest the gubernatorial election in Edo State.

== Public-sector work ==
Obaseki is the founding secretary of a US-based Africa Chamber of Commerce. He was also a Director of Junior Achievement of Nigeria, the local affiliate of international NGO. He also served in the Nigerian Securities and Exchange Commission Committee on the Re-activation of the Nigerian Bond Market and the review of the Investment and Securities Act. Between 2006 and 2009, he served as a member of the Nigerian Stock Exchange Council. He is a Trustee of the Dr Jackson Owen Obaseki Foundation, a family-owned Non-Governmental Organization (NGO). Before serving at the sub-national level, Obaseki served in the Presidential Committee on the Reform of the Nigerian Pension System, which facilitated the introduction of the contributory pension scheme and other novel pension reforms.

For seven years in the administration of Governor Adams Oshiomhole, his predecessor, he served as voluntary Chairman of the Edo State Economic and Strategy Team as well as Chairman of Tax Assessment Review Committee for Edo State Internal Revenue Service (TARC) and the Committee on Micro, Small and Medium Enterprises (MSME), respectively. In that capacity, he pioneered a number of policy reforms that saw the state restructure its public finance, secure funding for infrastructure and improve the business environment to attract investment in power, agriculture and other critical sectors. Obaseki was also instrumental in attracting the Edo-Azura power project, with support from World Bank to the state.

Aside these, some of his other reforms include: creating a culture of regular retreats for state development initiatives; the N25 Billion Infrastructure Development Bond from the Nigerian Capital Market in 2010; and leading sector-based economic summits and policy dialogue series.

He was Secretary of the Committee on the Implementation of the Law, establishing the present Edo University, Iyamho, and was a member of the Committee on Contributory Pension Scheme and Edo SEEFOR/DPO Steering Committee, respectively.

== Governorship ==
=== First term ===
On 29 September 2016, Obaseki was elected as the Governor of Edo State under the platform of the All Progressives Congress. He assumed duty as the Executive Governor of Edo State on 12 November 2016,

Obaseki has enacted projects with the aim of making the state an investment hub. Such projects include:

- The Benin River Port Project (Gelegele Seaport)
- The Benin Industrial Park
- Modular Refinery Project
- Technology Hubs
- Edojobs
- Edo State Oil Palm Programme (ESOPP)
- Ossiomo Power Project
- Edo Tech Park

Besides his infrastructural projects, he also enacted a number of social development initiatives, with the state government proposing to build about 200 primary healthcare centres. Obaseki's focus in the health sector had been to develop a viable primary healthcare system to provide affordable and accessible health care services to people in the state. He also pioneered a state-backed health insurance scheme to provide a robust sector to attract private investors.

He has also vigorously pushed Edo state as a viable investment destination. In January 2018, his government established the Edo State Investment Promotion Office (ESIPO) to facilitate investments and stakeholders engagements so as to improve the business environment in the state. The governor attracted $500m worth of investment into the state through the Edo State Oil Palm Programme (ESOPP), wgucg was poised to attract oil palm plantations to the state, as over 100,000 hectares of arable land are under cultivation in the programme. Some of the companies investing in oil palm development are Okomu Plc, Aden Rivers, Presco, Dufil (makers of Indomie Noodles), Nosak Group, among others.

In education, Obaseki launched the Edo Basic Education Transformation (Edo BEST) programme, an initiative to train and equip public school teachers with top-of-the-range skills and expertise for deploying information and communication technology in classrooms to improve learning outcomes. During the rollout and teacher-training graduation ceremonies for the Edo Basic Education Sector Transformation (EdoBEST) initiative held at the University of Benin Sports Complex, outstanding primary school pupils—including Osatohanmwen Divine Etinosa representing Emotan Primary School—addressed stakeholders, parents, and teachers to demonstrate the early impact of the state's literacy and learning reforms. There was also a strong emphasis on technical education, which led to the revamping of the Government Science and Technical College (formerly Benin Technical College) to train workforce in the state.

He also embarked on a massive reconstruction of the Samuel Ogbemudia Stadium to host the 2020 National Sports Festival. He has also worked against human trafficking and illegal migration.

In an article by Vanguard daily, he was tagged the "Wake and See Governor." Pundits say this was because he preferred working and delivering infrastructural projects without fanfare or rhetoric.

=== Second term ===
During the 2020 Edo Gubernatorial Election, Obaseki sought re-election under the APC but was controversially disqualified by the party's Primary Election Screening Committee from contesting the primary elections, citing missing letters on the governor's National Youth Service Corps certificate and the governor's university admission. The governor had had a running battle with his predecessor, Oshiomhole, the National Chairman of the APC, who headed the party's National Working Committee at the time, which constituted the screening committee. Political analysts argue that the former governor acted out a script, with the ultimate aim of denying the governor a second-term ticket under the APC. Oshiomhole was eventually sacked as National Chairman of the APC.

On 16 June 2020, Obaseki resigned his membership from the All Progressives Congress. On 19 June 2020, Obaseki decamped to the People's Democratic Party and declared his intentions to seek re-election on the platform. PDP described him as a big catch. On 20 September 2020, The Independent National Electoral Commission announced Obaseki the winner of the Edo State gubernatorial election. He won against his opponent from the All Progressives Congress, Osagie Ize Iyamu, with a total number of 307,955 votes.

The governor was in possession of his West African Examination Council High School Certificate, which the committee said was absent from the governor's credentials, while the NYSC reissued a corrected version of the governor's NYSC discharge certificate, while apologizing for being responsible for the initial error. The Federal High Court in Abuja eventually struck out a certificate forgery case instituted against the governor by the APC.

== Personal life ==
Obaseki is married to Betsy Bene Obaseki, a banker. She holds Bachelor and Master's degrees in accounting from the University of Lagos, and studied at the Kellogg School of Management Executive Management Programme, USA.

== See also ==
- List of governors of Edo State
