= Afrinvest =

Nigerian capital market holding company

Coordinates: 6.4562096°N 3.4423146°E

Afrinvest (West Africa) Ltd.
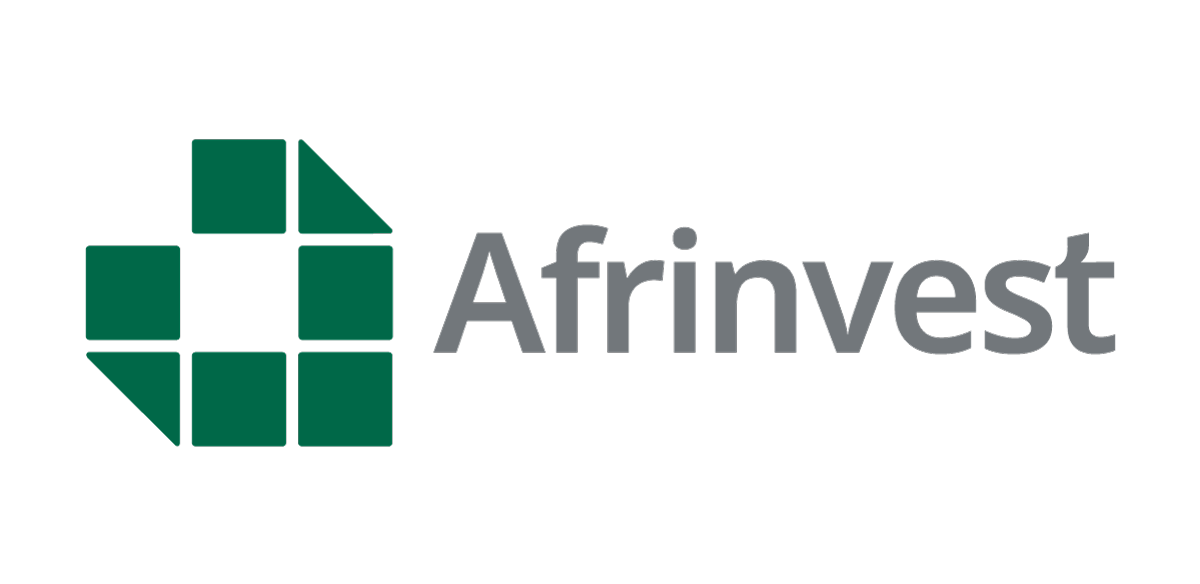
- Type: Private
- Industry: Financial services
- Founded: 1995; 31 years ago
- Founder: Godwin Obaseki
- Headquarters: Lagos, Nigeria, Nigeria
- Area served: Sub-Saharan Africa,Nigeria
- Key people: Donald Lawson (Chairman); Ike Chioke (Group Managing Director)Victor Ndukauba (Deputy Managing Director); Onoise Onagbinon (Chief Operating Officer)
- Products: Securities Trading, Asset Management, Investment Banking, Research & Consulting, Investment Banking,
- Subsidiaries: Afrinvest Securities Limited, Afrinvest Asset Management Limited, Afrinvest Trustees Limited, Afrinvest Capital Limited, Afrinvest Research and Consulting Limited, and Andromeda Technologies Limited
- Website: afrinvest.com

Afrinvest (West Africa) Limited is a Nigerian capital market holding company.

Afrinvest is both a provider of research content on the Nigerian market and an adviser to blue-chip companies across West Africa on M&A and international capital market transactions.

Regulated by the Securities and Exchange Commission (“SEC”) as an Issuing House and Underwriter, Afrinvest provides financial advisory services as well as capital raising to high net-worth individuals ("HNIs"), corporations, and governments.

Afrinvest maintains established offices in Lagos, Abuja, Onitsha, Port-Harcourt, and Kano.

== History ==
Afrinvest was founded in 1995 by Godwin Obaseki as Securities Transactions & Trust Company (Nigeria) Limited (“SecTrust”). Over the years, SecTrust established a close relationship with its London-based partners (“Afrinvest Limited”), an investment banking firm regulated by the United Kingdom Financial Services Authority (“FSA”). Following commencement of its business restructuring in 2005, SecTrust combined with the Nigeria-based corporate finance business of Afrinvest (UK) Limited.

This phase of business restructuring was concluded in December 2005 and culminated in the renaming of SecTrust as Afrinvest (West Africa) Limited.

The company is registered as an Issuing House by the SEC while its other two subsidiaries, Afrinvest Securities Limited and Afrinvest Asset Management Limited, house the company's broker-dealer and fund manager licenses respectively.

- The first-ever listing of a dollar-denominated fixed income fund in Nigeria—The Nigeria International Debt Fund
- The first-ever issue of global depository receipts by a Sub-Saharan Africa corporate – United Bank for Africa Plc (UBA)
- The first Eurobond issue by a Sub-Saharan Africa corporate outside South Africa – Guaranty Trust Bank Plc
- The first listing of an African bank's global depositary receipts on the London Stock Exchange – Guaranty Trust Bank Plc
- Financial adviser and broker on the largest listing on the Nigerian Stock Exchange (2.095 trillion) – Dangote Cement Plc
- The first Nigerian asset manager to be rated A+

== Corporate governance ==
As of May 31, 2017 Donald Lawson was a non-executive director at Afrinvest prior becoming chairman of the board. In 2021, Onoise Onaghinon was appointed Chief Operating Officer. She joined Afrinvest in 2003 as an analyst for the investment banking division.
