= Nigerian Gas Association =

Industry professional body in Nigeria

The Nigerian Gas Association is the professional body responsible for the promotion and protection of the interests of the gas industry in Nigeria.

Formed in 1999, the NGA's initial membership came from the primary gas production and utilization companies in Nigeria. The earliest members include the Nigerian National Petroleum Corporation (NNPC), the Shell Petroleum Development Company (SPDC), the Nigeria Liquefied Natural Gas Limited (NLNG), Chevron Nigeria Limited, the Nigerian Gas Company (NGC), Elf Petroleum, Mobil Producing Nigeria, the Nigerian Agip Oil Company (NAOC) and Conoco Energy Nigeria Limited.

The NGA has since grown to encompass the entire gamut of stakeholders and operators in the Nigerian gas industry – from gas producers, to transmitters, gas industry service providers, students, members of the academia and government. The association presently has over 40 corporate members, 800 individual professional industry members, and more than 100 student members. The NGA is also a full chartered member of the International Gas Union (IGU), representing Nigeria on the council of the global gas body.

== Aims and objectives ==
The aims of the Nigerian Gas Association include:

1. Providing enlightenment to gas industry players and the general public on various developments in the Nigerian and global gas business.
2. Engaging the Nigerian government and other key industry stakeholders with a view to creating policy and laws that enhance the growth and development of the Nigerian gas industry.
3. Providing an avenue for unique, non-biased intervention on issues concerning the Nigerian gas industry.
4. Creating networking opportunities for individuals and organizations involved in the gas business, enabling them to create better value for themselves.

== Organization ==
The Nigerian Gas Association (NGA) is run by a council of elected officers who serve for a single term of two years. The Association’s elections usually hold just before the commencement of its Annual General Meeting (AGM). The Association also has a functional secretariat that is staffed by competent administrative personnel to provide members and non-members with information and other support activities as required.

The Nigerian Gas Association's Council comprises the following officers;

1. The President.
2. The First Vice President.
3. The Second Vice President.
4. The General Secretary.
5. The Assistant General Secretary.
6. The Legal Adviser.
7. The Publicity Secretary.

== Events and activities ==
The Nigerian Gas Association usually organizes events and activities through which it drives to achieve its agenda-setting and industry engagement activities. Some of these events include:

=== Quarterly Business Fora ===
Business leaders and other prespected parties in the Nigerian gas business/industry are usually invited to the NGA Business Fora, where they speak and share their thoughts on agreed themes. The quarterly fora are free to all NGA members and serve as a pint for the gathering of the latest thoughts on the Nigerian gas industry.

=== Conference and exhibition ===
Held every two years, the NGA Conference and Exhibition serve as the highlights of the NGA's calendar. The events are usually attended by experts, members of the academia from within and outside Nigeria. The theme for the conference is set from the end of the previous conference, and papers are delivered by subject-matter experts. The event is also characterised by syndicate sessions and an exhibition, where all gas industry players exhibit their products, services and projects to attendees.

=== Training series ===
To be launched in June 2010, The NGA Training Series are a set of training programmes organized by the NGA to address certain skill and competency gaps identified in the Nigerian gas industry. The training programmes will be contextualised to fit and meet with the requirements of the Nigerian market, and will prosecuted by both professional experts with real industry experience.

== Process and Industrial Developments dispute ==
Process and Industrial Developments Ltd (P&ID) entered into a 20-year contract with the Nigerian government for natural gas supply and processing. Nigeria provided the gas, which PI&D refined so that it could be used to power the Nigerian electrical grid. PI&D could keep valuable byproducts for its own use. In 2012, PI&D demanded arbitration in London, alleging that Nigeria had not supplied the agreed quantity of gas or to construct the infrastructure it had agreed to build. The arbitral tribunal awarded damages of more than £4.8 billion. The compensation was valued £8.15 billion with interest when the case was heard in London High Court in December 2022.
