= Ike Chioke =

Nigerian investment banker, philanthropist

- Born: Udi, Enugu State, Nigeria
- Education: B.Sc. Civil Engineering (First Class Honours, Obafemi Awolowo University); M.Phil. Management Studies (Rhodes Scholar, University of Oxford, 1989)
- Occupations: Investment banker, philanthropist, author
- Known for: Group Managing Director of Afrinvest (West Africa) Limited; Chairman, Enugu State Security Trust Fund; Central School Obioma rebuild; author of Akpokuedike: Duty Call in Anambra
- Spouse: Yvonne Chioke
- Children: 3

Ike Chioke is a Nigerian investment banker, philanthropist, and author. He is the Group Managing Director of Afrinvest (West Africa) Limited, a leading investment firm, and has served in key advisory roles in Nigerian governance, including chairing the Enugu State Security Trust Fund and Transition Committee. Chioke is also recognized for his philanthropy, notably rebuilding the Central School Obioma in Enugu State.

== Early life and education ==
Born in Udi, Enugu State, Chioke began his education at Central School Obioma in 1970. He earned a B.Sc. in Civil Engineering with First Class Honours from Obafemi Awolowo University (formerly University of Ife) and later attended the University of Oxford as a Rhodes Scholar (Nigeria & Wadham College, 1989), obtaining an M.Phil. in Management Studies. Since 2017, he has served as National Secretary for the Rhodes Scholarship for West Africa.

== Career ==
Chioke has over 30 years of experience in investment banking, specializing in mergers and acquisitions, project finance, and capital markets, with expertise in telecommunications, media, financial services, and industrial sectors. After working at Arthur Andersen, Goldman Sachs, Salomon Smith Barney, and Citigroup in the U.S. and U.K., he joined Afrinvest in London in 2002, advising on transactions worth over $7.5 billion. He served as Deputy Managing Director and Head of Investment Banking at Afrinvest West Africa Ltd from 2005 to 2009, then as Vice Chairman, CEO, and Managing Director from 2009 onward. He serves as Group Managing Director of Afrinvest (West Africa) Limited, a position he has held since founding Afrinvest Nigeria in 2004 from his garage in Abuja. By 2025, Afrinvest grew to nearly 200 staff across five offices.

He is the immediate past President of the Association of Issuing Houses of Nigeria and Chairman of Royal Exchange General Insurance Company Limited. He has also served as Chairman of the Central Bank of Nigeria’s FSS 2020 Capital Markets Committee and a member of the Debt Management Office’s Bond Market Steering Committee. Chioke is the author of Akpokuedike: Duty Call in Anambra (Partridge Publishing Singapore, 2022), a biography of former Anambra State Governor Willie Obiano, detailing his governance and economic initiatives.

== Philanthropy ==
In 2022, Chioke rebuilt the Central School Obioma in Udi, Enugu State, where he studied as a child. The N100 million project transformed the 1941 missionary-built school into a modern facility with eight classrooms, a library, an ICT centre with 30 computers, a clinic, and restrooms for 300 pupils.

== Philanthropy and Sponsorships ==
Through Afrinvest, Chioke has supported sports development in Enugu State as Rangers International FC's major shirt sponsor since October 2023. Under the partnership, the club won the 2023/2024 Nigeria Premier Football League (NPFL) title, their eighth overall. In September 2025, Chioke announced the extension of the deal, committing to back the team in the 2025/2026 CAF Champions League and praising the club's "doggedness" as a foundation for elevating Nigerian football. He credited the achievement to the team's management, coaches, players, and support from Enugu State Governor Peter Mbah.

== Public and cultural roles ==
Chioke has held significant advisory roles in Enugu State, including chairing the 2023 Transition Committee under Governor-elect Peter Mbah and the Enugu State Security Trust Fund, launched to support a N20 billion security budget. He also chairs the Anambra State Investment Promotion and Protection Agency (ANSIPPA), serves on the Ministry of Finance Incorporated (MOFI) board, and is a member of the Steering Committee of the Alaigbo Stabilization Fund. He was formerly Chairman of the Enugu State Technical Committee on Privatisation and Commercialisation.

He is a Board Member of Afrinvest West Africa Ltd, Afrinvest Asset Management Ltd, and the American University of Nigeria (since 2017). He served as a Board Member of the Nigeria Sovereign Investment Authority from 2021 to 2022.

In 2025, as Chairman of the Things Fall Apart Festival, Chioke advocated for Igbo unity, drawing on Chinua Achebe’s novel to address Nigeria’s social and economic challenges. He is a member of the American University of Nigeria’s Governing Council (since 2017) and served as its Commencement Speaker in 2017.

== Personal life ==
Chioke, a prince of Udi kingdom, met his Dutch wife, Yvonne, in Kenya while working on a transaction for Salomon Smith Barney. They have three children.
