= Morénike Giwa Onaiwu =

American HIV and autism activist

- Education: United States International University (BA); University of Texas of the Permian Basin (MA); University of East Anglia (PhD)
- Occupations: Educator, activist, author
- Website: https://morenikego.com/

Morénike Giwa Onaiwu is an American educator, author, and autism and HIV advocate. Alongside E. Ashkenazy and Ly Xīnzhèn M. Zhǎngsūn Brown, Onaiwu is an editor of All the Weight of Our Dreams, an anthology of art and writing entirely by autistic people of color published by the Autism Women's Network in June 2017.

== Biography ==
=== Personal life ===
Giwa Onaiwu was born in the United States to immigrant parents from Nigeria and Cape Verde, where the majority of her relatives still live. She states that her early symptoms of autism were possibly misinterpreted as characteristics of "a black person [...] trying to fit into the white environment", especially with more physical symptoms misinterpreted as the "stereotype of the violent or over emotional or sassy black person". In an interview with Quartz, she stated: "Many characteristics that I possess that are clearly autistic were instead attributed to my race or gender. As a result, not only was I deprived of supports that would have been helpful, I was misunderstood and also, at times, mistreated."

Giwa Onaiwu attended United States International University in San Diego, California. She served as an undergraduate working with refugee children in a housing project and as a mentor in public schools. After graduating with a BA in International Relations, Giwa Onaiwu worked in the non-profit sector with a variety of disenfranchised groups, including women, at-risk teens, and refugee families.

She has multiple adopted and biological children, of whom the two youngest are also autistic. Giwa Onaiwu uses both she and singular they pronouns.

Giwa Onaiwu graduated with a master's in Special Education from the University of Texas of the Permian Basin.

=== Activism ===
Giwa Onaiwu has launched and led a number of campaigns for human rights, concentrating on HIV and Autism advocacy. In 2009, she began as an active participant in HIV research and advocacy, and she founded the organization Positive Playdates to benefit families affected by HIV. This organization would later be merged into Advocacy Without Borders, an organization she founded in 2014 to support community activists.

Giwa Onaiwu is co-chair of the Women's HIV Research Collaborative and the ACTG Community Scientific Committee elected representative to the international cross-network Community Partners Working Group. She was the chair of the Autism and Race Committee for the Autistic Women's Network from 2014 to 2020. She is a current and former executive and advisory board member of a number of organizations, including serving as Vice Chair of the Autistic Self Advocacy Network (ASAN) Board of Directors from 2016 to 2020.

However, in 2021, Giwa Onaiwu signed a letter stating that Autistic Self Advocacy Network was silencing racial minorities and autistic individuals with intellectual disabilities. Allegations included that ASAN plagiarized a Native American activist's work, and that several board members who are racial minorities resigned due to racial discrimination. She later announced that she was leaving the #actuallyautistic movement because of issues such as microaggressions.

Outside of organizations, she has acted as an individual activist. In 2015, she started a petition to dismiss felony assault charges against an autistic middle school student and delivered it to the court alongside several other autism advocates. In March 2018, Giwa Onaiwu was featured in the Simons Foundation's Spectrum alongside two other women, all speaking on their various experiences as autistic women.

Giwa Onaiwu speaks at functions to raise awareness and promote the empowerment of marginalized communities, including abuse survivors, people of color, and disabled people including autistic girls and women of color and of those living with HIV/AIDS.

=== Research and writing ===
Giwa Onaiwu has held several leadership positions in prominent global research networks for HIV clinical research, autism, and gender. She is an editor and author of several publications, including edited collections, chapters, peer-reviewed articles, and op eds. Her most recent publication, Sincerely, Your Autistic Child: What People on the Autism Spectrum Wish Their Parents Knew About Growing Up, Acceptance, and Identity, is published by Beacon Press and co-edited with Autistic Women and Nonbinary Network. She will release Neurodiversity En Noir: A Collection of Black Neurodiverse Voices, with Jessica Kingsley Publishing in late 2021.

== Bibliography ==
- Brown, Lydia; Ashkenazy, E.; Giwa-Onaiwu, Morénike, eds. (2017). All the Weight of Our Dreams: On Living Racialized Autism. Autism Women's Network. ISBN 9780997504507.
