= Osagie Ize-Iyamu =

Nigerian politician and farmer

Pastor Osagie Ize-Iyamu

Chief of Staff to Edo state government
- In office 1999–2003

SSG of Edo State
- In office 2003–2007

Personal details
- Born: 21 June 1961 (age 65) Benin City, Edo, Nigeria
- Party: All Progressives Congress (APC)
- Spouse: Professor Idia Ize-Iyamu
- Children: 4
- Occupation: Pastor, Politician, Lawyer and Farmer
- Website: pastorosagieizeiyamu.com

Osagie Ize-Iyamu (born 21 June 1961) is a Nigerian pastor, politician, and former Chief of Staff and Secretary to the Edo State Government. He was the gubernatorial candidate of the Edo state People's Democratic Party for the 2016 Edo State gubernatorial election. He is currently a member of the All Progressives Congress (APC). Ize-Iyamu was the National Vice-Chairman, South-South Zone, of the defunct Action Congress of Nigeria (ACN).

Ize-Iyamu served as the Director General of Adams Oshiomhole's second term Campaign Organisation. He was also the Coordinator of Goodluck/Sambo Campaign Organisation in Edo State, 2015. Recently, he was honoured by the Benson Idahosa University

== Early life and family ==
Osagie Ize-Iyamu was born in Benin City to Chief Robert Osayande Ize-Iyamu and Mrs. Magdalene Naghado Ize- Iyamu (née Obasohan). His father was a revered high chief of the Oba of Benin, ranking second in command until his demise as the Esogban of Benin. His mother was a trained teacher who became a trader.

A most significant aspect of the history of the Ize-Iyamu family is that it holds the record of building and owning the first storey building "Egedege N'Okaro" in the whole of the Mid-Western Region, Nigeria which is the present day Edo and Delta States. It was built in 1906 by Osagie's great grandfather, the late Chief Iyamu, Inneh of Benin Kingdom.

== Education ==
Ize-Iyamu attended St. Joseph Primary School and Ebenezer Nursery and Primary School in Benin City. He had his Secondary education at Edo College and passed out with grade I in his West African Examination Council (WAEC) examinations. Iyamu attended the University of Benin where he graduated with an LL.B (Hons) and proceeded to the Nigerian Law School where he was awarded the Bachelor of Law (BL) qualification and called to the Nigerian Bar in 1987.

He is an honorary doctorate degree holder of the Benson Idahosa University, Benin City. On July 1, 2019, he was recognized for his contribution to the development of Nigeria's democratic process and rule of law, receiving the Lifetime Achievers Award from the Nigerian Bar Association, Benin (Lion) Branch.

== Personal life ==
Osagie Ize-Iyamu is married to (Dr.) Idia Ize-Iyamu, a consultant orthodontist with the University of Benin Teaching Hospital and a professor at the University of Benin. They have four children.

== 2024 Governorship Race ==
On 17 February 2024, Iyamu withdrew from the governorship race 24 hours before primary election.
