= Deputy governor of Edo State =

Second highest-ranking official in the executive branch of Edo State in Nigeria

Deputy Governor of Edo State
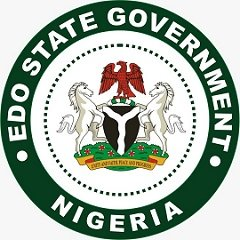
- Seal of Edo State

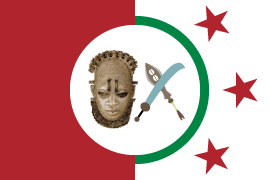
- Flag of Edo State

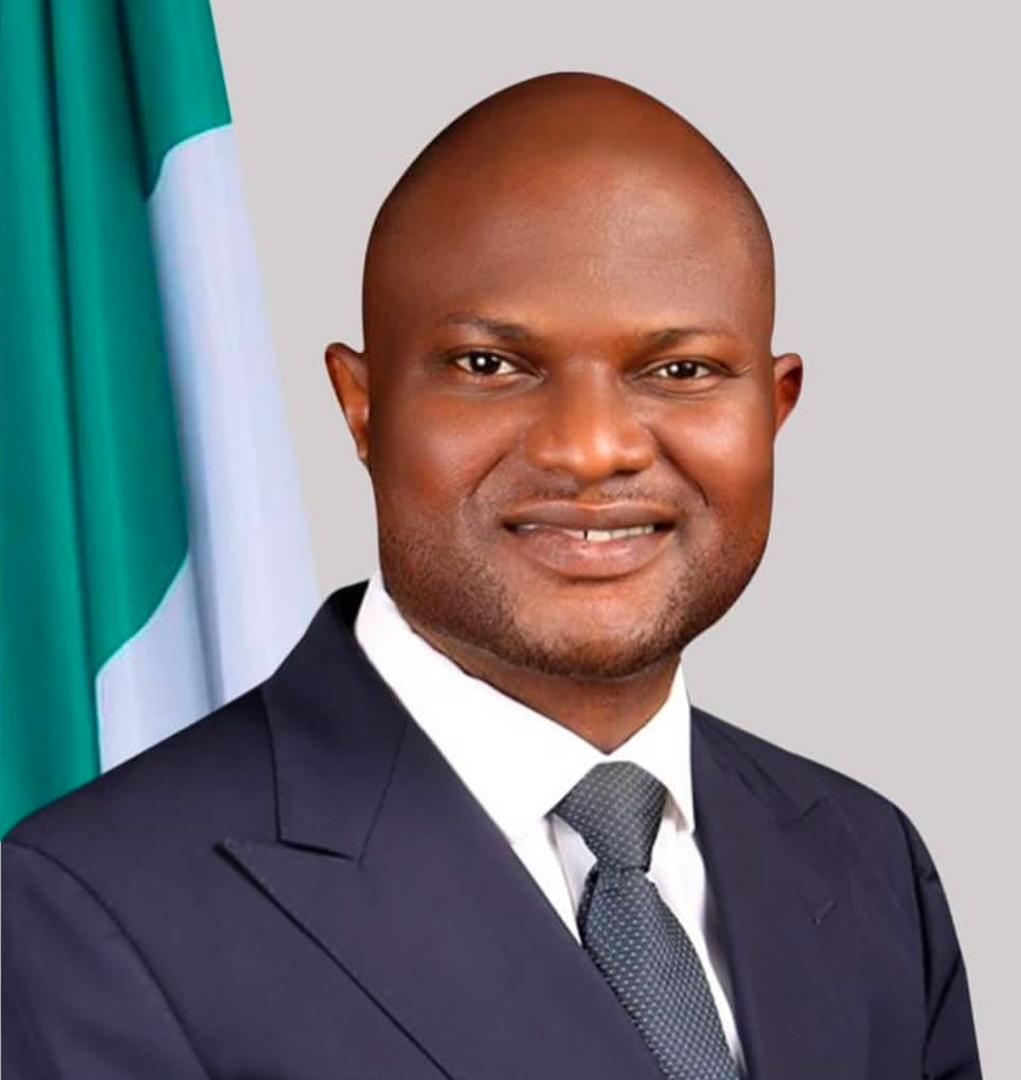
- Incumbent; Dennis Idahosa since 12 November 2024
- Executive Branch of the Edo State Government
- Style: Deputy Governor (informal); His Excellency (courtesy)
- Status: Second highest executive branch officer
- Member of: Edo State Executive Branch; Edo State Cabinet
- Seat: Benin City
- Nominator: Gubernatorial candidate
- Appointer: Direct popular election or, if vacant, Governor via House of Assembly confirmation
- Term length: Four years; renewable once
- Constituting instrument: Constitution of Nigeria
- Inaugural holder: Mike Oghiadomhe (Fourth Republic)
- Succession: First
- Website: edostate.gov.ng

The deputy governor of Edo State is the second-highest officer in the executive branch of the government of Edo State, Nigeria, after the governor of Edo State, and ranks first in line of succession. The deputy governor is directly elected together with the governor to a four-year term of office. The deputy governor has the constitutional power to act as the governor in the event of the governor's death, resignation, impeachment, or absence. The deputy governor also assists the governor in the administration of the state and performs any other duties that the governor may assign to him or her.

Dennis Idahosa is the current deputy governor, having assumed office on 12 November 2024.

== Qualifications ==
As in the case of the Governor, in order to be qualified to be elected as deputy governor, a person must:

- be at least thirty-five (35) years of age;
- be a Nigerian citizen by birth;
- be a member of a political party with endorsement by that political party;
- have School Certificate or its equivalent.

== Duties and responsibilities ==
The deputy governor of Edo State has the following duties and responsibilities:

- Filling in for the governor in the event of the governor's unavailability or inability
- Helping the governor in the development and execution of policies and programmes of the state government
- Overseeing the activities of the state executive council and its committees
- Managing the ministries, departments and agencies of the state government
- Presiding over the state boundary committee and the state emergency management agency
- Representing the state government in national and international events
- Communicating with the federal government, other states, local governments and civil society organisations on issues of common interest
- Performing any other duties that the governor may assign to him or her

== List of deputy governors ==
Name	Took office	Left office	Time in office	Party	Elected	Governor
Mike Oghiadomhe (born 1955)	29 May 1999	29 May 2007	8 years	Peoples Democratic Party	1999; 2003	Lucky Igbinedion
Lucky Imasuen	29 May 2007	11 November 2008	1 year, 166 days	Peoples Democratic Party	2007	Oserheimen Osunbor
Pius Odubu (born 1957)	12 November 2008	12 November 2016	8 years	Action Congress of Nigeria All Progressives Congress	2012	Adams Oshiomhole
Philip Shaibu (born 1969)	12 November 2016	8 April 2024	7 years, 148 days	All Progressives Congress Peoples Democratic Party	2016; 2020	Godwin Obaseki
Omobayo Godwins (born 1986)	8 April 2024	12 November 2024	218 days	Peoples Democratic Party		Godwin Obaseki
Philip Shaibu (born 1969)	17 July 2024	12 November 2024	118 days	Peoples Democratic Party All Progressives Congress		Godwin Obaseki
Dennis Idahosa (born 1980)	12 November 2024	Incumbent	1 year, 307 days	All Progressives Congress	2024	Monday Okpebholo
