= List of governors of Bendel State =

This is a list of administrators and governors of Bendel State, Nigeria. Mid-Western region was created in June 1963 from the Benin and Delta provinces. The status of the region was changed to a state on 27 May 1967, and the state was renamed Bendel State on 17 March 1976. Bendel State was divided into Delta State and Edo State on 27 August 1991.

Mid-Western State Leaders	Title	Took office	Left office	Party	Notes
Jereton Mariere	Governor	February 1964	January 1966		Civilian
Lt. Colonel David Ejoor	Governor	January 1966	August 1967	(Military)	
Major Albert Okonkwo	Administrator	August 17, 1967	September 1967	(Military)	Biafra secessionist force
Brig. General Samuel Ogbemudia	Administrator later Governor	21 Sep 1967	Jul 1975	(Military)	
Colonel George Agbazika Innih	Governor	Jul 1975	Mar 1976	(Military)	
Bendel State leaders					
Commodore Husaini Abdullahi	Governor	Mar 1976	Jul 1978	(Military)	
Abubakar Waziri	Governor	Jul 1978	Oct 1979	(Military)	
Professor Ambrose Folorunsho Alli	Governor	Oct 1979	Oct 1983	UPN	
Dr. Samuel Ogbemudia	Governor	Oct 1983	Dec 1983	NPN	
Brigadier Jeremiah Timbut Useni	Governor	Jan 1984	Aug 1985	(Military)	
Colonel John Mark Inienger	Governor	Aug 1985	Dec 1987	(Military)	
Colonel Jonathan Tunde Ogbeha	Governor	Dec 1987	Aug 1990	(Military)	
Colonel John Ewerekumoh Yeri	Governor	Aug 1990	Jan 1992	(Military)	

== See also ==
- List of governors of Delta State
- List of governors of Edo State
- States of Nigeria
- List of state governors of Nigeria
