= 1979 Bendel State gubernatorial election =

1979 gubernatorial election in Bendel State, Nigeria

- July 28, 1979
Nominee	Ambrose Folorunsho Alli
Party	UPN
Governor before election
Abubakar Waziri
Nigerian military junta
Elected Governor
Ambrose Folorunsho Alli
UPN

The 1979 Bendel State gubernatorial election occurred on July 28, 1979. UPN's Ambrose Alli won election for a first term to become Bendel State's first executive governor leading and defeating main opposition in the contest.

== Electoral system ==
The Governor of Bendel State is elected using the plurality voting system.

== Results ==
There were five political parties registered by the Federal Electoral Commission (FEDECO) participated in the elections. Ambrose Folorunsho Alli of the NPN won the contest by polling the highest votes.

Candidate	Party
Ambrose Folorunsho Alli	Unity Party of Nigeria (UPN)
National Party of Nigeria (NPN)	
Total
Source: Africa Spectrum
