= Samuel Ogbemudia =

Nigerian politician

Brigadier General Samuel Osaigbovo Ogbemudia

Governor, Mid-West State, Nigeria
- In office 26 October 1967 – July 1975
- Preceded by: Albert Okonkwo
- Succeeded by: George Innih

Governor, Bendel State, Nigeria
- In office October 1983 – 31 December 1983
- Preceded by: Ambrose Alli
- Succeeded by: Jeremiah Timbut Useni

Personal details
- Born: 17 September 1932
- Died: 9 March 2017 (aged 84)
- Children: 17 (13 girls and 4 boys)

Military service
- Allegiance: Nigeria
- Branch/service: Nigerian Army
- Rank: Brigadier General

Samuel Osaigbovo Ogbemudia (17 September 1932 – 9 March 2017) was a Nigerian army officer and politician. He was military Governor (1967–1975) of the Mid-West State, later renamed Bendel State, part of which in turn later became Edo State. After the return to democracy in 1999, he became a powerbroker in the Peoples Democratic Party (PDP). In September 2009, Governor Adams Oshiomhole of Edo state and others attended his 77th birthday celebration in Benin. He is noted as one of the founding fathers of the very prestigious University of Benin Teaching Hospital (UBTH)

== Early years ==
Osaigbovo Ogbemudia was born Samuel Chinedu Osaigbovo Ogbemudia in Benin City on 17 September 1932, he was named after his grandfather. He is from Orhionmwon LGA. In Edo language, the name Ogbemudia can be inferred to mean "this family has come to stay". Also means 'my family stand/neighbourhood is here to stay' in Edo As a youth he lived with his elder cousin, F.S. Uwaifo, in Benin. He attended Benin Baptist School (1941–1945), and then the government school, Victoria, in the Cameroons (1945–1947). His secondary education was at the Western Boy's High School, Benin City (1947–1949).

He joined the Nigeria army in 1956, training at Teshie, Ghana and at Netheravon and Salisbury Plain in England (1957). He attended the Mons Officer Cadet School at Aldershot, England, in 1960, and was commissioned as a second lieutenant in 1961. He attended the United States army special welfare school at Fort Bragg, North Carolina in 1962. Ogbemudia served with the United Nations peacekeeping force in the Congo for 16 months, and served in Tanzania in 1964. He was appointed as an instructor to the Nigerian Military School, Zaria in 1964.

== Career during military rule ==
In January 1966, a coup d'état overthrew the civilian government of Nigeria. In July 1966, the military ruler Major General Johnson Aguiyi-Ironsi was deposed and killed in the so-called Nigerian counter-coup of 1966 led by Lieutenant Colonel Murtala Mohammed. Ironsi's chief of staff Yakubu Gowon became head of state. As the Brigade Major of the Ist Brigade in Kaduna, Ogbemudia played an important role in the counter-coup by disarming his troops in Kaduna at the suggestion of artillery commander Lt-Colonel Alex Madiebo. During the counter-coup/mutiny, an attempt on Major Ogbemudia's life was also made by then Lt Buka Suka Dimka but Major Ogbemudia escaped because of a tip from Colonel Hassan Katsina and Major Abba Kyari. In August that year he was transferred to the area command, Benin City as Quarter Master-General, 4th Area Command. Ogbemudia along with Major General Ejoor, the Military Governor of the Mid-western State and Pius Ermobor, an intelligence officer were the only three officers of the rank of Major and above who held strategic leaderships positions and who were not from the Igbo speaking communities of the Mid-west region. On 9 August 1967, Biafran troops led by Victor Banjo invaded Mid-western region and its capital, Benin city with minimal resistance, a surprise attack whose success was helped in part by an arrangement between Biafran leaders and some senior officers from the 4th Area Command. Ejoor was able to escape to Lagos while Ogbemudia briefly went underground organizing a resistance movement composed of people disaffected by the invasion. He later left for Army Headquarters, Lagos and joined the Murtala Mohammed led Second Infantry Division on a counterattacking mission to Midwest. On 20 September 1967, troops led by Ogbemudia seized Benin city from Biafran forces.

Ogbemudia was appointed Military administrator of Mid-West state in September, 1967 following the liberation of state from the secessionist Biafran forces. Promoted to Lt. Colonel, Ogbemudia was appointed Military Governor of the state on 26 October 1967. A populist, dedicated to reconstruction after the war, he initiated improvements in the areas of sports, urban development, education, public transportation, housing and commerce. He built the Ogbe sports stadium, now named the Samuel Ogbemudia Stadium, and in August 1973 he commissioned the three-story National Museum in Benin City. Other projects included the Agbede Mechanized Farm, Rural Electrification Board, Bendel Steel Structures, Bendel Pharmaceuticals, Bendel Boatyard, the University of Benin and the Bendel Line. In later years, people looked back on his governorship as a time when much was achieved, followed by stagnation in later administrations.

Members of his cabinet included Edwin Clark, Frank Oputa-Otutu, T.E.A. Salubi, and Lawrence Leo Borha.

In July 1975, when Murtala Mohammed became head of state, he retired the twelve military governors who had served under Yakubu Gowon. The retirement was later converted to dismissal after some of the governors were found guilty of corruption. Among these was Samuel Ogbemudia, whom Murtala, then leader of the Mid-west invasion had unilaterally appointed eight years earlier, and whom he replaced with Colonel George Agbazika Innih. Ogbemudia was investigated by a panel in 1975 but felt he could not receive a fair trial because the head of the panel had been relieved of his previous position by Ogbemudia. The 1975 asset investigation panel however found him guilty of corrupt enrichment. In the second republic, he was cleared by the Bendel State House of Assembly of mis-governance.

Ogbemudia was in London during the July 1975 coup and helped with renovations of Gowon's London abode after the ex-president went into exile.

== Post military career ==
During a brief return to civil rule, Ogbemudia was elected governor of Bendel State in October 1983 as candidate for the National Party of Nigeria, replacing Ambrose Alli of the Unity Party of Nigeria. However, he lost his position in December that year when Muhammadu Buhari became military ruler after a coup d'état that overthrew civilian President Shehu Shagari.

Between 1987 and 1989, Ogbemudia was Chairman of the Nigerian Sports Commission, in 1989, Babangida appointed him as the Sole Administrator of the struggling Nigerian Railway Corporation (NRC). During his administration, the operations and finances of the corporation improved before he left NRC in 1992.

General Sani Abacha, military head of state from November 1993, until his death in June 1998, appointed Ogbemudia as minister for Labor and Productivity. Ogbemudia was quoted as saying he would die for Abacha. Ogbemudia supported a move to have Abacha stand for election, saying "The nation has made wonderful progress under General Abacha ... He is, no doubt, the only answer to Nigeria's progress and development".

=== Fourth republic ===
After the restoration of democracy in 1998/1999, Ogbemudia was one of the founders of the Peoples Democratic Party (PDP) in Edo state, and a member of the party's Board of Trustees. Ogbemudia and Chief Anthony Anenih controlled PDP politics in Edo State for the next decade, at first working well together but later coming into open conflict.

In December 2004, Ogbemudia was said to have agreed that Anthony Anenih should nominate his choice of governor for Edo State. He said he did not want a situation where one senatorial district in the state had a permanent hold on the position of governor. In November 2007, at an enlarged meeting of the PDP at the Samuel Ogbemudia Stadium in Benin, Ogbemudia spoke strongly against proposals by Anthony Anenih to change existing zoning arrangement of offices, then walked out of the meeting.

In December 2006, Ogbemudia expressed support for the presidential bid of Dr. Mohammed Buba Marwa.

On 20 March 2008, a tribunal nullified the election of Oserheimen Osunbor (PDP) as Edo State governor due to voting irregularities, and declared comrade Adams Oshiomhole of the Action Congress as the winner. In an interview in November that year, as a prominent member of the PDP board of trustees Ogbemudia said he would have preferred a PDP member to have won. However, he accepted the tribunal result, and described Oshiomhole as a man of strong character. He spoke critically of earlier governors, such as Chief Lucky Igbinedion.

In July 2009, Ogbemudia was leader of a PDP faction that was supporting Prof. Julius Ihonvbere as candidate for the Edo State governorship in 2011. A rival faction led by Tony Anenih favoured Senator Odion Ugbesia as candidate. In October 2009, Ogbemudia failed to attend the unity rally of the party in Edo state organised by Anthony Anenih. A month later, Ogbemudia praised Oshiomhole's accomplishments in his first year of office, leading to speculations of a possible political alliance between the two men.

== Death ==
On 9 March 2017, Sam Ogbemudia (jr) announced the death of his father to journalists at the deceased’s residence. He said his father died the previous day, at a private hospital in Lagos. He was aged 84.
