= 1999 Nigerian Senate elections in Edo State =

The 1999 Nigerian Senate election in Edo State was held on February 20, 1999, to elect members of the assembly's upper chamber to represent Edo State. Victor Oyofo representing Edo North, Oserheimen Osunbor representing Edo Central and Roland Owie representing Edo South all won on the platform of the Peoples Democratic Party.

== Overview ==
| Affiliation | Party | | Total |
| Affiliation | PDP | AD | Total |
|---|---|---|---|
| Before Election | | | 3 |
| After Election | 3 | 0 | 3 |

== Summary ==
| District | Incumbent | Party | Elected Senator | Party |
|---|---|---|---|---|
| Edo North | | | Victor Oyofo | PDP |
| Edo Central | | | Oserheimen Osunbor | PDP |
| Edo South | | | Roland Owie | PDP |

== Results ==
=== Edo North ===
The election was won by Victor Oyofo of the Peoples Democratic Party.

1999 Nigerian Senate election in Edo State
| Party | Candidate | Votes | % |
|---|---|---|---|
| PDP | Victor Oyofo | | |
| Total votes | | | |
| PDP hold | | | |

=== Edo Central ===
The election was won by Oserheimen Osunbor of the Peoples Democratic Party.

1999 Nigerian Senate election in Edo State
| Party | Candidate | Votes | % |
|---|---|---|---|
| PDP | Oserheimen Osunbor | | |
| Total votes | | | |
| PDP hold | | | |

=== Edo South ===
The election was won by Roland Owie of the Peoples Democratic Party.

1999 Nigerian Senate election in Edo State
| Party | Candidate | Votes | % |
|---|---|---|---|
| PDP | Roland Owie | | |
| Total votes | | | |
| PDP hold | | | |
