= 1983 Bendel State gubernatorial election =

1983 gubernatorial election in Bendel State, Nigeria

- August 13, 1983
Nominee	Samuel Ogbemudia	Ambrose Folorunsho Alli
Party	NPN	UPN
Governor before election
Ambrose Folorunsho Alli
UPN
Elected Governor
Samuel Ogbemudia
NPN

The 1983 Bendel State gubernatorial election occurred on August 13, 1983. NPN's Samuel Ogbemudia won election for a first term, defeating main opposition UPN candidate, Ambrose Alli, and other party candidates in the contest.

== Electoral system ==
The Governor of Bendel State is elected using the plurality voting system.

== Results ==
The NPN candidate, Samuel Ogbemudia defeated the Incumbent Governor, UPN's Ambrose Alli to win the contest.

Candidate	Party
Samuel Ogbemudia	National Party of Nigeria (NPN)
Ambrose Folorunsho Alli	Unity Party of Nigeria (UPN)
Total
