= 1991 Edo State gubernatorial election =

1991 gubernatorial election in Edo State, Nigeria

Edo gubernatorial election
- December 14, 1991
| Nominee | John Odigie Oyegun | Lucky Igbinedion |
| Party | SDP | NRC |
Elected Governor
John Odigie Oyegun
SDP

The 1991 Edo State gubernatorial election was held on 14 December 1991. SDP candidate John Odigie Oyegun won the election.

== Conduct ==
The gubernatorial election was conducted using an open ballot system. Primaries for the two parties to select their flag bearers were conducted on 19 October 1991.

The election occurred on 14 December 1991. SDP candidate John Odigie Oyegun won the election.
