= 2003 Edo State gubernatorial election =

2003 gubernatorial election in Edo State, Nigeria

- (Nigeria)
- 19 April 2003
Nominee	Lucky Igbinedion	Roland Owie
Party	PDP	ANPP
Running mate	Mike Oghiadomhe
Popular vote	969,747
Governor before election
Lucky Igbinedion
PDP
Elected Governor
Lucky Igbinedion
PDP

The 2003 Edo State gubernatorial election was held on 19 April 2003. Incumbent governor Lucky Igbinedion of the Peoples Democratic Party (PDP) won re-election for a second term, defeating Roland Owie of the All Nigeria Peoples Party (ANPP) and three other candidates.

Lucky Igbinedion emerged as the candidate in the PDP gubernatorial primary, with Mike Oghiadomhe as his running mate.

Roland Owie defeated Lucky Imasuen in the ANPP gubernatorial primary election to emerge the party's candidate.

== Electoral system ==
The governor of Edo State is elected using the plurality voting system. The governor is expected to serve a minimum of four years, and a maximum of eight years.

== Results ==
A total of five candidates registered with the Independent National Electoral Commission (INEC) to contest the election. incumbent PDP governor Lucky Igbinedion won re-election for a second term, defeating ANPP's Roland Owie and four minor party candidates.

The total number of registered voters in the state was 1,432,891. However, only 79.74% (i.e. 1,142,519) of registered voters participated in the exercise.

Candidate	Party	Votes	%
Lucky Igbinedion	Peoples Democratic Party (PDP)	969,747	100.00
Roland Owie	All Nigeria Peoples Party(ANPP)		
Odion Ohiorenua Ojo	Alliance for Democracy (AD)		
Clement Alele	United Nigeria People's Party (UNPP)		
Osagie Obayuwana	National Conscience Party (NCP)		
Total		969,747	100.00
Registered voters/turnout		1,432,891	–
Source: Gamji, Africa Update, Dawodu
