= Aremu =

- Gender: Male
- Language(s): Yoruba

Origin
- Word/name: Nigeria
- Meaning: Heir, first son, the heir of the family,

Aremu is a surname. Notable people with the surname include:

- Afeez Aremu (born 1999), Nigerian footballer
- Issa Aremu (born 1961), Nigerian trade union activist and labor leader
- Mike Aremu, Nigerian saxophone player

== See also ==
- Aremu (given name)
