= 2007 Edo State gubernatorial election =

Election in Nigeria

- 14 April 2007
Party	PDP	ACN
Popular vote	329,740	197,472
Governor before election
Lucky Igbinedion
PDP
Elected Governor
Oserheimen Osunbor
PDP

The 2007 Edo State gubernatorial election held on 14 April 2007 was the 4th gubernatorial election of Edo State. The Peoples Democratic Party nominee Oserheimen Osunbor won the election with 329,740 votes, defeating Adams Oshiomole of the Action Congress of Nigeria with 197,472 votes.

== Results ==
Oserheimen Osunbor from the People's Democratic Party won the election, defeating Adams Oshiomole from the Action Congress of Nigeria. Registered voters was 1,345,410.

2007 Edo State gubernatorial election
Party	Candidate	Votes	%	±%
PDP	Oserheimen Osunbor	329,740	0	
ACN	Adams Oshiomole	197,472	0	
PDP hold				
