= 2012 Edo State gubernatorial election =

2012 gubernatorial election in Edo State, Nigeria

- 14 July 2012
Nominee	Adams Oshiomhole	Charles Airhiavbere
Party	ACN	PDP
Running mate	Pius Odubu
Popular vote	477,478	144,255
Governor before election
Adams Oshiomhole
Action Congress of Nigeria
Elected Governor
Adams Oshiomhole
Action Congress of Nigeria

The 2012 Edo State gubernatorial election was held on 14 July 2012. The ACN nominee Adams Oshiomhole won for a second term, defeating Charles Airhiavbere of the PDP.

Adams Oshiomhole emerged ACN after he was returned as the sole candidate. He picked Pius Odubu as his running mate. Charles Airhiavbere was the PDP candidate.

== Electoral system ==
The Governor of Edo State is elected using the plurality voting system.

== Primary election ==
=== ACN primary ===
Adams Oshiomhole won the primary election after he emerged unopposed.

=== PDP primary ===
The PDP primary election was held on 5 February 2012. Charles Airhiavbere emerged PDP flag bearer.

== Results ==
A total number of seven candidates registered with the Independent National Electoral Commission to contest in the election.

Candidate	Party	Votes	%
Adams Oshiomhole	Action Congress of Nigeria	477,478	75.78
Charles Airhiavbere	People's Democratic Party	144,255	22.89
Solomon Edebiri	All Nigeria People's Party	3,642	0.58
Izevbuwa Roland	Congress for Progressive Change	2,793	0.44
Frank Ukonga	Social Democratic Mega party	807	0.13
Andrew Igwemoh	Labour Party	604	0.10
Paul Orumwense	National Conscience Party	540	0.09
Total		630,119	100.00
Source: Channels Tv News

The total number of 667,993 voters were accredited while total number of votes cast was 647,698.

=== By local government area ===
The results of the election by local government area for the two major parties are shown below. Seven political parties participated in the election. Blue represents LGAs won by Adams Oshiomhole. Green represents LGAs won by Charles Airhiavbere.

LGA	Adams Oshiomhole ACN		Charles Airhiavbere PDP		Total votes
LGA	#	%	#	%	#
Akoko Edo	29,803		13,785		
Egor	60,623		3,486		
Esan North-East	13,068		12,478		
Esan Central	9,751		6,758		
Esan South-East	14,904		9,634		
Esan West	13,499		13,282		
Etsako Central	16,834		5,113		
Etsako East	14,904		9,634		
Etsako West	44,962		5,920		
Igueben	9,751		6,758		
Ikpoba Okha	58,809		6,505		
Oredo	66,552		9,081		
Orhionmwon	26,163		8,716		
Ovia North-East	26,835		5,427		
Ovia South-West	15,150		7,229		
Owan East	22,483		11,709		
Owan West	15,150		7,229		
Uhunmwonde	17,011		5,826		
Totals	477,478		144,255		
