= 2003 Nigerian Senate elections in Edo State =

2003 Nigerian Senate election in Edo State

The 2003 Nigerian Senate election in Edo State was held on April 12, 2003, to elect members of the Nigerian Senate to represent Edo State. Victor Oyofo representing Edo North, Oserheimen Osunbor representing Edo Central and Daisy Danjuma representing Edo South all won on the platform of the Peoples Democratic Party.

== Overview ==
Affiliation	Party		Total
Affiliation	PDP	AD	Total
Before Election			3
After Election	3	0	3

== Summary ==
District	Incumbent	Party	Elected Senator	Party
Edo North			Victor Oyofo	PDP
Edo Central			Oserheimen Osunbor	PDP
Edo South			Daisy Danjuma	PDP

== Results ==
=== Edo North ===
The election was won by Victor Oyofo of the Peoples Democratic Party.

2003 Nigerian Senate election in Edo State
Party	Candidate	Votes	%
PDP	Victor Oyofo		
Total votes			
PDP hold			

=== Edo Central ===
The election was won by Oserheimen Osunbor of the Peoples Democratic Party.

2003 Nigerian Senate election in Edo State
Party	Candidate	Votes	%
PDP	Oserheimen Osunbor		
Total votes			
PDP hold			

=== Edo South ===
The election was won by Daisy Danjuma of the Peoples Democratic Party.

2003 Nigerian Senate election in Edo State
Party	Candidate	Votes	%
PDP	Daisy Danjuma		
Total votes			
PDP hold			
