= Tunde Ogbeha =

Nigerian politician (born 1947)

Brigadier general Tunde Ogbeha

Governor of Akwa Ibom State
- In office 28 September 1987 – 30 July 1988
- Succeeded by: Godwin Abbe

Governor of Bendel State
- In office Dec 1987 – Aug 1990
- Preceded by: John Mark Inienger
- Succeeded by: John Ewerekumoh Yeri

Senator of the Federal Republic of Nigeria
- In office May 1999 – May 2007
- Constituency: Kogi West

Personal details
- Born: Jonathan Tunde Ogbeha; 01-09-1947 (age 68–69) Lokoja, Northern Region, British Nigeria (now in Kogi State, Nigeria)
- Party: Peoples Democratic Party

Military service
- Allegiance: Nigeria
- Branch/service: Nigerian Army
- Rank: Brigadier general

Jonathan Tunde Ogbeha (born 1945) is a Nigerian politician and retired brigadier general who served as the administrator of Akwa Ibom State and then of Bendel State during the military rule of General Ibrahim Babangida (1985–1993). After the return to democracy in 1999, he was elected senator for the Kogi West constituency of Kogi State from May 1999 to May 2007. A biography on Ogbeha titled "Jonathan Tunde Ogbeha: A Noble Path" was written by Innocent Nzeke Waniko, a journalist, and presented publicly on 1 September 2017. The book chronicles the early life and comprehensively captures the life and career of Ogbeha.

== Birth and education ==
Ogbeha was born in Lokoja, Kogi State in 1947. After obtaining a West African School Certificate, he attended the Nigerian Military School in Zaria from 1962-1967. In 1967, Ogbeha entered the Nigerian Defence Academy where he was commissioned in 1970. In 1986, he attended National Institute of Policy and Strategic Studies in Kuru for a year.

== Military career ==
Tunde Ogbeha was commissioned second lieutenant in 1970. As a colonel in December 1983, he was involved in the military coup when President Shehu Shagari was replaced by Major-General Muhammadu Buhari. Ogbeha approached Captain Augustine A. Anyogo of the Brigade of Guards and told him to arrest the president at midnight. Anyogo refused and alerted his superior officer, who arranged for increased security around the State House. However, the coup succeeded despite these measures.

Ogbeha played a prominent role in the subsequent coup of August 1985, when General Ibrahim Babangida ousted Buhari's government.

Brigadier Ibrahim Bako was the other senior army officer and coup conspirator who accompanied Colonel Ogbeha to arrest President Shagari during the coup. Bako was killed under murky circumstances, likely cross fire and confusion that ensued between the Brigade of Guards loyal to President Shagari and the army detachment accompanying Bako and Ogbeha to arrest President Shagari.

In 1985, he was appointed an ambassador to Equatorial Guinea.

In 1987, he was appointed military governor of the newly formed Akwa Ibom State. In 1988, he was appointed military governor of the now defunct Bendel State.

Reminiscing about the period, Ogbeha said that he was not in the vanguard for the 1991 creation of Kogi State, but helped in its creation because he was a trusted advisor of President Ibrahim Babangida.

He voluntary retired as a brigadier-general in 1993, after Babangida stepped down from power.

== Senate career ==
In 1998, Ogbeha and his close friend General David Medaese Jemibewon, a former military governor of Oyo State, were a team in Kogi State. In the April 1999 elections, Ogbeha ran for the Senate and was elected to represent Kogi West on the platform of Peoples Democratic Party (PDP), while Jemibewon obtained the ministerial post allocated to Kogi State in the new government.

In 2003, Ogbeha and David Jemibewon were rivals for the Kogi West PDP senate candidacy. However, Ogbeha was backed by president Olusegun Obasanjo.

He was chosen as PDP candidate and reelected to the Senate in April 2003.

Ogbeha was appointed chairman of the Senate Committee on Water Resources, in which role he attended the Fourth World Water Forum, March 16–22, 2006, in Mexico City.

In a December 2005 interview, Ogbeha said "The constitution was made without the thought that we will have cowboys who will operate it and these cowboys are bringing us shame and disgrace". He strongly criticized the current leaders for wanton and unbridled corruption.

As senator for Kogi West, Ogbeha advocated a new Kogi State comprising the Okun Yorubas and the people of Kogi Central. He said that the people of Kogi East should constitute a separate state.

He chose not to run for another term in 2007.

Outgoing President Olusegun Obasanjo had been campaigning for Tunde Ogbeha to become National Secretary of the PDP, which may have been the reason for Ogbeha' decision, but eventually he gave his support to Alhaji Abubakar Kawu Baraje as PDP secretary.

== Later career ==
After leaving the Senate, Ogbeha became Chairman of the Confluence Cable Network, Kogi State's first private broadcasting station.

He also became a member of the board of Falcon Securities, a stock brokerage established by Peter Ukuoritsemofe Ololo in 1993. Ololo was arrested in 2009 by the Economic and Financial Crimes Commission on charges that a huge portion of the loans taken by Ololo's firms were carried out illegally. Ogbeha was not implicated in the charges.

In July 2009, President Umaru Musa Yar'Adua appointed Tunde Ogbeha to the Board of the Niger Delta Development Commission, representing the non-oil-producing North Central region.
