= John Ewerekumoh Yeri =

Nigerian governor

Governor of Bendel State
- In office August 1990 – August 1991
- Preceded by: Jonathon Tunde Ogbeha

Governor of Edo State
- In office August 1991 – January 1992
- Succeeded by: John Odigie Oyegun

John Ewerekumoh Yeri was a Nigerian soldier who served as Governor of Bendel State between 1990 and 1991, and then continued as Governor of Edo State until January 1992 after Bendel State was split into Edo State and Delta State. He was military governor during the administration of General Ibrahim Babangida, and handed over to an elected civilian governor in January 1992.

In a speech in December 1991, he said that the Military Administration held traditional rulers in high esteem, and expected them to enlighten their subjects about Government policies and programs at the grass root level. During his tenure, the administration made some investment in improving the roads of the state.
