= 1999 Edo State gubernatorial election =

1999 gubernatorial election in Edo State, Nigeria

- 9 January 1999
Nominee	Lucky Igbinedion	Lucky Imasuen
Party	PDP	APP
Popular vote	556,871	249,688
Governor before election
John Odigie Oyegun
SDP
Elected Governor
Lucky Igbinedion
PDP

The 1999 Edo State gubernatorial election was held on 9 January 1999. The PDP nominee Lucky Igbinedion won the election, defeating the APP candidate, Lucky Imasuen.

Lucky Igbinedion emerged PDP candidate.

== Electoral system ==
The Governor of Edo State is elected using the plurality voting system.

== Primary election ==
=== PDP primary ===
The PDP primary election was won by Lucky Igbinedion.

== Results ==
The total number of registered voters in the state was 1,414,511. Total number of votes cast was 827,563, while number of valid votes was 815,554. Rejected votes were 12,009.

Candidate	Party	Votes	%
Lucky Igbinedion	People's Democratic Party	556,871	69.04
Lucky Imasuen	All People's Party	249,688	30.96
Total		806,559	100.00
Valid votes		806,559	98.53
Invalid/blank votes		12,009	1.47
Total votes		818,568	100.00
Registered voters/turnout		1,414,511	57.87
Source: Nigeria World, IFES, Semantics Scholar
