= Onuka =

Onuka may refer to:

- Onuka Station, a railway station in Hiroshima Prefecture, Japan
- Mohammed Abul-Salam Onuka, a Nigerian soldier who served as Military Administrator of Edo State
- Onuka (band), a Ukrainian electronic music group
