= Emmanuel Aluyor =

Nigerian professor and vice-chancellor

- Other name: Osikhuemeh
- Occupations: Academic; Researcher; Engineer

Academic background
- Education: University of Benin, Benin City

Academic work
- Discipline: Chemical Engineer
- Institutions: Edo State University

Emmanuel Aluyor is a Nigerian professor of chemical engineering and university administrator. He is the Vice chancellor of Mudiame University, Edo State, a position he took up in August 2025. He previously served as vice-chancellor of Edo State University, Uzairue (formerly Edo University Iyamho), from 2016 to June 2024, first as acting vice-chancellor and later as substantive vice-chancellor from 2018.

== Education ==
Aluyor started his academic journey at Kirikasama Primary School, Maiduguri and finished in 1980. He completed his secondary school education at Our Lady of Fatima College, Auchi in 1985 and then obtained a Bachelors degree in chemical engineering from the University of Benin in 1990. Thereafter he obtained his Masters degree in 1993 and PhD in 2008 from the same university (UNIBEN)

== Career ==
He began his academic career as Lecturer II at the University of Benin in 1994.

== Awards ==
In 2020, he was honoured by the Federation of African Engineering Organizations (FAEO) at its General Assembly and Investiture Award Ceremony.
