= Issa Aremu =

Nigerian trade union activist and labor leader

Issa Obalowu Aremu
- Born: Issa Obalowu Aremu born January 8, 1961
- Education: University of Port Harcourt
- Occupation: Trade Union Activist

Issa Obalowu Aremu Pronounciation(born January 8, 1961) is a Nigerian trade union activist and labor leader. He is the general secretary of the National Union of Textile, Garment and Tailoring Workers of Nigeria (NVTGTWN) and vice president of the IndustriALL Global Union. Comrade Issa Aremu is a member of the executive council of the Nigerian Labour Congress, and served as the vice president of the congress during the tenure of Adams Oshiomole.

== Career ==
Aremu attended the Ilorin Primary School and completed his secondary school education at the Ilorin Grammar School, Oko erin, Garin Alimi, Ilorin, Kwara State. Aremu graduated with B.sc Honors in Economics at the University of Port Harcourt, Rivers state in 1985. He is an alumnus of the George Meany Labour Centre, Maryland, Washington, USA and holds a master's degree in Labour and Development from the Institute of Social Studies, ISS, in the Hague, Netherlands. Aremu joined the Labour movement as Head of the Economic/Research Department of the NLC. Aremu joined the Labour movement as Head of the Economic/Research Department of NLC. In August 1989, he joined NUTGTWN and became its General Secretary in 2009. He was the labour delegate to the National Conference held in 2014 and served as the deputy chairman of the National Conference Committee on Civil Society, Labour, Youth, and Sports.

== Politics ==
On June 18, 2018, he declared his bid for Kwara state governorship on the platform of the Labour Party during the 2019 general elections.

== Personal life ==
Aremu was born on January 8, 1961, in Ijagbo around present-day Oyun, Kwara State, to Mahamudu Aremu and Hadjia Afusatu Amoke Aremu. Comrade Issa Aremu was married to Hadjia Hamdalat Abiodun Aremu, who died in December 2015. He is currently married to Khadijat Aremu.
