= George N. Alily =

Former naval officer

- Born: George Nnadozie Alily; 20 September 1960 (age 66); Lagos Island, Nigeria
- Education: Nigerian Defence Academy, Kaduna, National War College, Nigeria, American University, Washington DC
- Occupation: Security risk management consultant
- Spouse: Grace Alily
- Children: George Jr and Chijioke

George Nnadozie Alily (born 20 September 1960) is a former naval officer, author, inspirational speaker and maritime security consultant.

== Early life ==
Alily was born 20 September 1960 at the Island Maternity Hospital in Lagos Island to Major Ohawady and Regina “Queen” Alily. Following the outbreak of the Nigerian Civil War, his family relocated to their home town of Lorji in Aboh-Mbaise of Imo State. He attended Lorji Community School for his primary education. From 1973 to 1978, he attended the Nigerian Military School, Zaria, Kaduna State for his secondary education.

== Military training and education ==
In 1979, Alily proceeded to the Nigerian Defence Academy, Kaduna, as a member of 25th Regular Course. Upon graduation in 1981, he underwent his Midshipman Sea training on board the NNS ARADU, a frigate in Germany. Commissioned a sub-lieutenant in January 1983, he attended the Sub-lieutenant Technical Course in Cochin, India from 1983 to 1984. In 1985, Alily attended the Young Officers Course in Intelligence at the Nigerian Army Intelligence School, Apapa. He also undertook Basic and Advanced Intelligence Equipment Courses in Hamburg, Germany in 1985 and 1986 respectively. For his Junior Staff Course, Alily attended the Armed Forces Command and Staff College, Jaji in 1989. From 1989 to 1990, he underwent the Officer Long Course at NNS QUORRA, Lagos, specialising in Navigation and Direction, and General Warfare. He also attended the Ghana Armed Forces Command and Staff College, Teshie-Accra from 1995 to 1996 for his senior staff course. From September 2006 to August 2007, he attended the National War College, Nigeria.

Alily holds a Master's degree in international service (MIS), majoring in international peace and conflict resolution (IPCR) from the American University in Washington, D.C. He also holds a postgraduate certificate in public administration from the Ghana Institute of Management and Public Administration (GIMPA). He is a member of the Royal Institute of Navigation in London, a life member of the US Naval Institute, and a fellow of the National War College, Nigeria.

== Naval service ==
As a seaman officer, Alily held several appointments, ashore and afloat. Some of these included watch keeping duties on board the Navy’s Fast Attack Craft (Missile) – NNS AGU, AYAM and SIRI. He was the aide-de-camp to the military governor Imo State (1986–87). He was also the navigating officer of NNS ERIN-OMI, corvette, which was deployed to Liberia for peace support operations under the auspices of the ECOWAS Monitoring Group Naval Task Force. In addition, Alily was the executive officer of NNS ENYIMIRI, another corvette. He was an instructor and later, officer-in-charge, Navigation and Direction School, Apapa, Lagos. He held the appointments as officer-in-charge, Directorate of Naval Intelligence Annex, Apapa as well as staff officer intelligence at the Naval Headquarters. In 1998, he was appointed deputy director of research and development, Defence Intelligence Agency.

Furthermore, from 1999 to 2002, Alily was appointed as the naval attaché (deputy defence adviser, Navy) of the Embassy of Nigeria, Washington, D.C. On return to Nigeria, he served briefly as the staff officer plans at the Policy and Plans Branch of the Nigerian Naval Headquarters in Abuja, and returned to the United States for sea command. Alily commanded NNS Kyanwa, an auxiliary employed for maritime law enforcement and surveillance in the Niger Delta maritime area from 2002 to 2004. As the pioneer commanding officer of NNS Kyanwa, he joined the ship in Homer, Alaska, took over command in San Pedro, California and sailed to Lagos, Nigeria. After his duty tour, he was awarded the "command-at-sea" badge. Similarly, for command ashore, he commanded NNS Beecroft, Nigerian Navy's premier operational shore base from 14 June 2004 to 26 August 2005. After both commands, he was posted to the Nigerian Defence Academy as the principal staff officer (coordination).

== Premature retirement ==
Alily was prematurely retired from the Nigerian Navy on 12 March 2007 while at the War College during the administration of Vice Admiral GTA Adekeye. A highly controversial and contentious retirement, it was challenged in court. On 4 October 2013, the National Industrial Court presided by Justice BA Adejumo ruled that his retirement was illegal and unlawful, rendering it null and void. The court ordered his reinstatement into service, but Alily opted to voluntarily retire.

== Personal life ==
George Alily was born to the family of Major Felix Ohawady and Queen Regina Alily of Lorji, Aboh-Mbaise. He comes from a family of six siblings, three brothers and two sisters. His father was an army officer while his mother was a home maker. Alily comes from a family of military service. Apart from his father who was a military officer, his eldest brother is a retired Brigadier-General. He also has close relatives who served in the military. He is married to Grace Chizomam (Nee Eke), a lawyer and social advocate. They were married on 9 April 1988, and have two sons, George Nkemakolam “Kem” and Chijioke “Chiji” Kelechi.

== Literary works ==
Alily has written many articles for newspapers and other publications. He is the author of two books titled Naval Diplomacy: A Critical Component of National Power and Defining Persona: 6 virtues that Transform Societies.
