= Anthony Onyearugbulem =

Nigerian politician and Navy officer

Anthony Ibe Onyearugbulem

Military Administrator of Ondo State
- In office 22 August 1996 – 7 August 1998
- Preceded by: Ahmed Usman
- Succeeded by: Moses Fasanya

Military Administrator of Edo State
- In office 7 August 1998 – 29 May 1999
- Preceded by: Baba Adamu Iyam
- Succeeded by: Lucky Igbinedion

Personal details
- Born: 9 July 1955 Ikeduru, Imo State, Nigeria
- Died: 26 July 2002 (aged 47)

Military service
- Allegiance: Nigeria
- Branch/service: Nigerian Navy
- Rank: Navy captain

Anthony Ibe Onyearugbulem // (9 July 1955 – 26 July 2002) was a Nigerian navy captain who served as military administrator of Ondo State from August 1996 to August 1998, during the military regime of General Sani Abacha. He then became military administrator of Edo State in August 1998, handing over power to the civilian governor, Lucky Igbinedion, in May 1999.

== Background ==
Anthony Ibe Onyearugbulem was born on 9 July 1955 in Owalla Avuvu in Ikeduru, Imo State. He was educated at St. Columbia's Secondary School, Amaimo (1970–1972) and Enyiogugu High School, Mbaise (1972–1974). He joined the navy and was commissioned on 1 July 1978.

== Military administrator ==
Onyearugbulem served as military administrator of Ondo State from August 1996 to August 1998. As administrator of Ondo State, he caused resentment among the Auga people by presenting the staff of office to the Alani of Idoani, a person said by some to have no royal blood. His administration undertook extensive roadworks in Ondo State, and this is the legacy he is commonly remembered for.

He was promoted navy captain in July 1998 and was posted to Edo State on 7 August 1998, as the military administrator. He tried to make chairmanship of the council of Obas in Edo State a rotational position, an affront to the king of the ancient Benin Kingdom. In an attempt to increase voters' registration before the scheduled transition to democracy, Onyearugbulem warned that parents and guardians would have to produce their registration cards for their children to be admitted to state schools.

== Later career ==
He was made to retire in 1999 shortly after the advent of civilian rule, along with others who had held political appointments in the military government. In 2002, Onyearugbulem left the Peoples Democratic Party (PDP) and declared his intention to contest the 2003 gubernatorial election in Imo State on the platform of the All Nigeria Peoples Party (ANPP). Later that year, Onyearugbulem died suddenly in a hotel room in Kaduna in somewhat mysterious circumstances.
