= Baba Adamu Iyam =

Nigerian politician

Baba Iyam

Military Administrator of Kwara State
- In office 14 September 1994 – 22 August 1996
- Preceded by: Mustapha Ismail
- Succeeded by: Peter Ogar

Military Administrator of Edo State
- In office 22 August 1996 – 7 August 1998
- Preceded by: Colonel Bassey Asuquo
- Succeeded by: Navy Captain Anthony Onyearugbulem

Personal details
- Born: Otukpo, Benue state

Baba Adamu Iyam (born September 5, 1948, in Otukpo, Benue state) was a Nigerian soldier who served as Military Administrator of Kwara State between September 1994 and August 1996, and then Edo State from August 1996 to August 1998, during the military regime of General Sani Abacha.

Group Captain Iyam reportedly sacked 8,000 Edo state workers, most of them the teachers that Prof Ambrose Alli had painstakingly groomed, invested in and nurtured. In February 1997, he halted all grants to the Edo State University since he considered that government ought not fund universities, and appointed a Sole Administrator for the university which will report directly to him alone, which he have a very good reason for.

== Tenure ==
Group Captain Baba Adamu Iyam, served as Governor of Kwara State from August 1994 to August 1996, oversaw a period of mass mobilization for self-help development. The administration engaged private developers to complete Kwara House in Abuja, which would generate revenue for the government and reduce the cost of hotel accommodation for state officials in the federal capital. The administration also constructed boreholes and functional latrines across the state, in partnership with UNICEF and DFRRI. The Stadium Shopping Complex was also built to improve revenue generation. However, Iyam's administration will most likely be remembered for its reclassification of Kwara State as an "educationally disadvantaged state," which would help attract more attention and investment from the Federal Government for educational development.
