= Biodun Ogunbiyi =

Nigerian politician

Biodun Ogunbiyi is a Nigerian politician from Ogun State. He was a member of the All Nigeria Peoples Party, but left the party in 2006 with a faction to found Democratic People's Party following a dispute that led to the suspension of the Deputy National Chairman, North, Jeremiah Useni in 2006.

In October 2004, convoys carrying Ogun State Governor Gbenga Daniel and his wife were attacked in Ilaro, Ogun State. Governor Daniel accused the former governor of the state, Aremo Olusegun Osoba, of organizing the attack. Ogunbiyi described the allegation as "sheer deceit and hypocrisy". In March 2006, Ogunbiyi said that the poor rating of Ogun State in the States Economic Empowerment and Development Strategy report showed that Gbenga Daniel's administration thrived on propaganda. Ogunbiyi described a November 2008 dispute between Ogun State Governor Gbenga Daniel and Senator Iyabo Obasanjo-Bello as "not only an embarrassment but a disgrace to the peace-loving people of the Gateway State of Nigeria."

In 2006, he became a founding member of the Democratic People's Party (DPP), along with Alhaji Attahiru Bafarawa, former Sokoto State governor and a 2007 presidential candidate, and retired general Jeremiah Useni.

In December 2008, he was named Chairman of the Interim Executive Committee of the Democratic Peoples Party at a meeting where Jeremiah Useni was suspended indefinitely for abuse of power and non-performance. Jeremiah Useni rejected the decision, and claimed that Ogunbiyi had been expelled from the party in August 2008, after openly declaring for the Peoples Democratic Party (PDP) at a rally in Sokoto. Useni later claimed that the Sokoto State government was using the faction to withdraw all DPP court cases against Sokoto Governor Aliyu Wamakko.

Alhaji Attahiru Bafarawa said that the suspension of Useni was illegal, as did National Publicity Secretary Alhaji Ismaila Sani. However, Secretary of the Democratic Peoples Party, Alhaji Abubakar Aminu, supported Ogunbiyi's appointment. In January, National Publicity Secretary Dr Anyigor Vincent condemned the courtesy visit that Alhaji Attahiru Bafarawa paid on President Umaru Musa Yar'Adua during the 2007 polls.
