= Iyamho =

Village in Edo State, Nigeria

Iyamho is a small town in Etsako West local government area of Edo State, Nigeria. It is located along Auchi - Abuja road after Elele - Uzairue. Edo State University, Iyamho (Formerly Edo University Iyamho (EUI) and Edo State University Uzairue (EDSU)) is located here. Iyamho is one of the 21 towns/villages that constitute Uzairue clan in Etsako West, Edo State. The major religion include Christianity, Islam and traditional. It is the home of Senator Adams Oshiomole, a notable politician, former Governor of Edo State and former Chairman of All Progressive Party (APC)[3].

The distance between Iyamho and Abuja, the Nigeria capital is 317.8 km (or 5 hours and 20 minutes drive); Iyamho to Benin City, the capital of Edo State is 170.6 km (or 2 hours and 46 minutes drive ) and Auchi is 20.1 km (27 minutes).

The postcode is 312102

== Notable people ==
- Adams Oshiomole, Nigerian politician
