= Abdulkadir Shehu =

Acting Administrator of Delta State
- In office 17 November 1993 – 10 December 1993
- Preceded by: Felix Ibru
- Succeeded by: Bassey Asuquo

Alhaji Abdulkadir Shehu was acting Administrator of Delta State, Nigeria between November 17, 1993 and December 10, 1993 immediately after General Sani Abacha had assumed power from the civilian government. Shehu was Delta State Commissioner of Police, and filled in after the elected governor had been dismissed until Colonel Bassey Asuquo was appointed administrator.
