= Edo University, Iyamho =

University in Edo State, Nigeria

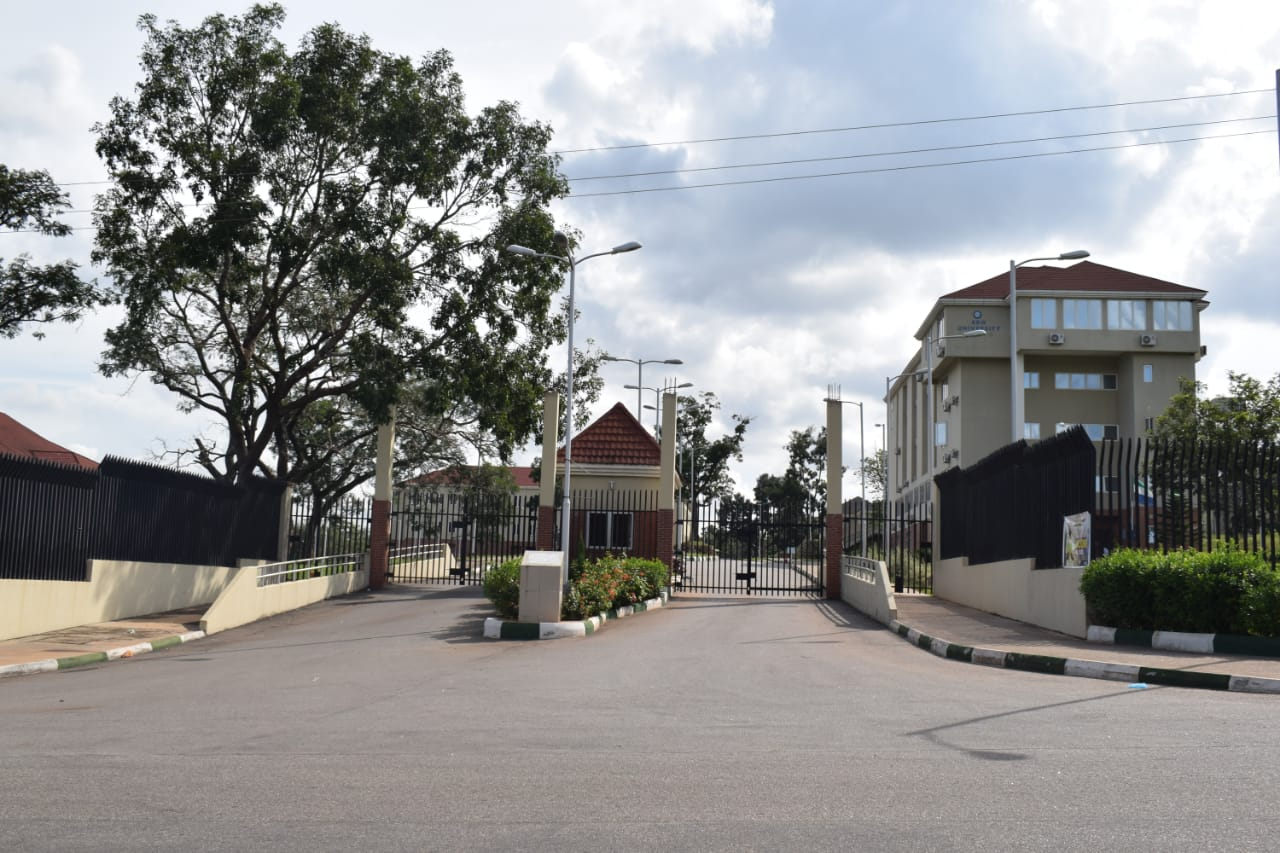
- Edo University Main Entrance
- Former names: Edo State University, Uzairue
- Type: Public
- Established: 2016
- Academic affiliations: National Universities Commission
- Budget: ₦30billion
- Location: Iyamho, Edo State, Nigeria
- Campus: Urban
- Language: English
- Website: edouniversity.edu.ng

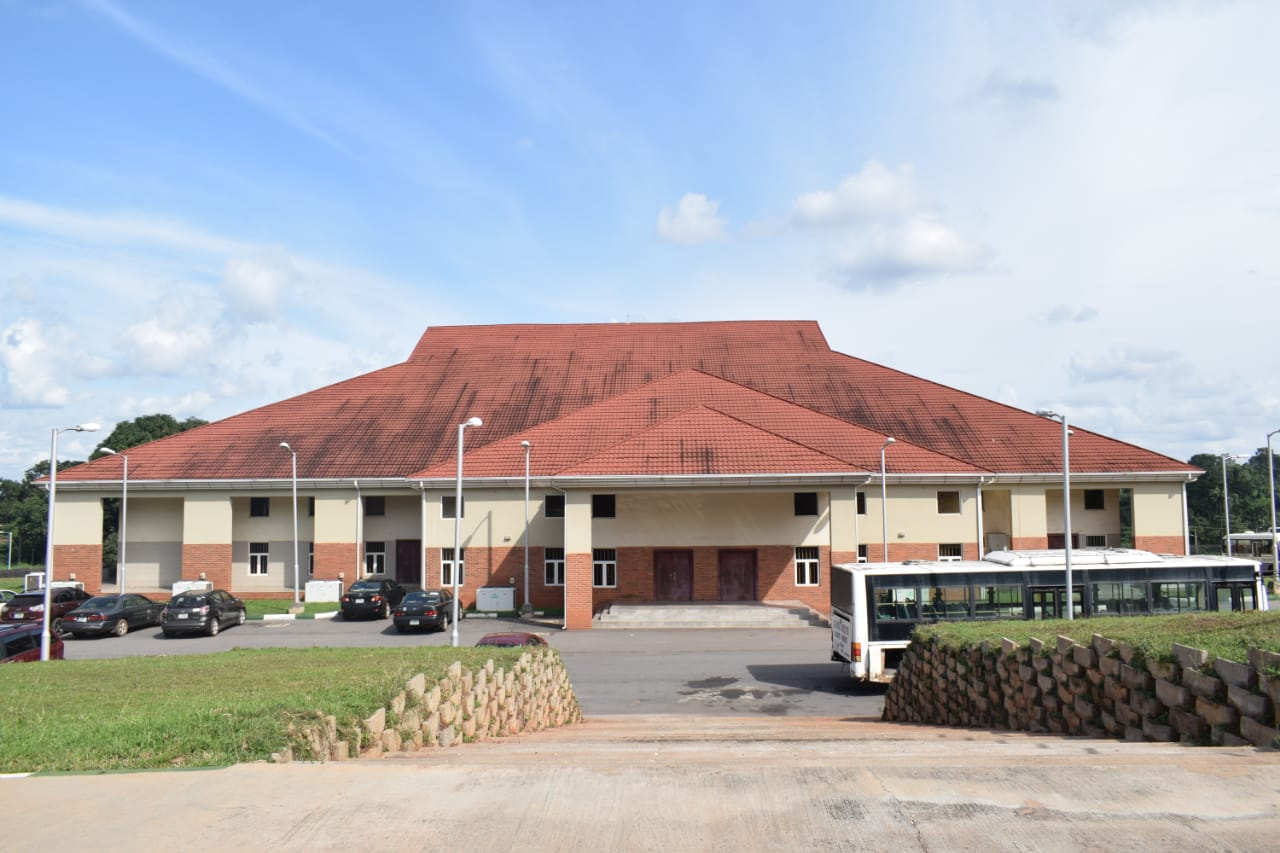
Edo University Senate Building

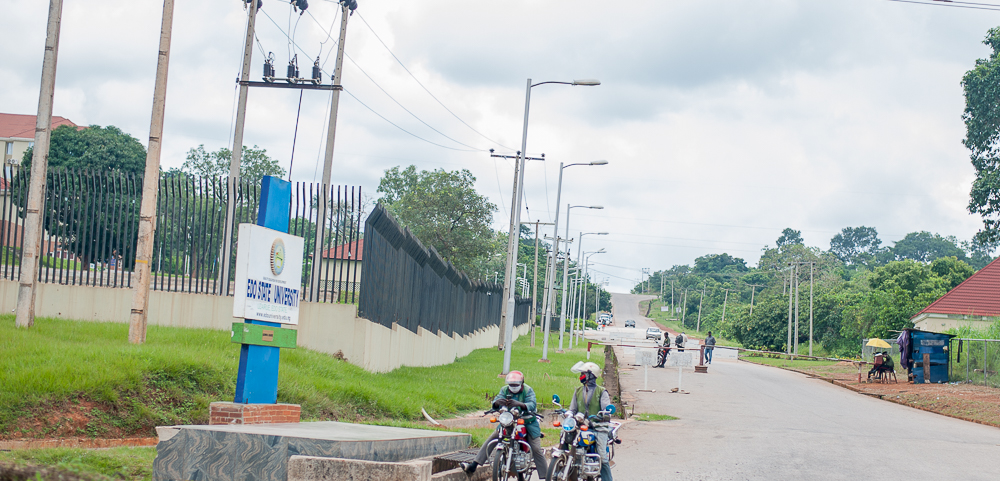
Edo University, Iyamho, Edo state gate2

Edo University, Iyamho (abbreviated EDI) is a state government-owned tertiary institution founded in 2016. Formerly known as Edo State University, Uzairue, it is located in Iyamho, a town in Etsako West local government area of Edo State, Nigeria.

In December 2024, the Edo state governor Senator Monday Okpebholo approved the renaming of the university from Edo State University, Uzairue, to Edo University, Iyamho. On 23 March 2016, the university was approved by the National Universities Commission as Nigeria's 41st state university. Edo University offers undergraduate, postgraduate and research programmes.

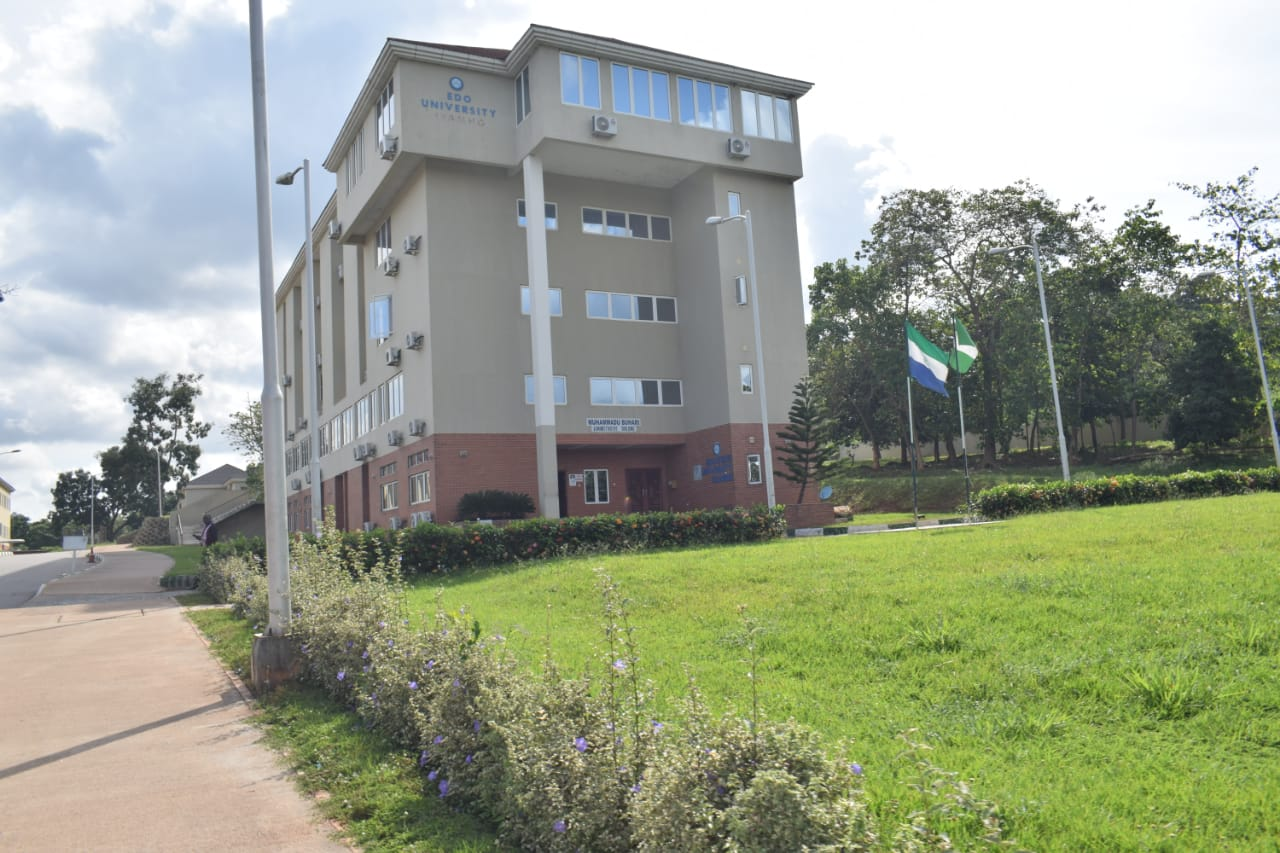
Edo University Administrative Building

== History ==
On 27 March 2014, the Edo State House of Assembly passed a bill for the establishment of a University of Science and Technology at Uzairue. The university was however changed to Edo University and its location to Iyamho.

== Ranking and achievement ==
In 2018, the university was ranked first among State government owned Universities and third University in Nigeria in the first ever Open Educational Resources (OER) conducted by National Universities Commission (NUC) Institutional repository.

== Criticism ==
Upon the establishment of Edo University, the Governor of Edo State Adams Oshiomole was criticized by some section of the press. Francis Akhigbe of THISDAYLive cited "personal interest" as the reason why Oshiomole established the university . The media also felt there was no need to establish a university when other tertiary institutions in the state were already in bad condition.

== Vice Chancellors ==
- Emmanuel Aluyor, 2016–June 2024 is a professor of chemical engineering
- Prof. Dawood Egbefo, since 2024. Professor of History and International Studies
- Prof. Victor Adetimirin, since 2025. Professor of Agronomy

== University library ==
Edo University's library provides a devoted, specialized, and approachable service across the campus. The university’s informational resources, both in print and online/offline formats, support the teaching and exploration activities of the institution.
