= Roland Owie =

Pioneer Senate Majority Chief Whip Of The Nigerian Senate

Senator Roland Stephen Owie KSJI
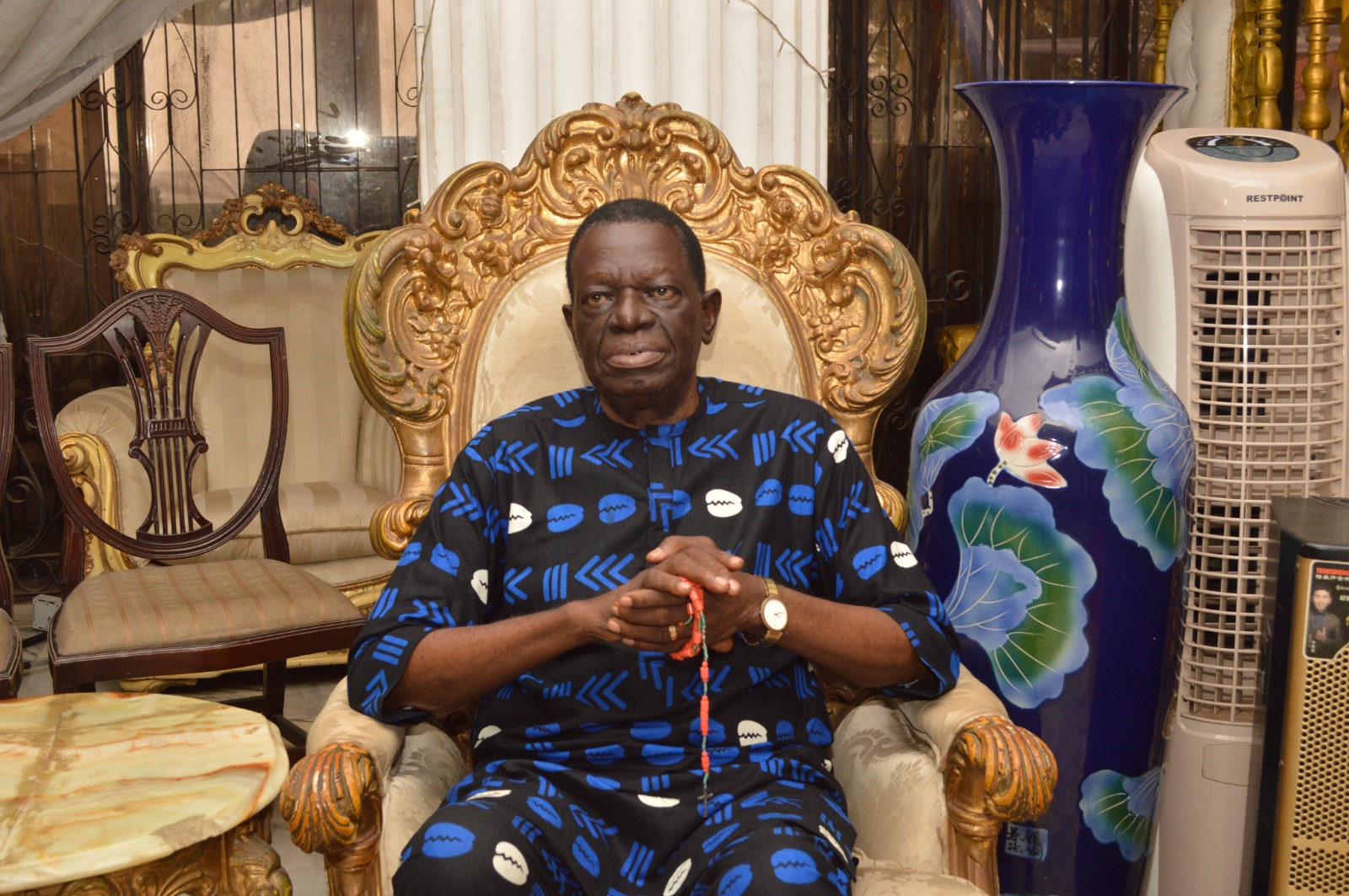
- Roland Stephen Owie

Senate Majority Chief Whip
- In office 1999–2000

Senator for Edo South Senatorial District
- In office 1999–2003
- Succeeded by: Daisy Danjuma

Deputy Chief Whip, House of Representatives
- In office 1978–1983

Personal details
- Born: 28 August 1945 (age 80) Ilobi village, Isi community, Edo State, Nigeria
- Party: African Democratic Congress (ADC)
- Other political affiliations: United Party of Nigeria (1978–1983); Peoples Democratic Party (1999–2018; 2020–2025); Action Democratic Party (2018–2020)
- Spouse: Helen Noyo Owie (m. 1975–2025)
- Children: 13
- Education: B.A. (Hons) Geography, Ahmadu Bello University
- Occupation: Politician, businessman

Roland Stephen Owie KSJI is from Ilobi village in isi community. He was elected Senator for the Edo South Senatorial District of Edo State, Nigeria at the start of the Nigerian Fourth Republic, running on the People's Democratic Party (PDP) platform. He took office on 29 May 1999. Owie is the pioneer chief whip of the Senate after forming a team with then President of the Senate, Chuba Okadigbo. Prior to him being a senator, he was elected to the House of Representatives in 1979

After taking his seat in the Senate he was appointed to committees on Selection, Senate Services, Power & Steel, Agriculture, Water Resources and Drug & Narcotics.

Roland Stephen Owie also contested in the 2003 Governorship Election on the party ANPP but was defeated by Lucky Igbinedion. Roland Owie introduced the bill that established the Nigerian Security Civil Defense Corps (NSCDC).
