= Aremu (given name) =

Aremu is a given name. Notable people with the name include:

- Aremu Afeez (born 1999), Nigerian footballer
- Aremu Afolayan (born 1980), Nigerian film actor

== See also ==
- Aremu, surname
