= Frank Oputa-Otutu =

Nigerian politician

Frank Oputa-Otutu was a Nigerian politician who was a parliamentarian during the First Republic. He was a member of the NCNC political party and led the Aboh division of the party. Oputa-Otutu was a senator of the Federal republic of Nigeria in 1964.

Oputa-Otutu studied at Yaba School of Pharmacy between 1937 and 1941, and he later established his own drugstore in 1947.

Prior to Nigeria's independence in 1960, he was a member of the Western House of Assembly and at one point, he was selected as a minority whip of the house. After the First Republic was truncated, Oputa-Otutu was nominated as Commissioner of Establishments in the Mid-Western State.

In 1966, along with Shehu Shagari and Hon Olaniran, they represented Nigeria at the Commonwealth Parliamentary Association's Conference where he talked about a continued focus on South Africa's racial problems upon the exit of the country from the commonwealth.
