= National Union of Textile, Garment and Tailoring Workers of Nigeria =

Nigerian trade union

The National Union of Textile, Garment and Tailoring Workers of Nigeria (NUTGTWN) is a trade union representing workers in various related industries in Nigeria.

== History ==
The union was established in 1977, when the Nigerian government restructured trade unions on an industrial basis. 34 unions merged into the NUTGTWN, including the KTL African Workers' Union and the Ikeja Textile Workers' Union. In 1978, it was a founding affiliate of the Nigeria Labour Congress.

In 1988, the union had 41,312 members, which fell to 30,000 by 2005, reflecting the decline in employment in the industry. Members were concentrated in Lagos, Kano and Kaduna. However, by 2016, membership had grown to 35,000, with about 15,000 being self-employed tailors.

== General Secretaries ==
1982: Adams Oshiomhole
2009: Issa Aremu
