= John Mark Inienger =

Nigerian politician

Major General John Mark Inienger

Commander, ECOMOG Peacekeeping Force, Liberia
- In office December 1993 – August 1996
- Preceded by: Maj-Gen. J.Shagaya
- Succeeded by: Maj-Gen. V.Malu

Governor of Bendel State
- In office August 1985 – December 1988
- Preceded by: Jeremiah Timbut Useni
- Succeeded by: Jonathan Tunde Ogbeha

Personal details
- Born: 16 April 1945 Mbaduku, Vandeikya LGA, Benue State, Nigeria
- Died: 8 February 2002 (aged 56)
- Education: Nigerian Military School; Nigerian Defence Academy

Military service
- Branch/service: Nigerian Army
- Rank: Major General

John Mark Inienger (16 April 1945 – 8 February 2002) was a Nigerian Army major general who served as ECOMOG field commander in Liberia, governor of Bendel State between 1985 and 1988, during the military administration of General Ibrahim Babangida, and commander of the Brigade of Guards.

== Background ==
Inienger was born on 16 April 1945 at Mbaduku, Vandeikya local government area of Benue State. His father was Tiv from Mbaduku, and his mother was from Bebuabung in the Cross River State town of Obudu. Inienger was educated at the Mkar Primary School from 1952-1959, Nigerian Military School, Zaria from 1960-1963; Nigerian Army School of Electrical and Mechanical Engineering, Lagos from 1963-1964; Nigerian Defence Academy, Kaduna in 1967 and the Canadian Land Force Command and Staff College, Kingston, Ontario, Canada in 1974.

== Military career ==
After completing his emergency commission at the Nigerian Defence Academy, Inienger fought in the Nigerian Civil War in the 22nd Infantry Battalion from 1967-1969. During this time, his commanding officer was Mamman Vatsa, and he also became close with Ibrahim Babangida who served in a neighbouring unit. Inienger then served as Battalion Commander of the 29th Infantry Battalion in 1969.

After the war, Inienger was battalion commander of the 82 Infantry Battalion (1970–1973), instructor at the Nigerian Army School of Infantry (1975–1976) and battalion commander of the 31 Infantry (1976–1977). He was battalion commander of the Nigerian Battalion to Lebanon (1980–1981) and commander of the 4 Mechanized Brigade (1984–1985).

In August 1985 General Ibrahim Babangida became the military ruler of Nigeria after a coup against Muhammadu Buhari. Lt. Colonel Inienger was instrumental in the coup, and was rewarded by being appointed military governor of Bendel State, a position he held until December 1988.

Later posts were commander of the Brigade of Guards at Nigerian Army Headquarters, Lagos (1988–1989) and ECOMOG field commander in Liberia (1993–1996). During his period as ECOMOG commander during the First Liberian Civil War, conditions were chaotic as warlords sought to capture sufficient territory to be rewarded after the eventual peace. Inienger was quoted as saying "There was an orchestrated campaign of calumny against ECOMOG to discredit it, its neutrality, and impartiality ... ECOMOG was being described as an army of occupation". By April 1996 his troops were hard pressed to maintain control in the capital, Monrovia, against militiamen engaged in looting. Inienger returned from Liberia in 1996 and was appointed commandant of the Armed Forces Command and Staff College, Jaji.

== Retirement ==
In May 1999, the military handed over to the civilian government headed by Olusegun Obasanjo. Within a month, the new government ordered that all officers who had served in the military government for more than six months must retire. Inienger was among 100 officers affected by this decision. He died on 8 February 2002 while travelling by car from Jos to Makurdi.
