= Bassey Asuquo =

Former military administrator of Edo State

Brigadier General Bassey Asuquo CON

Military Administrator of Delta State
- In office 10 December 1993 – 26 September 1994
- Preceded by: Abdulkadir Shehu
- Succeeded by: Ibrahim Kefas

Military Administrator of Edo State
- In office 14 September 1994 – 22 August 1996
- Preceded by: Mohammed Abul-Salam Onuka
- Succeeded by: Baba Adamu Iyam

Bassey Asuquo was a Nigerian soldier who served as Military Administrator of Delta State between December 1993 and September 1994, and then Edo State from September 1994 to December 1996, during the military regime of General Sani Abacha. He retired as a brigadier general.

In 2008, he was Clan Head of Anim Ankiong Clan Council of Odukpani Local Government area in Cross River State. He testified before the House Committee on Power and Steel investigating funds paid for the Calabar 561MW GT power station, saying that the project delays were caused by the contractors and were not due to resistance from the community. In September 2009 he was appointed chairman of the board of the Federal Psychiatric Hospital, Calabar.

== Education ==
He attended Hussey College Warri.
