= George Agbazika Innih =

Nigerian politician and general (1938–2002)

Major General George Agbazika Innih

General Officer Commanding 1 Division Nigerian Army
- In office October 1979 – April 1980
- Preceded by: Brig P.A. Eromobor
- Succeeded by: Maj-Gen. D.N. Jemibewon

Governor, Bendel State, Nigeria
- In office August 2, 1975 – March 1976
- Preceded by: Samuel Ogbemudia
- Succeeded by: Husaini Abdullahi

Governor, Kwara State, Nigeria
- In office 1976–1978
- Preceded by: Ibrahim Taiwo
- Succeeded by: Sunday Ifere

Personal details
- Born: September 25, 1938 Agenebode, Etsako East, Edo State, Nigeria
- Died: August 15, 2002 (aged 63) Germany
- Spouse: Mrs Theodora innih

Military service
- Allegiance: Nigeria
- Branch/service: Nigerian Army
- Years of service: 1962–1980
- Rank: Major General
- Commands: Brigade Commander, 5 Infantry Brigade, Onitsha. Quarter Master General of the Nigerian Army. General Officer Commanding, 1Infantry Division

George Agbazika Innih (September 25, 1938 – August 14, 2002) was a Nigerian Army general and statesman. He was the military governor of Bendel and Kwara States.

== Early years ==
George Agbazika Innih was born on September 25, 1938, at Agenebode, Etsako East Local Government Area (LGA) of Edo State. He was educated at Catholic school, Akure, the Government school in Warri, the Holy Cross Catholic school in Benin City and Edo College, Benin City.

== Military career ==
He joined the army, and was trained at Mons Officer Cadet School in Aldershot, England (1962), then at the Royal Military Academy Sandhurst, England (1962–1964) and 1972. He was appointed platoon commander, 4th Infantry Battalion, Ibadan (1964–65), deputy military secretary, Supreme Headquarters, Lagos, Colonel General Staff 3rd Marine Commando (1968–69) and brigade commander, 5 Infantry Brigade, Onitsha 1974–74.

After the coup of July 29, 1975, by Brigadier Murtala Mohammed, he was made military governor of Bendel State, since split into Edo State and Delta State. Soon after taking control, he dissolved the executive council and the boards of statutory corporations, suspended all contract awards, and set up committees to review finances and projects undertaken by his predecessor Samuel Ogbemudia. Several serving officers were retired from service.

On February 13, 1976, General Murtala Mohammed was killed in a failed coup and his second-in-command, his chief of staff Lt-Gen. Olusegun Obasanjo, was appointed as head of state. In March, Obasanjo redeployed Colonel Innih to Kwara state, replacing him with Navy captain Hussaini Abdullahi. Innih served in Kwara State as military governor until 1978.

He was Quarter Master General of the Nigerian Army (1978–79) and general officer commanding, I Infantry Division, Nigerian Army (1979–80), when he retired.

== Tenure ==
Colonel George A. Innih served in the Nigerian Civil War from 1967 to 1970. He was a battalion commander in the 3rd Infantry Division. After the war, he held a number of command and staff positions in the Nigerian Army. In 1976, Innih was appointed military governor of Kwara State. He was a popular governor who was known for his development projects. He launched the Operation Feed the Nation (OFN) program, which was a national agricultural program aimed at increasing food production. He also constructed the Kwara State Stadium Complex, the Adewole Housing Estate, and the Unity and Taiwo Roads. He also built new markets in all local government areas of the state, including the Baboko market in Ilorin. Innih retired from the Nigerian Army in 1980. He died in 2002 at the age of 63.

== Subsequent career ==
Innih became the president of Retired Officers of Nigerian Armed Forces Organization (RANAO). He was chairman/managing director of Niger Valley Agro Industries Limited, chairman / managing director of Tamsaks Nigeria Limited and chairman of Bridgestone Finance Limited. He was honored with the Order of the Federal Republic (OFR). The University of Ilorin awarded him an Honorary Doctor of Law in 1998. He died in 2002.
