= Adeoyo Hospital =

Hospital in Ibadan, Oyo, Nigeria

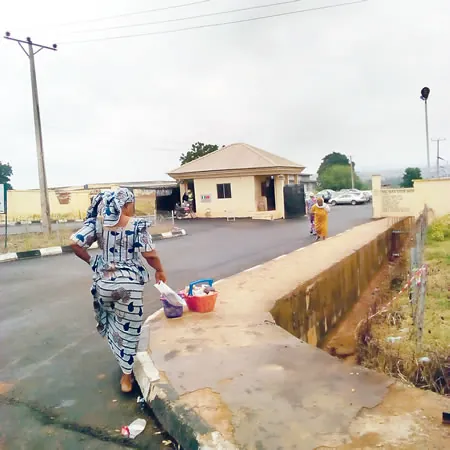

Geography
- Location: Ibadan, Nigeria
- Coordinates: 7.3512°N 3.8625°E

Organisation
- Type: General Hospital
- Affiliated university: University College Hospital, Ibadan

Services
- Emergency department: 24 hours

Helipads
- Helipad: No

History
- Founded: 1928

Adeoyo Hospital, formerly known as Adeoyo Maternity Hospital (established in 1928) is a large general hospital in the city of Ibadan, Oyo State, Nigeria.

== History ==
The hospital was established in 1928. It was formerly used as a college hospital by the University of Ibadan between 1948 and 1954 after being upgraded with an additional fifty beds, laboratory, X-ray annex, medical lecture rooms, and mortuary.

The hospital provides maternal and child healthcare services to people in Ibadan and the surrounding area. It is made up of an antenatal clinic, labor ward, antenatal ward, gynecological ward, lying in ward, children's ward, immunization clinic, post-caesarian section ward, gynecological clinic and family planning clinic.

Emergency children's ward was donated by Karim Adeyemi foundation

== Department/services ==
- Accident and Emergency
- General Surgery,
- Antenatal Care
- Cardiothoracic Surgery
- Pediatric Surgery
- Gastroenterology
- Obstetrics & Gynecology Services
- Fertility/Assisted Reproductive Techniques

== Commission ==
On the 26 of May 2026 the Olubadan of Ibadan Adewolu Ladoja commissioned the Karim Adeyemi Foundation (KAF) Children’s Emergency Ward in the hospital.

=== Inauguration ===
Oyo State governor Seyi Makinde in 2022 inaugurated the renal and dialysis unit in the hospital.

=== Renovation ===
In 2016, the maternity unit was renovated under a public–private partnership.
