= Husaini Abdullahi =

Vice Admiral Husaini Abdullahi
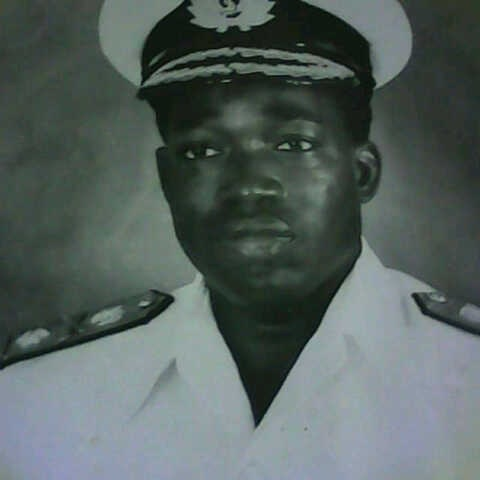
- Vice Admiral Husaini Abdullahi (rtd.)

Governor of Bendel State
- In office March 1976 – July 1978
- Preceded by: George Agbazika Innih
- Succeeded by: Abubakar Waziri

Personal details
- Born: 2 March 1939
- Died: 9 July 2019 (aged 80)
- Spouse(s): Hadizah Husaini Abdullahi, Maimunah Husaini Abdullahi

Military service
- Allegiance: Nigeria
- Branch/service: Nigerian Navy
- Years of service: 1965- 2001
- Rank: Vice Admiral

Husaini Abdullahi (3 March 1939 – 9 July 2019) was the military governor of Bendel State, Nigeria from March 1976 to July 1978 during the military regime of General Olusegun Obasanjo.

Husaini Abdullahi was born on 3 March 1939 in Doma Local Government now in Nasarawa State of Nigeria. As a lieutenant commander, Abdullahi was in charge of troop landings from NNS Lokoja during the capture of Bonny Island in July 1967, during the Nigerian Civil War. On 30 July 1975, the new Head of State Brigadier Murtala Muhammed announced that Captain Abdullahi had been appointed to the Supreme Military Council. General Olusegun Obasanjo appointed Commodore Abdullahi Military Governor of Bendel State from March 1976 to July 1978.

After retiring from the navy as a vice-admiral, Abdullahi became chairman of the board of directors of the Inland Bank Nigeria.
