= Nigerian Military School =

Military high school in Zaria, Nigeria

- Other names: NMS
- Type: military academy
- Established: 1954
- Affiliations: Armed Forces of Nigeria
- Location: Zaria, Kaduna State, Nigeria
- Website: https://www.nms1954.sch.ng/

The Nigerian Military School, Zaria, popularly known as NMS, is a military boarding school in the Federal Republic of Nigeria, affiliated with the Armed Forces of Nigeria.

== History ==
=== Boys Company ===
It was founded as the Boys Company of Nigeria in 1954, was established under the auspices of Nigerian Regiment Training centre of the Royal West African Frontier Force (RWAFF). The school was established along with three others in the British Colonial West Africa in Gambia, Gold Coast (now Ghana), and Sierra Leone. It was modeled after the Boys Wing of the British Army. The present day Military School came into being on May 20, 1954. The Nigerian Military School (NMS) had a student battalion that consisted of 4 company in its early years:

- Alpha Company
- Bravo Company
- Charlie Company
- Delta Company

Three additional companies were added:

- Echo Company
- Foxtrot Company
- Golf Company.

The Boys Company as it used to be called was established as a full-fledged training institution under the regimentation and administration of the defunct Nigerian Regimental Training Centre (NRTC) now Depot NA. The first Commandant of the School, was Captain Wellington Duke Bassey.

The aim of the school was the production of "middle and skilled manpower" to replace the departing British Colonial NCOs. Thus, a lot of emphasis was laid on military and academic training. In 1958, ten Boys from the School sat for the overseas Armed Forces General Certificate Examination and the school changed to school certificate status.

=== NMS ===
In 1960, the name "Boys Company" was changed to Nigerian Military School. In 1965 the first set of Boys took the West African Examination Council (WAEC) examination in which they performed creditably well. With the introduction of the new National Policy on Education, the School now runs six-year training programme broken into junior and senior classes of three years duration respectively. A Board of Governors was established to oversee the running of the school.

== Structure ==
The school is segmented into 5 main Wings:

- Headquarters
- Military Wing
- Education Wing
- Boys Battalion
- Administrative Company.

== Education ==
The Nigerian Military School gives its boy soldiers both academic and military training. Every boy soldier as the students are called has one day a week dedicated strictly to military training while the other four days of the week are dedicated to academic training. Similar to civil secondary schools, the students sit for the West African Senior School Certificate Exam prior to graduation. The boys join the Nigerian Army as private soldiers on passing out from the Nigerian Military school.

The initial group of boy soldiers were known as the "First Platoon" who were sons and wards of serving military personnel. However its military history can be traced to 1951 when the idea of establishing "Boys Company" along the same pattern of the Boys Wing of British Army was conceived for each of the West African Colonies Namely: the Gambia, Gold coast(Ghana), Nigeria and Sierra Leone. The Nigerian military school prides itself due to its numerous successes in regional and national quizzes, drama and sporting competition. It is also said to have one of the highest educational and academic standards in the country, more than most conventional civil high schools in Nigeria. It further prides itself in producing very notable persons within and outside Nigeria.

== Notable alumni ==
NMS has produced numerous Senior Military officers and Senior Staff in both Government and Private sectors. till date it has produced a military vice president, four chiefs of defence staff and a president of the united nations general assembly. Some of its alumni include

- Tunde Idiagbon
- Joseph Garba
- John Shagaya
- Jeremiah Useni
- John Inienger
- Salihu Ibrahim
- Buba Marwa
- John Dungs
- Yakubu Mu'azu
- Alexander Ogomudia
- Abubakar Sani Bello
- Abdulkareem Adisa
- Senator David Mark
- George Alily
- Raji Rasaki
- Abdussamad Dasuki
- Zamani Lekwot
- Abayomi Olonisakin
- Ola Ibrahim
- Emmanuel Ogalla
- Hassan Abubakar

== Companies ==
In line with the structure of a battalion as the Military School changed from being Boy’s Company to a battalion status and to encourage sporting activities and competition as attendance increased, four companies were created: Exham, Inglis, FairBanks and Swynnerton. These names were later changed to Giffard, Tranchard, Whistler and Lugard.

As the School changed to School certificate status shortly after independence, the companies names were also changed to Lagos, Ibadan, Enugu and Kaduna. The new names were chosen to reflect the regional capitals of the country.

In 1976, two additional companies were added and the names were again changed. The new companies names reflected military company designations: Alpha, Bravo, Charlie, Delta, Echo, Foxtrot.

One additional has been added: Golf, the 7th company. In late 2003, the School changed to the old names of Kaduna, Lagos, Ibadan and Enugu, with Abuja, Calabar and Zaria companies given to the additional new companies of Echo, Foxtrot and Gulf.

== Commandants ==
Since its inception, the Military Institution has at various times been commanded by numerous Officers. They are as follows:

Commandant	Took office	Left office
Capt WU Bassy	20 May 1954	31 Dec 1956
Maj CJ Grindley	01 Jan 1956	31 Dec 1959
Maj RK Gardiner	01 Jan 1960	31 July 1961
Maj JM McCarter	01 Aug 1961	28 Feb 1962
Maj PJ Wakeman	01 Mar 1962	09 Nov 1964
Maj - Col TB Ogundeko	10 Nov 1964	09 Nov 1972
Lt Col- Col TO Oduniyi	10 Nov 1972	02 Aug 1977
Col - Brig Gen CB Ndiomu	03 Nov 1977	02 Aug 1982
Col O Daramola FSS AMNIN	03 Aug 1982	23 Sep 1985
Col IA Fakulujo FSS psc	24 Sep 1985	13 Oct 1990
Col - Brig Gen FA Ogunribido FSS MSS	14 Oct 1990	31 July 1993
Col EBA Okodaso FSS MSS psc	01 Aug 1993	30 Jan 1995
Brig Gen HB Momoh FSS MSS psc mni	26 Jan 1995	30 Jan 1997
Brig Gen SA Sofoluwe FSS MSS psc mni	31 Jan 1997	31 Mar 1999
Brig Gen SK Oni FSS MSS PhD	01 Apr 1999	26 Apr 2000
Col D Bitrus MSS psc	27 Apr 2000	12 Aug 2003
Col IG Bauka FSS psc LLB BL	13 Aug 2003	05 Sep 2005
Col CO Esekhaigbe MSS psc B.Sc(Hons) MILD PGD MIMC	05 Sep 2005	01 Sep 2006
Col GJ Udi Fss Mss psc	01 Sep 2006	31 Dec 2007
Brig Gen FS Amuche MSS psc MSc	31 Dec 2007	05 Aug 2009
Col LF Abdullahi Fss Mss Psc PhD	05 Aug 2009	30 Aug 2013
Col - Brig Gen JA Fayehun Fss Mss PGDE	30 Aug 2013	31 Dec 2015
Brig Gen - Maj Gen MM Bunza DSS TSM FCAI YAP NEGL CLN PhD	31 Dec 2015	06 Jan 2020
Brig Gen - Maj Gen BH Mohammed FSS MSS DSS TSM CMH MTRCN	06 Jan 2020	21 Jan 2021
Brig Gen UJ Makbere FSS MSS DSS MTRCN	21 Jan 2021	30 Apr 2021
Brig Gen JT Aun DSS FNARC MTRCN CCMN MSMPS MA	30 Apr 2021	20 Jan 2023
Brig Gen AD Aliyu DSS fdc MTRCN MA	20 Jan 2023	24 Jan 2025
Brig Gen ON Ejiga FSS MSS psc(+) fwc fdc	24 Jan 2025	To Date
