= 2003 Imo State gubernatorial election =

2003 gubernatorial election in Imo State, Nigeria

- April 19, 2003
Nominee	Achike Udenwa	Ezekiel Izogu
Party	PDP	APGA
Running mate	Ebere Udeagu	J. A. Iroegbu
Popular vote	695,405	142,942
Governor before election
Achike Udenwa
PDP
Elected Governor
Achike Udenwa
PDP

The 2003 Imo State gubernatorial election occurred in Nigeria on April 19, 2003. The PDP nominee Achike Udenwa won the election, defeating Ezekiel Izogu of the APGA.

Achike Udenwa emerged PDP candidate. He picked Ebere Udeagu as his running mate. Ezekiel Izogu was the APGA candidate with J. A. Iroegbu as his running mate.

== Electoral system ==
The Governor of Imo State is elected using the plurality voting system.

== Primary election ==
=== PDP primary ===
The PDP primary election was won by Achike Udenwa. He picked Ebere Udeagu as his running mate.

=== APGA primary ===
The APGA primary election was won by Ezekiel Izogu. He picked J. A. Iroegbu as his running mate.

== Results ==
A total number of 11 candidates registered with the Independent National Electoral Commission to contest in the election.

The total number of registered voters in the state was 1,630,494.

Candidate	Party	Votes	%
Achike Udenwa	People's Democratic Party	695,405	82.95
Ezekiel Izogu	All Progressives Grand Alliance	142,942	17.05
Total		838,347	100.00
Registered voters/turnout		1,630,494	–
Source: CCSU
