= Jeremiah Useni =

Nigerian politician (1943–2025)

Lieutenant general Jeremiah Useni

Senator of the Federal Republic of Nigeria
- In office May 2015 – June 2019
- Preceded by: Victor Lar
- Succeeded by: Ignatius Datong Longjan
- Constituency: Plateau South Senatorial District

Minister of the Federal Capital Territory
- In office 1993–1998
- Preceded by: Gado Nasko
- Succeeded by: Mamman Kontagora

Governor of Bendel State
- In office January 1984 – August 1985
- Preceded by: Samuel Ogbemudia
- Succeeded by: John Mark Inienger

Personal details
- Born: Jeremiah Timbut Useni; 16 February 1943 Langtang, Northern Region, Colony and Protectorate of Nigeria (now in Plateau State, Nigeria)
- Died: 23 January 2025 (aged 81)
- Party: Peoples Democratic Party

Military service
- Allegiance: Nigeria
- Branch/service: Nigerian Army
- Rank: Lieutenant general

Jeremiah Timbut Useni (16 February 1943 – 23 January 2025) was a Nigerian army lieutenant general, who served as minister responsible for the administration of the Federal Capital Territory, Abuja under the Sani Abacha military junta. He served Nigeria in various capacities such as Minister for Transport and Quarter-Master General of the Nigeria Army. Useni also served as Deputy Chairman of one of the significant parties in Nigeria, the All Nigeria Peoples Party. He was elected Senator for the Plateau South constituency of Plateau State, Nigeria in the March 2015 national elections. Useni was running on the People's Democratic Party (PDP) platform.

== Background ==
Jeremiah Useni was born in Langtang, Northern Region, British Nigeria on 16 February 1943. He died on 23 January 2025, at the age of 81. He was close friends with Sani Abacha and Garba Duba since the mid 1960s.

== Military service ==
Useni came to national limelight in Nigeria when he was appointed Military Governor of Nigeria's defunct Bendel State in January 1984. In 1998, Useni then minister for the capital territory of Abuja, was rumored as a successor to General Sani Abacha. Useni stated that the decision to appoint Abdulsalami Abubakar instead was based on protocol. Ten years later, Useni insisted Abacha died a natural death, contrary to rumors that he died after eating a poisoned apple.

Speaking in April 2008, the Minister of the Federal Capital Territory, Aliyu Modibbo Umar, blamed problems with the Abuja Master Plan on the administration of Useni as a minister under the Abacha military government.

== Political career ==
In August 2001, he was appointed head of a delegation from the Arewa Consultative Forum to meet and discuss common goals with Northern state governors and other leaders. In 2003, he was Deputy National Chairman, North for the All Nigeria Peoples Party (ANPP). In November 2004, he was locked in an internal ANPP struggle with Chief Donald Etiebet, the National Chairman.

In May 2006, he left the ANPP to become chairman of a new party, the Democratic People's Party, taking with him other members of the progressive wing of the ANPP. However, he was suspended indefinitely in December 2008, for saying the death of Ken Saro-Wiwa was a national sacrifice. He was succeeded by Biodun Ogunbiyi, who criticized Useni's poor leadership, resulting in failure to win any seats in the Senate or House of Representatives in the April 2007 elections. Useni ran for election as Senator for Plateau South in April 2011 on the DPP platform, but was defeated by Victor Lar of the PDP. He later on ran for election as Senator for Plateau South In 2015 under the People's Democratic Party which he won.

=== Governorship run ===
In October 2018, Jeremiah Useni won the party primaries in the PDP to run for Office Of The Governor Of Plateau state under the platform of the People's Democratic Party. He lost in the general election to incumbent Simon Lalong who polled 595,582 votes to Useni's 546,813. Useni challenged the election of Simon Lalong at the plateau State Governorship Election Petition Tribunal on the grounds that Lalong was ineligible to assume the position of Governor, having submitted a different certificate to the electoral umpire (INEC) bearing different name to that of the present Governor of Plateau State, Simon Bako Lalong.

The panel of three justices Tribunal led by Justice Halima Salami struck out Useni's petition affirming the election of Lalong for lack of substantial evidence to prove the discrepancy of names in the certificate Lalong submitted to INEC. Useni appealed the judgement of the tribunal at both Appeal Court and the Supreme Court but lost. The disappointing judgment from the courts ended his 2019 ambition to rule Plateau State.
