= Pius Odubu =

Nigerian politician and lawyer

Pius Egberanmwen Odubu (born 1 July 1957) is a Nigerian politician and lawyer who served as a member of the House of Representatives (1999–2007), the deputy governor of Edo state (2012–2016) and the chairman of the Niger Delta Development Commission.

== Biography ==
Pius Odubu was born on 1 July 1957 in Urhomehe, Orhionmwon, Edo State. Obudu holds a bachelor's degree in political science, a J.D. in law and LL.M in international and comparative law. Obudu was a member of the board of editors of Southern University Law Review and later served as its managing editor. In 1986, Odubu was called to the bar.

Odubu was elected as a member of the House of Representatives from 1999 to 2007. From 2012 to 2016, he served as the deputy governor of Edo state under Adams Oshiomhole. Odubu was appointed by the chairman of Niger Delta Development Commission board in 2019 and was removed in December 2019.
