= Daisy Danjuma =

Nigerian politician

Daisy Ehanire Danjuma

Senator of the Federal Republic of Nigeria from Edo South Senatorial District
- In office 2003–2007
- Constituency: Edo South Senatorial District

Personal details
- Born: Daisy Ukpomwan Ehanire; August 6, 1952 (age 74) Benin City
- Party: Peoples Democratic Party
- Spouse: Theophilus Danjuma
- Occupation: Politician, Business woman

Daisy Ehanire Danjuma (born 6 August 1952) is a Nigerian politician who was the senator representing the Edo South Senatorial District of Edo State at the Nigerian Senate from 2003 to 2007. She also re-contested during the Nigeria general election in 2011 but was unsuccessful.

== Biography ==
Daisy Ehanire Danjuma was born on 6 August 1952 in Benin City, Edo State, Nigeria. She was the fourth of eight children in her family. She grew up with her aunt who married a police officer in Benin City.

Danjuma attended government secondary school in Benin city, Edo state, before studying at Ahmadu Bello University, Zaria, where she graduated with a BA in Law in 1976. In 1977, she was called to the Nigerian Bar as a practising lawyer. Danjuma undertook her national service in the NYSC as a State Counsel with the Ministry of Justice of Lagos State, and was a legal counsel to the Legal Aid Council of Nigeria. She worked as an Executive Assistant at Nigerian Acceptances Limited (NAL), a Merchant Bank, from 1977 to 1978. She was Company Secretary/Legal Adviser to the Nigerian Television Authority (NTA) from 1982 to 1992.

Danjuma is a member of the International Bar Association, the Nigerian Bar Association, and the International Federation of Female Lawyers. She has been awarded honorary doctorate degrees from several Nigerian universities, including the University of Ibadan, the University of Benin, and Redeemer's University.

== Politics ==
Danjuma's political career began when her husband got relocated to Port Harcourt and became a minister of Abuja. After meeting their neighbor, Chief Bola Ige, she decided to represent Edo South in the Senate.

In the 2003 Nigerian parliamentary election, Danjuma was elected senator to represent Edo South constituency of Edo State at the Nigerian National Assembly from 2003 to 2007 under the Action Congress Party. As a senator she served as the Chairman, Senate Committee on Women Affairs and Youth Development, Member, Senate Committees on Health, Education, Finance and Land Transport of the National Assembly. Being a senator from Nigeria gave Danjuma the opportunity to be a member of the Commonwealth Parliamentary Association. Danjuma has contributed to women's empowerment through her legislative and philanthropic work. She has also served as Chairman, Women and Child Right Committee of the Economic Community of West African States (ECOWAS Parliament). Danjuma contested for a second tenure for her senate office during the 2011 Nigeria general election but was unsuccessful and defeated by Ehigie Edobor Uzamere with final result of 135,346 votes to 70,725. After a series of appeals, in June 2009, the court of appeal ruled that Uzamere had in fact been duly elected.

== Personal life ==
Danjuma is married to the former Nigerian military general and minister of defence of Nigeria, Theophilus Danjuma, founder of South Atlantic Petroleum. They have one child.
