= Lucky Imasuen =

Former deputy governor of Edo State

Deputy Governor of Edo State
- In office 29 May 2007 – 11 November 2008
- Governor: Oserheimen Osunbor
- Preceded by: Mike Oghiadomhe
- Succeeded by: Pius Odubu

Personal details
- Party: People's Democratic Party (former)
- Occupation: Politician

Lucky Imasuen is a Nigerian politician who served as the deputy governor of Edo State from 2007 to 2008 under the governorship of Oserheimen Osunbor. Prior to this, Imasuen ran unsuccessfully for the office of the governor of Edo State in 1999 and withdrew his candidacy in the 2024 governorship elections in Edo State.

== Early life and education ==
Imasuen is a Nigerian politician from Edo State, Nigeria.

== Political career ==
Imasuen began his political career in Edo State. Before becoming Deputy Governor, he served as Chief of Staff to Governor Lucky Igbinedion. In 2007, he was elected Deputy Governor of Edo State alongside Governor Oserheimen Osunbor under the People's Democratic Party (PDP). He served as Deputy Governor of Edo State from 29 May 2007 to 11 November 2008. His tenure ended after the court nullified the election that brought the administration into office. In 2024, he announced his interest in contesting the Edo State governorship election but later withdrew before the party primary election.
