= Abubakar Waziri =

Nigerian politician and major general

Major General Abubakar Waziri

Governor, Bendel State, Nigeria
- In office 24 July 1978 – 30 September 1979
- Preceded by: Husaini Abdullahi
- Succeeded by: Ambrose Folorunsho Alli

Governor, Borno State, Nigeria
- In office January 1984 – August 1985
- Preceded by: Asheik Jarma
- Succeeded by: Abdulmumini Aminu

Personal details
- Born: 28 September 1940

Military service
- Allegiance: Nigeria
- Branch/service: Nigerian Army
- Rank: Major General

Abubakar Waziri (28 September 1940) was the Military Governor of Bendel State in Nigeria from July 1978 to September 1979 during the transitional period of military to civilian government under General Olusegun Obasanjo. Later he was military governor of Borno State from January 1984 to August 1985 during the regime of General Muhammadu Buhari.

Waziri was born in the Fika Emirate in Yobe State. Waziri was one of the referees of "Exercise SunStroke", a ten-day field exercise conducted early in 1975 that turned out to be a dress rehearsal for the Military Rebellion of 29 July 1975, when General Yakubu Gowon was removed from power and replaced by Murtala Muhammed. While governor of Bendel State, Waziri was also Brigade Commander, 4 Mechanised Brigade, Nigeria Army Benin City.

Medical services in Borno State were minimal at the time he held office (January 1984 to August 1985), with only one doctor for every 65,000 people. The state had a severe drought in this period, losing over 660,000 tons of crops. Waziri initiated a direct feeding program in the Borno secondary schools to ensure students were not exploited by private contractors.

Waziri retired as a major general. After the return to democracy in 1999, Waziri played an active role in politics.
