= Mohammed Abul-Salam Onuka =

Former military administrator of Edo State

Military Administrator of Edo State
- In office 9 December 1993 – 14 September 1994
- Preceded by: John Odigie Oyegun
- Succeeded by: Colonel Bassey Asuquo

Mohammed Abul-Salam Onuka was a Nigerian soldier who served as Military Administrator of Edo State between December 1993 and September 1994. He took over from the civilian governor, John Odigie Oyegun, at the start of the military administration of General Sani Abacha.

Colonel Onuka made an attempt to develop the tourism potential of the scenic area of Ososo, but the effort was short-lived because of the sudden termination of the Abacha administration. From Okene in Kogi State and first cousin to the present Governor of Kogi State Yahaya Bello (APC).
