= Victor Oyofo =

Nigerian politician

Victor Kassim Isa Oyofo
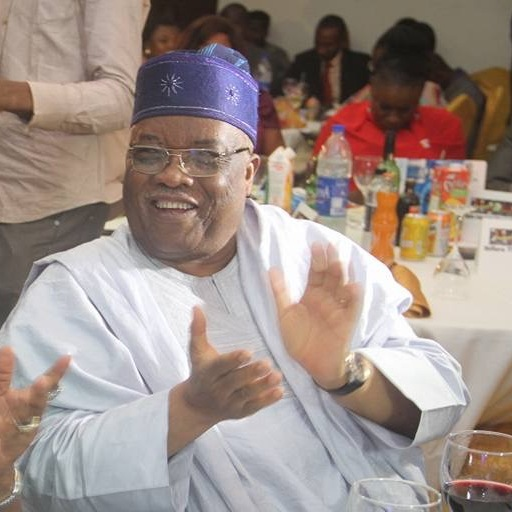
- Oyofo in 2015

Senator of the Federal Republic of Nigeria from Edo North Senatorial District
- In office 29 May 1999 – 29 May 2007
- Succeeded by: Yisa Braimoh

Personal details
- Born: Edo State, Nigeria
- Party: People's Democratic Party

Victor Kassim Isa Oyofo is a Nigerian politician who was elected Senator for the Edo North Senatorial District of Edo State at the start of the Nigerian Fourth Republic, running on the People's Democratic Party (PDP) platform. He took office on 29 May 1999.

After taking his seat in the Senate he was appointed to committees on Petroleum, Solid Minerals, Environment (vice chairman), Police Affairs, Commerce and Niger Delta.

== Personal ==
He is married to Oyinkansola Oyofo, who was born in 1959. They married in 1981.
