= Orhionmwon =

Orhionmwon Orhionmwon Igue
- LGA
- Nickname: Igue edo
- Interactive map of Orhionmwon
- Country: Nigeria
- State: Edo State
- Capital: Abudu

Area
  - Total: 2,382 km^{2} (920 sq mi)

Population (2006)
  - Total: 206,717
  - Density: 86.78/km^{2} (224.8/sq mi)
- Time zone: UTC+1 (WAT)

Orhionmwon is a Local Government Area of Edo State, Nigeria. Its headquarter is in the town of Abudu. It has an area of 2,382 km^{2} and a population of 206,717 at the 2006 census. The postal code of the area is 301.

Orhionmwon local government area of Edo State is considered one of the biggest local government area among those in Edo South Senatorial District. Its administrative headquarters is at Abudu.

== Towns and villages in Orhionmwon ==
Aibiokunla, Abudu town, Ogan, Evbuobanosa, Iduondolor, Urherue, Umoghun Nokhua, Ologbo Nugu, Orogho, Owuo, Obagie Nunuamen, Iwevbo, Obanakhuoro, Iguelaba, Oben, Ikobi, Obozogbe Nugu, Ugbigun/Ukpakele, Evboesi town, Umokhunzuagbor, Evbonogbon, Obazagbon, Ogba, Camp 34, Enogie camp, Ugboko-Niro, Ugboko-Numagbae, Ugo, Niyekorhionmwon, Ugbugo, Idumwenbo, Iduenke, Iguododo, Obozogbe-Niro, Ugbighele, Ikpeba-Camp, Oteleku-Camp, Igbanke, Urhonigbe, Iyoba, Evbokabua, Otobaye, Evbobemwen, Evbodobia, Owe, Egbokor, Evbohghighae Evb'ivbiohon, Ugbokhirima, Urhomehe

Other towns and communities such as Idumodin, Ottah, Okuor, Edummungba, Egbhuru, Egbokor, Ute - Oheze, Ugo, Urhonigbe, Igbanke, Iru egbede, Evbobanosa, Oza, Ogan, Uson, Oloten, Obagie N’Oheze, Iguododo, Ugbedun, Akugbe, Idumiru, Idumwebo, Numagbae, Ugokoniro, Ukpato, Avbiugo, Okogbo, Evbuehia, Iguere, Igbekhue, iguehanza, Obozogbe-niro, Evbomede, Evb'ivbiohon and Obi, among others. The local government came about in the aftermath of the creation of the defunct Bendel State. The local government area has rubber plantations, agricultural produces, crude oil as well as mineral resources. The local government is dominated by Benin-speaking communities such as Ugo and Okogbo and surrounded by neighboring Delta State (Agbor and Eku).

== Education ==
The Orhionmwon local government area is home to Lighthouse University and Edo State College of Education, Abudu Campus.

== Geography and climate ==
Orhionmwon LGA has an average temperature of 28 degrees Celsius or 82.4 degrees Fahrenheit and a total area of 2,382 square kilometres or 920 square miles. The Orhionmwon River flows through the LGA, which also has large forest reserves. In Orhionmwon LGA, the average wind speed is reported to be 11 km/h or 6.8 mph. With a typical yearly temperature of roughly 27 °C (81 °F), temperatures remain constantly high throughout the year. The rainy season's average temperature is 25 °C or 77 °F, while the dry season's is 28 °C (82.4 °F).

== Economy ==
Orhionmwon LGA has a thriving agricultural industry and is well-known for growing a variety of crops, including maize, plantains, yams, and cassava. Additionally, the LGA boasts a thriving commerce industry, with multiple marketplaces that draw thousands of buyers and sellers of various goods. Animal husbandry, food processing, and lumbering are some of the other significant economic activities carried out by the residents of Orhionmwon LGA.
