= Ambrose Folorunsho Alli =

Nigerian academic and politician

Governor, Bendel State, Nigeria
- In office October 1979 – October 1983
- Preceded by: Abubakar Waziri
- Succeeded by: Samuel Ogbemudia

Personal details
- Born: 22 September 1929 Idoani, Ondo state, Nigeria
- Died: 22 September 1989 (aged 60) Lagos University Teaching Hospital.
- Party: Unity Party of Nigeria (UPN)
- Education: School of Agriculture Ibadan, School of Medical Technology, Adeoyo Hospital Ibadan, University of London, University of Birmingham.
- Occupation: Lecturer Politician

Ambrose Folorunsho Alli (22 September 1929 – 22 September 1989) was a Nigerian medical professor who served as Executive Governor of the defunct Nigerian state of Bendel State (now the Nigerian states of Edo and Delta) between 1979 and 1983. He was the first civilian governor.

== Background ==
Ambrose Folorunsho Alli was born in Idoani, Ondo state on 22 September 1929. In his childhood he moved between Oka-Odo, Ekpoma, Owo, Efon-Alaye, Benin City and Asaba, where he completed his secondary education in 1948. He attended the School of Agriculture Ibadan (1948) and the School of Medical Technology, Adeoyo Hospital Ibadan (1953–1960) where he gained an MBBS. He served as a house officer at the Adeoyo hospital from 1960 to 1961. He went to the United Kingdom for a post-graduate course in neuropathology at the University of London (1961–1966), gaining a D.C. pathology degree. Later he studied at the University of Birmingham from 1971 to 1974.

He was a lecturer at the University of Ibadan (1966–1969) and a senior lecturer at the Ahmadu Bello University, Zaria (1969–1974). From 1974 to 1979, Alli was a professor of morbid anatomy and head of the department of pathology at the University of Benin, Benin City.

== Political career ==
Alli founded Bendel State University in Ekpoma. Many campuses in Ekpoma, Abraka and Asaba were established during his tenure. However, with the creation of Delta State by the administration of General Ibrahim Babangida, the university was split into two universities: Delta State University, Abraka and Ambrose Alli University, Ekpoma, which was posthumously named after him.

Alli was a member of the constituent assembly that drafted the 1978 Nigerian constitution. He joined the Unity Party of Nigeria (UPN) and ran successfully as UPN candidate in the Bendel State gubernatorial election of 1979. He was the first governor of Bendel State, alongside deputy governor Demas Akpore.

Alli brought massive development to Bendel in different sectors, from the establishment of numerous post-primary schools and tertiary institutions, and massive construction of roads and housing. His main goal as governor was to increase educational opportunities. He established over 600 new secondary schools and abolished secondary school fees. Apart from the establishment of the university, he also established various colleges of education in Ekiadolor near Benin City, Agbor, Warri, Ozoro and Agbor, and three Polytechnics, with a college of agriculture and fishery proposed for Agenebode. He also established four teachers training colleges to supply staff to the new schools, as well as several other higher educational institutions. Other reforms included abolishing charges for services and drugs at state-owned hospitals and eliminating the flat-rate tax. His administration carried out massive construction of roads to open up the rural areas. In the housing sector, he built low cost housing estates in Ugbowo, Ikpoba Hill in Benin City, and Bendel Estates in Warri.

As governor, he always wore sandals, joking that he was so busy working in Government House that he never had time to buy shoes for himself.

== Later career ==
When Alli left office in 1983, he retired to his family house. After the military government of Major-General Muhammadu Buhari took power, he was sentenced to 100 years in prison by a military tribunal for allegedly misappropriating 983,000 naira in funds for a road project. He was later freed when the Esama of Benin, Chief Gabriel Igbinedion, paid a fine to the government. He was finally released from prison after the fine amount of one million naira was paid by Chief Gabriel Igbinedion. After his release, he was hosted by Dr. Ezekiel A. Ainabe. The Local Government Council in Ekpoma honoured Alli by unveiling his statue in recognition of his sacrifice for the people of Nigeria. In order to pay respect and for the service rendered to the community, Dr. Ezekiel A. Ainabe erected a statue at the market square in Eguare, Ekpoma.

== Death ==
Shortly after being released from prison, Alli died on his 60th birthday on 22 September 1989, at the Lagos University Teaching Hospital in Lagos. An annual Distinguished Leadership Lecture was later established in his honour.
