= John Odigie Oyegun =

Nigerian politician, chairman of All Progressives Congress

National Chairman of All Progressives Congress, APC
- In office July 2013 – July 2018
- Preceded by: Bisi Akande
- Succeeded by: Adams Oshiomhole

Governor of Edo State
- In office January 1992 – 1993
- Preceded by: John Ewerekumoh Yeri
- Succeeded by: Mohammed Abul-Salam Onuka

Personal details
- Born: 12 August 1939 (age 86) Warri, Delta State, Nigeria
- Party: All Progressives Congress (APC)

John Odigie Oyegun CON (born 12 August 1939) is a Nigerian politician who served as the first national chairman of All Progressives Congress (APC) in Nigeria. He was the executive governor of Edo State between 1992 and 1993, during the aborted Third Nigerian Republic.

Oyegun led then-opposition APC and Muhammadu Buhari to victory in 2015 after defeating ruling People's Democratic Party, PDP and President's Goodluck Jonathan. It was the first time an incumbent state president and a ruling party was defeated in a presidential poll in Nigeria.

== Background ==
John Odigie Oyegun was born on 12 August 1939, in Warri, Delta State to an Edo father and Urhobo mother from Agbarha Ughelli. He attended St. Patrick's College, Asaba, and then went to the University of Ibadan where he obtained a bachelor's degree in Economics. He then served in various capacities as a federal civil servant working as a development planner.

== Political career ==
Oyegun was elected as civilian governor of Edo State on the SDP platform, during the transition to democracy launched by General Ibrahim Babangida and served from January 1992 to November 1993. He was removed from office after General Sani Abacha seized power. He became one of the leaders of the All Nigeria Peoples Party (ANPP) which was formed in 1998. In 2009, he was chairman of the Technical Working Committee of CODER.

On 13 June 2014, he was elected as the pioneer national chairman of the APC. The choice of Oyegun, from the mostly Christian south of the country, was calculated to win both Christian and Moslem votes in the challenge to President Goodluck Jonathan's Peoples Democratic Party (PDP).

In 2017, he came under intense criticism from various factions of the party including some powerful group of APC Governors for his handling of the party calling for his removal from office as national chairman of the party. President Muhammadu Buhari, the leader of the party and seven of its governors backed Odigie-Oyegun to remain in office. President Buhari later withdrew his support for Odigie-Oyegun when it became clear that most of the governors and other powerful members of the party were resolute in their efforts to remove Odigie-Oyegun from office and install a successor Adams Oshiomhole who is from the same state as Odigie-Oyegun. Odigie-Oyegun stepped down from office of the National Chairman of the party by not seeking re-election for a second term in office at the 2018 elective national convention of the party, leaving Adams Oshiomhole as the sole candidate for the position. Since leaving office, Oyegun has maintained a low public profile.
