= Oserheimen Osunbor =

Nigerian politician (born 1951)

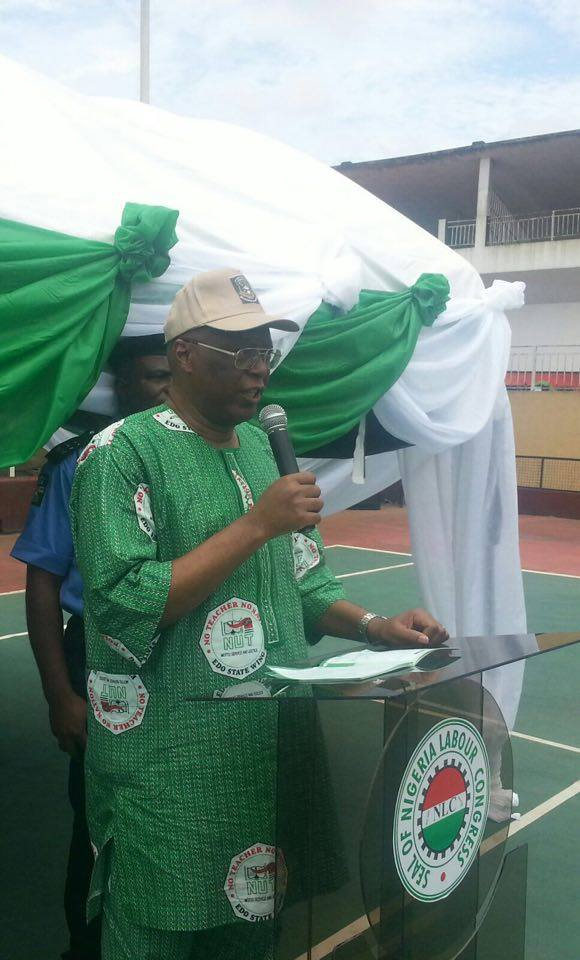
- Professor Oserheimen Osunbor, addressing Nigeria Union of Teachers (NUT), 5 October 2015, Samuel Ogbemudia Stadium, Benin City

Governor of Edo State
- In office 29 May 2007 – 11 November 2008
- Deputy: Lucky Imasuen
- Preceded by: Lucky Igbinedion
- Succeeded by: Adams Oshiomhole

Senator from Edo Central
- In office 3 June 1999 – 29 May 2007
- Succeeded by: Odion Ugbesia

Personal details
- Born: 5 October 1951 (age 74) Iruekpen, Southern Region, British Nigeria (now in Edo State, Nigeria)
- Party: All Progressives Congress (2018–2025), African Democratic Congress (2025-Present)
- Other political affiliations: Peoples Democratic Party (1998–2018),
- Education: P.T.T.C Demonstration Primary School, Igueben; Anglican Grammar School, Ujoelen; Holy Trinity Grammar School, Sabongidaa-Ora
- Alma mater: University of Nigeria, Nsukka; Nigerian Law School, Lagos; University of Warwick
- Occupation: Politician; lawyer

Oserheimen Aigberaodion Osunbor (born 5 October 1951) is a Nigerian lawyer and politician who served as the governor of Edo State from 2007 to 2008. He served as the senator representing the Edo Central senatorial district from the start of the fourth republic in 1999 to 2007.

== Early life and education ==
Osunbor was born on 5 October 1951 in Iruekpen, present-day Esan West Local Government Area of Edo State, Nigeria to Mr. Abraham A. Osunbor, a retired teacher and politician and Dame Felicia E. Osunbor, also a retired teacher. He attended P.T.T.C Demonstration Primary School, Igueben from 1957 to 1962, then Anglican Grammar School, Ujoelen Ekpoma from 1963 to 1968 and then obtained his sixth form at Holy Trinity Grammar School, Sabongidaa-Ora, Edo State. He also graduated with a First Class Honours Bachelor of Laws (LL.B) degree from the University of Nigeria, Nsukka where he studied from 1971 to 1975. During his time at the university, Osunbor was a recipient of numerous awards for his studies, including Certificate for the Best Faculty Student and the Certificate for the Best Student in the Department of Public and Private Law.

Upon completing his studies at the University of Nigeria, he relocated to Lagos where he attended Nigerian Law School until 1976. While there, he was called to the Nigerian Bar Association where in 1976 he was awarded the Certificate for the Student with the Best Overail Performance in the Nigerian Bar Examination and the Dr. Taslim Olawale Elias Prize. From 1977 to 1981, he was on Rhodes scholarship to pursue his doctorate degree in Law at the University of Warwick, Coventry, England, where he was awarded the Doctor of Philosophy (Phd) degree in Law.

== Career ==
=== Early career ===
After winning scholarship from the University of Nigeria, Nsukka Foundation, Osunbor he became an orator at the Graduands of the University of Nigeria, Nsukka. From 1976 to 1977 he was appointed as Lecturer of Law at Kaduna Polytechnic, Kaduna and then taught Company Law, Commercial Law and General Principies of Law at the same university. Starting from 1981, Osunbor served as Lecturer II, Faculty of Law at the University of Lagos, and as Lecturer I and Senior Lecturer in 1983 and from 1986 to 1990, respectively.

From 1986 to 1987, Osunbor was a Visíting Fellow at the Queen's University Belfast and from 1989 to 1990 he was a Sub-Dean, Faculty of Law at the University of Lagos. Osunbor was appointed as Professor of Law at Lagos State University in Lagos, Nigeria in 1990. He then became Professor and Head of Department of Business Law at the same alma mater, and got promoted to Dean, Faculty of Law. In 1992, Professor Osunbor became a Fellow of the Salzburg Seminar on Transnational Law and Legal institutions, Salzburg, Austria.

=== Senatorial career ===
Osunbor was elected senator for the Edo Central senatorial district of Edo State at the start of the fourth republic, running on the Peoples Democratic Party (PDP) platform. He took office on 3 June 1999.

After taking his seat in the Senate in June 1999 he was appointed to committees on Rules & Procedures, Ethics, Judiciary, Water Resources and Government Affairs (Chairman).

Osunbor was reelected to his senate seat in April 2003.

He also held Various chairmanship positions while in the Senate including: Chairman, Senate Committee on Independent National Electoral Commission (INEC); Chairman, Senate Committee on Judiciary, Human Rights and Legal Matters; Chairman, several Senate Ad-hoc Committees and National Assembly Joint Committees; Chairman, Sub-Committee on Legislature and Legislative List, National Assembly Joint Committee on Constitution Amendment. So profound was his impact that he was nicknamed "Attorney-General of the Senate" by his colleagues.

=== Governorship ===
Osunbor was elected governor of Edo State in April 2007 on the Peoples Democratic Party (PDP) platform.

On 20 March 2008, the Edo State Governorship Election Tribunal declared that Osunbor's election was invalid, and asked the Independent National Electoral Commission (INEC) to withdraw his certificate and declare Adams Oshiomhole of the Action Congress (AC) party the winner.

On 11 November 2008, a federal Appeal Court sitting in Benin City upheld the ruling of the state's elections petitions tribunal, declaring Oshiomole to be the governor of Edo State. The decision was based on several voting irregularities.

== Personal life ==
Oserheimen Osunbor is married with six children. He is the first of 7 children. He is a Christian of the Anglican denomination and a Knight of Saint Christopher.

== See also ==
- List of governors of Edo State
