= Adams Oshiomhole =

Nigerian politician (born 1952)

Adams Oshiomhole CON
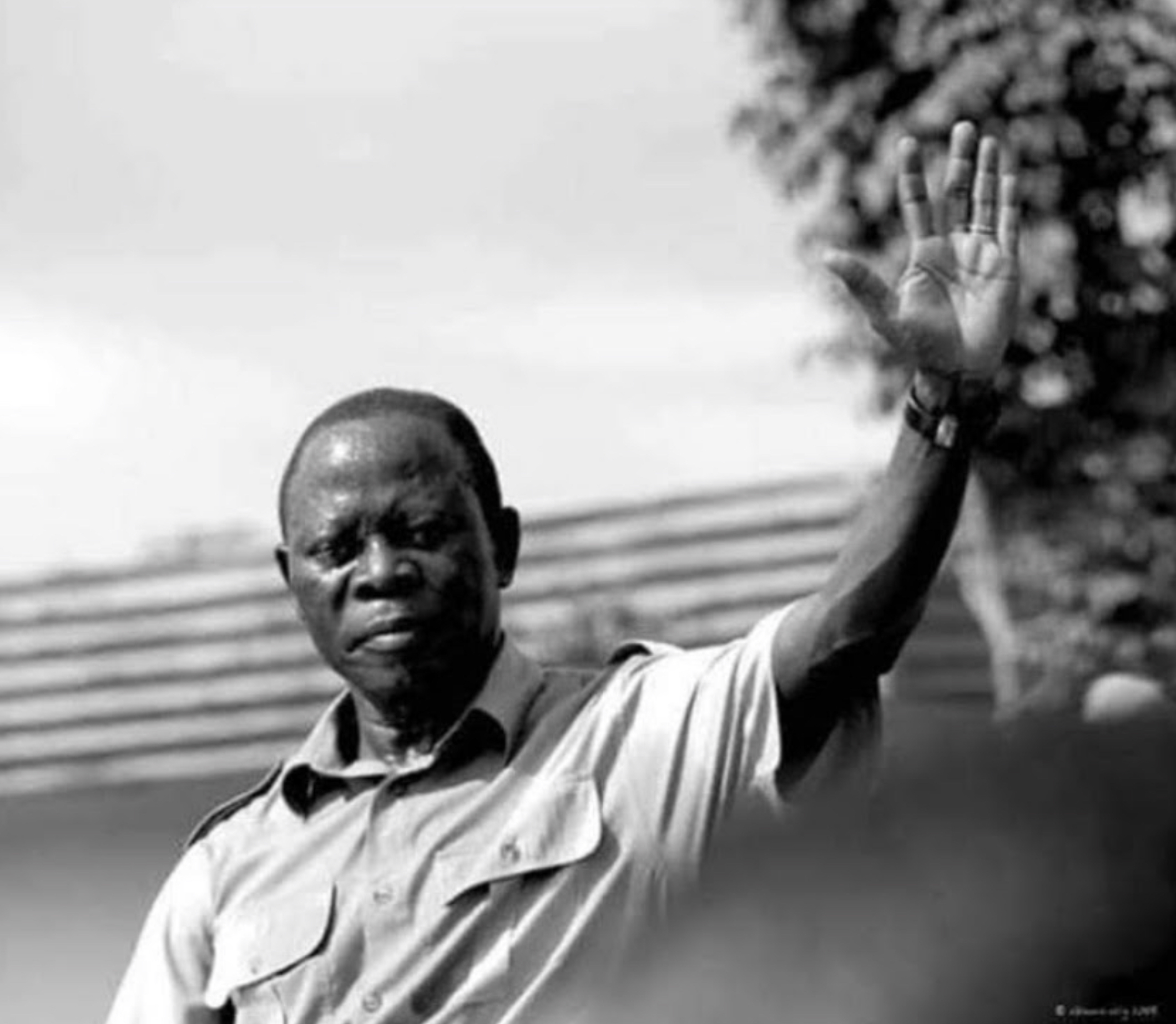

Senator for Edo North
- Incumbent
- Assumed office 13 June 2023
- Preceded by: Francis Alimikhena

National Chairman of the All Progressives Congress
- In office 20 July 2018 – 16 June 2020
- Preceded by: John Odigie Oyegun
- Succeeded by: Mai Mala Buni

Governor of Edo State
- In office 12 November 2008 – 12 November 2016
- Deputy: Pius Odubu
- Preceded by: Oserheimen Osunbor
- Succeeded by: Godwin Obaseki

President of the Nigeria Labour Congress
- In office 1999–2007
- Succeeded by: Abdulwaheed Omar

Personal details
- Born: Adams Aliyu Oshiomhole; 4 April 1952 (age 74) Iyamho, Auchi, Southern Region, British Nigeria (now in Edo State, Nigeria)
- Party: All Progressives Congress (2013–present)
- Other political affiliations: Action Congress of Nigeria (2006–2013)
- Spouses: Clara Oshiomhole (died 2010) Lara Oshiomhole (m. 2015)
- Occupation: Politician

Adams Aliyu Oshiomhole CON (born 4 April 1952) is a Nigerian politician who has served as the senator representing the Edo North senatorial district since 2023. He is a former national chairman of the All Progressive Congress. He previously served as the president of the Nigeria Labour Congress from 1999 to 2007 and as governor of Edo State from 2008 to 2016.

As APC national chairman, he was suspended from office by the Abuja Court of Appeal on 16 June 2020.

== Background ==
Oshiomhole was born on 4 April 1952 at Iyamho, near Auchi in Edo State. He was born Muslim but was led into Christianity by his late wife Clara, who died of cancer aged 54. He became a Catholic and his Christian name is Eric.

After his secondary education, he obtained a job with the Arewa Textiles Company, where he was elected union secretary. He became a full-time trade union organiser in 1975.

In May 2015, he married a young model, Lara Fortes.

== Education ==
Oshiomhole decided that he needed to further his education and so in 1975 he proceeded to Ruskin College at Oxford, United Kingdom, to study industrial relations, majoring in labour economics. Furthermore, in 1989, he attended the National Institute for Policy and Strategic Studies (NIPSS) in Plateau State, Nigeria, making him a Member of the National Institute (MNI).

== Career ==
=== Labour leader ===
In 1982, Oshiomhole was appointed general secretary of the National Union of Textile, Garment and Tailoring Workers of Nigeria, a union with over 75,000 workers. After democracy was restored in 1999, he became president of the Nigerian Labour Congress and was prominent as the leader of a campaign of industrial action against high oil prices in Nigeria.

Early in the administration of President Olusegun Obasanjo, he negotiated a 25% wage increase for public sector workers. In return he publicly supported Obasanjo and endorsed his candidacy when he was re-elected in 2003.

The textile workers union elected Oshiomhole for a second term as general secretary while he continued as president of the NLC (Nigeria Labour Congress).

His relationship with Obasanjo turned sour as neglect of local oil refineries led to the reliance on imported gasoline, followed by rises in the price of fuel. Oshiomhole led strikes and demonstrations against the increase. He faced arrests, tear gas and temporary blockades of union offices, and Obasanjo introduced legislation to make it more difficult for the NLC to strike. The NLC alleged that on 9 October 2004, Oshiomhole was abducted by State Security Services during a protest, but the Nigerian government said he submitted to voluntary custody.

He represented African workers for two terms on the governing body of the International Labour Organization (ILO), serving on the committee on freedom of association. He was also a member of the executive board of the International Confederation of Free Trade Unions.

=== Politics ===
In April 2007, Oshiomhole ran for governor of Edo State under the Action Congress Party, with which his Labour Party had entered a strategic alliance.

Oserheimen Osunbor of the People's Democratic Party (PDP) was declared the winner. However, the AC contested the election on the basis of various irregularities. On 20 March 2008, the Edo State election tribunal nullified the election of Osunbor and declared Oshiomhole the winner. On 11 November 2008, a federal appeal court sitting in Benin City upheld the ruling of the state's elections petitions tribunal, declaring Oshiomole to be the governor of Edo State. The decision was based on several voting irregularities.

During the 2012 Edo State gubernatorial election, he was elected to a second term, winning the elections in a massive landslide. His tenure ended on 12 November 2016.

On 23 June 2018, Oshiomhole emerged as the national chairman of the All Progressives Congress (APC) following a voice vote by delegates at the party's national convention.

On 12 November 2019, Oshiomhole was suspended from the APC after 18 local government chairmen of the party in his native state of Edo passed a vote of no confidence on him. He was accused of trying to disintegrate the party in Edo State. But a faction of the party loyal to Oshiomhole declared his suspension null and void and then suspended Governor Godwin Obaseki of the state whom they say orchestrated Oshiomhole's suspension.

On 15 January 2020, Edo APC reaffirmed the suspension of Oshiomhole and said he had no legal right to continue to function as the APC national chairman by the virtue of his suspension in Edo State. On 4 March 2020, a high court sitting in Abuja ordered the suspension of Oshiomhole from the office of the national chairman of the APC, that having been suspended from the party, Oshiomhole was no longer a member of the party and could not possibly continue to discharge his official responsibilities as national chairman with a clear order of the court that Oshiomhole be restricted from the national secretariat of the party.

Armed security agents, including the Police, Department of State Service (DSS) and Civil Defence were heavily deployed to the secretariat to prevent Oshiomhole from entering. On 5 March 2020, a federal high court in Kano gave another judgement which vacated the judgement of the Federal Capital Territory (FCT) High Court and restored Oshiomhole as the national chairman of the APC. This created confusion as to which judgement to obey because both courts (FCT High Court and Federal High Court Kano) are of equal jurisdiction and none of them could vacate the judgement of the other.

Oshiomole appealed against his suspension at the Abuja Court of Appeal and the court affirmed his suspension on 16 June 2020.

On 28 May 2022, Oshiomhole won the APC primaries for the 2023 Edo North senatorial elections. On 26 February 2023, INEC declared Oshiomhole the winner of 2023 senatorial election for Edo North senatorial district. With 107,110 votes, Oshiomhole was declared the winner of the polls, defeating the incumbent Senator Francis Alimekhena of the Peoples Democratic Party (PDP), who scored 55,344 votes.

He was named Chairman, Senate Committee on Interior of the 10th Senate, on 8 August 2023.

== Controversy ==
Public incident at Lagos Airport

In June 2025, Oshiomhole was involved in a public dispute at Murtala Muhammed Airport in Lagos following a missed Air Peace flight to Abuja. According to the airline, Oshiomhole allegedly confronted airline staff and disrupted terminal access, which caused delays for other passengers. Air Peace issued a statement condemning what it described as "unruly conduct" and reaffirmed its zero-tolerance policy for disruptions.

=== Viral video controversy and AI claims ===
In February 2026, Oshiomhole became the subject of widespread social media attention following the circulation of a video appearing to show him massaging a woman's feet aboard a private jet. The clip, which went viral on platforms including TikTok and Instagram, showed a man resembling the former governor engaged in light conversation with a woman whose feet rested on his lap.

Initial reports misidentified the woman as Lara Fortes, Oshiomhole's wife. However, subsequent investigations identified her as Leshaan Dagama, a 19-year-old South African lifestyle influencer and adult content creator who describes herself as a "Professional Sugar Baby." Reports indicated that Dagama had originally posted the video on her TikTok account before deleting it.

== Awards and honours ==
On 15 November 2011, Oshiomhole was conferred a Commander of the Order of the Niger by President Goodluck Jonathan. However, almost a year and a half later, the award was disputed by the Peoples Democratic Party's chairman, Chief Dan Orbih, who accused Oshiomhole of age falsification. He was also conferred the "Icon of Democracy" award by the Nigeria Union of Journalists on 21 November 2011.

== See also ==
- List of governors of Edo State
