= Lucky Igbinedion =

Nigerian politician (born 1957)

Governor of Edo State
- In office 29 May 1999 – 29 May 2007
- Deputy: Mike Oghiadomhe
- Preceded by: Anthony Onyearugbulem
- Succeeded by: Oserheimen Osunbor

Personal details
- Born: Lucky Nosakhare Igbinedion; 13 May 1957 (age 69)
- Party: Peoples Democratic Party
- Spouse: Eki Igbinedion
- Children: 6, including Osasu
- Parent: Gabriel Igbinedion
- Education: University of Wyoming; MBA, Jackson State University
- Profession: Politician
- Website: www.luckyigbinedion.co.za

Lucky Nosakhare Igbinedion (born 13 May 1957) is a Nigerian politician who served as the governor of Edo State from 1999 to 2007.

== Early life ==
Igbinedion was born on 13 May 1957. He is the eldest son of Gabriel Igbinedion. He holds a BSc in marketing from the University of Wyoming (1982), and MBA from Jackson State University, Mississippi, US (1983).

== Career ==
Igbinedion was appointed Mayor of Oredo from 1987 to 1989. In December 1991 as a candidate of the National Republican Convention, he lost the election for the office of governor of Edo State to John Odigie Oyegun.

In the 1999 Edo State gubernatorial election under PDP, Igbinedion was elected governor of Edo State. In 2003 he was reelected for a second term, an office he held with his deputy, Mike Oghiadomhe until 29 May 2007.

During the period of his governorship, he established the Edo State Polytechnic, Usen and was elected by his colleagues as Chairman of the Nigerian Governors' Forum (NGF).

His wife, Eki Igbinedion, was active against the widespread sex trafficking of women from Edo State to Europe. Eki Igbinedion founded the Idia Renaissance, a non governmental organization to combat trafficking in persons.

== Later life ==
In January 2008, he was declared wanted by the Economic and Financial Crimes Commission on allegations of financial fraud. The EFCC accused him of having embezzled US$24 million (£12m) using front companies. He handed himself over later that month. The Benin Youth Council asked for an apology for statements implying he ran away from justice.

In December 2008, he was convicted by a court, but was controversially asked to pay a paltry sum of $25,750 in fines.

In November 2021, he was also invited by the Economic and Financial Crimes Commission over alleged criminal diversion of public fund to the tune of 1.6bn. He has not been charged since then.

== See also ==
- List of governors of Edo State
