= Mid-Western Region, Nigeria =

1963–1991 division of Nigeria

The Mid-Western Region was a division of Nigeria from 1963 to 1991, known as the Bendel state after 1976.

== History ==
It was formed in June 1963 from Benin and Delta provinces of the Western Region, and its capital was Benin City. It was renamed a province in 1966, and in 1967 when the other provinces were divided into several states, it remained territorially intact, becoming a state.

During the Nigerian Civil War, the Biafran forces invaded the new Mid-Western state, en route to Lagos, in an attempt to force a quick end to the war. While under a short-lived Biafran occupation, the state was declared the "Republic of Benin". As Nigerian forces retook the region, the republic collapsed only a day after the declaration when Nigerian troops captured Benin City.

In 1976, the state was renamed Bendel, and in 1991 was divided into Delta State and Edo State.

== Demographics ==
The region was composed of the old Benin and Delta Provinces. The Benin provinces had Owan, Ishan, Bini, and Afenmai/Etsako speaking people while the Delta province had Okpe, Ijaw, Isekiri, Urhobo, Isoko, Ika, Ukwani, Aniocha, Oshimilli, Ndokwa.

== Economy ==
The region had a timber and rubber industry in Sapele which was also supported by a port. In addition, it produced palm related products, maize, beans and other food produce for household consumption. In the Southern Delta province, oil was discovered and was positioned to benefit the region.

== Notable people ==
- Ambrose Folorunsho Alli – politician and academic, first governor of Bendel State
- Demas Akpore – politician and academic, first deputy governor of Bendel State
