= Usen =

Sub-ethnic of the Yoruba

- Ode Awure
- Location within Nigeria
- Location: Ovia South-West, Edo State, Nigeria
- Nearest town: Okada, Idanre, Ore
- Coordinates: 6°44′41″N 5°20′38″E
- Area: 418 km^{2} (161 sq mi)

Ode Usen, also known as Ufe kekere and Ode Awure, is the name of a small town in Edo state, Nigeria. It also doubles as the name of a Yoruba subgroup consisting of culturally related villages situated between Ofosu in the west and Ogbese in the east. Usen is surrounded on all sides by smaller villages and farmsteads known in the local Yoruba dialect as Egunre. some of the villages under the authority of Usen include; Arere, Oladaro, Arekpa, Ogunweyin, Ogidigbo, Ilorin (Ulorin), Ukankan, Ajegunle, Obome, Aghakpo, Leleji, Ofaran, Okeodo, Adeyanba, Egunre Osogban. These villages were all founded by people from Usen and speak the same dialect of the Yoruba language. There are also other communities that speak the same dialect of the Yoruba language as Usen, such as; Egbeta, Utese and Igue Ogho between Ekiadọlọ and Usen.

== Name ==
Usẹn is the latest name of the town previously known as 'Ufẹ kekere' (small Ifẹ) and 'Ode Awure'. There are two popular narratives about the name's origin. The first (more popular among the natives of Usen itself) contends that the name is derived from its location at the base of a large Ackee tree; (Uṣẹn in SEY, Uṣin in CY, Iṣin in NWY). It was from the base of this landmark tree (Idi Uṣin/Uṣẹn, lit.; 'foot of the ackee tree') where the people settled after losing the battle of Omi funfun to the people of Ufẹ Oke (Idanre), that the resurgent settlement which took its name arose. Usen was thus not the village and people's name from inception. The second version (more popular among the Benins) contends that the name is derived from the phrase Usienre in Edo, meaning 'Five days'. The purport for this second version is that Oranmiyan muttered this phrase to Afelogiyan as a promise to return to that location from the expedition/journey into Benin in five days time. However, based on known historical facts, Oranmiyan, a prince born and raised in Ife had zero knowledge of the Edo language to have made such a statement, neither did Afelogiyan.

== Geography ==
Usen territory is situated in the northwestern portions of southern Edo state in the geographical Southwest of Nigeria, It is physically bound by the Ofosu river in the west, forming the local boundary with Idanre local government of Ondo state while the Ala and Ogbese tributaries of the Osse river are situated along its eastern flank forming another local boundary with the Okeluse and Ute area in Ose local government area of Ondo state. The Aden river runs through the middle of the territory. The area covers approximately 416 km^{2} of land and lies almost equidistant (halfway) between Akure and Benin at 59 km southeast of the former and 55 km northwest of the latter as the crow flies. The natural vegetation of the land is tropical rain forest and the area is surrounded by dense woodland comprising the southern portion of the Akure Ofosu Forest Reserve. The town had a population of 4,109 in 19991, and around 30,000 people in 2008. The town serves as a local center for the local production and collection of Cocoa, Timber logs and Palm oil products from the surrounding farmsteads.

=== Sights ===
Some notable sights and geographic features in the town and its environs include:

- Erede stream
- Olu Awure's palace
- Esu Olofen
- Eseje festival
- Omomi waterfalls
- Odu waterfalls

== History ==
Ode Awure originated as a farmstead founded around the 10th century C.E by some indigenes of Ufe (Ile Ife) led by one Oyebo, however, the first crowned ruler of Usen was prince Afelogiyan a brother to prince Oranmiyan, the founder and progenitor of the current dynasty of Edo kings. They were both progeny to the Olofen in Ife (Uhe) who were both on their way to the present day Benin, The site of the original farmstead from which Usen sprung is situated in the present Odomukpe quarters of town. Folk oral tradition has it that during one of his hunting expeditions into the surrounding forest, he discovered a stream/river which he named Ẹri Ọdẹ (i.e. Hunter's stream). This stream is today believed to possess some mythical properties and is one of the most revered deities of the people belonging to the Usen cultural community today. According to Usen traditions, the town and the adjacent area is the pivot of an Ife derived cultural colonization.

In the political structure of the Benin region, the so called ambassador province was under the authority of the Olu Awure (Elawure) and was considered to be the conduit region for correspondence between the Yoruba and Benin kingdoms.

In the year 1897, Major Roupell, a British officer in Benin wrote; "The country is entirely Yoruba in its customs, Yoruba is everywhere spoken"

== Traditional institutions ==
The usen community is ruled by Oba Oluogbe II, the Olu Awure (Elawure) of Usen, the seat of power is the Aghofen or royal palace. The king is assisted by a council of hereditary (and appointed) chiefs like the Aro, the Olusoyen, the Obateru, the Elemo/Elema, the Odofin, the Eribo, the Ologbosere, Asoron Oba (Eson), the Olulemo, the Arase, the Osuma, the Asamo/Asama, the Asoron-ogwa (Ashorongwa or Oshorun), the Ojomo and their leader the Oliha amongst others. The current Olu Awure is said to be the 33rd Oba of Ode Awure in memory. Major deities venerated in the town include: Ogun, Ora, Sango, Uja, Uwen, Ifa (Oronmila), Erede (Eri Ode), Osanyin (Orhanyin) amongst others. The principal seat/shrine/grove of the state deities of Benin, otherwise known as Ebo n'Edo, is actually situated in Usen and overseen by the Oligho who is chief priest.

The Osolo (Eholor) is the high priest of Oluwa Ogun and was one of the titles conferred on some of the major personalties that were in the same journey with Oranmiyan and Afelogiyan from ife; The Oliha and Ine, The Odofin (Edohen) who is the second ranking Awo right after the Oluwo with the Ojomo (Ezomo), The Aro (Ero) who is the third ranking awo after the Oluwo and the Odofin with the Elemo (Elama), The Osolo and Olotun (Oloton), were also replicated from the Ife institutions and conferred there at Usen. As a result, all the original titles of the highest ranking Benin chiefs that continued on the expedition with prince Oranmiyan to Benin are exactly mirrored in Usen. Others included; The Asoron (Eson) and The Asamo (Esama). Irado (Erando), the founder of Utese, and the Arujale Ojima of Okeluse amongst others were personages who were known to have later subsequently migrated away from Ode Awure (Usen)

The Jegun reigning dynasty of kings in Ode Idepe (Okitipupa) among the Ikale Yoruba group also migrated from Usen, as explicitly expoused in the Oríkì (praise panegyrics) of the Okitipupa people which reads:

- Ọma Jẹgun abé yàn méjì, ọnọ́jà kè he'e wáro - We are the descendants of Jegun
- Ọma ọnọ́jà tí a kà gbé uwẹn lé - The children of the town folks that constructed a stand for uwen
- Jẹ́ eruku máà kù uwẹn ara - So that dust would not gather on the uwen deity
- Olúwẹn r'uwẹn - The priest of Uwen must carry uwen
- Ògbòrì r'uwen egúngún - The uninitiated (ogbori) who carries it would join the eegun
- Jí ìréré tí ulé uba bí ẹnẹ ní Òde Usọyẹn - The house of the father that birthed us is at Ode Usen
- Ọma Jẹgunyọmí Àbẹ̀joyè - The children of Jegunyomi Abejoye
- Oge fifun yèé ṣe Ọba Usẹn - The white fashioned Oba of Usen

Usen can thus be aptly described as a secondary point of migration for many of the various surrounding towns, including; Ode idepe (Okitipupa), Utese, Okeluse etc. The Yeye Erede is the high priestess of the Eri Ode stream.

Oba Afelogiyan was the first ruler while Oba Alakaye was the tenth. The current ruler, Oba Oluogbe II was preceded by Oba Ufeluyi II and before him by Oba Agbaramuda II (Agbaramuda Oron). The heir Apparent crown princes in the Usen kingdom possess and are known by the title: Oronmija

== List of rulers of the Usen Kingdom ==
The list of past Obas of Usen was largely compiled by H. F. Marshall (Sir Hugo), who was the British assistant district officer based in the Benin Division, who did extensive ethnological work in the surrounding region. He visited the Aghofen (palace) of Usen in the 1930s and got some oral accounts of names that could be remembered. His work was published under the title; Intelligence report on Usehin district, Benin division, Benin province, 1939. It is one of the oldest dynasties in Edo state.

=== Beginning of The Afelogiyan dynasty ===
- Aladin - 1st
- Ogbogbomudu - 2nd
- Atakumara - 3rd
- Olowogudu - 4th
- Oba Afelogiyan - 5th
- Oba Obamoroyetufe - 6th
- Oba Aranmari - 7th
- Oba Ajagbolu - 8th
- Oba Igben - 9th

Name	Lifespan	Reign start	Reign end	Notes	Family	Image
Oba Alakaye				10th Olu Awure. Usen suffered a major defeat to Idanre (Ufe Oke), leaving Okede (Oliha) as the only standing quarter of town. At the battle of Omi funfun, the river Ofosu was agreed as the boundary between the Idanre and Usen kingdoms.	House of Afelogiyan	
Oba Oluogbe I				11th Olu Awure. Under him, the name Usen, [reflected in the old colonial maps as Ushin (Usehin)] had become the more popular name of Ode Awure, which had largely fallen into disuse.	House of Afelogiyan	
Oba Usẹnmero				12th Olu Awure.	House of Afelogiyan	
Oba Obara				13th Olu Awure.	House of Afelogiyan	
Oba Agbaramuda I				14th Olu Awure.	House of Afelogiyan	
Oba Arodolu				15th Olu Awure.	House of Afelogiyan	
Oba Ufeluyi I				16th Olu Awure.	House of Afelogiyan	
Oba Ogborogboro				17th Olu Awure.	House of Afelogiyan	
Oba Olibara: Omode Uwenlarere				18th Olu Awure.	House of Afelogiyan	
Oba Lukpekpeghe				19th Olu Awure.	House of Afelogiyan	
Oba Akeriha				20th Olu Awure. Liberalized the performance of Agbala music and dance, the most revered Usen traditional performance which was once only performed for royals.	House of Afelogiyan	
Oba Olujofi				21st Olu Awure.	House of Afelogiyan	
Oba Ajibulu				22nd Olu Awure.	House of Afelogiyan	
Oba Olurọkpo I				23rd Olu Awure.	House of Afelogiyan	
Oba Ugbolumaja				24th Olu Awure.	House of Afelogiyan	
Oba Olugun				25th Olu Awure.	House of Afelogiyan	
Oba Ooduamufẹ: Oduduwamufẹ				26th Olu Awure.	House of Afelogiyan	
Oba Olugbiyelokun				27th Olu Awure.	House of Afelogiyan	
Oba Oburọmusen				28th Olu Awure.	House of Afelogiyan	
Arisoyen Osasheyi				Regent	House of Afelogiyan	
Oba Olurọkpo II				30th Olu Awure	House of Afelogiyan	
Oba Agbaramuda II: Agbaramuda Ọrọn				31st Olu Awure. Born to Osasheyi. Was considered too young to rule when his father died, so his uncles Arisoyen and Akinsola fought themselves to rule as regents. The denizens supported Arisoyen who ruled for some years.	House of Afelogiyan	
Oba Ufeluyi II: Ufeluhi	b.1921	7 December 1974; Ode Awure	2006	32nd Olu Awure. Son of Agbaramuda II and Tomola a daughter of the Eribo family of Usen. Granted the Nigerian Institute for Palm Oil Research (NIFOR) permission to establish Oil Palm plantations on 360 hectares of communal lands in 1980. Became Oba at the age of 53.	House of Afelogiyan	
Oba Oluogbe II		1 February 2007; Ode Awure	___	33rd and current reigning Olu Awure	House of Afelogiyan	

=== Festivals ===
Common cultural festivals in Usen include the Erede festival, Udasu (New Yam) festival, Eseje festival.

== Dialect ==
The Usẹn speech is a dialect of the Yoruba language, sharing around 69.3% cognacy with standard Yoruba based on a wordlist produced by Ibadan residents. However, it shares a significantly higher degree of similarity with the south eastern Yoruba (SEY) dialectal grouping, exhibiting the highest degree of similarity at more than 80% cognacy with the Ikale dialect, as well as with the Ifon (ose) dialect. 78% with Ogho (Owo), 75% with Ondo, 74% with Ilaje and Ikare Akoko, 70% with Ijebu and Ao. It was found to be mutually intelligible with the Yoruba language based on analytical methods utilizing lexicostatistics and data based field research. It is thus classified within the southeastern dialects of the Yoruba language.

Majority of the natives of the central town of Usen are bilingual in both Usen and Edo.

== Institutions and facilities ==
Usen community is host to the following educational institutions of learning:

- Atamabale Primary School
- Adeyanba Primary School
- Osasheyi Primary School
- Elawure Grammar School
- Edo State Polytechnic, Usen is a tertiary educational institution. It was previously known as Edo State Institute of Technology & Management (ESITM) Usen. Founded in 2002, the current rector is Professor Abiodun Falodun.

== See also ==
- Okada Town
