= Igueben train station kidnapping =

2023 kidnapping in Edo State, Nigeria

- Part of Nigerian bandit conflict
- Location: Igueben, Edo State, Nigeria
- Date: 7 January 2023
- Injuries: Unknown
- Victim: 32 kidnapped
- Perpetrator: Fulani herdsmen

On 7 January 2023, thirty-two people were kidnapped by bandits at a train station in Igueben, Edo State, Nigeria. All were freed on 17 January.

== Prelude ==
Kidnapping for ransom is a common tactic used by gangs across Nigeria, although is usually relegated to the north of the country around Kaduna State. Edo State, in southern Nigeria, took legal measures to prevent kidnapping in the 2010s after several high-ranking judges were kidnapped, although kidnappings continued throughout the state at a lower level. In the run-up to the 2023 Nigerian presidential election, southern and southeastern Nigeria was embroiled in political violence, with Edo State consumed as well.

== Kidnapping ==
The kidnappers came out of the bush near the train station at Igueben around twenty minutes before a train headed to Warri was set to arrive. As they came out of the bush, the kidnappers shot into the air, injuring some civilians. They then abducted thirty-two people, including the station manager and clerk. Survivors blamed the lack of security at the station for the success of the attack. One woman managed to escape the kidnapping with her baby, and later two children abducted in the attack were dropped off at a nearby gas station with their parents contacted.

The Edo State police commissioner alleged the perpetrators to be Fulani herdsmen.

== Aftermath ==
By 17 January, all of the abductees had been rescued by Nigerian authorities. Two village chiefs and five kidnappers were arrested and charged for the kidnapping.
