= Federal College of Education Technical, Ekiadolor =

College in Edo State, Nigeria

Federal College of Education Technical, Ekiadolor (FCET), formerly the College of Educatiaon, Ekiadolor, is a government owned College of Education located in Edo State, Southern part of Nigeria. The Institution was established in 1980 under the administration of Professor Ambrose Folorunsho Alli of the defunct Bendel State. It becamea federal college in 2022.

== History ==
=== College of Educatiaon, Ekiadolor ===
College of Educatiaon, Ekiadolor was a government owned College of Education located in Edo State, Southern part of Nigeria. The Institution was established in 1980 under the administration of Professor Ambrose Folorunsho Alli of the defunct Bendel State. It was College is one of the government approved tertiary institutions in Nigeria. The Institution served as a Centre for training of School Teachers in Nigeria. The College of Education awards National Certificates in Education (NCE) to its graduates. NCE is a mandatory requirement for those who want to work as a teacher in a Nigerian school. The College is one of the three tertiary Colleges of Education in Edo State, with the other two being College of Education, Igueben and College of Agriculture, Iguoriakhi.

Edo State College of Education was closed down by the then Governor of Edo State, Comrade Adams A. Oshiomhole, with plans to upgrade the college to a University of Education. It was proposed that the College of Education will be upgraded to Tayo Akpata University of Education, Ekiadolor. However, the plan never materialized. This led to series of protests by the indigenes of Ekiadolor and neighboring communities for the restoration of the institution to its original state as a College of Education.

=== Federal College of Education Technical, Ekiadolor ===
In 2020, the Federal Government of Nigeria, through the Minister of Education, announced plans to establish six new Federal Colleges of Education in Nigeria. One of the six Federal Colleges of Education was set up using the facilities of Tayo Akpata University of Education in Ekiadolor. In April 2022, the Edo State College of Education was turned over to the government of Nigeria and became the Federal College of Educational Technical, Ekiadolor.

The new federal college opened for students on 2 December 2022, with lectures starting on 19 December.

== College Library ==
The College of Education Library, Ekiadolor, is the nerve centre of the parent institution. The library is made up of Administrative unit, Circulation unit, Periodicals and Special collection section and it houses books, periodicals, manuscripts, journals, newspapers, maps, prints, documents, e-books and films which help students and staffs of the institution.
