= Oseni (surname) =

Òsénì
- Gender: Male
- Languages: Yoruba, Hausa

Origin
- Origin: Nigerian
- Meaning: Good, fine, handsome, charming.
- Region of origin: South West, Nigeria

Òsénì is a Nigerian male given name and surname predominantly used among Muslims, particularly within the Yoruba and Hausa communities. Derived from Arabic, "Hussain/Husayn/Hussein/Hosni", the name which signifies "good, fine, handsome, charming." Which the Yoruba/Hausa dialectal variation is Òsénì.

== Notable individuals with the name ==
- Ganiyu Oseni (born 1991), Nigerian footballer
- Azeez Oseni (born 2002), Nigerian professional footballer
- Yakubu Oseni (born 1975), Nigerian politician
- Zakariyau Oseni (born 1950), Nigerian scholar, imam, and poet
- Waheed Oseni (born 1988), Nigerian footballer
