= Emotan =

Edo figure

Emotan (fl. 1440–1473) was a market woman who traded in foodstuffs around the Oba Market in the ancient Benin kingdom during the reign of Oba Uwaifiokun and Prince Ogun, who later took the name "Oba Ewuare the Great" after becoming the Oba of Benin.

She is the pioneer of the first day care centre in Benin City; oral history said she assisted Oba Ewuare in reclaiming the throne as Oba of Benin after several years in exile.

== Life ==
Emotan (real name Uwaraye), was born in Eyaen between 1380 and 1400. After the death of her husband, she constructed a hut where she attended to the needs of children.

Emotan was instrumental in Ewuare's reclaiming the throne as Oba of Benin after she told him of a murder plot against him made by Uwaifiokun and some chiefs during his time in exile. Ewuare went on to appoint Emotan as the Iyeki (English: leader of the authorized Ekpate guild), a position given to someone with the task of enforcing market rules and checkmating security matters.

== Deification ==
After the death of Emotan, Oba Ewuare deified her by ordering the planting of the sacred Uruhe tree at the same spot where she used to display her wares. He went on to make a decree that homage must be paid to Emotan by persons who are celebrating any form of ceremonial gathering.

== Emotan Statue ==
A life sized, bronze Emotan Statue was designed in honour of the legacy set by Emotan after two Uruhe trees, that were planted on separate occasions, fell. The statue was designed by John A. Danford and was unveiled by Oba Akenzua II in cooperation with the British Colonial authorities on May 20, 1954. The statue is presently located at the Oba Market in Benin City, Edo State.
