= Tom Ikimi =

Nigerian politician

Chief Tom Ikimi
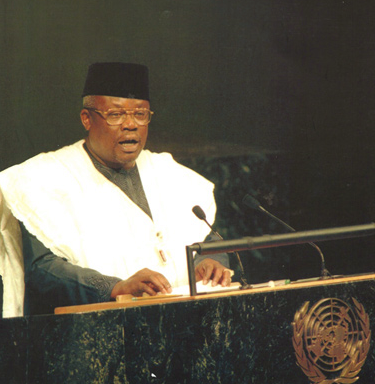

Foreign Affairs Minister
- In office 1995–1998

Personal details
- Born: 10 April 1944 (age 82)
- Profession: Politician
- Website: http://www.chieftomikimi.net

Chief Tom Ikimi (born 10 April 1944) is a Nigerian politician and architect who served as minister of foreign affairs from 1995 to 1998. He was appointed chairman of ECOWAS Council of Ministers and ECOWAS Committee of Nine on Liberia (C-9) on 26 July 1996. He has also served as chairman of the defunct National Republican Convention (NRC) and was a founding member of the All Progressives Congress (APC).

== Early life and education ==
Ikimi was born in Kumba, Southern British Cameroons (modern-day Cameroon) to John Onile Ikimi and Victoria Isiemoa Ikimi, both from Igueben, Igueben Local Government Area, Edo State. He attended St. Joseph's College, Sasse, Buea, Southern Cameroons, from 1957 to 1961. He was a pioneer student of the Midwestern Polytechnic, Auchi, Midwestern Nigeria (now Auchi Polytechnic, Edo State), for his technical education from January 1966 to December 1967 (building and civil engineering), where he obtained an Ordinary National Diploma. He was a pioneer member of the students union, a keen sportsman and established the College Athletics Club.

His professional education in architecture was at the Ahmadu Bello University, Architectural School, Zaria, from 1968 to 1973, where he obtained the B. Arch (Hons) degree. Ikimi was a member of the student union and National Union of Nigerian Students (NUNS). He moved the motion in late 1970 at the NUNS convention in Zaria to readmit the Eastern Unions back into the NUNS at the end of the civil war.

He was a pioneer member of the National Youth Service Corps programme, serving in Ibadan, western Nigeria, from 1973 to 1974. He worked as an architect in the firm of planning partnership, later at IBRU Vaughan Richards & Partners, Lagos, from 1974 to 1977 and was made associate partner in 1975. He established his own firm, Tom Ikimi Design Company in May 1977 and executed a number of private and commercial projects within and outside Nigeria, from 1977 to 1993. He later won the international competition for the OAU office and conference centre project in Addis Ababa, Ethiopia. He is a fellow of the Nigerian Institute of Architects (FNIA) and has business interests in construction, trade and farming.

== Positions held ==
- Member, Constituent Assembly from 1988 to 1989.
- Member, Chapter 2 Committee "Fundamental Objectives and Directives Principles of State Policy".
- National Chairman of the National Republican Convention Party from 1990 to 1992.
- He was the special adviser to the head of state, commander-in-chief, General Sani Abacha in February 1994, where he prepared the memo for the establishment of the Petroleum Trust Fund (PTF).
- He was appointed foreign affairs minister in March 1995.

=== Functions at the United Nations ===
Ikimi led Nigeria's delegation to the Review/Extension Conference of the Parties to the Treaty on the Non-Proliferation of Nuclear Weapons (NPT) in New York City, delivering the national position address on 18 April 1995.

He headed the delegation to the ministerial meeting of the Coordinating Bureau of the Non-Aligned Movement (NAM) in Bandung, Indonesia, from 25 to 27 April 1995.

Ikimi represented the head of state, commander-in-chief, at the 40th anniversary meeting of the Movement of Non-Aligned Countries in Bandung, Indonesia, on 28 April 1995.

He led the delegation to the ministerial meeting of the Coordinating Bureau of the Non-Aligned Movement in Cartagena, Colombia, from 18 to 20 May 1998, delivering Nigeria's statement on 19 May 1998.

Taking charge of the delegation, Ikimi oversaw Nigeria's participation in the Special UN Security Council Session for Foreign Ministers in New York City, delivering the country's statement on 26 September 1995.

He led the delegation to the 50th Commemorative Session of the United Nations General Assembly (UNGA) from September to December 1995, delivering Nigeria's statement to the Assembly on 3 October 1995.

Serving as the president of the United Nations Security Council in October 1995, Ikimi hosted Pope John Paul II at the UN 50th Anniversary celebration in the capacity of President of the Security Council.

He represented the head of state, commander-in-chief, at the summit meeting of the non-aligned member countries of the United Nations Security Council in New York City on 4 October 1995.

Continuing his leadership, Ikimi headed the delegation to the 51st Session of the United Nations General Assembly (UNGA) from September to December 1996, delivering Nigeria's statement on 3 October 1996.

He also represented the head of state at the 11th Summit of the Non-Aligned countries in Cartagena, Colombia, from 18 to 20 October 1998, delivering Nigeria's statement on 18 October 1998.

Ikimi led the delegation to the 52nd Session of the United Nations General Assembly (UNGA) from September to December 1997, delivering Nigeria's statement on 23 September 1997.

=== Functions at ECOWAS ===
- Chairman of ECOWAS Council of Ministers and ECOWAS Committee of Nine on Liberia (C-9) on 26 July 1996.
- Chairman of ECOWAS Ministerial Committee of Five on Sierra Leone.
- Led Nigeria's delegation to and chaired the 4th meeting of the ECOWAS Ministerial Committee of Four on Sierra Leone (C-4) in New York, on 11 July 1997.
- Led the delegation of the ECOWAS Ministerial Committee of Five (C-5) to New York and briefed both the Secretary-General and the Security Council under the Arria Formula on the situation in Sierra Leone, on 11 November 1997.
- Led Nigeria's delegation to and chaired the 8th meeting of the ECOWAS Ministerial Committee of Five on Sierra Leone (C-5) in New York, from 5 to 6 February 1998.
- Led Nigeria's delegation to several ECOWAS ministerial meetings and Head of State summits around the subregion.
- Led the ECOWAS ministerial committee of nine (C-9) to successfully resolve the Liberian crisis.
- Supervised under the United Nations, the holding of the first postwar democratic election in Liberia in August 1997 and the establishment of a democratic government headed by Charles G. Taylor.

=== Roles in Sierra Leone ===
The violent overthrow of the government of President Ahmad Tejan Kabbah on 25 May 1997 posed a threat not only to the peace and security of Sierra Leone but also to the security and stability of the West African subregion. As chairman of the committee of four and five on Sierra Leone, he led negotiations and coordinated the delicate operations leading to the successful restoration of the government of President Ahmad Tejan Kabbah on 10 March 1998. He led the ECOWAS team and was the first to enter Sierra Leone to assess the situation on the ground after the liberation of Freetown from the rebels by ECOMOG forces on 18 to 19 February 1998 to permit the return of President Ahmad Tejan Kabbah from exile in Conakry.

=== Roles at the Organisation of African Unity ===
His tenure as foreign minister coincided with the period when the West African subregion and indeed much of Africa was beset with conflicts, which included civil wars in Angola, Rwanda/Burundi, Zaire (now Democratic Republic of Congo), the Sudan, Liberia, Somalia and Sierra Leone. The central organ of the OAU was established in Cairo in 1994 as a mechanism for resolving these conflicts. In his tenure, Nigeria retained her membership of the central organ in the three successive elections that were conducted annually. Aside from the several meetings of the OAU council of ministers, Ikimi represented the Nigerian head of state at the summit meeting of the Central Organ of the OAU Mechanism for the Prevention, Management and Resolution of Conflicts in Tunis on 20 April 1995. He led Nigeria's delegation to the 31st OAU Assembly of Heads of State and Government at Addis Ababa, Ethiopia, from 26 to 28 June 1995; in Cameroon, from 9 to 10 July 1996; at the 32nd OAU Assembly in Zimbabwe, from 1 to 3 June 1997; and in Burkina Faso, on 8 June 1998.

== Politics ==
- He was a founding member and member of the Board of Trustees of the All Peoples Party (APP) from 1999 to 2001
- He accepted the invitation to join the PDP on 22 September 2001 and became the chairman of the party's National Convention Presidential Election Panel in January 2003. He coordinated the PDP primary election at Eagle Square that returned Olusegun Obasanjo as presidential candidate.
- He was a founding member and national leader of the Advanced Congress of Democrats (ACD) from 2005 to 2006. The party was inaugurated in Edo State on 21 February 2006.
- He was a founding member and member of national caucus of the Action Congress (AC) Party from 2006 to 2010. He led the party to win the governorship elections in Edo State in 2007 and 2012.
- He served as coordinating chairman of merger talks of the major opposition parties ACN, ANPP, and CPC. The parties merged to form All Progressives Congress (APC) in July 2013. He was member of the Interim Executive Committee (IEC) of the All Progressives Congress (APC) serving as national vice chairman south-south geopolitical zone, in July 2013.
- He withdrew his membership from the All Progressives Congress on 27 August 2014.

== Honours ==
He was honoured by Pope John Paul II in 1993 with the Knight of St. Gregory The Great (KSG). In March 2003, he was honoured by the Rivers State University of Science and Technology, with a D.Sc. in Architecture. He was honoured with the title, Akinrogun of Ife by the Ooni of Ife, in 1991. He Inherited the family title of the Inneh of Igueben, in his homeland of Igueben, Esanland, Edo State, in 1988. The title Oduma of Igueben was conferred upon him by the community in 1993.

== Personal life ==
He is married, with three sons and a daughter. He is a Roman Catholic.

Political offices
Preceded by Babagana Kingibe	Foreign Minister of Nigeria; 1995 – 1998	Succeeded by Ignatius Olisemeka
