= Joseph Ikpea =

Nigerian politician

Joseph Igiagbe Ikpea
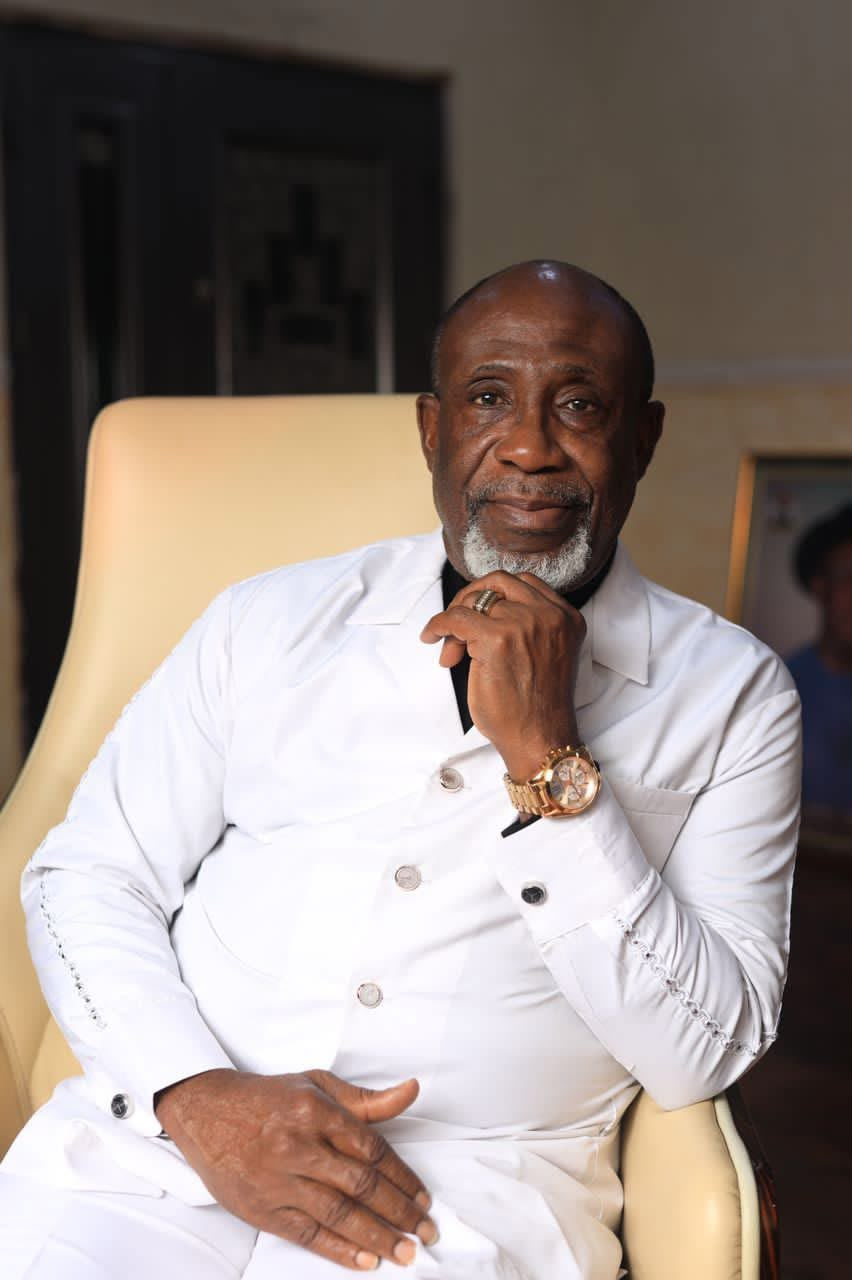

Senator of the Federal Republic of Nigeria from Edo Central Senatorial District
- In office October 8, 2025 – 2029
- Constituency: Edo Central Senatorial District

Personal details
- Born: 22 March 1962 (age 64) Ewato, Edo State
- Party: All Progressives Congress (APC)
- Education: The European University of America
- Profession: politician

Joseph Igiagbe Ikpea (born 22 March 1962) is a Nigerian politician who currently serves as the senator representing the Edo Central Senatorial District of Edo State in the Nigerian Senate, on the platform of All Progressives Congress (APC).

== Background ==
Joseph Igiagbe Ikpea was born on 22 March 1962 in Ewato, Esan South-East Local Government, Edo State. He was awarded an Honorary Degree in Doctor of Arts in Public Administration and Leadership from the The European University of America in 2015.

== Public positions ==
Ikpea served as chairman of the Edo State Library Board and represented Edo Central on the Universal Basic Education Board (UBEB).

In 2013, he served as Executive Chairman of Esan South-East Local Government Area.

He served under the Edo State Executive Council as the Commissioner for Minerals, Oil and Gas under the administration of Governor Godwin Obaseki.

== Senate career ==
Ikpea contested in the 2025 By-Election for Edo Central Senatorial District senate seat under the All Progressives Congress (APC), he won by 105,129 votes and was elected on 17 August 2025.

On 8 October 2025, he was inaugurated as a senator in the 10th National Assembly of Nigeria, representing Edo Central Senatorial District of Edo State.
