= Felix Olorunfemi =

Anglican bishop in Nigeria

- Born: 8 June 1966 (age 60); Kogi state
- Citizenship: Nigerian
- Education: Ikpomaza Grammar
- Occupation: Teaching

Felix Olorunfemi (born 8 June 1966) is the Anglican Bishop of Etsako in Bendel Province of the Church of Nigeria.

He was consecrated as the second Bishop of Etsako in Lokoja in March 2020.

He had previously been Archdeacon of the Agbor-Obi Archdeaconry in Ika diocese.

Olorunfemi was born on 8 June 1966 in Okpella, Etsako, Edo State, where he went to primary school and then Ikpomaza Grammar

School and our Lady of Fatima College, Auchi.

He is a graduate of Bendel State University and of Ezekiel College of Theology, Ekpoma, with a Diploma in Theology in 2005.

Olorunfemi taught English at Mary and Martha Juniorate Convent, Igbodo, from 2002 to 2007 under the then Principal, Godfrey Ifeanyichukwu Ekpenisi.
