= Ilushi =

Coordinates: 6.66970°N 6.62903°E

Ilushi (sometimes spelled Illushi) is a riverine community located along the Niger River in Edo State, Nigeria. It lies in the Esan South-East Local Government Area, though its people are of Igala origin and part of Uloshi land.

Ilushi is situated near the border with Kogi State, Anambra State and Delta State, making it an important location for fishing and trade. Historically, Ilushi and its surrounding communities were part of the Igala Kingdom, but are now included in Edo State.

The Ilushi people (also known as Olu people) are a subgroup of the Igala ethnic group, residing along the Niger River in present-day Edo State. They speak an Olu dialect of the Igala language, and share deep cultural, historical, and linguistic ties with the Igala Kingdom in Kogi State.

== Origins and identity ==
The Ilushi people trace their roots to the Igala Kingdom, which was historically influential in the Niger-Benue region. They are part of the larger Uloshi land, which includes communities like Okpokporo, Odo-Egwume, Igbamaka, and others. Despite being administratively placed in the Esan South-East Local Government Area, they remain distinct from the Esan people in terms of language, culture, and traditions.

== Culture and traditions ==
The Ilushi people maintain Igala cultural practices, including chieftaincy titles, traditional festivals, and religious beliefs. They primarily engage in fishing, farming, and trade, benefiting from their strategic location along the Niger River. Their language, though influenced by neighboring communities, remains a dialect of Igala, and they refer to their father as Attah, a term also used in the Igala Kingdom.

== Challenges and identity struggles ==
Due to colonial and administrative changes, Ilushi and other Olu-Igala communities were placed under Edo State governance, despite their Igala heritage. This has led to some confusion in their identity, with official records sometimes misclassifying them as Esan, even though they do not speak Esan or follow Esan traditions.

The people of Ilushi continue to assert their Igala identity, advocating for recognition of their true historical and cultural roots. Their major occupation is farming, fishing and other productions of unfinished goods.
