= Edo State Polytechnic =

Polytechnic in Usen, Edo State, Nigeria

Edo State Polytechnic, Usen
- Former names: Edo State Institute of Technology and Management
- Motto: Brain and Skill
- Established: 2002
- Rector: Engr. Sylvester Omoruyi
- Location: Usen, Edo State, Nigeria; 6°44′01″N 5°23′20″E
- Website: https://www.edopoly.edu.ng

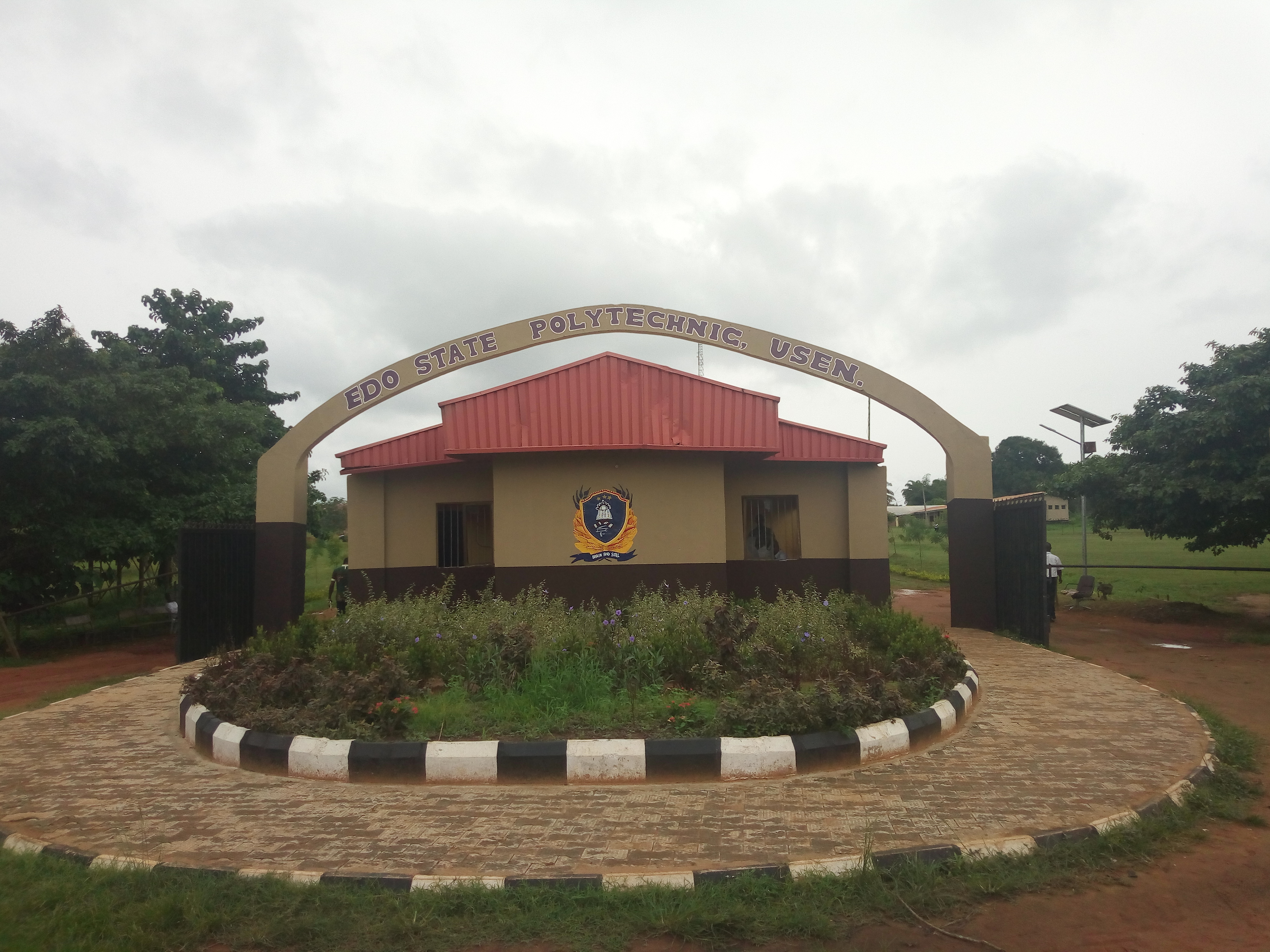
Main entrance to Edo State Polytechnic Usen

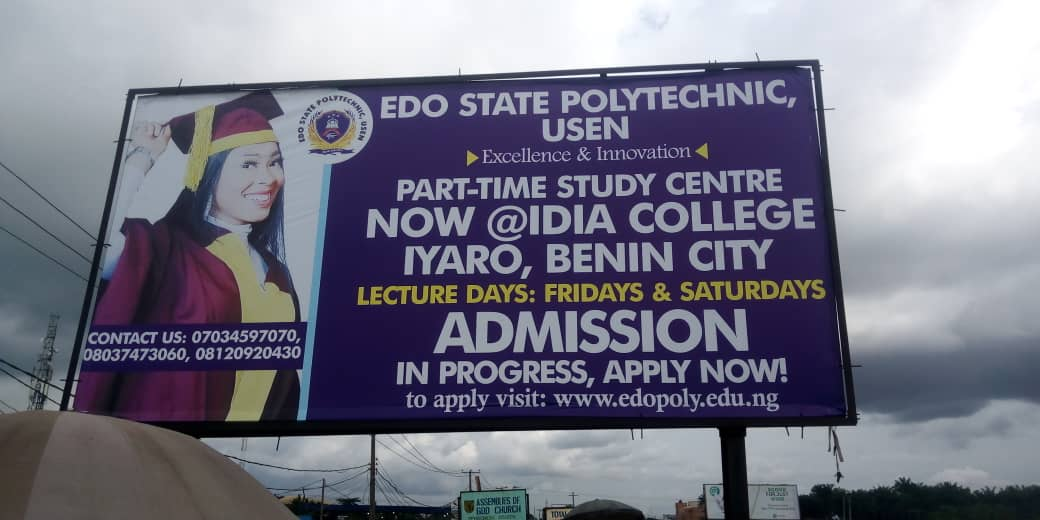
Edo State Polytechnic Sign Post

Edo State Polytechnic Usen is a higher institution of learning located in Usen community of Ovia South West local government area of Edo State, Nigeria. It was formerly known as Edo State Institute of Technology and Management (ESITM) Usen.

== Background ==
The polytechnic was founded in 2002 by the former governor of Edo State, Chief (Dr.) Lucky Nosakhare Igbinedion. Governor Godwin Obaseki, in May, 2019, signed a bill into law officially changing the name of the school from Edo State Institute of Technology and Management (ESITM), Usen to Edo State Polytechnic, Usen, as part of reforms to reposition the school for greater impact.

The school runs four schools, with a total of 21 academic programmes. The institution's programmes are accredited by Nigeria's National Board for Technical Education.

The formal rector, Abiodun Falodun from 2018 - 2022, is a pharmaceutical chemist.

The rector, Sylvester Omoruyi from 2022, is an Electrical Engineer.

The Webometrics Ranking of World Universities ranked Edo State Polytechnic as second best polytechnic and the 54th best tertiary institution in Nigeria in 2017.

The school had its first convocation ceremony in November, 2018 after over 16 years of existence.

In the school environment they have a Computer Center and Institute Digital Com crystal solution and iUni Crystal Global owned by Femi Praise Moyin.

== Schools ==
- Applied Sciences
  - Computer Science
  - Food Science Technology
  - Statistics
  - Science Laboratory Technology
  - Pharmaceutical Technology
  - Agricultural Technology
  - Library and Information Science
- Business Studies
  - Accounting
  - Business Administration
  - Banking and Finance
  - Marketing
  - Public Administration
  - Office Technology and Management
  - Mass Communication
- Engineering
  - Civil Engineering
  - Chemical Engineering
  - Electrical/Electronics Engineering
  - Mineral and Petroleum Resources Engineering
  - Production Engineering
  - Mechanical Engineering
  - Wielding and fabrication engineering
- Environmental Studies
  - Estate Management
  - Building Technology
  - Urban and Regional Planning
  - Surveying and Geo-informatics

== See also ==
- List of polytechnics in Nigeria
- Education in Nigeria
