= Abiodun Falodun =

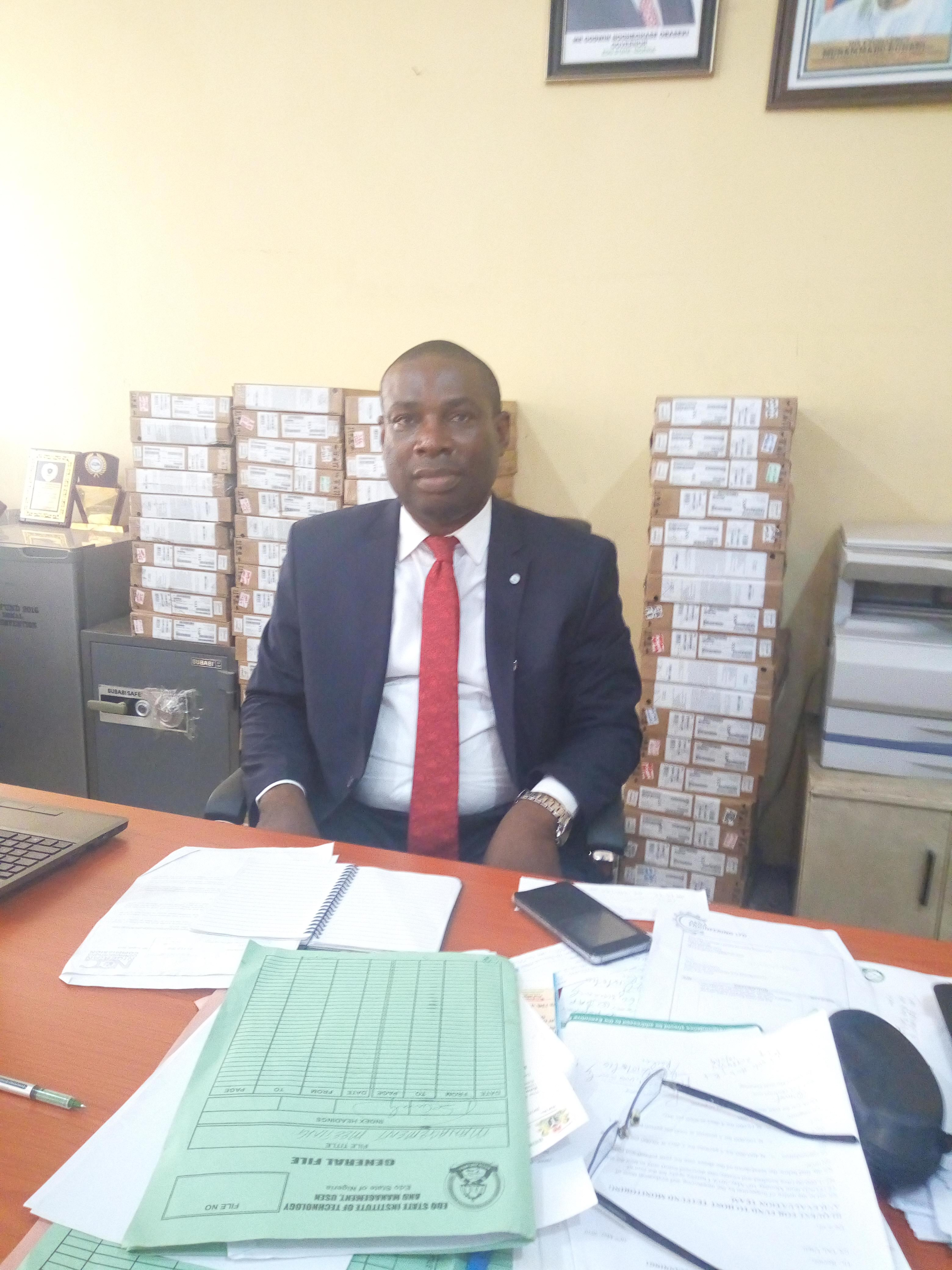
- Falodun in his office at the Federal Polytechnic Usen
- Born: Nigeria
- Education: Bachelor of Pharmacy (1996) Masters in Pharmaceutical Chemistry (2003) PhD in Pharmaceutical Chemistry (2007) from the University of Benin
- Occupations: Researcher. Former Deputy Vice Chancellor of the University of Benin. Rector - Edo State Polytechnic, Usen
- Known for: Research works, reviews and books
- Spouse: Ehizogie Joyce Falodun
- Children: 4
- Awards: Fulbright Scholar at the University of Mississippi, May & Baker Professional Service Award in Pharmaceutical Sciences

Abiodun Falodun is a professor of pharmaceutical chemistry from Nigeria. He was the Deputy Vice Chancellor (Academics) of the University of Benin and currently the Rector of Edo State Polytechnic, Usen. He was appointed by the Governor of Edo state, Godwin Obaseki and sworn in on April 4, 2018.

== Education ==
Falodun holds a bachelor's degree in pharmacy from the University of Benin (1996). He received his master's degree in 2003 and his PhD in pharmaceutical chemistry from the University of Benin in 2007.

== Career ==
Falodun started off as an assistant lecturer in 1999 at the Department of Pharmacy, University of Benin. He was an associate professor in 2011 and was awarded professor of Pharmaceutical Chemistry in 2014.

He was Head of Department of Pharmaceutical Chemistry at the University of Benin. He is a member of the Pharmaceutical Society of Nigeria, Institute of Public Analysts of Nigeria, Phytochemical Society of Europe, Swiss Chemical Society, and American Chemical Society.

He is a member of the Natural Product Research Group (NPRG) research group involved in bioactivity guided isolation, characterization, structure determination and optimization through synthesis of compounds from natural products mostly of plant origin.

He has written and published several research works, journals, reviews and books.

He is the Editor-in-Chief for Tropical Journal of Natural Product Research.

He is currently the pioneer coordinator, Center for Distance Learning at the University of Benin. He was also appointed as Director for Benson Idahosa University Distance Learning School (BIU-DLS).

Falodun was the Deputy Vice Chancellor (Academics) serving with Vice Chancellor F. F. O. Orumwense at the University of Benin.

He was the Rector of Edo State Polytechnic, Usen from 2018 to 2022.

== Awards ==
- May and Baker Professional Service Award 2007
- Fulbright Senior Scholar, Faculty of Pharmacy, University of Mississippi, USA, 2013-2014
- Africa-US Network Centers of Excellence in Water and Environmental Science and Technology (2011 - 2015)

== Personal life ==
Falodun is married to Ehizogie Joyce Falodun with four children.
