= Queen Blessing Ebigieson =

Nigerian actress

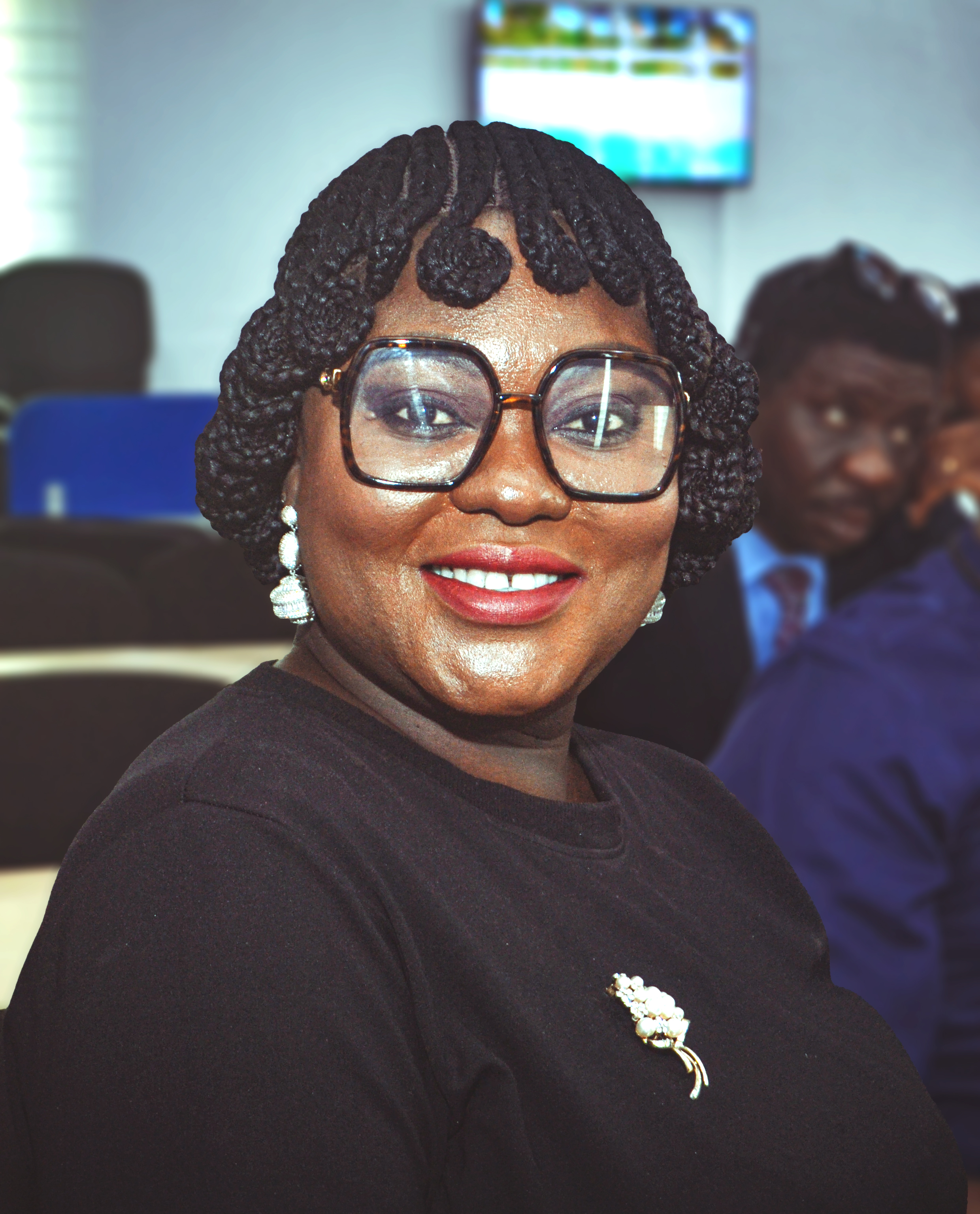
- Queen Blessing Ebigieson at "Wikipedia Essentials: Nollywood edition" workshop
- Born: 14 April 1980 (age 46); Benue State
- Other name: Black Queen
- Occupations: Actress, filmmaker
- Years active: 2000–present
- Children: 1
- Website: www.queenebigieson.com

Queen Blessing Ebigieson (born 14 April 1980) is a Nigerian actress, movie producer, TV host and filmmaker. She won the Best Actress (Indigenous) award and the Best Film (Indigenous) award for her production of Ileri Ife at the 2016 Eko International Film Festival. She received the Special Recognition Award at the 2021 City People Movie Awards for her contributions to the Nigerian movie industry.

== Early life ==
Queen Blessing Ebigieson is a native of Okpella, Edo State, Nigeria. She was born in Benue State and raised in the Northern part of Nigeria. She attended Federal Polytechnic Bida, where she obtained a degree in Mass communication in 2006. She received honorary doctorate degree in administration (decision-making process) from Rescue Mission Theological University in 2022.

== Career ==
Queen Blessing Ebigieson started her career as a dancer and later went into modelling. She started acting in 2000 as an undergraduate. Her first film is Ashes to Ashes in Enugu State where she acted three scenes in the movie.

She has appeared in movies such as Eldorado, Girls Next Door, Back 2 Back, Empty Coffin and soap operas such as Wale Adenuga's Super Story. Since her rise to fame, she proceeded to act in over 80 movies. She owns BQ Productions and has Produced up to ten films since 2009 such as Borokini, Ife Otito, Ejomiko, Ileri Ife, Ibaje Mi Dewa, Fix it or Kill it and Hatred.

She runs Queen Blessing Foundation (QBF) and also an National Drug Law Enforcement Agency Celebrity Drug Free Club ambassador. She has been serving as the 8th National President of the Association of Movie Producers (AMP) Nigeria since March 2023 after taking over from Peace Anyiam-Osigwe, following her unfortunate demise.

== Personal life ==
Queen Blessing Ebigieson has a son with John Okosun of Reality Magazine and five adopted daughters. She is a practicing Christian.

== Filmography ==
- Super Story
- Empty Coffin
- Back 2 Back
- Girls Next Door
- Pretty Angels
- Romantic Touch
- Evil Genius
- Ejomiko
- Eldorado
- Sweet Love
- Moment of Joy
- Aje Ni Mope
- Romantic Attraction
- Omo Butty
- Ashes to Ashes (2000)
