= Ignatius Olisemeka =

Nigerian diplomat and politician

Minister of Foreign Affairs
- In office 1998–1999
- Preceded by: Tom Ikimi
- Succeeded by: Sule Lamido

Personal details
- Born: 12 March 1932 (age 94) Kaduna, Nigeria
- Parent: Oba Nduka Olisemeka (father)

Ignatius Chukuemeka Olisemeka (born 12 March 1932) is a career Nigerian diplomat who served as foreign minister of Nigeria.

He was born in Kaduna on 13 March 1932 as the son of Oba Nduka Olisemeka. From 1976 to 1981 he was ambassador to Madrid with concurrent accreditation to the Holy See. From 1984 to 1987 he was ambassador to Washington, D.C., and High Commissioner to Ottawa. From 1993 to 1998 he was ambassador to Tel Aviv.

Political offices
Preceded by Tom Ikimi	Foreign Minister of Nigeria; 1998 – 1999	Succeeded by Sule Lamido
