= College of Education, Igueben =

State owned government tertiary institution in Igueben, Nigeria

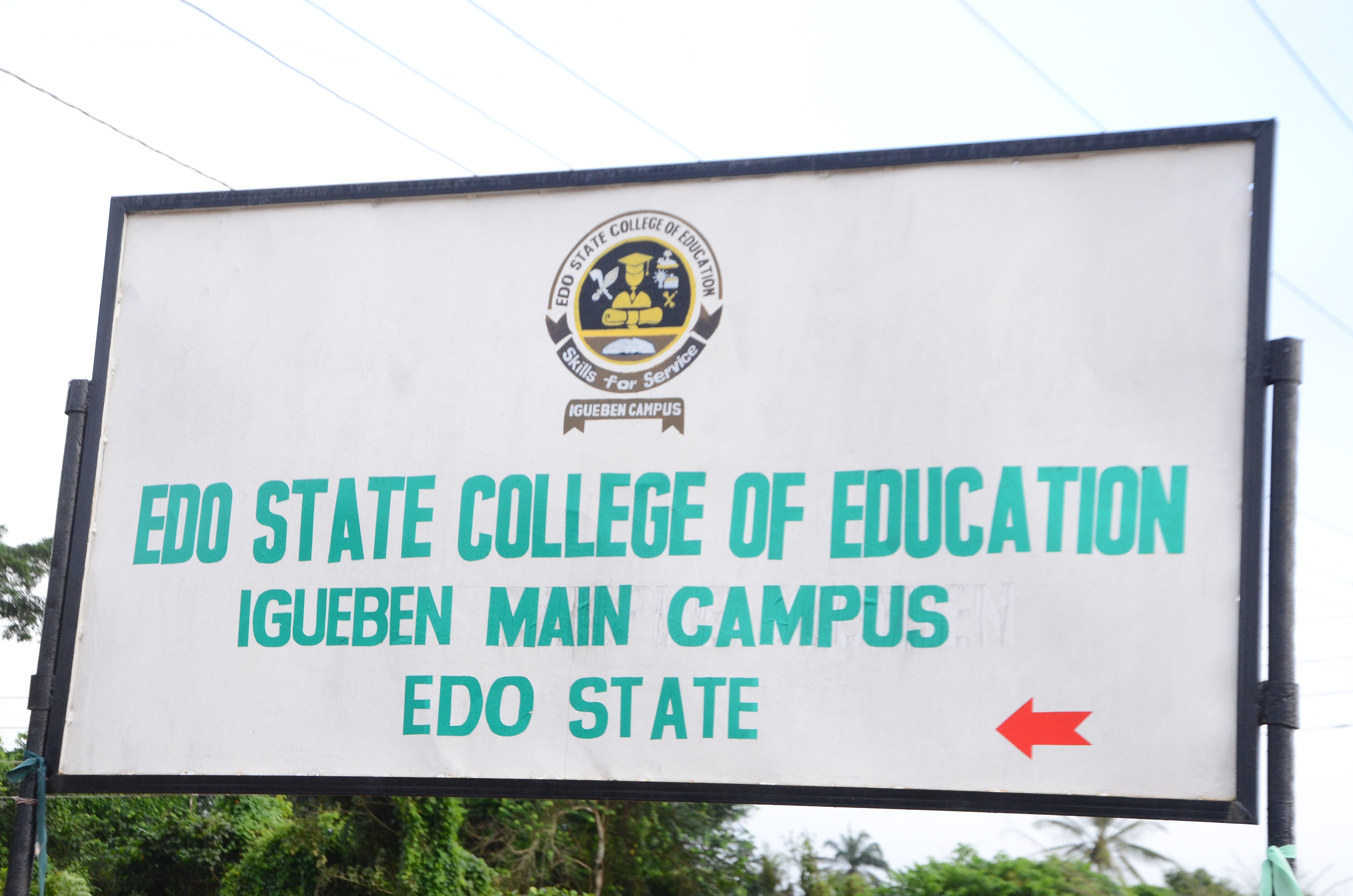

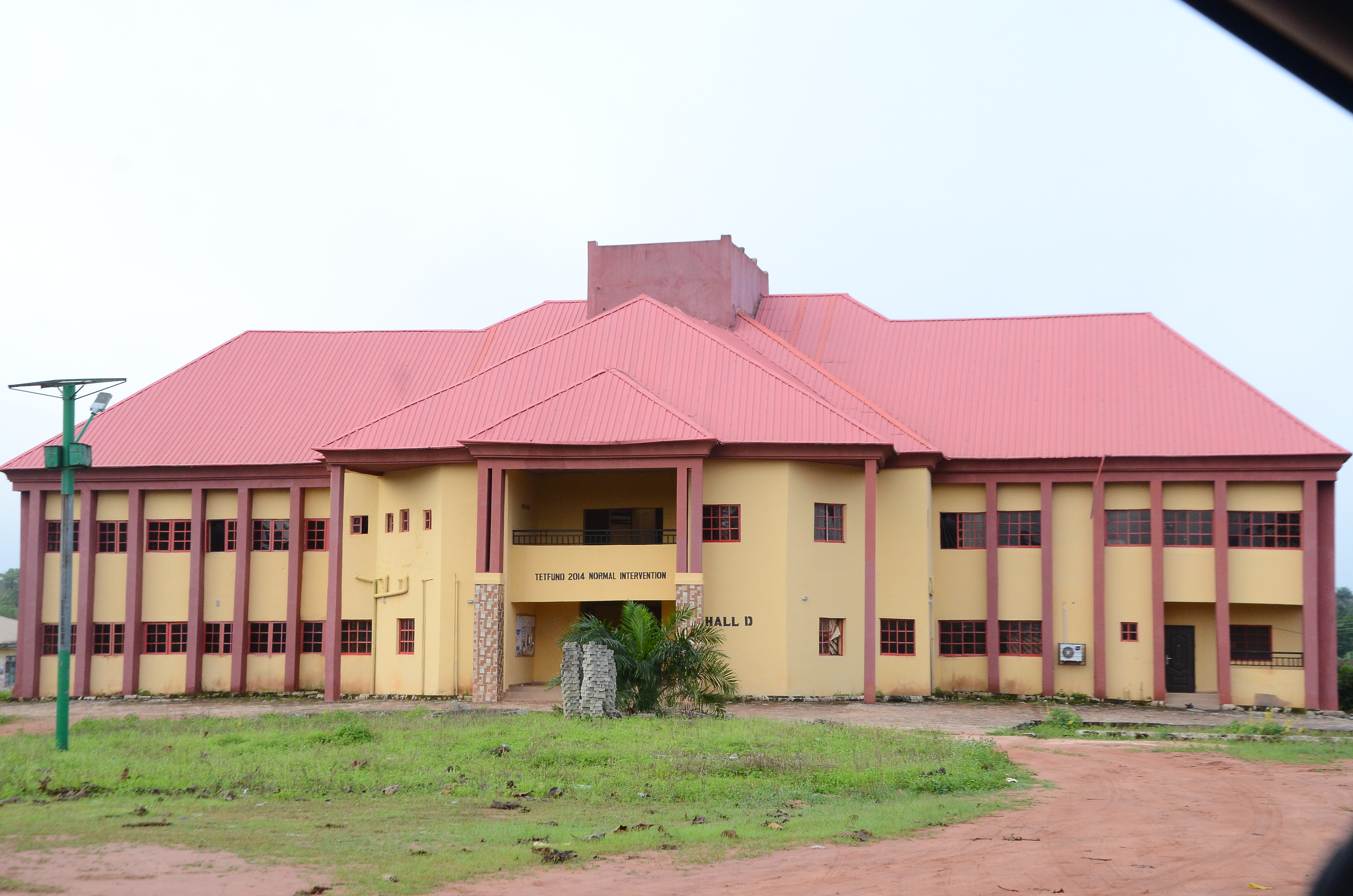

College of Education, Igueben is a state owned government tertiary institution located in Igueben Local Government Area of Edo State, Southern part of Nigeria. The institution was established in 1980 by the Governor of the defunct Bendel State, Professor Ambrose Folorunsho Alli. The college is one of the several government approved tertiary institutions located in Edo Central Senatorial district in Edo State. The institution is accredited by National Universities Commission (NUC). The institution was established with the goal of training educators in Nigeria. Graduates of the institution are awarded the National Certificates in Education (NCE).

== Courses ==
- Agricultural Science
- Biology / Chemistry
- Chemistry / Integrated Science
- Business Education
- Biology / Integrated Science
- Chemistry / Mathematics
- Chemistry / Physics
- Computer Education /Physics
- Computer Education /Accounting
- Computer Science / Secretariat Study
- Computer Science Education / Mathematics
- Economics / Mathematics
- Economics / Social Studies
- English /Political Science
- English / Social Studies
- Geography / Social Studies
- Integrated Science / Mathematics Education
- Integrated Science /Physics
- Physical and Health Education
- Political Science / Social Studies
- Theatre Art
- Primary Education Studies

== Closure and re-opening ==
The College of Education, Igueben, was closed down during the military government era in 1984. The institution was however reopened in 2006 under the administration of Chief (Dr.) Lucky Igbinedion, the then Governor of Edo State.

== Campus structure ==
In 2020, the government of Edo State, under the leadership of the state governor, Mr. Godwin Obaseki, transformed the individual Colleges of Education in the state (College of Education Ekiadolor and College of Education Abudu) to one central college of education called Edo State College of Education. The College of Education, Igueben was made a campus of the state college of Education.
