= Jolly Ehigiator Oyekpen =

Anglican bishop in Nigeria

Jolly Ehigiator Oyekpen was an Anglican bishop in Nigeria.

Oyekpen was born in Iruekpen, Edo State on the 7th of September 1966 and educated at Obafemi Awolowo University. He was Bishop of Akoko-Edo until 2022. He died on the 29th of August 2022 at the University of Benin Teaching Hospital.
