= Mudiame University =

Private research institution in Edo, Nigeria

Mudiame University, Irrua
- Type: Private
- Established: 2021
- Location: Irrua, Nigeria; 6°43′44″N 6°12′45″E
- Campus: Urban
- Website: www.mudiameuniversity.edu.ng

Mudiame University, Irrua is a private institution located in Irrua, Edo State, Nigeria.

== History ==
The university was founded by Professor Sunny Eromosele Eboh, CEO of Mudiame International Limited and Mudiame Welding Institute.

In 2021, Mudiame University was granted license by the Federal Executive Council to commenced academic programmes.

One of Mudiame University’s notable achievements was securing second place nationally in technology and innovation on aqua-diesel production which can result in the reduction of diesel prices in 2023

Mudiame University produced its first set of graduates from the 2021/2022 academic session in 2025.

== Academic programs and sports ==
Mudiame University comprises four main academic divisions: the College of Medicine, the School of Basic Medical Sciences, the School of Engineering and Technology, and the School of Science and Information Technology, as well as the School of Entrepreneurship and Management Sciences. The university also features various sporting facilities, including a basketball court, tennis court, and football field, which are used for student recreational and athletic activities.

The National University Commission, NUC, have accredited the University programmes. The following courses are currently available for study at university:

College of Medicine

- MBBS Medicine and Surgery

Faculty of Basic Medical Sciences

- B.Sc Nursing
- B.Sc Medical Laboratory Sciences
- B.Sc Public Health
- B.Sc Human Nutrition & Dietetics

School of Engineering and Technology

- B.Sc Civil Engineering
- B.Sc Mechanical Engineering
- B.Sc Electrical and Electronic Engineering
- B.Sc Computer Engineering
- B.Sc Materials and Metallurgical Engineering

Faculty of Science and Information Technology

- B.Sc Mathematics
- B.Sc Software Engineering
- B.Sc Physics with Electronics
- B.Sc Chemistry
- B.Sc Computer Science
- B.Sc Biochemistry
- B.Sc Food Science and Technology

Faculty of Entrepreneurship and Management Sciences

- B.Sc Accounting
- B.Sc Economics
- B.Sc Entrepreneurship
- B.Sc Business Administration
- B.Sc Mass Communication
- B.Sc Criminology and Security Studies
