= Edo traditional food =

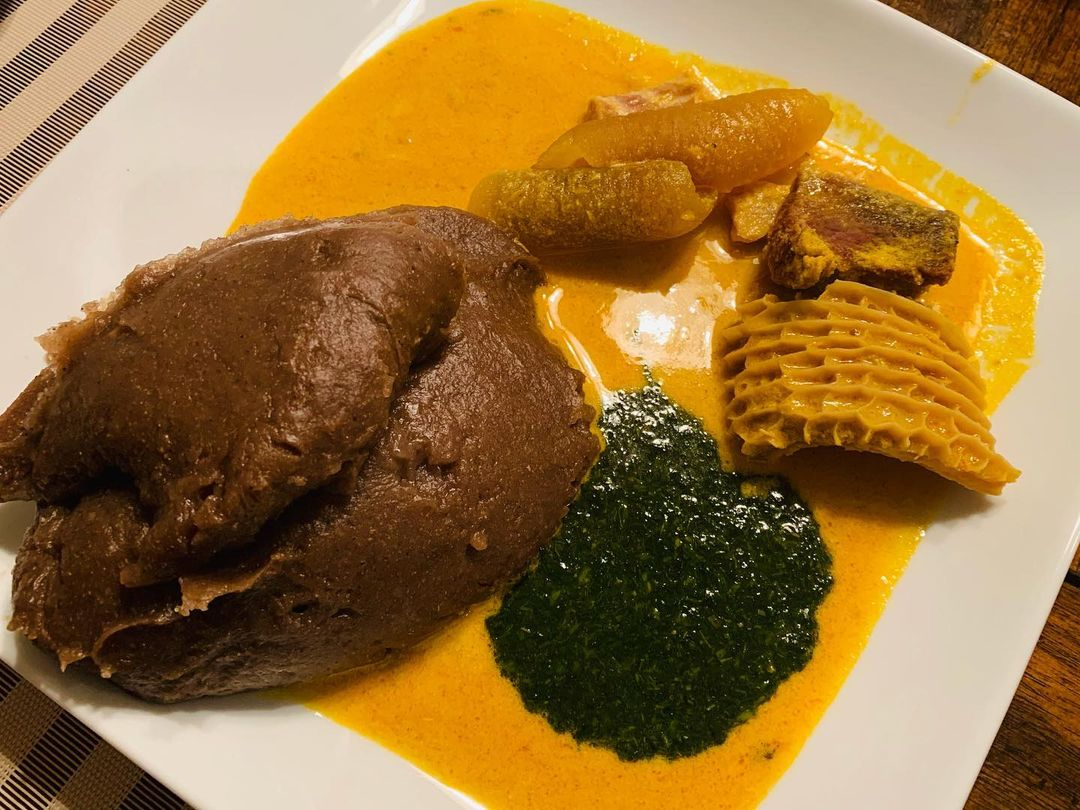
Swallow

Edo traditional food consists of dishes and food items common among the people of Edo State. The state is home to various ethnic groups, including the Binis (or Edos), Ishan (Esan), Afemai, Etsako, Uzebba Iuleha people (Owan) and others. Traditional foods among these groups commonly include soups served with swallows. Swallow is a term for Nigerian meals that are typically eaten with soup and swallowed without chewing, although some people chew them before swallowing.

== Soups ==
While swallows are common among most ethnic groups in Nigeria, the soups are often unique to different ethnic groups. The following are some of the traditional soups and dishes associated with the Edo people.

Bini owo soup

Bini owo soup is a soup eaten by the Edo people. It differs in its ingredients and preparation from owo (or Owho), a soup associated with the Urhobo people of southern Nigeria. It is prepared with palm oil, smoked fish, and potash (okawu or kan), which is used as a thickening agent. It is usually served with yam, cocoyam, or unripe plantain.

Groundnut soup

Groundnut soup is associated with the Etsako and Owan people of Edo State. It is locally called ‘‘omisagwe’’ among the Etsako. It is prepared using groundnuts (peanuts), tomatoes, onions, and a variety of meats, such as chicken, beef, or chevon. The soup is usually served with fufu, pounded yam, garri (eba), or starch.

Corn soup

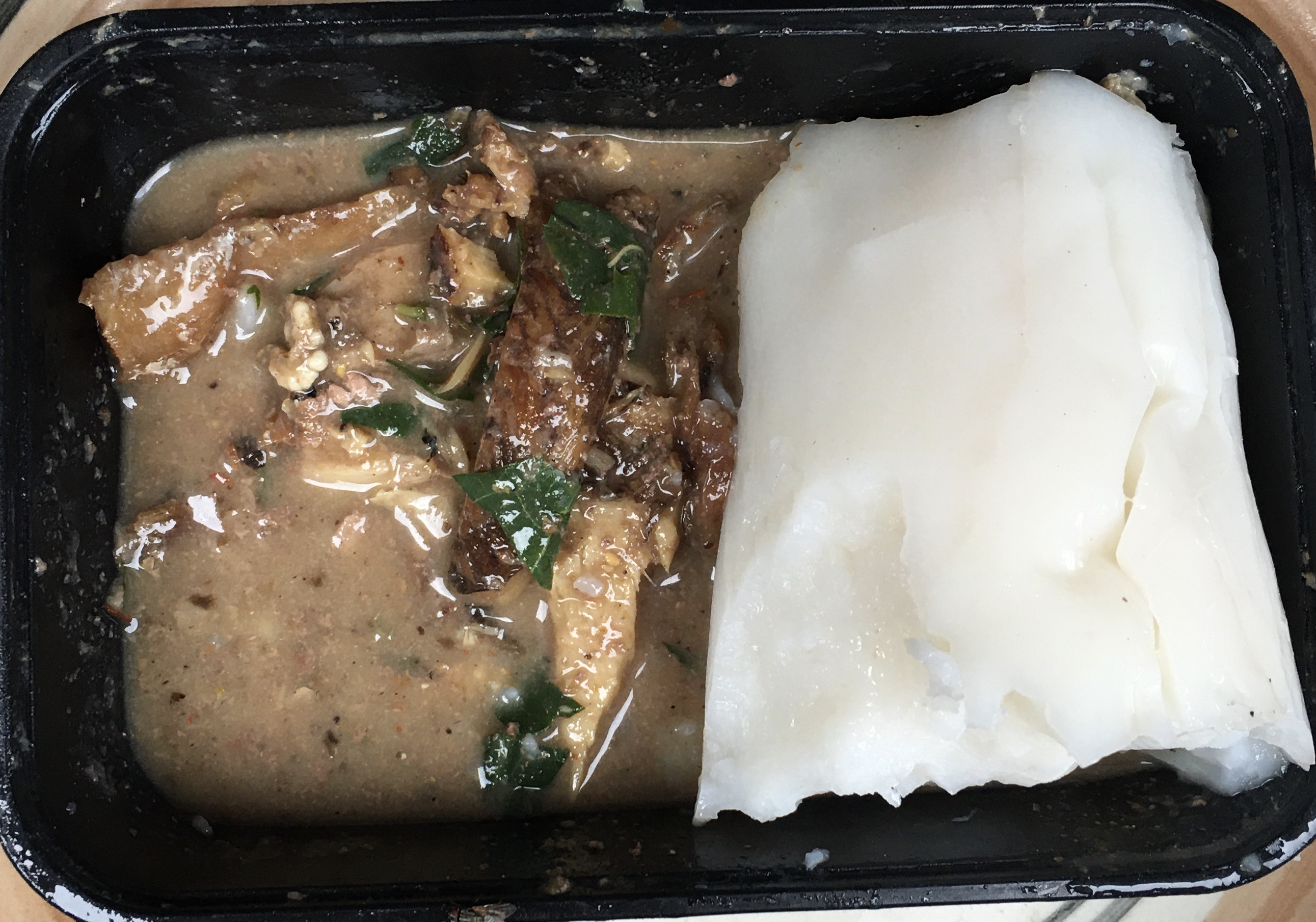
Corn meal

Corn soup is a traditional soup of the Afemai people of Edo State. It is locally called ‘‘omi ukpoka’’. It is prepared using corn, smoked fish, and leafy vegetables. It is usually served with swallows such as fufu, eba, or pounded yam.

Black soup

Black soup is particularly common among the Ishan (Esan) and Owan people. In Esan and Owan, it is known as ‘‘omoebe’’ (“leaf soup”). The soup is prepared using bitter leaf and other vegetables, including scent leaf (ebau mokho in the Edo language). The combination of these vegetables gives the soup its characteristic dark colour. It is usually served with semo, pounded yam, eba, or fufu.

Ogbono

Ogbono soup is a traditional soup associated with the Edo people, particularly the Esan. The nuts of the African bush mango (Irvingia spp.) are used to prepare the soup. The nuts are valued among the Esan people and elsewhere in Edo State and are used to prepare ogbono soup. It is commonly served with pounded yam and other swallows.

== See also ==
- West African cuisine
- List of African cuisines
