= Edo State =

State of Nigeria

Edo
- State
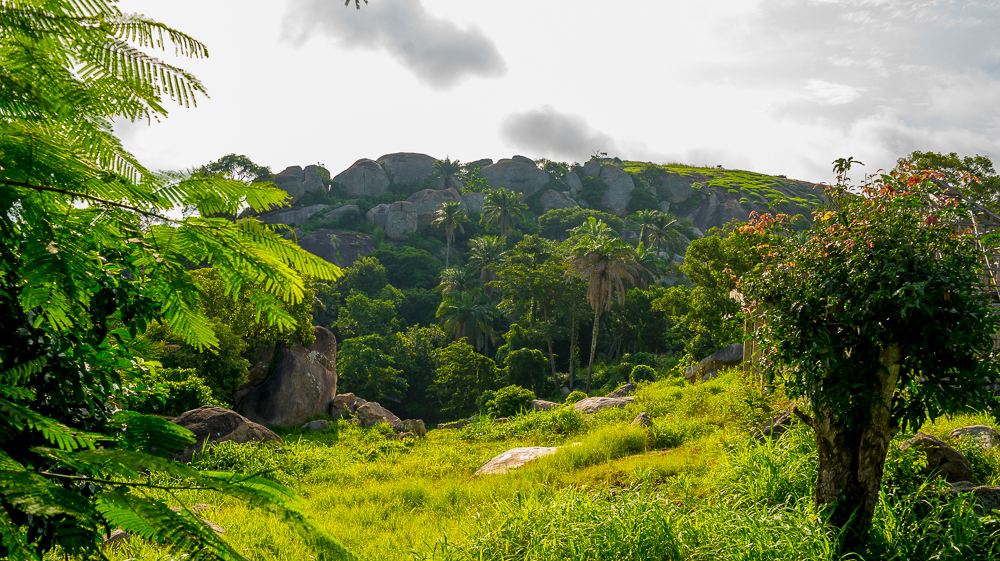
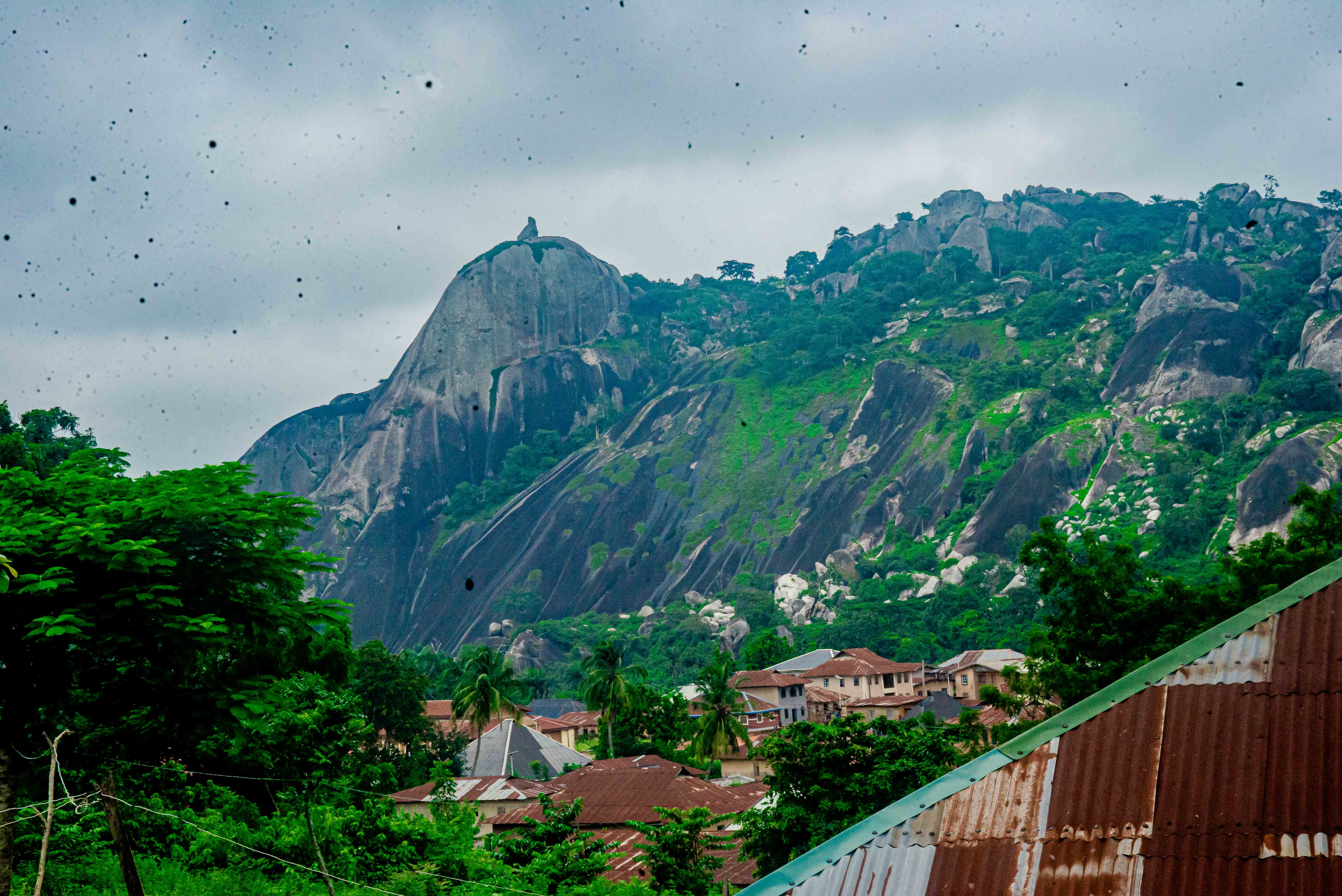
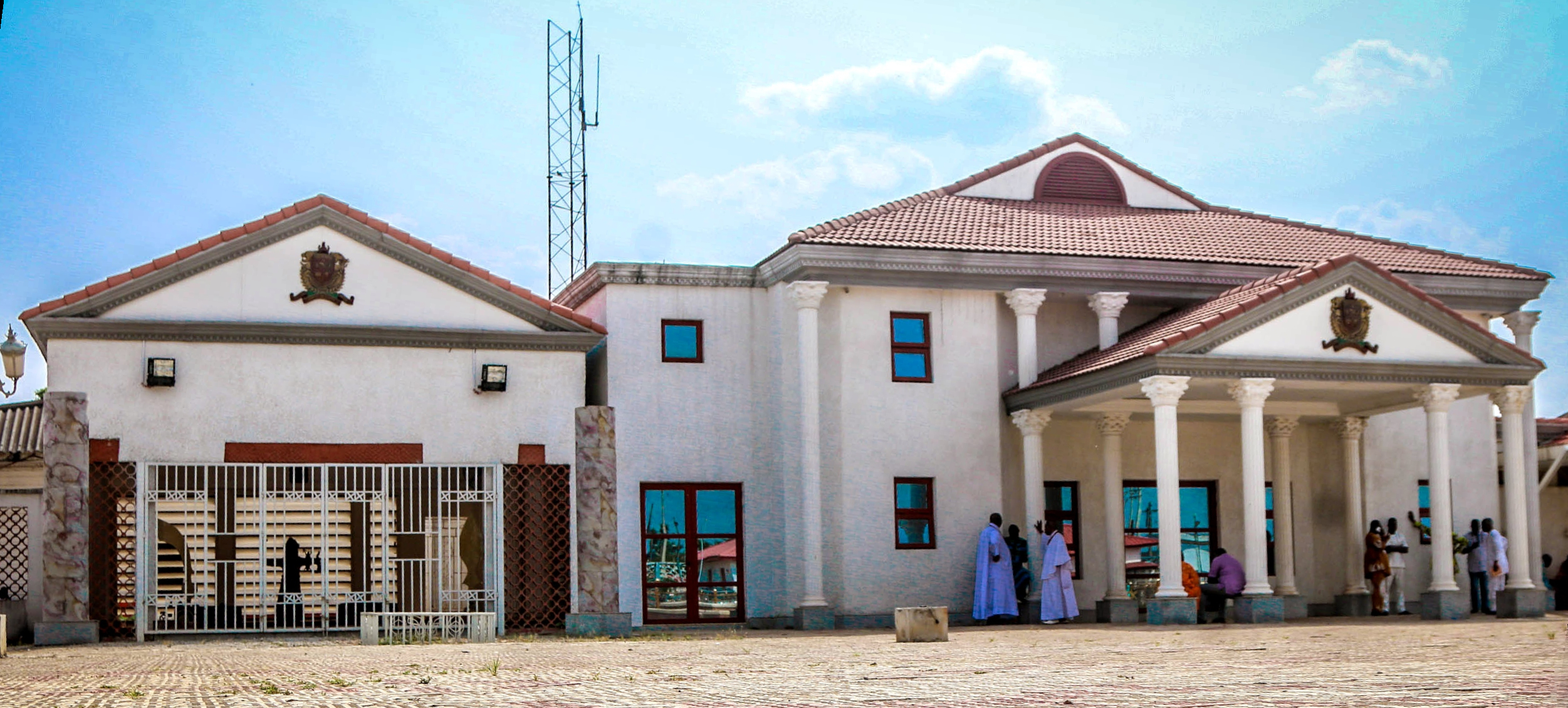
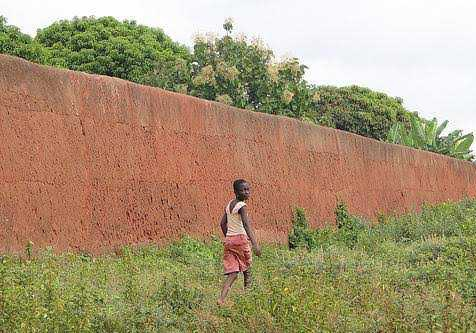
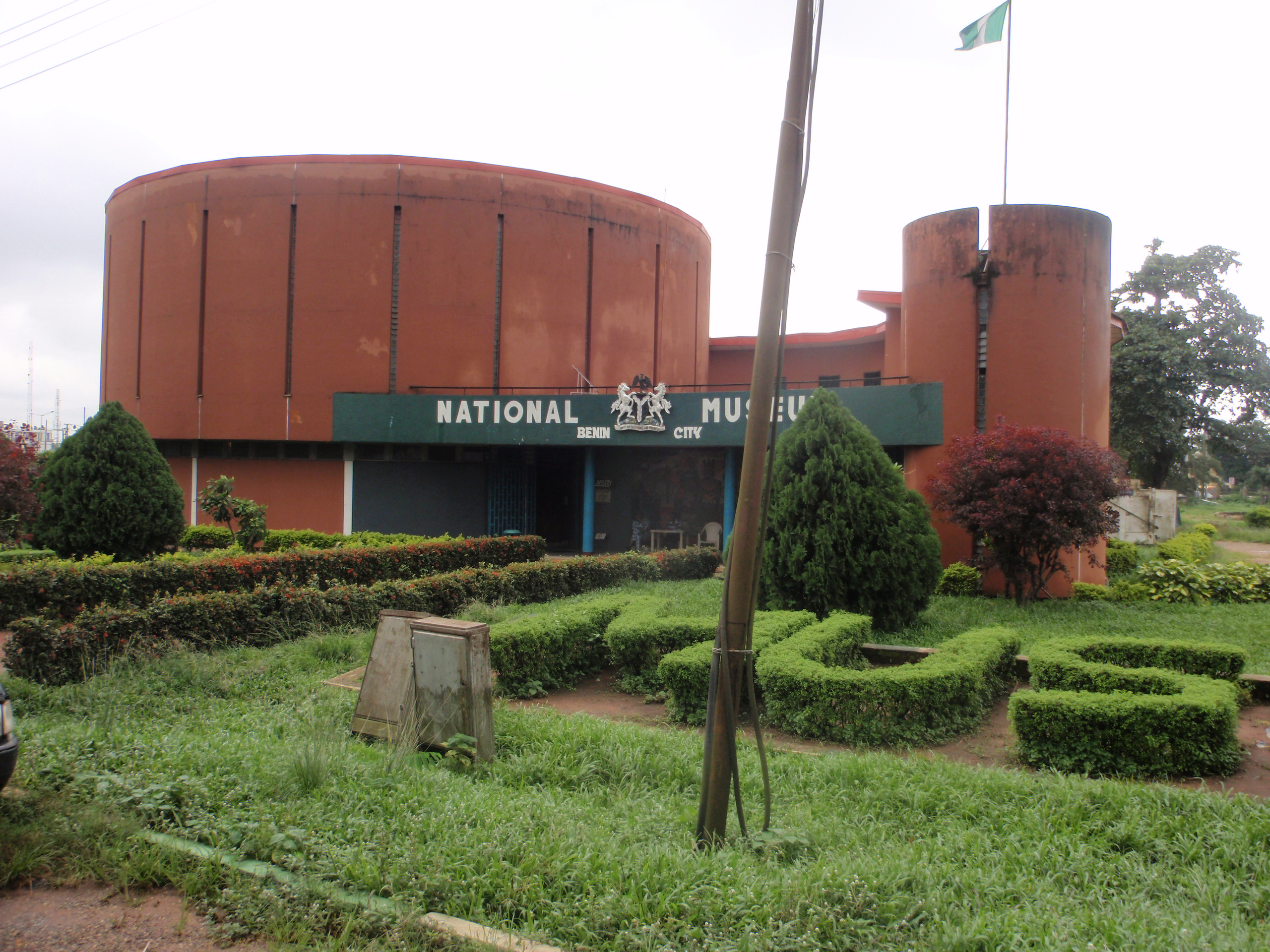
- Ososo Hills Somorika Hills Palace of the Oba of Benin Benin Moat Benin City National Museum

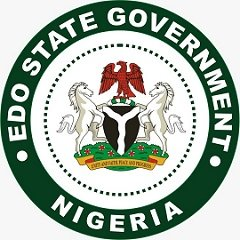
- Flag Seal
- Nicknames: Heartbeat of Nigeria
- Location of Edo State in Nigeria
- Coordinates: 6°30′N 6°00′E
- Country: Nigeria
- LGAs: 18
- Date created: 27 August 1991
- Capital and largest city: Benin City

Government
  - Body: Government of Edo State
  - Governor (List): Monday Okpebholo (APC)
  - Deputy Governor: Dennis Idahosa (APC)
  - Legislature: Edo State House of Assembly
  - Senators: C: Joseph Ikpea (APC); N: Adams Oshiomhole (APC); S: Neda Imasuen (APC)
  - Representatives: List

Area
  - Total: 19,559 km^{2} (7,552 sq mi)
  - Rank: 21st of 36

Population
  - Estimate (2024): 5,250,000
  - Rank: 20th of 36
  - Density: 270/km^{2} (700/sq mi)
- Demonym: Edos

GDP (PPP)
  - Year: 2021
  - Total: $30.81 billion 15th of 36
  - Per capita: $5,325; 10th of 36
- Time zone: UTC+01 (WAT)
- postal code: 300001
- ISO 3166 code: NG-ED
- HDI (2022): 0.633 medium · 8th of 37
- Website: www.edostate.gov.ng

Edo is a state in Nigeria located in the South-South geopolitical zone of Nigeria. As of 2024, the state was ranked as the 20th most populous state (5,250,000) in Nigeria. In 2021, the projected population was approximately 4,777,000. Edo State is the 21st largest state by landmass in Nigeria. The state's capital, Benin City, is the fourth largest city in Nigeria and the centre of the country's rubber industry. Created in 1991 from the former Bendel State, it is also known as the heartbeat of the nation. Edo State borders Kogi State to the north for 133 km and across the Niger River for 81 km to the northeast, Anambra State to the east for about four km across the Niger River, Delta State to the southeast and south for 350 km (218 miles), and Ondo State to the west.

The modern borders of Edo State encompass regions that were formerly the site of various empires and kingdoms of the second dynasty formed in the 11th century AD, the Benin Empire. The ancient city of Edo, the site of modern-day Benin City, was home to some of the largest earthworks in the world. In 1897, the British Empire conducted a punitive expedition and invasion of the region, destroying most of the ancient city of Edo and incorporating the territory into what would become the Southern Nigeria Protectorate.

Edo State is a diverse state that is predominantly inhabited by the Edoid people, including the Edo (or Bini), Esan, Ora, Akoko-Edo, Owan and Afemai people and Igala people among others. The most common Edoid language spoken is the Edo language, which is commonly spoken in Benin City. Christianity is one of the dominant religions in Edo South. It was first introduced to the region by Portuguese missionaries during the 15th century. Islam, on the contrary, is the dominant religion in Edo North and traditional religions are also practised across these Senatorial districts of the State.

== History ==
The Mid-Western Region was a division of Nigeria that came into being in 1963. It was formed in June 1963 from Benin and Delta provinces of the Western Region, and its capital was Benin City. In 1967 when a new 12-state structure was introduced, the region transmuted into Midwest State, remaining territorially intact. This nomenclature lasted until the territory was renamed Bendel state in 1976.

During the Nigerian Civil War, the Biafran forces negotiated for a passage (in agreement for the Independence of Benin kingdom or Republic of Benin) in the new Mid-Western state, en route to Lagos, in an attempt to force a quick end to the war. While under Biafran occupation, the state was declared as the "Republic of Benin" as Nigerian forces were to retake the region. The republic collapsed a day after the declaration as Nigerian troops overtook Benin City. Edo State was established on 27 August 1991 when Bendel State was split into Edo and Delta States. The traditional political organization of the Edo people is expressed in a three-tier age group system that cuts across kin groups and make age, rather than line-age affiliation, with criterion of authority. Benin city itself is organized on the basis of age-grades similar to those of the villages as well as on the basis of wards and chiefs, both hereditary and non-hereditary, serving the Oba in specialised functions. The Oba is the focal point of the Benin political system and institution is based squarely on that of divine kingship.

== Geography ==
=== Climate ===
Edo state has a tropical wet and dry or savanna climate with yearly temperature of 28.78 °C (83.8 °F) and it is -0.68% lower than Nigeria's averages. Edo typically receives about 183.49 millimetres (7.22 inches) of precipitation and has 265.91 rainy days (72.85% of the time) annually and at an elevation of 239.16 metres (784.6 ft) above sea level.

== People ==
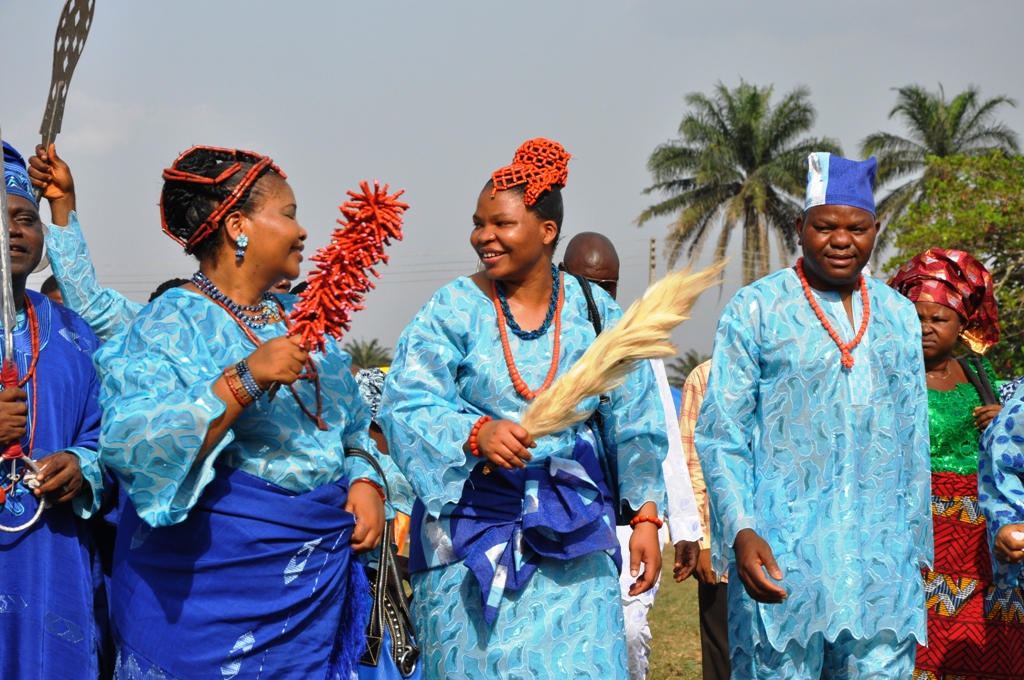
Burial in Edo State

With Benin City as capital, the population of the entire state is approximately 5 million. It is made up of four major ethnic groups; namely Edo (Binis), Owan, Esan and Afemai (Etsako & Akoko Edo). However, the State has a high presence of residents from across the country and the world because of its cosmopolitan tendencies. Benin City has a history of being one of the foremost destinations of Europeans during their exploration of Africa continent many centuries ago. Some of these flash points have remained enviable tourists' attraction sites for the state. The people are known for having several Edo traditional food.

=== Demographics ===
The main ethnic groups in Edo State are Édo, Etsako, Esan, Owan, and Akoko Edo. Some of the groups can trace their origin to Benin City, hence their dialects vary with their distance from Benin City. The Edo speaking people occupy seven out of the 18 Local Government Areas (LGAs) of the state and constitute 57.54% of the total population. Others are as follows: Esan (14.14%), Igala in Esan South East LGA 3%, Etsako (12.19%), Owan (7.43%), Ijaw (6%) and Akoko Edo (5.70%). There are also Igarra speaking communities in Akoko Edo, Itsekiri communities in Ikpoba-Okha, and Ijaw Izons and Urhobos in Ovia North East and South West Local Government Areas, especially in the borderlands. Also, Ika speaking communities exist in Igbanke (Ika) in Orhionmwon LGA.

== Governors ==
Name	Title	Took office	Left office	Party	Notes
Colonel John Ewerekumoh Yeri	Governor	August 1990	January 1992	(Military)
John E.K. Odigie Oyegun	Governor	January 1992	November 1993	SDP
Colonel Mohammed Abul-Salam Onuka	Administrator	9 December 1993	14 September 1994	(Military)
Colonel Bassey Asuquo	Administrator	14 September 1994	22 August 1996	(Military)
Group Captain Baba Adamu Iyam	Administrator	22 August 1996	7 August 1998	(Military)
Navy Captain Anthony Onyearugbulem	Administrator	7 August 1998	29 May 1999	(Military)
Chief Lucky Igbinedion	Governor	29 May 1999	29 May 2007	PDP
Professor Oserheimen Osunbor	Governor	29 May 2007	12 November 2008	PDP	Removed by court judgment invalidating his election
Comrade Adams A. Oshiomhole	Governor	12 November 2008	12 November 2016	AC which later merged with some other political parties to become APC (All Progressive Congress) in 2013
Godwin Obaseki	Governor	12 November 2016	12 November 2024	APC then decamped to the PDP on 19 June 2020 to seek re-election	Reelected 20 September 2020.
Monday Okpebholo	Governor	12 November 2024	Present	APC

== Local government areas ==
Edo State consists of eighteen (18) local government areas. They are:

- Akoko-Edo
- Egor
- Esan Central
- Esan North-East
- Esan South-East
- Esan West
- Etsako Central
- Etsako East
- Etsako West
- Igueben
- Ikpoba-Okha
- Oredo
- Orhionmwon
- Ovia North-East
- Ovia South-West
- Owan East
- Owan West
- Uhunmwonde

== Edo State House of Assembly (Fifth Assembly) Division List, 2023 ==
Edo State House of Assembly Division List 2023, consists of twenty-four (24) divisions:

- Akoko-Edo 1
- Ovia South-West
- Orhionmwon I
- Etsako East
- Uhunmwonde
- Esan South-East
- Esan Central
- Esan West
- Igueben
- Oredo West
- Esan North-East I
- Ikpoba-Okha
- Etsako West I
- Owan East
- Orhionmwon II
- Etsako Central
- Owan West
- Egor
- Esan North-East II
- Akoko-Edo II
- Ovia North-East II
- Oredo East
- Ovia North-East I
- Etsako West II

== Edo State Judiciary ==
The Judiciary is the third arm of Government in the State, vested with the power to interpret the laws and resolve disputes in both civil and criminal matters in the State. The State Judiciary is headed by a Chief Judge. On 19 May 2023, Former Edo State Governor, Godwin Obaseki swore in Hon. Justice Daniel Iyobosa Okungbowa as Acting Chief Judge of Edo State, following the retirement of Justice Joe Acha.

== Politics ==
Monday Okpebholo is the current governor of Edo State and was sworn into office on 12 November 2024. His deputy is Dennis Idahosa. The Edo State House of Assembly is the legislative body. After the 2023 elections, the 24-member assembly consisted of fifteen representatives of the centre-right People's Democratic Party, eight members of the centre All Progressives Congress and one member of the centre-left Labour Party.

=== Electoral system ===
The electoral system of each state is selected using a modified two-round system. To be elected in the first round, a candidate must receive the plurality of the vote and over 25% of the vote in at least two -third of the State local government Areas. If no candidate passes threshold, a second round will be held between the top candidate and the next candidate to have received a plurality of votes in the highest number of local government Areas.

== Languages ==
English is the official language of the state. The major tribal languages spoken in the state are Edo, Etuno, Etsako, Esan, Ake-Ievbu and Okpamheri. Edo State is home to several ethnicities, they are the Edo, Esan, Afenmai, Akoko, Igbanke, Emai.

The Etsako/Afemai people of Edo state have the highest population of Muslims. They live in three local government areas within the state and their major occupation is farming.

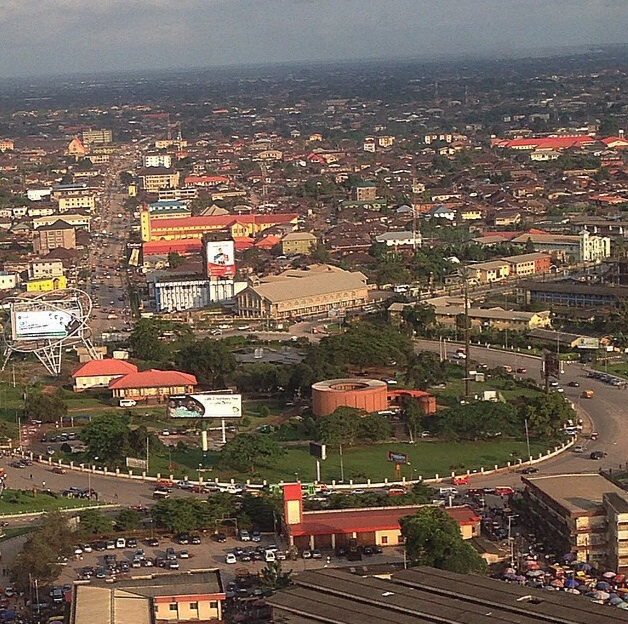
Areal view of the ancient city of Benin

Languages of Edo State listed by LGA:

LGA	Languages
Akoko-Edo	Aduge; Akuku; Etuno; Enwan; Igwe; Ikpeshi; Ivbie North-Okpela-Arhe; Okpamheri; Okpe; Oloma; Ososo; Sasaru; Ukaan; Uneme; Yoruba
Esan Central	Esan
Esan North East	Esan
Esan South East	Esan
Esan West	Esan
Etsako	Etsako; Ivbie North-Okpela-Arhe; Uneme
Etsako Central	Etsako
Etsako East	Etsako
Etsako West	Etsako
Igueben	Esan/Edo, Ika
Ikpoba-Okha	Edo
Oredo	Edo
Orhionmwon	Edo, Ika
Ovia North East	Edo, Yoruba
Ovia South West	Edo, Yoruba
Owan East	Emai-Iuleha-Ora; Ghotuo; Idesa; Ihievbe
Owan West	Emai - Iuleha, Ora
Uhunmwonde	Edo

== Religion ==
The people of Edo state are predominantly Christians and Muslims faithful, although a minority of the population adhere to indigenous religions.

The Catholic Church comprises the Archdiocese of Benin City (1884 as Upper Niger) with 84 parishes under Archbishop Augustine Obiora Akubeze (2011) and three suffragan dioceses of Auchi(2002) with 56 parishes under Bishop Gabriel Ghiakhomo Dunia(2002), Issele-Uku(1973) with 94 parishes under Bishop Michael Odogwu Elue(2003), and Uromi (2005) with 18 parishes under Bishop Donatus Aihmiosion Ogun (2014).

The Anglican Province of Bendel (2002) in the Church of Nigeria under Archbishop Cyril Odutemu (2020) includes the Diocese of Akoko-Edo (2007) led by Bishop Jolly Ehigiator Oyekpen until he died 2022, the Diocese of Benin (1962) led by Bishop Peter Imasuen (2004), the Diocese of Esan (2000) led by Bishop Gabriel Elabor (2020), the Diocese of Etsako (2007) led by Bishop Felix Unuokhe Olorunfemi, the Diocese of Oleh (1999) led by Bishop John Usiwoma Aruakpor (2012), and the Diocese of Sabongidda-Ora (1993) led by Bishop Augustine Ohilebo (2004).

== Economy ==
Tourist attractions in Edo State include the Emotan Statue in Benin City, Ise Lake and River Niger Beach in Agenebode, Etsako-East; Mike Akhigbe Square at Fugar, Ambrose Alli Square, Ekpoma, River Niger Beaches at Ilushi, BFFM Building at Ewu, Obiemen lake in Agua Irrua, Igun Bronze Caster at Igun Street in Benin City, College of Agriculture and Aqua Culture Technology, Agenebode, Okpekpe with its hills and scenes and the Usomege Hills at Apana-Uzairue, Somorika hills in Akoko Edo, where a government-run tourist center at Ososo is set among spectacular scenery.

The state produces crude oil, and other mineral resources like limestone and quarry. The state has a cement factory at Okpella and a Flour Mill at Ewu which is moribund.

=== Human trafficking ===
The rate of Human Trafficking in Edo State is in this region of Nigeria. Located in Nigeria's Southern region, Edo State accounts for the highest proportion of irregular migrants in Nigeria. Young girls in Edo state are enticed with false promises to leave Nigeria and travel abroad for a better life, by the traffickers. The traffickers in this state also use manipulation, diabolical oath and debt bondage to control their victims and force them into slavery, forced labour, sex trafficking, and organ sales.

== Mineral resources ==
The following are the mineral resources found in Edo State

- Bitumen
- Clay
- Dolomite
- Phosphate
- Glass-sand
- Gold
- Gypsium
- Iron-ore
- Lignite
- Limestone
- Marble
- Oil/Gas

== Education ==
Notable tertiary learning institutions in Edo state include:

- Ambrose Alli University, Ekpoma
- Auchi Polytechnic
- Benson Idahosa University, Benin City
- College of Agriculture, Iguoriakhi
- Edo State Polytechnic Usen
- College of Education, Ekiadolor
- Edo Technical College
- Edo University, Iyahmo(formerly Edo University, Uzairue)
- Igbinedion University, Okada
- Kings Polytechnic
- Mudiame University, Irrua
- Glorious Vision University, Ogwa
- Shaka Polytechnic
- University of Benin
- Wellspring University

== Healthcare ==
List of Edo State Medical zones and associated local government areas.

Medical Zone	Local Government	Name Of Hospital	Medical Zone	Local Government	Name Of Hospital	Medical Zone	Local Government	Name Of Hospital
Abudu	Orhionmwon	General Hospital, Abudu	Benin	Oredo	Central Hospital B/City	Igarra	Akoko Edo	General Hospital, Igarra
Abudu	Orhionmwon	General Hospital, Igbanke	Benin	Oredo	Cottage. Hospital Obayantor	Igarra	Akoko Edo	Government Hospital, Ibillo
Abudu	Orhionmwon	General Hospital, Uronigbe	Benin	Oredo	Stella Obasanjo Hospital	Etete Layout Road,	Benin City	Dist. Hospital, Uneme-Osu
Abudu	Orhionmwon	Cot. Hospital Oben	Ekpoma	Esan West	General Hospital, Ekpoma	Iguobazuwa	Ovia South West	General Hospital. Iguobazuwa
Abudu	Orhionmwon	Cot. Hospital Egbokor	Ekpoma	Esan West	General Hospital, Iruekpen	Iguobazuwa	Ovia South West	Government Hospital Usen
Abudu	Uhunmwode	Dist. Hospital, Egba	Ekpoma	Esan Central	Dist. Hospital, Usugbenu	Iguobazuwa	Ovia North East	Dist. Hospital, Ekiadolor
Afuze	Owan East	General Hospital, Afuze	Ekpoma	Esan Central	Dist. Hospital, Ewu	Ossiomo	Leprosy Clinic in All L.G.A	Specislist Hospital, Ossiomo
Afuze	Owan East	Dist. Hospital, Otuo	Fugar	Etsako East	General Hospital, Fugar	Ubiaja	Esan South West	General Hospital, Ubiaja
Afuze	Owan West	General Hospital, Sabogida Ora	Fugar	Etsako East	General Hospital, Agenebode	Ubiaja	Esan South West	Dist. Hospital, Ewohimi
Afuze	Owan West	Dist. Hospital, Uzebba	Fugar	Etsako East	Dist. Hospital, Apana	Ubiaja	Igueben	Government Hospital, Igueben
Auchi	Estako West	Central. Hospital, Auchi	Fugar	Etsako West	Government Hospital, Agbede	Uromi	Esan North East	Central Hospital Uromi

== Transport ==
Federal Highways are

- A2 north from Warri to Delta State via Benin City to Okene in Kogi State,
- A121 (part of TAH8: Trans-African Highway 8 Lagos-Mombasa) west from A2 in Benin City via Okokpon and Ugbogui to Ondo State at Ofosu,
- A122 north from Benin City via Odighi to Ondo State at Sobe,
- A232 (part of TAH8) east from Benin City via Iguomo, Ugoneki, Ugomoson, Abudu and Ossiomo and Ogan to Agbor (Delta State).

Other major roads include

- the Siuko Rd northwest from Benin City via Ogheghe and Okoro to Okokpon,
- the Ekiadoro-Olumoye-Uhen Rd north from A121 at Ekiadoro to Ondo State at Ogbesse,
- the Auchi-Ekpessa Rd to Federal Rd Uwhosi to Kogi State at Lankpeshi,
- the Auchi-Agenebode Rd east from A2 at Auchi via Ivioghe as the Ayoguri-Agenebode Rd,
- north from Fugar to Kogi State,
- the Uromi Igbanke Rd south to A232 at Agbor to Delta State,
- the Sakpoba Rd northeast from Ugbeka to Agbor in Delta State,
- the Warri-Sakpoba Rd southwest from Otefe to A2 at Ogharefe Junction in Delta State.

Airports: Benin City is served by Benin Airport with flights to Abuja, Kano, Lagos and Port Harcourt.

== Notable people ==
- Oba of Benin
- Elderson Echiéjilé
- Aigboje Aig-Imoukhuede, co-founder of Access Bank Plc and founder of Africa Initiative for Governance (AIG)
- Admiral Mike Akhigbe, former vice president of the Federal Republic of Nigeria.
- Professor Ambrose Alli, former governor of the defunct Bendel State. He created the Bendel State university now named after him.
- Jacob U. Egharevba, Bini historian and traditional chief
- Erhabor Emokpae, pioneer of modern arts in Nigeria
- Chief Anthony Enahoro, anti-colonial and pro-democracy activist and politician
- Dele Giwa, Nigerian journalist, editor and founder of Newswatch magazine.
- Abel Guobadia, educator and former Nigerian ambassador to the Republic of Korea, former Chairman Independent National Electoral Commission (INEC)
- Pa Michael Imoudu, labour leader and founder of the Nigeria state
- Gen. George Agbazika Innih, one-time military governor of Bendel and Kwara State
- Professor Festus Iyayi, novelist and first African to win the Commonwealth Writers Prize
- Maymunah Kadiri, mental health advocate
- Ruth Kadiri, movie producer and actress
- Senator Albert Legogie, former deputy senate president in the defunct Third Republic and a pioneer member of the Board of Trustees of the Peoples Democratic Party (PDP).
- Major-General Abdul Rahman Mamudu former Commander Nigerian Army Signals Corps and military administrator Gongola State
- John Momoh, Nigerian broadcast journalist and CEO of Channels TV
- Kingsley Ehizibue, a professional footballer currently playing for Udinese Calcio
- Prince Tony Momoh, former Minister of Information and Culture
- Godwin Obaseki, former chairman of the State's economic team and Former Governor of the State
- Dr Samuel Ogbemudia, former governor of the midwest region of Nigeria and later Bendel state
- Monday Okpebholo, former Senator representing Edo Central Senatorial District and Present Governor of the State
- Oluwole Omofemi, artist, curator, painter of the last commissioned painting of Queen Elizabeth II before her demise.
- Adams Oshiomhole, past president of the Nigeria Labour Congress and former governor of Edo State
- Professor Osayuki Godwin Oshodin, former vice chancellor of University of Benin
- Pastor Chris Oyakhilome, founder of the Believers Loveworld Nation
- John Odigie Oyegun, First Governor of Edo state and former national chairman of the ruling APC
- Chief Julius Momo Udochi, first Nigerian ambassador to the United States
- Odia Ofeimun, poet and former president of the Association of Nigerian Authors
- General Godwin Abbe, former Nigerian Minister for Interior and Defence
- Archbishop John Edokpolo, founder of Edokpolo Grammar Schools and Political Activist
- Sir Victor Uwaifo, musician
- Archbishop Benson Idahosa, Pentecostal Church Leader
- Sonny Okosun, musician
- Augustine Eguavoen, former professional Nigerian footballer and coach
- Felix Idubor, artist
- Festus Ezeli, basketball player formerly with the Golden State Warriors
- Modupe Ozolua, body enhancement and reconstructive surgery
- Chief Tony Anenih, chairman of board of trustees (PDP) Once Minister of Work.
- Gabriel Igbinedion, international business mogul, Bini high chief, and owner of ITV
- Raymond Dokpesi, owner of Africa's largest private television network and politician
- Lancelot Oduwa Imasuen, film director, screenwriter and producer
- Suyi Davies Okungbowa, fantasy and speculative fiction author
- Osaze Peter Odemwingie, professional footballer
- Chris Aire-Iluobe, jeweler and timepiece designer
- Francis Edo-Osagie, businessman
- Kamaru Usman, professional mixed martial artist, former UFC Welterweight Champion.
- Yakubu Ayegbeni, former professional footballer
- Rema, musician
- Philip Shaibu (b. 1969), lawmaker, politician businessman, and former deputy governor of Edo State
- Eghosa Asemota Agbonifo, politician, coordinator of Michael Agbonifo shoe a child foundation
- Prof T. M. Yesufu, Vice-Chancellor of the University of Benin, economist.
- Odion Jude Ighalo, professional footballer.
- Victor Osimhen, professional footballer.
- Aisha Yesufu, socio-political activist.
- Yvonne Jegede actress, film producer, model, and television personality
- Zakariyau Oseni, professor of Arabic and a scholar of Islamic studies, guardian of Arabic language and literature, an imam and poet.
- Mike Ozekhome, legal practitioner and a human rights activist.
- Mike Oghiadomhe, chief of staff to President Goodluck Jonathan in 2014.
- Solomon Arase, former inspector general of police
- Julius Aghahowa, former professional footballer
- Sam Loco Efe (1945–2011), former Nollywood veteran actor and producer
- Admiral Augustus Aikhomu, former chief of staff in the General Ibrahim Babangida administration.
- Helen Paul, stand-up comedian and actress and popularly known as Tatafo
- Hon. Joe Edionwele, politician and member of the 8th and 9th National Assembly, Nigeria representing Edo Central Senatorial District
- Lucky Igbinedion politician and former governor of Edo State.
- Oserheimen Osunbor, a lawyer and former governor
- Osagie Ehanire medical doctor and politician
- Skales rapper, singer and songwriter.
- Nancy Isime actress, model and media personality.
- Adesua Etomi, actress
- Olumide Akpata, former president of the Nigerian Bar Association
- Queen Blessing Ebigieson, actress
- BB02, musician
- Loretta Ogboro-Okor
- Peter Akpatason, politician
- Maleke Moye Idowu, comedian
- Victor Boniface, professional Nigerian footballer who plays as a striker for Bundesliga club Bayer Leverkusen
- Lilian Imuetinyan Salami, Former Vice chancellor of the University of Benin
- Asuerinme Ighodalo, a Nigerian lawyer and politician. Former PDP Governorship Candidate of the September 2024 polls,
- MC Edo Pikin standup comedian and master of ceremony
- Johnny Drille singer, songwriter, and music producer
- Nosa Rex Okunzuwa Nollywood actor and TV producer
- Christy Ogbah, Musician
