= College of Agriculture, Iguoriakhi =

College in Edo State, Nigeria

Coordinates: 6.4821°N 5.4384°E

Edo State College of Agriculture and Natural Resources, Iguoriakhi is a state-owned institution located at Ovia South-West Local Government Area of Edo State. The institution was established by the civilian administration of late Ambrose Alli in 1981, closed by the military governors and reopened by the Lucky Igbinedion administration in 2001.

The school charged with the responsibility of offering Ordinary Diploma and Higher National Diploma in Agricultural Technology, Animal Science, Crop Science, Agricultural Extension and Management. It was temporarily closed in August 2017 by the Godwin Obaseki led government with a promise to revamping the institution. The college has been revamped and renamed Edo State College of Agriculture and Natural Resources which was previously known as College of Agriculture, Iguoriakhi. The Governor of Edo State at the pre college opening in 2023 said the college with three campuses in Iguoriakhi, Agenebode and Uromi will groom and harness the knowledge of the State's youth population to drive the government's vision to boost food production and grow its economy.
