= Anglican Diocese of Akoko Edo =

Anglican diocese in Nigeria

Coordinates: 07°17′N 06°06′E

The Anglican Diocese of Akoko Edo is one of 12 dioceses within the Anglican Province of Bendel, itself one of 14 ecclesiastical provinces within the Church of Nigeria.

Until his death in 2022, the bishop was Jolly Ehigiator Oyekpen.
