= The European University of America =

The International University of America was the precursor of Britain's International University of America in London. The European University of America began in 1980 as a small private business college in San Francisco, California. The London Campus opened in February 1992.

For more than a decade the San Francisco branch of the school, which focused largely on French students seeking an American MBA program, offered a California state-approved master's degree in international business, focusing on a single major project. Over time the university shifted its focus to London, eventually closing its San Francisco operation. It is now known as the International University of America in London.
