= Igueben =

- LGA and town
- Interactive map of Igueben
- Location in Nigeria
- Coordinates: 6°30′13″N 6°13′22″E
- Country: Nigeria
- State: Edo State

Area
  - Total: 380 km^{2} (150 sq mi)

Population (2006)
  - Total: 69,639
  - Density: 180/km^{2} (470/sq mi)
- Time zone: UTC+1 (WAT)
- Postal code: 310
- Climate: Aw

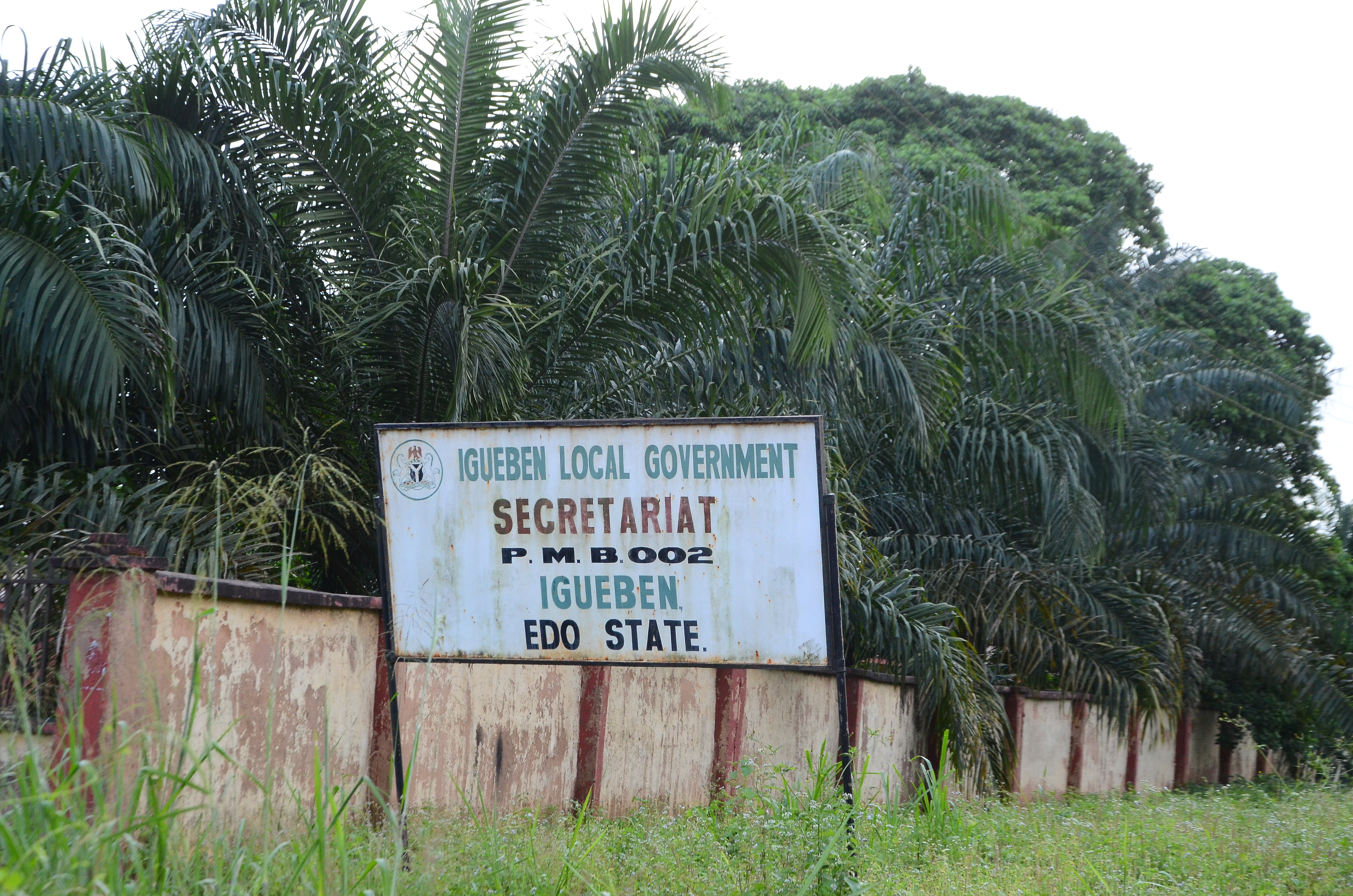
Igueben Local Government Area Secretariat

Igueben is a town and local government area of Edo State, Nigeria. which has an area of 380 km^{2} (150 sq mi) and a population of 69,639 according to the 2006 census. The postal code is 310.

== History ==
Igueben was founded around 1516 in the Southern region of Nigeria. At the time, the area was part of the Kingdom of Benin. Between 1515 and 1516, the Kingdom of Benin was at war with the Attah of the Igala Kingdom. The town was, according Dr. Christopher Okojie, settled around a camp established during this war. It is part of Esanland.

== The area today ==
The kingdom is governed by a traditional ruler, called an Onogie. The present Onogie is HRM Ehizogie Eluojerior I.

Their language is a unique dialect of Edo and Esan. They also use Pidgin English, which is a mixture of English and Esan. There is a state-run college in Igueben, and many people in the area speak English.

Igueben consists of several towns. These include Eguare, Oyomo, Afuda, Idumeka, Idumonka, Uhe, Egbiki, Ekekhen Idigun, Idumogbo, Idumedo, Idumotutu, Idumogo, and Ologhe.

== Administration ==
The Edionwele and Edions are the most senior members of the society. The Ediowele is the most senior member of that community. The Edions are the next senior in the age group. When the Edionwele dies the most senior from the Edions will succeed him.

In the old kingdom, the Oba of Benin relied on this arm of the administrative system for the smooth running of every kingdom in the empire. They were responsible to the Enogie {local king} and the Oba in Benin City. Their duties included conferring new chieftaincy titles, preparing the empires soldiers for war and more. They held the ultimate power in their own kingdoms of the Benin Empire. Today, they continue to conduct functions like overseeing Benin customs such as traditional burial rites as established by Oba Ewuare 1 and the other Warrior Kings nearly 600 hundred years ago.

Administration of Igueben today The Enogie {the Local king} and his chiefs along with The Edionwele and Edions are responsible for the administration of Igueben based on the Benin Empire structures established over 600 years ago. They issue instructions and guidance on community events and projects. This administrative group is funded directly from the Benin Royal Palace devolved funds from the National Government of Nigeria.

Below this level are the district and local groups who oversee the welfare of their local areas through established meeting groups. They discuss, plan and fund local projects. They visit families to support them for example the housebound. The local groups are effectual welfare and social security systems that ensure no member of the community is left unsupported or destitute.

Various sources of revenue fund the various meeting groups including levies and contributions from traditional rites and ceremonies like burial, public events, and donations from charity organisations (both local and international), local entrepreneurs, private and government donors.

The next group are the Youth Groups aged 12 to 25. They perform duties like ensuring security of their area by keeping out foreign troublemakers. They take on projects like road maintenance. They organise and provide social fun events like community parties.

== Transport ==
Transportation in Igueben includes private taxis, buses, the Motor bike taxi service. Many residents also use their private cars. A modern train station has recently been completed. It has been named Chief Tom Ikimi Train Station in recognition of his contributions to developments in Igueben Local Government area. It is on the line from Warri to Abuja. All train services are run by the Nigerian Railway Corporation.

Construction work on the trainline began in 1987. However the work was stopped and began again 2019, when the Nigerian government awarded a contract to the China Railway Construction Corporation to extend the Warri–Itakpe Railway to Abuja and build a new port at Warri. The work was completed in 2020 with the railway and port costing a total of $3.9 billion. The Nigerian Government provided 15% of the funds. The Chinese Railway Corporation Chinese Railway Construction Corporation provided 10%. The remaining 75% came from a Chinese bank. After its completion, the Chinese Railway Construction Corporation has received a concession to operate the port and railway for 30 years.

== Facilities ==
Major facilities include the Igueben General Hospital, the Igueben Grammar School, the Igueben College, the Igueben Mixed Secondary School, the College of Education Igueben, the Union Bank of Nigeria PLC, the Uda Community Bank PLC, primary schools, two major markets, and a Local Government Council Secretariat. There is around 22 hectares of rainforest in the Igueben area.

== Climate condition ==
Igueben in Edo State has two climate conditions which are the wet and dry season. Humidity is generally high throughout the year

The primary occupation in Igueben is farming. Local produce is cross-traded with the Northern parts of Nigeria. They sell food products peculiar to the savannah vegetation, such as tubular roots like yam, cassava (garri), banana, and plantain. They buy produce peculiar to arid areas, such as beans, onions, groundnuts, and potatoes. Foreign exports include palm produce, rubber, and timber.

== Traditional rites ==
The Igueben culture observes many traditional rites originating from their Kingdom of Benin heritage. These include the following.

Burial of women:Burial of women is an elaborate and personal affair involving the whole community of up to 5 days or more.

Burial Rites of a Chief, Elders and Men: This is a more official affair as hereditary titles are passed down from one generation to the next. Lands and other property owned by the deceased are shared amongst the male children. Female children have no rights of inheritance.

Mourning period for the widow: This is known as the Izotan, a period of wearing black and abstaining from society activities and engagements. The Izotan can last from 5 days to one or two years depending on the choice of the bereaved family and the widow.

== Educational institutions ==
Igueben is home to different educational institutions, including the College of Education, Igueben, Wisdom Group of School, Igueben, and Eguare Primary School, Eguare.

== People ==
- Tom Ikimi - Politician

== See also ==
- Benin Empire
- Esan people
