= Emotan Statue =

Equestrian statue designed in honour of Emotan

- Year: March 20, 1954
- Type: Statue
- Medium: Concrete; bronze
- Condition: Erect
- Location: Benin City
- Owner: Benin Kingdom

The Emotan Statue is a life-size statue designed in honour of Emotan, a trade chieftain who used to trade at the Oba's market in the Ancient Benin Kingdom during the reigns of Oba Uwaifiokun and Oba Ewuare the Great. The statue was unveiled on 20 March 1954 by Oba Akenzua II and is placed opposite the Oba's market in Benin City.
