= Esan South-East =

- LGA
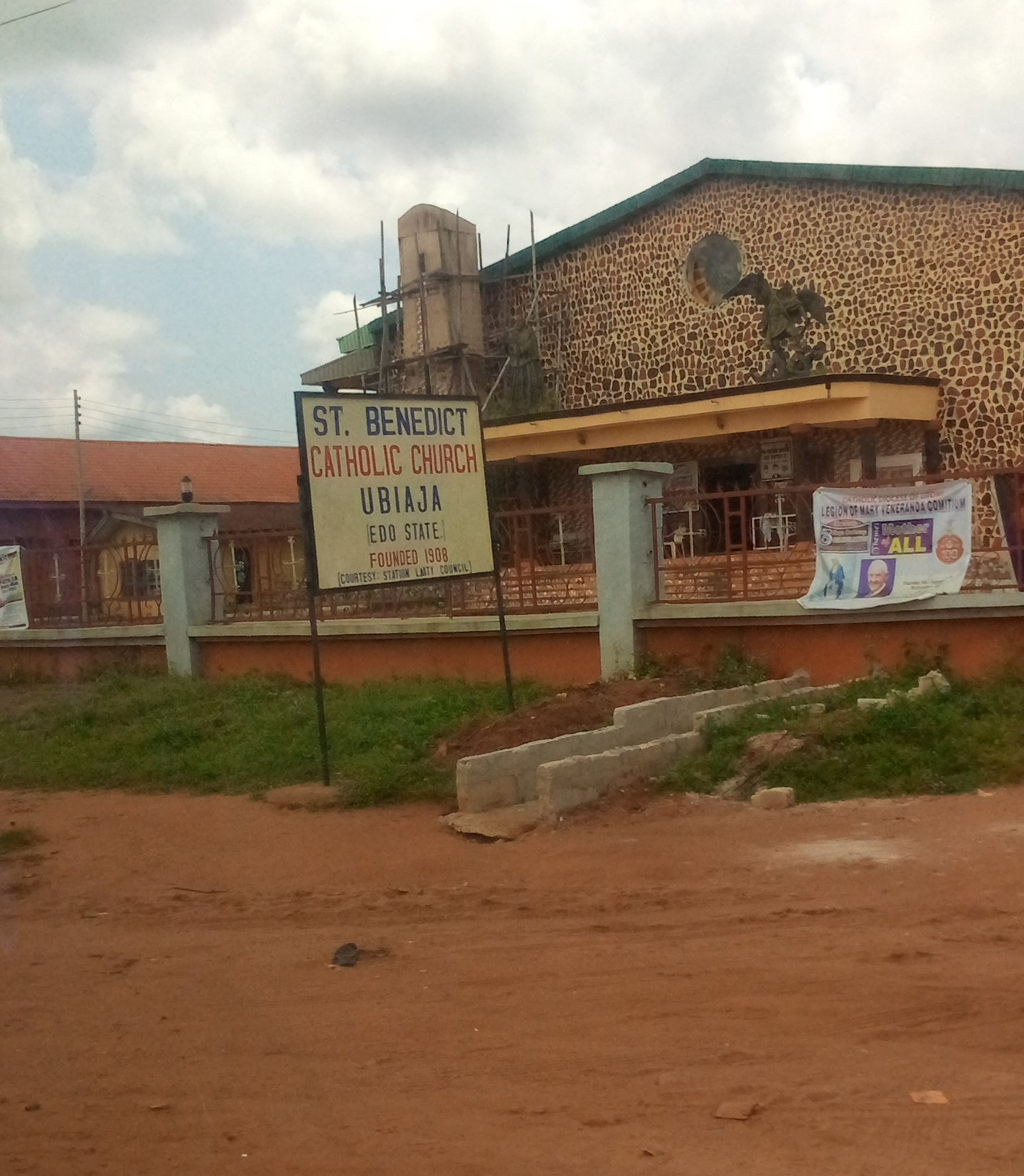
- St. Benedict Catholic Church, Ubiaja
- Interactive map of Esan South-East
- Country: Nigeria
- State: Edo State
- Capital: Ubiaja

Government
  - Local Government Chairman: Louis Imhandegbelo

Area
  - Total: 1,306 km^{2} (504 sq mi)
- Time zone: UTC+1 (WAT)

Esan South East Local Government Area is a local government area of Edo State, Nigeria. Its headquarters are in the town of Ubiaja. It shares boundaries with Kogi, Anambra, and Delta states to the east, southeast and south, respectively.

== climatic conditions ==
Esan South-East experiences a tropical climate characterized by consistently hot and humid weather throughout the year. The region has a clear rainy season lasting from April to October and a dry season from November to March. Temperatures tend to rise during the dry months, particularly between February and April, while the rainy season is marked by regular showers and thunderstorms.

== Geography ==
The delineation of boundaries was established during the European incursions into Africa. Before their penetration into the continent's interior, people generally did not define territories with clear geographical markings. Instead, natural features such as hills, landforms, rivers, and streams typically served as markers to indicate the borders between kingdoms. Esanland, for instance, is bordered to the northwest by Owan, to the northeast by Etsako, to the southwest by Orhionwon and Ika, and to the south and southeast by the Aniocha and Oshimili regions. The Esan people are thought to have originated as savannah dwellers. When they migrated to Esanland, they maintained their traditional lifestyle characterized by settling on the interfluves—higher land between rivers—while avoiding the valley areas. Their preference for settling on the upper interfluve is based on the belief that valley locations are unsuitable for their crops due to frequent flooding during the rainy season and other unfavorable conditions that would hinder agricultural productivity. Consequently, valleys were regarded as “no man's land.” To adapt to their savannah-style living, they built ponds to reduce the need to frequently visit rivers, streams, or valleys. Recent research estimates Esanland covers about 1,858 square kilometres (504 square miles), with topsoil that is exceptionally fertile, promoting abundant crop cultivation. The thriving yam staple crop in Esanland demonstrates the soil's nutritional richness. The topsoil is a mixture of sandy light brown soil and laterite, containing fine-grain sand, clay, carbonaceous shaley clays, and lignite, as noted by Professor Akinbode.

== Notable people ==
- Asue Ighodalo, former chairman of Sterling Bank

== Location ==
Esan South-East lies at latitude of 6.64503° N and longitude of 6.45345° E, within the tropical savanna (Aw) climate zone, characterized by alternating wet and dry seasons.

== Educational facilities ==
There are 113 schools in Esan South-East, covering both primary and junior secondary levels. Examples include Abhuru Primary School (Ewatto), Adava Primary School (Ugboha), Agadaga Junior Secondary School (Ubiaja), and Divine College (Ohordua). Most schools are located in towns such as Ubiaja, Ewohimi, Ohordua, and Emu, showing a wide distribution of educational institutions across the LGA.

== Health facilities ==
Esan South-East Local Government Area hosts numerous health facilities, including both public health centres and private hospitals or maternity homes. Major towns such as Ubiaja, Ewohimi, Ugboha, Ohordua, Okede, Ewatto, Illushi, and Emu have multiple facilities providing medical and maternity care. Public hospitals include General Hospital Ubiaja, General Hospital Ewohimi, and several Primary Health Centres in each community, while private facilities include Ukpokolo Nursing Home, Suru Medical Centre, and Shiloh Clinic & Maternity. These establishments collectively provide essential healthcare services to residents across the Esan South-East region.
