= Anglican Diocese of Etsako =

Anglican diocese in Nigeria

Coordinates: 7°05′N 6°17′E

The Anglican Diocese of Etsako was created and inaugurated on 14 March 2007 and is one of 13 dioceses within the Anglican Province of Bendel, itself one of 14 ecclesiastical provinces within the Church of Nigeria. The pioneer bishop was the Right Rev. Jacob O.B. Bada.

Felix Unuokhe Olorunfemi was elected to replace Bishop Bada. The Right Rev. Felix U. Olorunfemi was born on Wednesday 8 June 1966. He was educated at Bendel State University and the Ezekiel College of Theology, Ekpoma. He has served in Igbodo, Ekwuoma, Erumu and was Archdeacon of Agbor before becoming the bishop of the Diocese of Etsako. The cathedral of the diocese is All Saints' Cathedral, located at Auchi, while the Bishop's Court is at Jattu, which is a neighboring town to Auchi.
