= Ovia South-West =

- LGA
- Interactive map of Ovia South-West
- Country: Nigeria
- State: Edo State
- Headquarters: Iguobazuwa

Area
  - Total: 2,803 km^{2} (1,082 sq mi)

Population (2006)
  - Total: 135,356
  - Density: 48.29/km^{2} (125.1/sq mi)
- Time zone: UTC+1 (WAT)
- Postal code: 302

Ovia South-West is a Local Government Area of Edo State, Nigeria. Its headquarters are in the town of Iguobazuwa. It is part of Edo south senatorial district with Ondo State. It has an area of 2,803 square kilometres (1,082 mi^{2}) and a population of 135,356 at the 2006 census.

The postal code of the area is 302. The local government area is one of the two in Edo state named after the Ovia or Osse river which passes through its territory, the other being Ovia North-East.

== History ==
It has several towns and villages, such as; Aghobahi, Igueze, Usen, Ugbogui, Ora, Ajakurama, Ofunama, Abere, Inikrogha, Gbeoba, Gbolukanga and Udo. Ovia south west is a local government community in Edo State, with its headquarters in Iguobazuwa primarily by the Edo speaking people. Historically to the Benin Kingdom, the community is specify by the Ovia River (or Osse River) and is affluent in biodiversity, with supporting significant timber and agricultural activities.

=== Historical details ===
1. Origin of name: the community is named after Ovia River, which flow through the community, covering approximately 120 kilometres (75 miles) and draining into the Gulf of Guinea.
2. Cultural significance: the Ovia community is associated with the historical Ovia culture, with icon discovering its origin to a beautiful woman from a town called, Uhen which can be found near the region.
3. Economy and land use: the area is distinguish by vast lowland rainforest. It faced significant deforestation, losing roughly 17% of its tree cover between 2001 and 2024, with 95% of this loss driven by deforestation.

== Culture ==
Ovia South West in Edo State is affluent in Edo (Bini) spiritual, and artistic practice. The cultural element involve the ovia deity(goddess of Providence and peace), festival within towns like Udo,Ugbogui and Usen.

=== Cultural Aspect ===
1. Ovia Deity: the community is associated with Ovia deity, a goddess of Providence and peace, reflecting huge spiritual belien in the river and protective powers.
2. Masquerades and festivals: the region trait traditional masquerade, including the Ugbokhuokhou, which carry out rituals for spiritual well-being and to ward off evil.
3. Traditional arts and crafts: Edo culture frequent in this area, is known for its affluent history of arts such as traditional story telling, intriate, and bronze casting.

== Climate condition ==
Ovia South-West has tropical climate with hot temperature and high humidity, experience rainy season (from April to October) and dry season (from November to March). Daytime temperature range from high 20s to 30s °C (80 to 87 °F).

== Agricultural activities ==
In Ovia South-West, the agricultural activities are farming, fishing, and livestock farming. The farming involve farming of maize, cassava, Yam, okra etc. as well as rubber plantation.
