= Zakariyau Oseni =

Zakariyau Idrees-Oboh Oseni
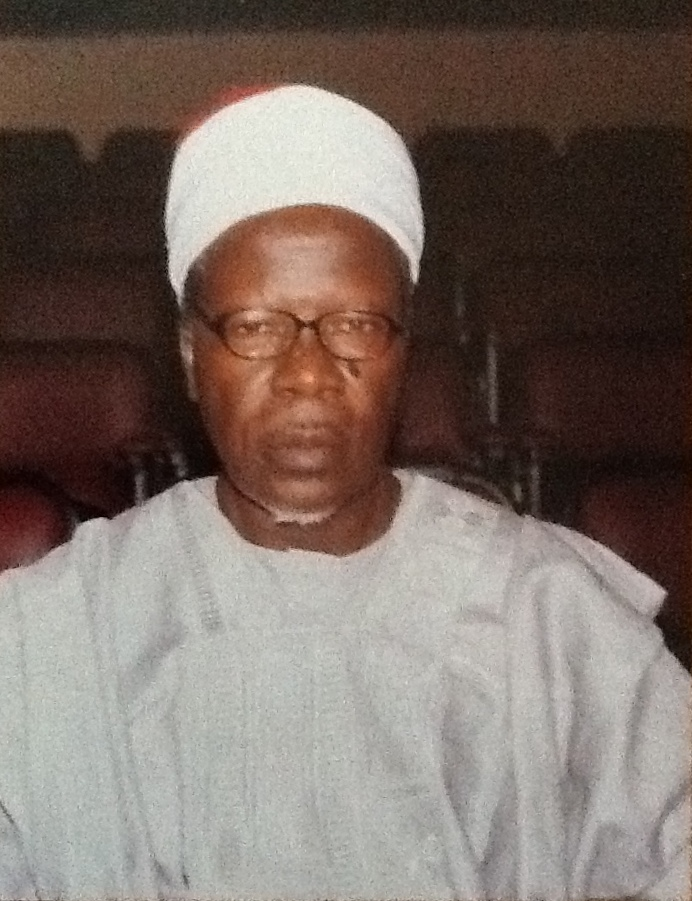
- Oseni in 2013
- Born: 20 December 1950 (age 75); Auchi, Nigeria
- Occupation: Academic

Zakariyau Idrees-Oboh Oseni Zakariyau Oseni.ogg(born 20 December 1950) is a Nigerian academic.

== Publications ==
A select list of Oseni's publications can be found on his University of Ilorin website.
