= Natasha Osawaru =

Nigerian politician

Natasha Irobosa Osawaru
- Constituency: Egor Constituency

Member of the Edo State House of Assembly

Personal details
- Born: 14 November 1994 (age 31)
- Party: Nigeria Democratic Congress
- Education: Igbinedion University
- Occupation: Politician

Natasha Irobosa Osawaru (born 14 November 1994) is a Nigerian politician. A member of the Nigeria Democratic Congress, she serves as the representative of Egor Constituency in the 8th Edo State House of Assembly.

== Early life ==
Osawaru's mother, Philomena, is the daughter of Gabriel Osawaru Igbinedion, the Esama of the Kingdom of Benin in Edo State. She attended Igbinedion University in Okada, Edo State, and Parsons School of Design in New York City, United States, where she earned a degree in Law and a master's degree in fashion design respectively.

== Political career ==
In 2023, Osawaru contested under the Peoples Democratic Party (PDP) to represent Egor Constituency. Prior to the supplementary election held on 15 April 2023 by the Independent National Electoral Commission (INEC), two contestants were marred by controversy during the 18 March 2023 election in Egor. On 16 April 2023, she was declared the winner by INEC. In June 2023, she nominated Blessing Agbebaku during the election of the speaker in the state house of assembly. On 20 June 2023, she became the Deputy Leader of Edo State House of Assembly.

== Controversy ==
Natasha came to national limelight following her intimate relationship with Nigerian singer Innocent Ujah Idibia (popularly known as 2Baba). On 13 February 2025, 2Baba proposed to her. Earlier, the singer had announced his separation from his wife Annie on Instagram.
