= Blessing Agbebaku =

Speaker of the 8th Edo State House of Assembly

The Honourable Blessing Sheriff Agbebaku
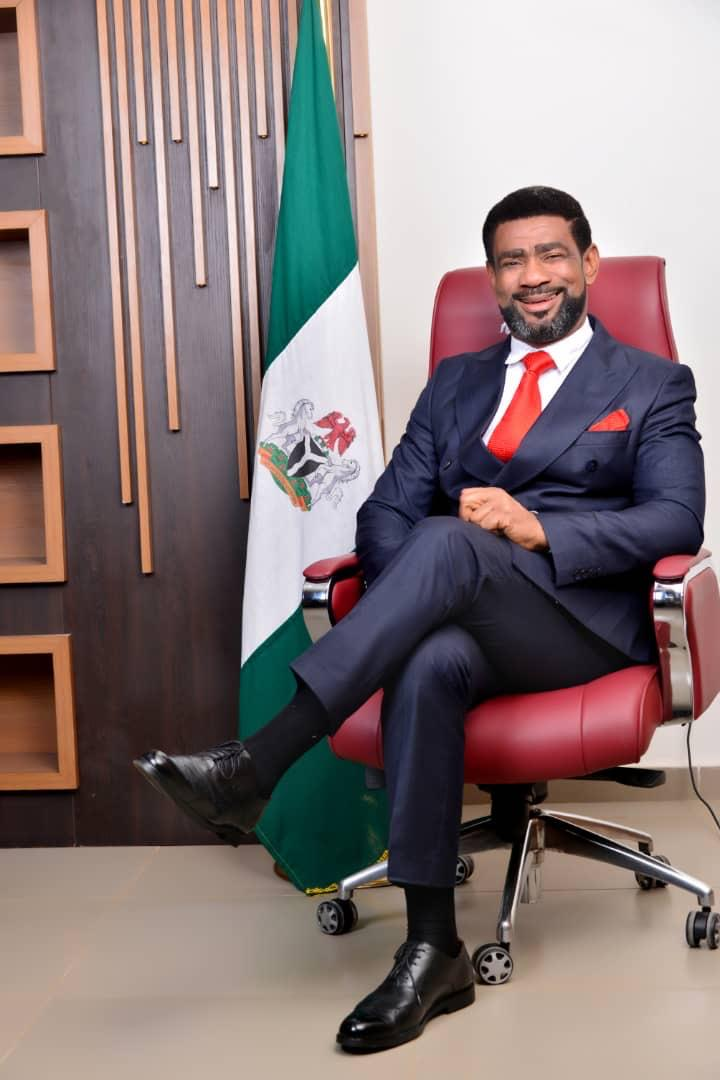

Member of the House of Representatives of Nigeria Owan West Constituency, Edo State
- Incumbent
- Assumed office 13 June 2023

Speaker of the Edo State House of Assembly
- In office 16 June 2023 – 17 August 2026
- Deputy: Maria Oligbi-Edeko; Osamwonyi Evbaguehita Atu
- Preceded by: Marcus Onobun
- Succeeded by: Osamwonyi Evbaguehita Atu (acting); Yekini Idiaye

Personal details
- Born: Blessing Sheriff Agbebaku; November 12, 1972 (age 53) Edo State, Nigeria
- Party: All Progressives Congress (APC)
- Education: University of Benin
- Occupation: Politician

Blessing Sheriff Agbebaku is a Nigerian politician who served as speaker of the eighth Edo State House of Assembly. He is a member of the All Progressives Congress (APC) representing Owan West Constituency, in the Edo North Senatorial District.

Before becoming Speaker, Agbebaku served as Chief of Staff to the Speaker of the 7th Edo State House of Assembly, Marcus Onobun. He previously represented Owan West Constituency in the Edo State House of Assembly between 2007 and 2011 before returning to the Assembly and emerging as Speaker in 2023.

== Early life and education ==
Agbebaku was born in Edo State, Nigeria on November 12, 1972. He attended primary, junior and secondary school in Edo State.He obtained his Bsc. in Economics and Statistics from the University of Benin.

== Politifal career ==
Agbebaku previously served as chief of staff to the speaker of the seventh Edo State Assembly Marcus Onobun. Agbebaku was elected to the Edo State House of Assembly in 2007 and served until 2011 when he left the house.

He was nominated for the speakership by Natasha Osawaru of the PDP representing Egor Constituency and the motion was seconded by Addeh Isibor also of the PDP representing Esan North East I. Agbebaku was elected speaker by all 24 members of the house, unopposed.

In May 2025, Agbebaku defected from the PDP to the All Progressives Congress (APC).

== Speakership ==
Following the inauguration of the 8th Edo State House of Assembly on 16 June 2023, Blessing Agbebaku was unanimously elected Speaker by the 24 member House. He was nominated by Natasha Osawaru, who represents Egor Constituency, and his nomination was seconded by Addeh Isibor, representing Esan North-East Constituency.

Upon his election, Agbebaku pledged to provide inclusive leadership, work harmoniously with members irrespective of political affiliation, and strengthen the legislative and oversight responsibilities of the Edo State House of Assembly in the interest of the people of Edo State.

During his tenure as Speaker, the Assembly considered bills and resolutions on governance and oversight matters, while the leadership of the House emphasized cooperation between the legislative and executive arms of government in advancing development in Edo State.
