= Osaigbovo Iyoha =

Nigerian politician and engineer

Chief of Staff to the Governor of Edo State
- Incumbent
- Assumed office June 2021
- Governor: Godwin Obaseki

Member of the Edo State House of Assembly for Oredo East Constituency
- In office 2015–2019

Personal details
- Born: 6 July 1973 (age 53)
- Party: Peoples Democratic Party
- Education: Ambrose Alli University
- Occupation: Politician

Osaigbovo Iyoha is a Nigerian engineer and politician who served as the Chief of Staff to the Governor of Edo State, Godwin Obaseki, since June 2021. He is associated with the Peoples Democratic Party (PDP) and was a member of the Edo State House of Assembly for Oredo East Constituency from 2015 to 2019.

== Early life and education ==
Iyoha was born on 6 July 1973. He holds a bachelor's degree in Mechanical Engineering from Ambrose Alli University and a master's degree in Industrial Engineering from the University of Benin (UNIBEN). He is pursuing a PhD in Industrial Engineering at UNIBEN.

== Political career ==
Iyoha served as Chief Whip during his tenure in the Edo State House of Assembly. He was appointed as Chief of Staff in 2021.

As Chief of Staff, Iyoha participates in the administrative operations and commentary of the Edo State government.

On July 2024, Iyoha has commended Chief Matthew Evbakor Oshodin, for helping the Edo State government in tackling youth rest restiveness, alongside closing the unemployment gap and making wealth in Edo State.
