= Maria Edeko =

Nigerian politician

The Honourable Maria Edeko
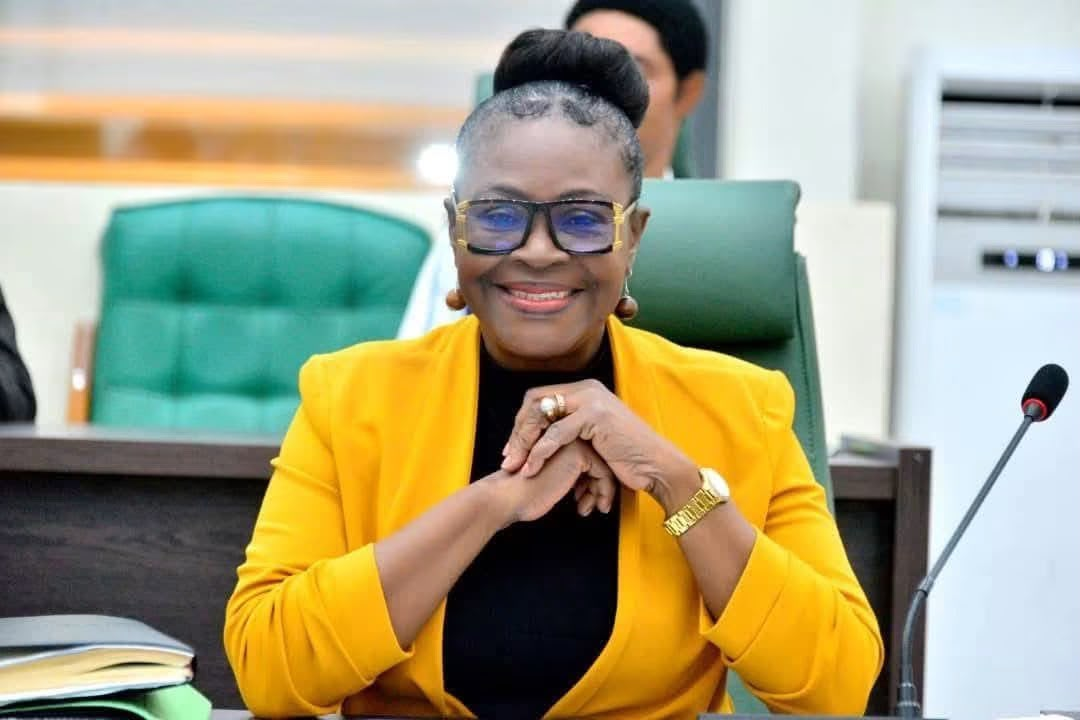

Deputy Speaker, Edo State House of Assembly
- In office 16 June 2023 – 19 May 2025
- Speaker: Blessing Agbebaku
- Succeeded by: Osamwonyi Atu

Member of the Edo State House of Assembly representing Esan North-East II Constituency
- Incumbent
- Assumed office 11 June 2023
- Constituency: Esan North-East II

Personal details
- Born: Maria Omozele Oligbi Edeko; 12 May 1963 (age 63) Uromi, Edo State, Nigeria
- Party: Peoples Democratic Party
- Education: University of Benin; Nigerian Law School
- Occupation: Politician; Lawyer

Maria Omozele Oligbi Edeko is a Nigerian politician, lawyer and lawmaker serving as the representative for the Esan North-East II Constituency in the Edo State House of Assembly. She was elected into the House of Assembly at the 2023 elections under the Peoples Democratic Party (PDP). She previously served as the deputy speaker, Edo State House of Assembly from 2023 to 2025.

== Early life and education ==
Maria Omozele Oligbi Edeko was born on 12 May 1963 in Uromi, Esan North-East Local Government Area of Edo State, Nigeria.

She attended Local Authority Primary School, Efandion, Uromi, in Esan North-East Local Government Area, Our Lady of Lords Girls Grammar Secondary School, before proceeding to College of Education, Abraka, Delta State, where she studied Foreign Languages (French).

She earned a degree in French Education in 1991, a master's degree in Public Administration from University of Benin in 1997, a Bachelor of Law (LL.B) in 2000 from the University of Benin, a Barrister-at-Law (B.L.) in 2004 from the Nigerian Law School which eventually led to her call to the bar, and a Master of Laws (LLM) from the University of Benin in 2007.

== Political career ==
Edeko began her political career as an aspirant for Esan North-East Constituency in the 2019 State Houses of Assembly elections, where she lost. She was later appointed as commissioner for the Ministry of Social Development and Gender Issues, Edo State, serving from 2019 to 2023.

=== Election to the Edo State House of Assembly ===
Edeko was first elected to the Edo State House of Assembly in 2023, representing the Esan North-East II Constituency.

=== Deputy speaker ===
On 16 June 2023, she became the deputy speaker of Edo State House of Assembly, a role she held until May 2025 after she voluntarily resigned.
