= Uyigue Igbe =

Nigerian politician

Speaker of the Edo State House of Assembly
- Incumbent
- Assumed office 2011
- Constituency: Oredo West Constituency

Member, Edo State House of Assembly

Personal details
- Occupation: Legislature

Uyigue Igbe is a Nigerian politician and former Speaker of Edo State House of Assembly. In 2011, Uyigue Igbe won the ticket for Oredo West constituency to represent the constituency at the state House of Assembly.

== Family ==
Uyigue Igbe is the son of Chief Sam Odighi Igbe, the Iyase of Benin Kingdom.

== See also ==
Edo People
