= Osasu Igbinedion =

CEO of TOS Group (1992)

Osasu Igbinedion Ogwuche
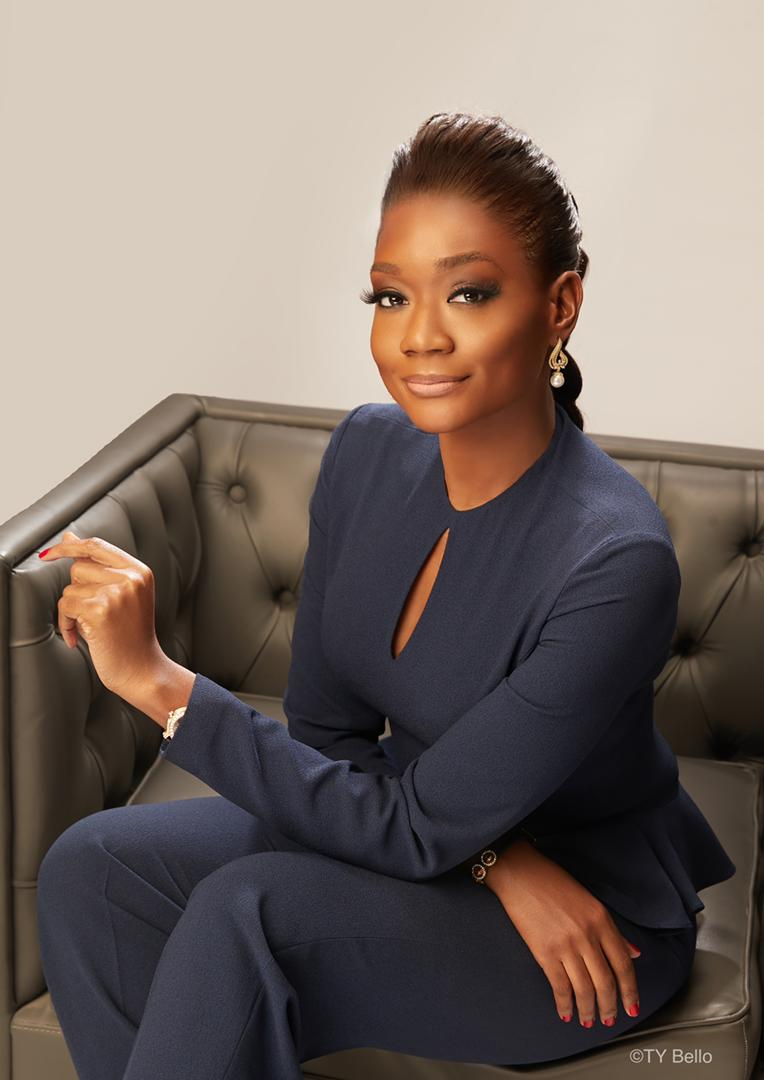
- Born: August 25, 1992 (age 34); London, United Kingdom
- Occupations: • CEO of TOS Group of Companies • Founder of The Osasu (TOS) Foundation Africa
- Spouse: Nathaniel Joshua Ogwuche (m. 2022)
- Website: tosfafrica.org

Osasu Igbinedion Ogwuche (born August 25, 1992) is a Nigerian-British media entrepreneur, philanthropist, and business executive. She is the Chief Executive Officer of TOS Group of Companies, home to TOS TV NETWORK; a platform focused on pan-African storytelling, TOS Foundation, NatSu Global; a firm involved in real estate and media investments.

She convenes the Osasu Show Symposium, a platform for discussions among stakeholders from the public and private sectors on matters related to nation-building and development.

She is also the Founder and Executive Director of The Osasu Show (TOS) Foundation, a non-governmental organization that provides capacity-building programs and financial literacy initiatives for women, political leadership training, and educational scholarships for children. Additionally, she previously hosted The Osasu Show, a syndicated television program covering development, business, and politics in Nigeria and the United Kingdom.

== Early and personal life ==
Osasu was born in the United Kingdom. She is the daughter of Eki Igbinedion and Lucky Igbinedion, the former governor of Edo State. Her grandfather, Gabriel Igbinedion, holds the title of Esama of the Benin Kingdom in Nigeria. She holds a bachelor's degree from Stonehill College in Easton, Massachusetts, and a master's degree from Northeastern University in Boston, Massachusetts.

She also completed a certificate program in TV and film production at the New York Film Academy. In 2022, she completed an executive program in Advanced Management and Leadership at the University of Oxford's Saïd Business School, and in 2023, she obtained an executive certificate in Leadership from the Harvard Kennedy School. Osasu is married to Nathaniel Joshua Ogwuche, and they have two children.

== Career ==
Osasu holds a bachelor's and a master's degree in communications from Stonehill College and Northeastern University in Massachusetts, USA. She also obtained a certificate in TV and film production from the New York Film Academy.

In 2015, she was selected as one of several journalists from across Africa to be trained by the United Nations as media ambassadors for the Sustainable Development Goals (SDGs). By 2016, her program, The Osasu Show, was airing on major TV stations in Nigeria and the UK. As a journalist, she has reported from various regions in Nigeria, including Agatu and the Ogoni area.

In 2018, Osasu won the DAAR Award for Young Achiever of the Year and received the 2019 Social Media for Social Good Award Africa. That same year, she was appointed by the Independent National Electoral Commission (INEC) as a media ambassador for promoting free and fair elections in the Federal Capital Territory (FCT). Osasu is a co-founder of NatSu Global, a real estate and media investment firm with offices in Abuja, London, Johannesburg, and Boston.

In 2018, Osasu Igbinedion, the host and producer of The Weekend, a contemporary breakfast show that covers a variety of topics, including entertainment, lifestyle, and politics, expressed enthusiasm about the show's upcoming launch, stating, "I’m excited for the launch of The Weekend – coming to your screens very soon! It’s going to be epic."

She also hosted The Osasu Show, which aired on African Independent Television (AIT), BEN TV London, and ITV for seven years (2015–2022), reaching audiences in Nigeria and the UK. Osasu is the founder of The Osasu Show Foundation and organized the Osasu Show Symposium, a forum for political stakeholders and their constituents to discuss development and welfare issues, particularly those concerning the less privileged.

== Awards and recognition ==
- 2015: Humanitarian Award from La Mode Magazine
- 2016: West Africa Students Union Parliament Kwame Nkrumah - Exemplary Distinguished Leadership Honour
- 2017: The Institute For Service Excellence And Good Governance - Service excellence award for The Osasu Show Journalistic excellence
- 2017: Nigeria Entrepreneurs Award - Role Model to the Girl Child
- 2018: Green October events award - Humanitarian of the Year
- 2018: Nigerian Youth Advocacy For Good Governance Initiative Award
- 2018: The Girl's Show Nigeria Award
- 2018: Emerging entrepreneurs multi-purpose cooperative society - Outstanding Innovation and Leadership Award
- 2018: Woman On Fire Abuja Awards- Seasoned professional of the year.
- 2018: La Mode Magazine Green October Humanitarian Awards
- 2018: Global Race Against Poverty And Hiv/Aids In Conjunction With SDSN Youths Global impact ambassador award
- 2018: Paint My Face With Glamour, a compilation of Poems by Benjamin Ubiri in Honour of Osasu Igbinedion.
- 2018: National Impact Merit Awards - Most outstanding TV personality of the year
- 2018: Nigeria Young Professionals Forum 2018
- 2018: DAAR Awards Prize - Young Achiever of the year
- 2019: The Difference Global Awards - Media personality of the year award
- 2019: Social Media For Social Good Awards Africa.
