= Andrew Edobor Uzamere =

Nigerian politician

Hon. Andrew Edobor
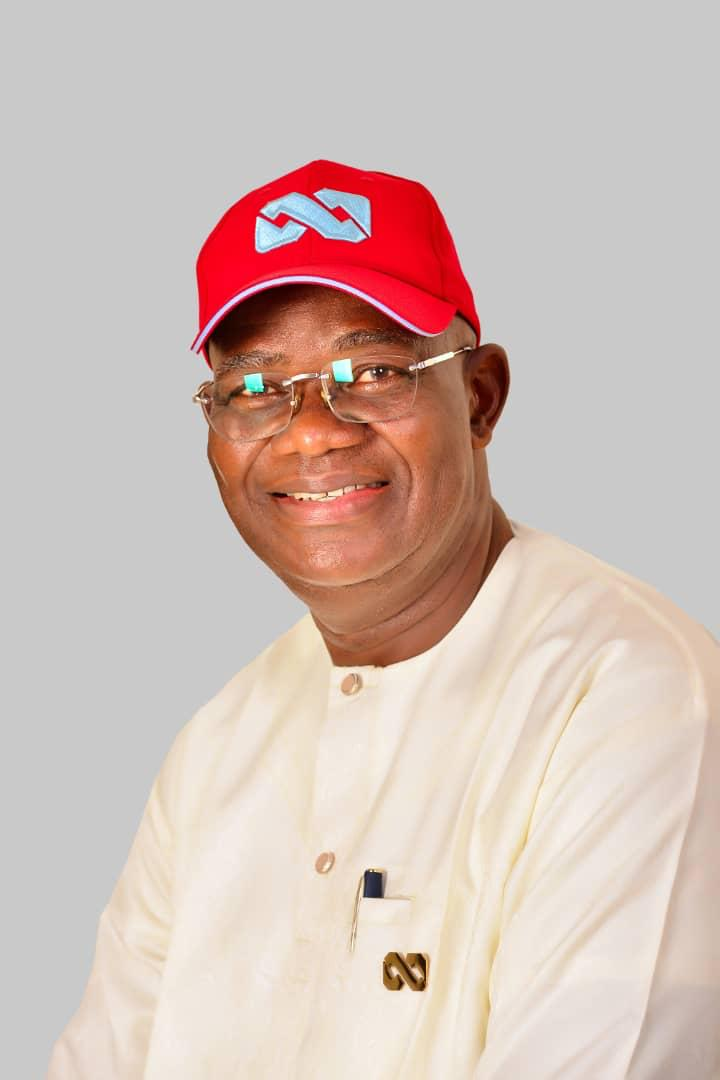

Member of the Edo State House of Assembly for Ovia North-East Local Government Area II Constituency
- Constituency: Ovia North-East Local Government Area II
- Incumbent
- Assumed office June 2023

Personal details
- Born: 22 September 1962 (age 63) Benin City, Edo State
- Party: All Progressives Congress (since 2025)
- Other political affiliations: Peoples Democratic Party (until 2025)
- Education: SUNY
- Occupation: Politician

Andrew Edobor Uzamere is a Nigerian politician. He is currently a member representing Ovia North-East Local Government Area II Constituency at the Edo State House of Assembly.

== Early life ==
Andrew Edobor Uzamere was born on 22 September 1962 and hails from Benin City, Edo State. He began his early education at St. Stephen's Primary School from 1968 to 1973 and then Eghosa Anglican Grammar School, Benin City for his Secondary education from 1974 to 1979. He subsequently proceeded to the United States, where he studied Accountancy and Finance at the SUNY , College at Old Westbury, Long Island, from 1982 to 1985 and was employed as a staff accountant in corporate America.

== Political career ==
After contesting for legislative office on three occasions, 2011, 2015, 2019 respectively. He won the 2023 General Elections after four attempts. He was inaugurated into the 8th Edo State House of Assembly on the 16th of June,2023, as the member representing Ovia North-East Local Government Area II Constituency at the Edo State House of Assembly.

He held the position as Chairman of the House Standing Committee on Solid Minerals and Oil & Gas. He was later reassigned as Chairman of the House Standing Committee on Public Accounts (PAC).

=== Defection to the APC ===
After being a member of the People's Democratic Party (PDP) for several years,In July 2025, Uzamere declared his intention to join the All Progressives Congress and on July 25, 2025, he officially defected to the party after a long time of media speculation.
