= Elizabeth Ativie =

Nigerian politician

Elizabeth Ativie is a Nigerian politician who served as Deputy Speaker of the Edo State House of Assembly 25 July 2016. She served as the Speaker of the house of Assembly from 9 May 2016 till 24 July 2016.

== Early life and education ==
Elizabeth Ativie is a native of Edo State but she grew up in several parts of Nigeria due to the nature of her father's job who was a policeman. She holds a BSc certificate in health education and a MSc certificate in sociology and anthropology.

== Career ==
Elizabeth once worked as a professional nurse in the Edo State Civil Service until 2006 when she retired as a director. Her political career began in 1999. In 1999 and 2003, she contested for a seat in the Edo State House of Assembly but had to step down on both occasions for one of her party's candidates.

Elizabeth contested and won a seat in the state House in the 2007 general elections. The election was later nullified by a tribunal. Her determination, however, paid off in 2011, when she won a seat to represent Uhunmwode Constituency in the state House.

Upon the impeachment of Victor Edoror on 3 May 2016, Elizabeth became the first woman to become Speaker of the Edo State House of Assembly following her swearing into the position on May 9, 2016. On 25 July, she stepped down to Deputy Speaker after a motion was moved by the Majority Leader, Folly Ogedengbe, who cited "matters of urgent public importance, for a change in the leadership of the House". She was replaced by Justin Okonoboh.
