= Charity Aiguobarueghian =

Nigerian politician (born 1976)

Charity Iguodala Aiguobarueghian
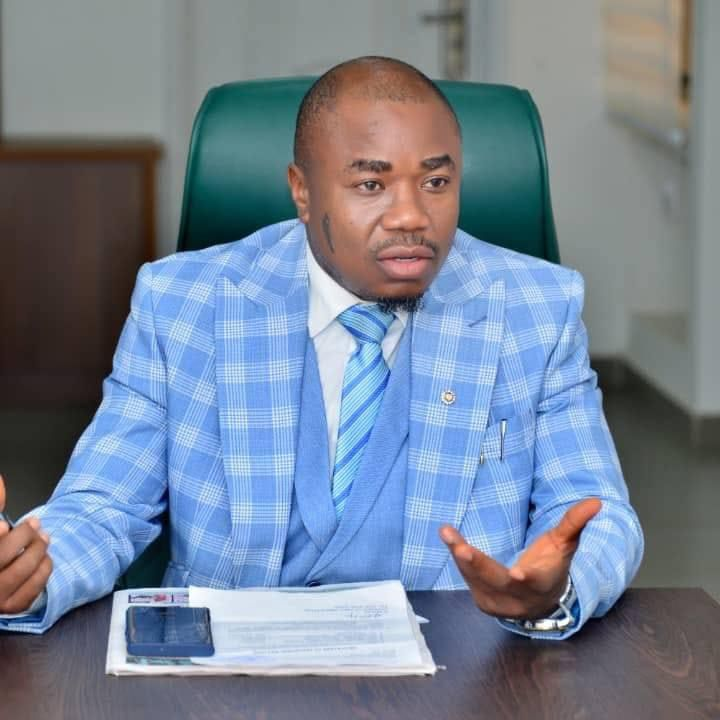

Member of the Edo State House of Assembly for Ovia North-East Local Government Area I Constituency
- In office June 2023 – June 2027
- Governor: Godwin Obaseki

Personal details
- Born: 24 November 1976 (age 49) Ekiadolor, Edo State
- Party: Peoples Democratic Party
- Education: University of Benin
- Occupation: lawyer and politician

Charity Iguodala Aiguobarueghian (born 24 November 1976) is a Nigerian lawyer and politician. Aiguobarueghian is currently representing Ovia North-East Local Government Area I Constituency in the Edo State House of Assembly. Aiguobarueghian serves as the majority leader of the 8th Assembly.

== Early life and education ==
Aiguobarueghian was born on November 24, 1976, in Ekiadolor, Ovia North-East Local Government Area of Edo State. Aiguobarueghian was educated at Azagba primary School, in Okha, Ovia South West Local Government Area. He attended Ekiadolor Secondary School and proceeded to University of Benin where he earned his LLB and LLM degrees in law.

== Legal career ==
Upon graduation from University of Benin, in Benin City, Edo State, Aiguobarueghian worked as an Associate in the law firm of Arthur Obi Okafor, SAN & Associates and served as chairman of Edo State Law Commission in 2021.

== Politics ==
Aiguobarueghian was elected to the Edo State House of Assembly on the People's Democratic Party (PDP) platform to represent Ovia North-East Local Government Area I Constituency in 2023. He was appointed as Majority Leader of the Edo State House of Assembly.
