= Krexx Nv =

Nigerian singer and songwriter (born 1996)

- Born: Honest Ornan Okoawo; 9 July 1996 (age 30); Benin City, Edo
- Citizenship: Nigerian
- Education: Ambrose Alli University
- Occupations: Singer, songwriter
- Years active: 2012–present
- Musical career
- Genres: Afrobeats; Afropop; Dancehall; hip hop; Amapiano; R'n'B
- Instruments: Vocals; keyboards
- Label: Nimble Nova Entertainment
- Website: krexxnv.com

Honest Ornan Okoawo (born 9 July 1996) known professionally as Krexx Nv, is a Nigerian singer and songwriter. He was born and raised in Benin City, Edo State.

== Early life and education ==
Honest Ornan Okoawo was born to a Christian family on 9 July 1996 in Benin City. Krexx Nv originates from Esan North-East Local Government Area, Edo State, Nigeria. He attended Federal Science and Technical College (FSTC) in Uromi, where he completed his secondary education. Krexx Nv gained admission to study mechanical engineering at the Ambrose Alli University (AAU), Ekpoma and graduated in 2020.

== Career ==
Krexx Nv Started his music career professionally in 2012, recording freestyles and cover songs, drawing inspiration from artists like Kendrick Lamar and 50 Cent. After some years, Krexx Nv relocated to Lagos, where he started building his career and releasing music under Cadence Central Distribution.

=== 2019–2023: Musical career and record deals ===
Between 2019 and 2023, Krexx Nv has released over 15 singles. He was signed to a record label and had a five-year deal. After some years, he decided to terminate his music contract which led to some legal issues between his previous record label and music producer. All his songs were taken off all music platforms and he lost all his streams and playlist placements on his music.

In 2024, Krexx Nv started re-uploading his music leaving out some that were taken down from platforms and later in May 2024, he released his debut single for the year titled "Reason" featuring Nigerian singer Shi Boi. Its official video premiered on MTV Base in Nigeria.

=== 2024: Intel (Inside the Eko Life) – present ===
In 2024, Krexx Nv debuted his album, INTEL (Inside The Eko Life). It was released on 26 July 2024 and has 7 songs. The album got on various playlists on music platforms and had national radio plays across cities in Nigeria.

In October 2024, Krexx Nv released "Hello" which gained attention on major music streaming platforms and was featured on several radio stations in Nigeria.

== Awards and nominations ==
Year	Organization	Awards	Recipient	Result	Ref
2019	Top Naija Music Awards	Most Promising Artiste	Himself	Won	
2024	DTME Awards	Best Vocal Performance	Krexx Nv – "Hello"	Won	
2024	Edo Festival and Awards	Best Edo Young Musician of the Year	Himself	Nominated	

== Discography ==
=== Selected Singles ===
- "Hello"
- "HeroShima"
- "Summer Vibes"
- "Wake Up"
- "Sky Residency"
- "Close to Me"
- "Solidion"
- "Road Side" (with Shi Boi)
- "Reason"

=== Albums ===
- Intel (Inside the Eko Life) (2024)
