= Osamwonyi Evbaguehita Atu =

Nigerian politician

Deputy Speaker of the Edo State House of Assembly
- Incumbent
- Assumed office 19 May 2025
- Preceded by: Maria Oligbi-Edeko

Acting Speaker of the Edo State House of Assembly
- In office 17 August 2026
- Preceded by: Blessing Agbebaku
- Succeeded by: Yekini Idiaye

Minority Whip of the Edo State House of Assembly
- In office 2023–2025

Member of the Edo State House of Assembly
- Incumbent
- Assumed office 2023
- Constituency: Orhionmwon East Constituency

Personal details
- Party: All Progressives Congress (APC)
- Occupation: Politician

Osamwonyi Evbaguehita Atu also known as Atu Osamwonyi is a Nigerian politician and lawmaker serving as the Deputy Speaker of the Edo State House of Assembly. He represents Orhionmwon East Constituency in Edo State, Nigeria. He is a member of the All Progressives Congress (APC).

== Political career ==
Atu was elected as a member of the Edo State House of Assembly representing Orhionmwon East Constituency during the 2023 Nigerian general elections.

Following his election, he was appointed Minority Whip of the Edo State House of Assembly in 2023, serving as one of the principal officers of the legislature.

== Deputy Speaker of Edo State House of Assembly ==
In 2025, Atu was elected Deputy Speaker of the Edo State House of Assembly following the resignation of Maria Oligbi-Edeko. His emergence made him one of the principal officers of the state legislature.
