= Addeh Isibor =

Nigerian politician

Addeh Emankhu Isibor is a Nigerian politician. He currently serves as the State Representatives representing Esan North East I constituency at the Edo State House of Assembly.

In October 2024, six months after his suspension in May 2024, Isibor was reinstated by the Edo State House of Assembly following an allegation that he had planted charms in the assembly complex.
