= Damilola Sunday Olawuyi =

Nigerian international lawyer

Damilola Sunday Olawuyi SAN
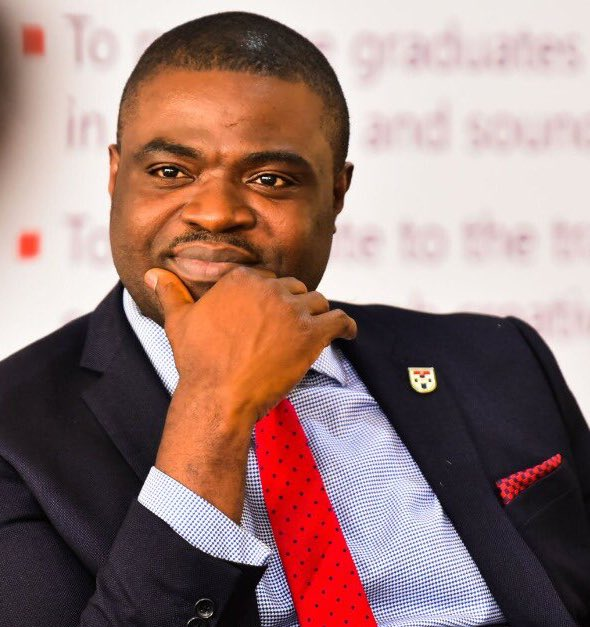
- Incumbent
- Assumed office October 1, 2019

Personal details
- Born: Damilola Sunday Olawuyi; August 28, 1983 (age 43) Ibadan, Oyo State, Nigeria
- Education: Igbinedion University; University of Calgary: University of Oxford; Harvard University
- Occupation: Academic; Author; Lawyer
- Website: www.damilolaolawuyi.com

Damilola Sunday Olawuyi is an international jurist, professor of law, arbitrator, author and policy consultant, with expertise in petroleum, mining, energy and environmental law. He is the Deputy Vice Chancellor of Afe Babalola University, Ado Ekiti, Nigeria. Professor Olawuyi was promoted to the rank of full professor of law at the age of 32 years, becoming one of the youngest full professors of law in Nigerian history. He became a Senior Advocate of Nigeria (Queen's Counsel eqv.) in 2020, aged thirty-seven, becoming the youngest academic ever elevated to the rank of a senior advocate of Nigeria.

He is Vice Chair of the International Law Association. He has served as a BOK Visiting International Professor (VIP) at the University of Pennsylvania Law School, visiting professor at Columbia Law School, New York, China University of Political Science and Law, IAS Vanguard Fellow at the University of Birmingham, and senior visiting research fellow at the Oxford Institute for Energy Studies. In 2019, he was a Herbert Smith Freehills visiting professor at Cambridge University. He has delivered lectures on energy law in over 40 countries. In 2020, he was appointed as an Independent Expert on the African Union's Working Group on extractive industries, environment and human rights. In 2021, he was appointed by President Muhammadu Buhari as a member of the Governing Board of the Nigeria Extractive Industries Transparency Initiative. In 2022, he was appointed by the president of the United Nations Human Rights Council to represent Africa as an Independent Expert on the UN Working Group on Business and Human Rights. He holds the UNESCO Chairs on Environmental Law and Sustainable Development at Hamad Bin Khalifa University, Doha, Qatar. In 2023, he addressed the United Nations General Assembly as the Chairperson of the UN Working Group on Business and Human Rights, presenting a report titled "Extractive Sector, Just Transition and Human Rights."

== Education ==
An indigene of Igbajo Town in Boluwaduro Local Government Area of Osun State of Nigeria, Olawuyi was born in Ibadan. He had his early education at INRI Nursery and Primary School, Ibadan and completed his secondary school education at Igbinedion Secondary School, Benin City, where he sat for and excelled in his West African School Certificate Examination in 2000. While in secondary school, he was popularly known as the "Authority" because of his passionate interest in national, legal and political affairs. He was an avid reader of all of the most popular newspapers in Nigeria at that time.

At the age of twenty one, he graduated from Igbinedion University, Okada, Nigeria with a first-class degree in law, with all of the available prizes, and was named overall best graduating student and University Valedictorian (2005). The following year, he graduated with the highest first-class honours awarded that year by the Nigerian Law School (2006) thereby becoming the very first private university graduate in Nigerian history to bag a first class at the highly competitive Nigeria Law School. In the next year, he was awarded a Government of Alberta Scholarship enabling him to study at the University of Calgary, Canada, where he obtained the degree of Master of Laws in natural resources, energy and environmental law (2008). After receiving a Diploma in International Environmental Law from the United Nations Institute for Training and Research, Switzerland, he received a Graduate Scholarship from Harvard University, where he obtained the degree of Master of Laws in international law and sustainable development (2009). In the next year, he was awarded four prestigious scholarships (Clarendon Scholarship Award, Overseas Research Scholarship, Government of Canada's Social Science and Humanities Research Scholarship, and the A G Leventis Scholarship) which enabled him to complete a Doctor of Philosophy in Law degree at Keble College, Oxford (2013).

Olawuyi published The Human Rights Based Approach to Carbon Finance in 2016. The book, which is an expanded version of his doctoral thesis, received the International Law Association (Nigeria) Book Prize in 2016.

Olawuyi is a licensed member of the bars of Nigeria, Alberta, Canada and Ontario, Canada. He has practiced and taught law in Europe, North America, Asia, Africa, and the Middle East. He was formerly an energy lawyer at Norton Rose Fulbright Canada LLP where he served on the firm's global committee on extractive investments in Africa. He later became the deputy director of environmental law at the Centre for International Governance Innovation, Waterloo, Canada.

== Research ==
Olawuyi's research interest focuses on sustainable development, with expertise in petroleum, natural resources, energy, environment, and agricultural law. Since he became a full professor, he has supervised several undergraduate and postgraduate students. He had published several scholarly articles in reputable academic journal as well as conference abstracts and monograph. Olawuyi has published close to a hundred articles, book chapters and books on petroleum law, energy and international environmental law. His most recent book publications include Environmental Law in Arab States (Oxford University Press, 2022), Local Content and Sustainable Development in Global Energy Markets (Cambridge University Press, 2021), Climate Change Law and Policy in the MENA Region (Routledge, 2021), The Human Rights-Based Approach to Carbon Finance (Cambridge University Press, 2016) and Extractives Industry Law in Africa (Springer, 2018).

Olawuyi has received numerous awards and fellowships. He is a member of several national and international professional bodies including the Academic Advisory Group of the International Bar Association.

In 2018, Olawuyi was appointed as an expert member of the Federal Technical Committee on National Oil Spill Detection and Response Agency Bill, Committee on Environment and Habitat, Federal House of Representatives, Government of Nigeria, Abuja. Olawuyi is a regular media commentator on all aspects of natural resources, energy, and environmental law.

== Awards and honours ==
- 2024: Weeramantry International Justice Award.
- 2023: American Society of International Law, Certificate of Merit for high technical craftsmanship and utility to lawyers and scholars, for Environmental Law in Arab States (Oxford University Press, 2022).
- 2020: Senior Advocate of Nigeria.
