= Osezua Sunday Ojiezele =

Nigerian politician

Majority Leader of the Edo State House of Assembly
- Incumbent
- Assumed office 17 August 2026

Member of the Edo State House of Assembly
- Incumbent
- Assumed office 17 June 2019
- Constituency: Esan South-East

Personal details
- Party: All Progressives Congress (2024–present)
- Other political affiliations: Peoples Democratic Party (2020–2024); All Progressives Congress (2019–2020)

Osezua Sunday Ojiezele is a Nigerian politician who currently serves as the Majority Leader of the Edo State House of Assembly, representing the Esan South-East constituency. He was first elected to the state assembly in 2019 and won re-election in March 2023.

== Political career ==
Ojiezele contested for the Esan South-East constituency seat in the Edo State House of Assembly during the 2019 general elections under the platform of the All Progressives Congress (APC). He was among the initial nine members inaugurated into the 7th Assembly on 17 June 2019 following a leadership crisis within the state legislature. During his first term, he served as Deputy Leader of the House.

In October 2020, Ojiezele, alongside Speaker Frank Okiye and five other members, defected from the APC to the Peoples Democratic Party (PDP), citing internal factions within the state chapter of the APC.

Under the PDP platform, Ojiezele secured re-election to represent the Esan South-East constituency in the 8th Assembly during the 18 March 2023 state assembly elections.

In December 2024, Ojiezele returned to the APC, attributing his departure from the PDP to internal leadership disputes within the party at both state and national levels.

=== Majority Leader ===
On 17 August 2026, following the resignation of Speaker Blessing Agbebaku and a reorganization of principal officers in the 8th Assembly, the APC majority caucus nominated Ojiezele as the Majority Leader of the Edo State House of Assembly.
