= Akokhia Abdulganiyu =

Nigerian politician in Edo State

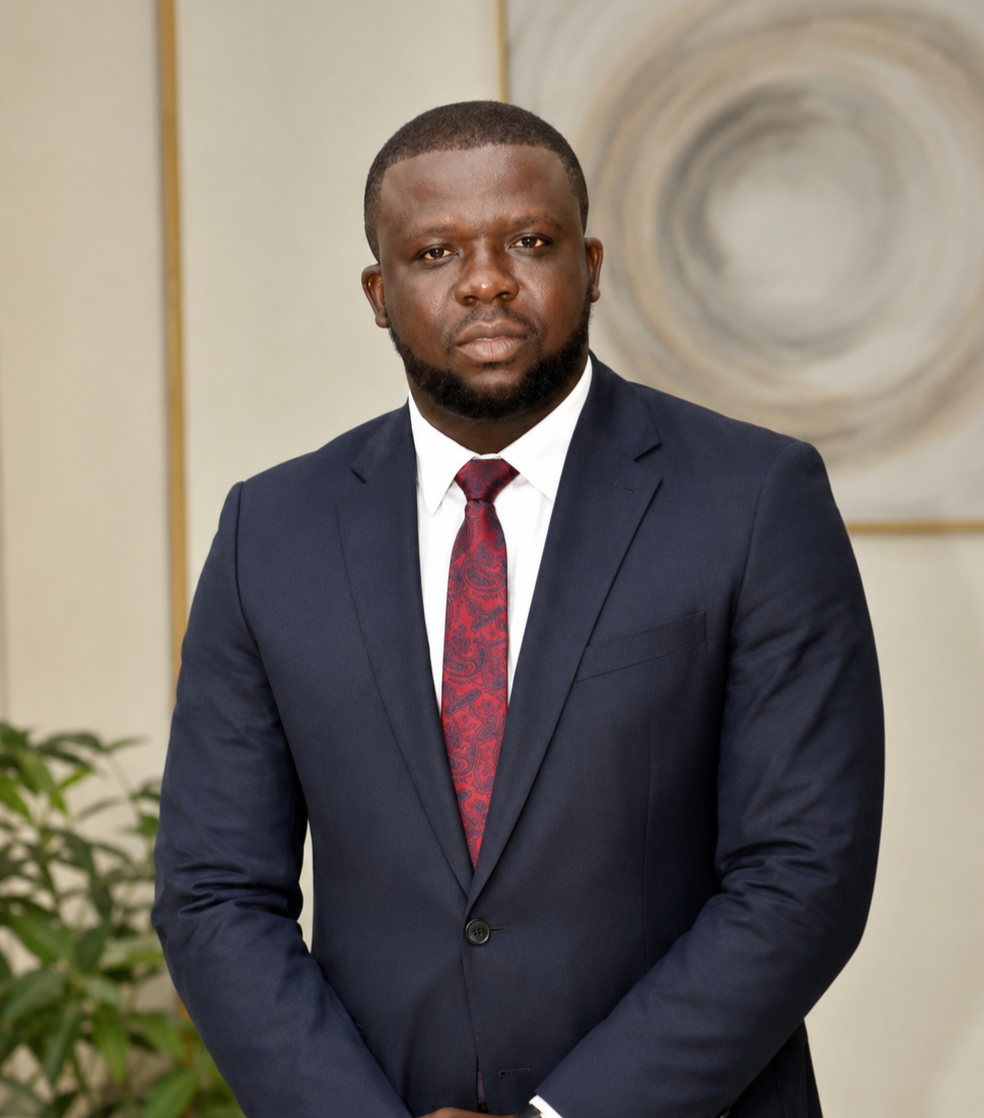

Member of the Edo State House of Assembly
- Incumbent
- Assumed office June 2023
- Constituency: Etsako West II

Personal details
- Party: All Progressives Congress (APC)
- Occupation: Politician

Akokhia Abdulganiyu is a Nigerian politician who serves as a member of the Edo State House of Assembly. He represents the Etsako West II constituency under the All Progressives Congress (APC).

== Early life ==
Abdulganiyu was born in Edo State, Nigeria.

== Political career ==
Abdulganiyu contested and won election under the All Progressives Congress (APC) platform to represent the Etsako West II constituency at the Edo State House of Assembly.
