= Okada Air =

Nigerian airline

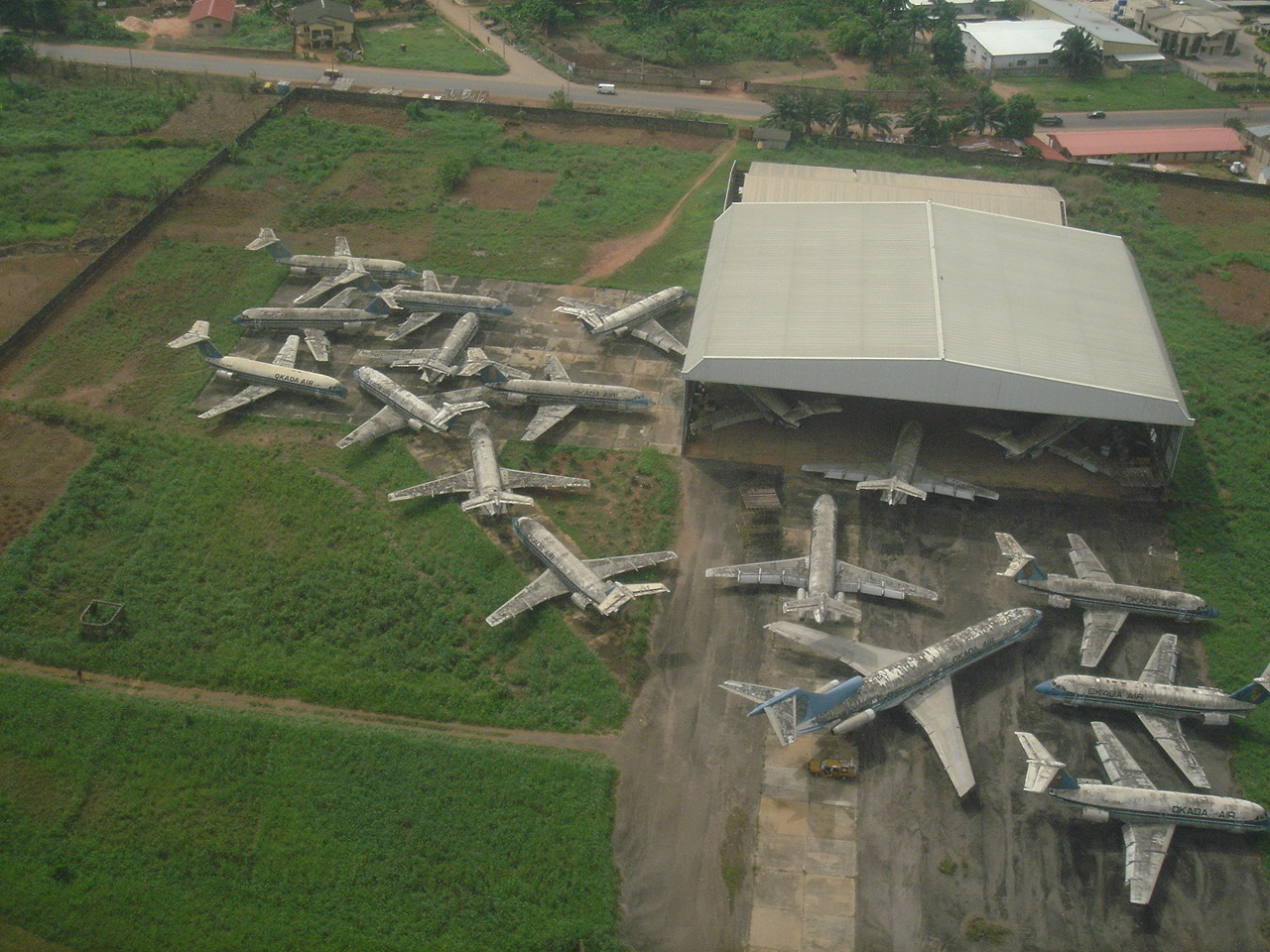
IATA	ICAO	Call sign
9H	OKJ	OKADA AIR
- Founded: 1983
- Commenced operations: September 1983
- Ceased operations: 1997
- Destinations: 9

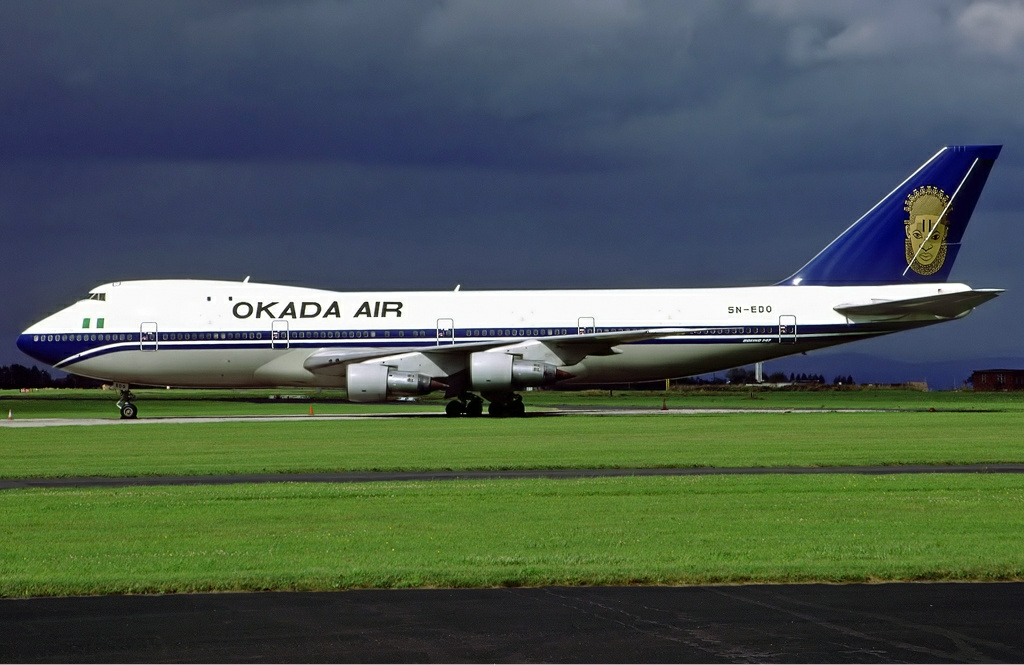
Okada Air Boeing 747-100, Manchester, 1993

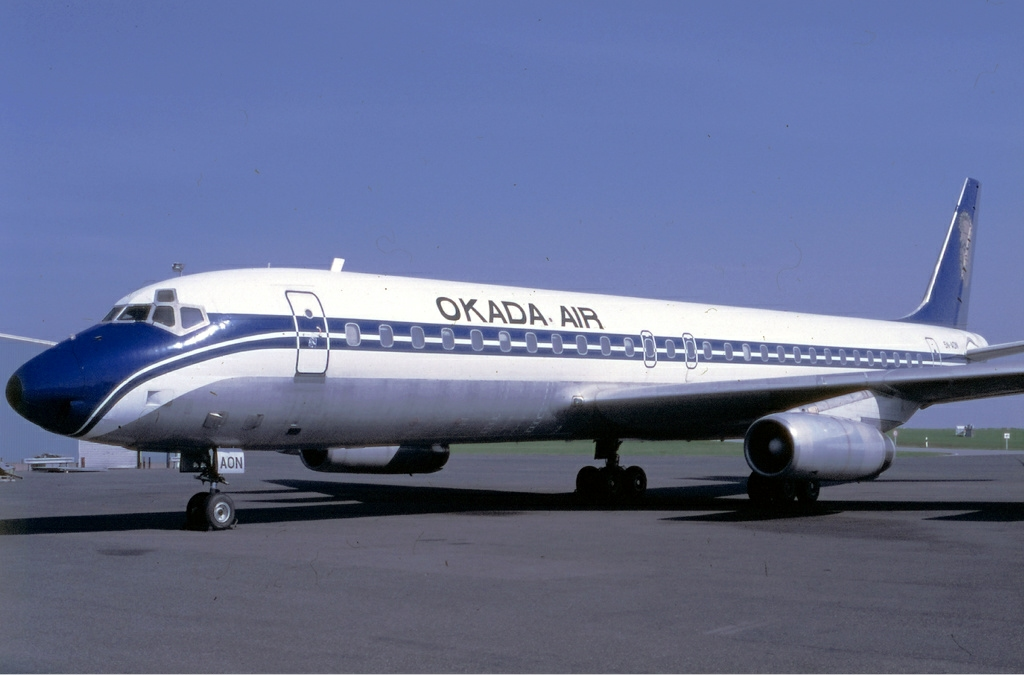
Okada Air Douglas DC-8, Luxembourg, 1985

Okada Air was an airline based in Benin City, Nigeria. The carrier was established in 1983 with a fleet of BAC-One Eleven 300s and started charter operations in September the same year. In 1984, a Boeing 707-355C was acquired for cargo operations. By 1990, ten BAC One-Elevens were bought, and eight more were acquired in 1991. The company was granted the right of operating international flights in 1992.

The owner of Okada Air was Chief Gabriel Igbinedion, the Esama of Benin. In 1997, the company was disestablished.

== Destinations ==
Okada Air served the following destinations throughout its history:

- Abuja – Nnamdi Azikiwe International Airport
- Benin – Benin Airport
- Enugu – Akanu Ibiam International Airport
- Jos – Yakubu Gowon Airport
- Kaduna – Kaduna Airport
- Kano – Mallam Aminu Kano International Airport
- Lagos – Murtala Muhammed International Airport
- Port Harcourt – Port Harcourt International Airport
- Yola – Yola Airport

== Historical fleet details ==
- BAC One-Eleven-200
- BAC One-Eleven-300
- BAC One-Eleven-400
- BAC One-Eleven-500
- Boeing 727-200
- Boeing 707-300
- Boeing 747-100
- Douglas DC-8-62
- Sud Aviation Caravelle
- Dornier 228-100
- PZL W-3 Sokół (one)

== Accidents and incidents ==
=== Fatal accidents ===
- 26 June 1991: A BAC One-Eleven 402AP, registration 5N-AOW, force-landed 10 kilometres (6.2 mi) off Sokoto Airport due to fuel exhaustion. There were three fatalities, all of them passengers. The aircraft had been diverted from the original Benin City–Kano route because of bad weather at the airport of destination.

=== Non-fatal hull-losses ===
- 7 September 1989: A BAC One-Eleven 320AZ, registration 5N-AOT, that was finalising a domestic scheduled Lagos–Port Harcourt passenger service, was written off on a hard landing caused by bad weather at Port Harcourt Airport.
- 1992: A Dornier 228-100, registration 5N-NOR, resulted damaged beyond repair on landing at an unknown location in Nigeria.

== See also ==
- Transportation in Nigeria

== Bibliography ==
- Guttery, Ben R. (1998). Encyclopedia of African Airlines. Jefferson, NC: McFarland & Company. ISBN 0-7864-0495-7.
