= Ahmed Waziri Oshomah =

Nigerian politician from Edo

Member of the Edo State House of Assembly
- Incumbent
- Assumed office June 2023
- Constituency: Etsako Central

Personal details
- Party: All Progressives Congress
- Parent: Waziri Oshomah (father)
- Profession: Politician

Ahmed Waziri Oshomah (commonly known as Oshomah Ahmed) is a Nigerian politician who serves as a member of the Edo State House of Assembly, representing the Etsako Central under the platform of the All Progressives Congress (APC).

== Early life and family ==
Oshomah was born in Edo State, Nigeria. He is a son of the Afemai highlife musician, Alhaji Waziri Oshomah.

== Political career ==
=== 2019 House of Assembly campaign ===
In 2019, Oshomah contested for the Etsako Central Constituency seat in the Edo State House of Assembly on the platform of the All Progressives Congress (APC).

=== 2023 election and legislative service ===
In May 2022, Oshomah secured the nomination of the All Progressives Congress (APC) for the Etsako Central Constituency.

In the March 18, 2023 Edo State House of Assembly election conducted by the Independent National Electoral Commission (INEC), Oshomah contested against candidates from other political parties and was declared the winner to represent Etsako Central Constituency. He was subsequently inaugurated into the 8th Edo State House of Assembly.
