= Donald Okogbe =

Nigerian politician

Okogbe Ojemeh Donald is a Nigerian politician. He currently serves as a member representing Akoko-Edo II in the Edo State House of Assembly.

In October 2024, six months after his suspension in May 2024, Okogbe was reinstated by the Edo State House of Assembly following an allegation that he had planted charms in the assembly complex.
