= Omosigho Uyi Frank =

Nigerian politician

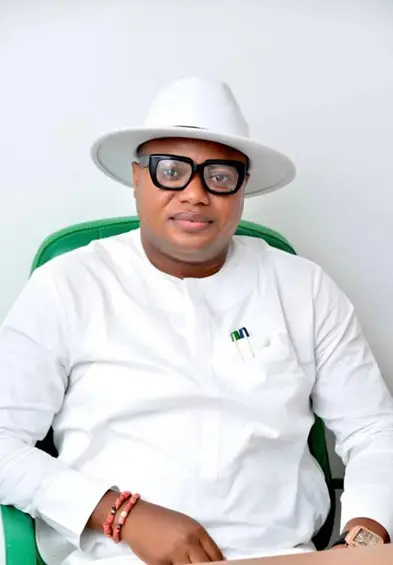
- Constituency: Oredo East Federal Constituency
- In office 2023–2027

Personal details
- Born: 7 September 1976 (age 50) Edo State, Nigeria
- Party: Former Peoples Democratic Party (PDP); Current All Progressives Congress (APC)
- Education: University of Benin
- Occupation: Politician; Community Advocate

Omosigho Uyi Frank is a Nigerian Politician and Community Advocate. He currently serves as State Representative representing Oredo East Federal Constituency in the Edo State House of Assembly.

== Early life and education ==
Omosigho Uyi Frank was born in Edo State, Nigeria. He graduated with an OND in Computer Science from the Federal Polytechnic Offa Kwara State and later completed a Bachelor of Science (B.Sc.) in Computer Science from University of Benin (UNIBEN).

== Politics ==
Omosigho Uyi Frank was first elected into the Edo State House of Assembly in the 2023 supplementary elections to represent Oredo East Federal Constituency under the Peoples Democratic Party (PDP). On December 13, 2025, he announced his defection from Peoples Democratic Party (PDP) to the All Progressive Congress.
