= Kaycee Osamwonyi =

Nigerian Politician

Honourable Kaycee Osamwonyi

Member of the Edo State House of Assembly
- Incumbent
- Assumed office 16 June 2023
- Constituency: Uhunmwonde Constituency

Member, House Committee on Budget and Appropriation
- Incumbent
- Assumed office 2023

Personal details
- Party: People's Democratic Party (2023–2025); All Progressives Congress (2025–present)
- Occupation: Politician
- Known for: Member of the Edo State House of Assembly

Kaycee Osamwonyi is a Nigerian politician serving as a member of the Edo State House of Assembly, representing Uhunmwonde Constituency. He was elected on the platform of the People's Democratic Party (PDP) in the 2023 Edo State House of Assembly election before defecting to the All Progressives Congress (APC) in April 2025.

== Political career ==
Osamwonyi was elected to represent Uhunmwonde Constituency in the Edo State House of Assembly during the 2023 general election under the People's Democratic Party (PDP). Following his inauguration, he became a member of the House Committee on Budget and Appropriation.

=== Legislative activities ===
In March 2024, Osamwonyi sponsored a motion of urgent public importance calling on the Edo State House of Assembly to summon the management of the Benin Electricity Distribution Company (BEDC) and the Transmission Company of Nigeria (TCN) over persistent power outages in Edo State. The House adopted the motion and summoned both organisations to appear before the Assembly.

== Legislative committees ==
Osamwonyi serves as the Chairman of the Edo State House of Assembly Committee on Agriculture and Food Security. He is also a member of the House Committee on Budget and Appropriation. His committee responsibilities include legislative oversight on matters relating to agricultural development, food security policies, and budgetary processes within Edo State.

In 2025, he moved another motion calling for a ban on illegal metal scavengers in Edo State, citing increasing incidents of vandalism and theft of public infrastructure. The House subsequently resolved to urge the Edo State Government to establish a task force to address the issue.

=== Defection to the APC ===
On 9 April 2025, Osamwonyi defected from the People's Democratic Party to the All Progressives Congress (APC). During his reception by Governor Monday Okpebholo, he attributed his decision to internal divisions within the PDP and described his move as a "homecoming", stating that he had previously belonged to the APC.

Governor Monday Okpebholo welcomed Osamwonyi into the APC, stating that the defection strengthened the party's majority in the Edo State House of Assembly.

== See also ==
- Edo State House of Assembly
- All Progressives Congress
- People's Democratic Party (Nigeria)
- Edo State House of Assembly
