= Iyamu Bright =

Nigerian politician

Iyamu Bright Aitenguoba is a Nigerian politician. He currently serves as the State Representative representing Orhionmwon II constituency at the Edo State House of Assembly.

In October 2024, six months after his suspension in May 2024, Iyamu was reinstated by the Edo State House of Assembly following an allegation that he had planted charms in the assembly complex.
