= Marcus Onobun =

Nigerian politician

The Honourable Marcus Iziegbeaya Onobun
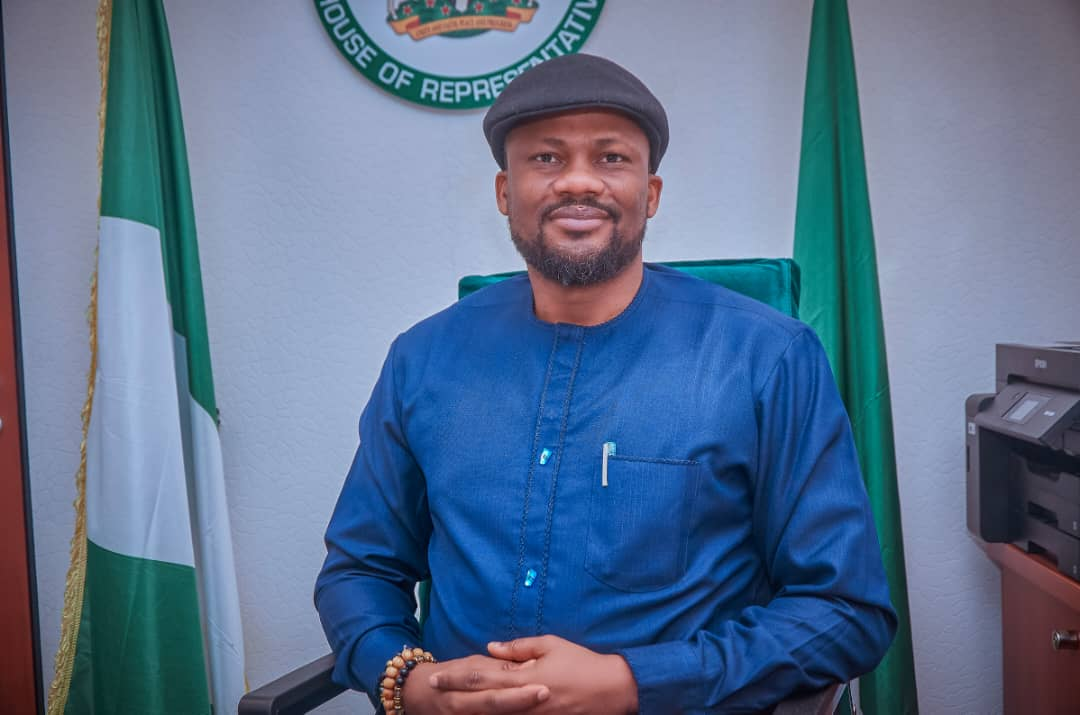
- Marcus Onobun at the Green Chamber in 2023

Member of the House of Representatives of Nigeria for Esan Central/Esan West and Igueben Federal Constituency, Edo State
- In office 13 June 2023 – 13 June 2027
- Preceded by: Joe Edionwele

Speaker of the Edo State House of Assembly
- In office 10 October 2020 – 30 May 2023
- Preceded by: Francis Okiye

Personal details
- Born: Marcus Iziegbeaya Onobun; August 22 Benin City, Edo State, Nigeria
- Party: People's Democratic Party (Nigeria), PDP
- Parent: 2
- Education: Ambrose Alli University
- Occupation: Politician
- Website: marcusonobun.org

Marcus Iziegbeaya Onobun is a Nigerian politician and member of the 10th National Assembly representing Esan Central/Esan West/Igueben Federal Constituency, Edo State.

== Early life and education ==
Marcus was born into the family of Mr and Mrs Isaac Iregbeyen Onobun of Idumuza quarters Iruekpen, Ekpoma, Esan West Local Government Area, Edo State. He had his primary and secondary education in Ekpoma before gaining admission to study Geography and Regional Planning at the Ambrose Alli University, Ekpoma, Edo State, where he obtained his BSc Degree. He was honored by the Institute of Political Administration and Management with a Doctorate Fellow (DFIPAM) in 2021. He obtained a Postgraduate Diploma (PGD) in Public Administration from Benson Idahosa University, Benin City, Edo State.

== Professional Courses and Certification ==
- Professional Certification, Legislative Process in Government Institute of Governance, hosted by University of Ottawa Canada.
- Certificate of Attendance, The Role of Public Account Committee in Government Expenditure, held in Nairobi, Kenya.

== Political career ==
Upon graduation from the university, he joined the defunct Action Congress of Nigeria. He was the Pioneer coordinator of Action Youths for Oshiomhole, General Secretary of Edo in Safe Hands Group, Lead Partner of Esan Coalition, and President of Esan Peace Initiative. He rose to the position of Deputy Chairman, "Together we Can Great Things Initiatives (TGID)", a local NGO dedicated to Youth advocacy and empowerment. He was also a frontline leader of the All Progressive Congress in Esan West LGA and a former Special Assistant to the former Governor of Edo State, Comrade Adams Aliu Oshiomhole, from 2008-2012. He was later elevated to the position of Senior Special Assistant on Youth Matters in December 2012. Barely less than four months on this role, he was elevated to the position of Executive Director, Youth Affairs, Edo State, a position he held until November 2016. Rt. Hon. Marcus Onobun contested election under the platform of the APC into the Edo State House of Assembly to represent the people of Esan West Local Government Area, Edo state. As a Member of the House, he was appointed Deputy Leader. He served in different House Committees- Chairman, House Committee on Infrastructure, Physical Planning and Urban Development, Member, House Committees on Education. Local Government/Community Affairs, Environment/Sustainability and Arts, Culture and Diasporal Affairs. He was elected Speaker on March 14, 2020. During his tenure as Speaker, the House passed over fifty Bills, and notable among them are: .

- A Law to Repeal the Bendel State Audit Law of 1982 to Provide for the Establishment of Edo State and Local Government Audit Service Commission and the office of the Auditor-General for Edo and for Connected Purposes;
- A Law to Provide for the Establishment of the Edo State Sports Commission;
- A Law to Establish the Edo State College of Agriculture and Natural Resources and other Matters Connected Therewith;
- A Law to Provide a Framework for the Promotion, Co-ordination, Propagation, Monitoring, and Regulation of Investment in Edo State;
- A Law to Repeal the Provision of the Edo State Violence Against Persons (Prohibition) Law, 2019, and to Enact the Edo State Violence Against Persons (Prohibition) Law, 2021
- A Law for the Establishment of Edo State Flood, Erosion, and Watershed Management Agency;
- A Law to Establish the Edo State Public Building and Maintenance Agency;
- A Law to Enact the Edo State Public Procurement Agency Law, 2020 and Related Matters; and to Repeal the Public Procurement Law, 2012;
- A Law to Repeal the Edo State College of Nursing and Midwifery Law, 2015, and to Enact the Edo State College of Nursing Sciences Law, 2021;
- A Law to Repeal the Edo State Private Property Protection Law, 2017, and to Re-enact the Edo State Private Property Protection Law, 2021;
- A Law to Amend and Harmonize Provisions of the Retirement Age of Staff of Polytechnics and Colleges of Education Rules, 2021;
- A Law to Establish the Edo State Diaspora Agency;
- A Law to prohibit Open Grazing of Cattle and other Livestock in Edo State, 2022;
- A Law to Ensure the full Integration of Persons with Disabilities into the Society and to Establish the Edo State Commission of Persons with Disabilities;
- A Law to Repeal the Forestry Law 1968 and to Enact a Law to Establish the Edo State Forestry Commission to Provide for the Preservation and Conservation of Forests;
- A Law to Establish the Edo State Justice Sector Reform Team and other Matters;
- A Law for the Operation of Lotteries, Lotto and other Matters Connected Therewith;
- A Law to Amend the Edo State House of Assembly Service Commission Law 2001 and Other Matters Connected Therewith;
- A Law to Amend the Privatization and Commercialization Law, 2000;
- A Law to Amend a Law to Prohibit Trafficking in Persons, and to Establish the Edo State Task Force Against Trafficking in Persons and other Related Matters;
- A Law to Eliminate Violence in Private and Public Life, Prohibit All Forms of Violence Against Persons, and Provide Maximum Protection and Effective Remedies for Victims and Punishment of Offenders and Other Matters Connected Therewith;
- A Bill for a Law to Repeal the Rural Electrification Board Law 1972; To Make Provision for Electricity and its Generation, Transmission, and Distribution within and for Residents of Edo State; To Establish an Electricity Market for Edo State, and for Connected Purposes; and
- The Edo State Local Government Electoral Law and the Edo State Independent Electoral Commission Establishment (Re-Enactment) (Amendment) Law, 2022;.

In 2020, a few months before the former Governor of Edo State, Obaseki, was elected to a second term in office, he aligned with the Governor to decamp to the People’s Democratic Party (PDP). In 2023, he contested under his new political party for the House of Representatives seat to represent the people of Esan Central, Esan West, and Igueben Federal Constituency, Edo State, which he won with a majority of votes. He is currently the chairman of the House Committee on Rural Development.

== Bills and Motions ==
=== Motions ===
- Need to investigate the Universal Service Provision Fund (USPF) in providing widespread availability and usage of network services and application services across rural communities in Nigeria;
- Motion on the urgent need to intervene on the failed portions of Benin-Ekpoma-Auchi-Okene Road;
- Need for CBN to put an end to the series of postponement of Monetary Policy Committee (MPC) Meetings in Nigeria;
- Need for the Federal Government to curb brain drain of skilled health care professionals in Nigeria;
- Urgent Need to Investigate the proposed use of a one hundred and fifty million United States Dollar World Bank Loan, for the importation of Meters;
- Motion to urge the Federal Government to extend the rail lines to South-South, South-East, North-Central and North-West geo-political Zones of Nigeria;
- Need for the Federal Government to address the nations Auto Manufacturing sub-sector;
- Motion to Urge the Federal Government to rename Irrua Specialist Teaching Hospital to Admiral Augustus Akhabue Aikhomu Specialist Hospital;
- Motion on the Need for the Federal Government to Extend the Conversion Incentive Program of the Presidential CNG Initiative to Private Vehicle Owners in Nigeria;
- Motion for The Setting-Up of an Ad-Hoc Committee to Investigate Post-Covid-19 Social Investment Programs in The Country;
- Motion to Investigate the Implementation of President Bola Ahmed Tinubus Palliative Intervention Programs Occasioned by Fuel Subsidy Removal;
- Motion on the Urgent Need for Price Control of Commodities in Nigeria;
- The Need to investigate the Role of USAID and other International Non-Governmental Organizations (NGOs) in Nigerias Lingering Security Challenges.
- Urgent Need Curb The Rate of Incessant Killings in Edo State.

=== Bills ===
- Nigerian Energy Development Bank Establishment Bill, 2024
- Prohibition of Open Urination and Defecation Bill, 2024
- Finance Act (amendment) bill, 2023
- Fiscal Responsibility Act (Amendment) Bill, 2023
- National Integrated Rural Development Bill, 2024
- Federal College of Agriculture Ebelle (Establishment) Bill, 2023; and
- A Bill for an Act to Repeal the Fiscal Responsibility Act, 2007, and Enact the Fiscal Responsibility Act, 2024
- Physical Asset and Infrastructure Management Institute Establishment Bill, 2024
- Federal University of Tropical Medicine, Irrua (Establishment) Bill, 2024)
- Nigerian Communications (Amendment) Bill, 2024
- National Assembly (Establishment) Bill, 2025

== Community Intervention Project ==
=== Health Project Equipment ===
- Supply of Medical Equipment to Federal Medical Centre Illeh
- Supply of Medical Equipment to Urohi Health Centre.
- Construction of Ogwa Primary Health Care Centre.
- Construction of Ujemen Health Care Centre.

=== Agriculture Project ===
- First Batch Distribution of 500 Bags of NPK Fertilizers to Farmers Across the three LGAs (Esan Central, Esan West and Igueben).
- Second Batch Distribution of 500 Bags of NPK Fertilizers Across the three LGAs (Esan Central, Esan West and Igueben).

=== Women and Youth Empowerment ===
- First Batch Entrepreneurship Training and Empowerment with Sewing Machines and ₦100,000 grants of 50 Women and Youth in Tailoring Business Across the three LGAs (Esan Central, Esan West, and Igueben).
- Second Batch Entrepreneurship Training and Empowerment with Sewing Machines of 150 Women and Youth across the Three LGAs (Esan Central, Esan West and Igueben)
- First Batch of 20 Means of Transportation (Motorcycles) to constituent across the three LGAs.

=== Road Projects ===
- Construction of Internal Road Network in College of Medicine, Ambrose Alli University, Ekpoma, Edo State.
- Town Planning Road, Iruekpen.
- Ojemen Road.
- Idumebo Road.
- Ihumudumu - Ozalla Road.
- Construction of Otor Road, Idumoza, Iruekpen.
- Construction of Mandella Street Road Ihumudumu.
- Rehabilitation of Dora Road, Ekpoma.
- Construction of Oseghale Street of Iruekpen Market Road.
- Construction of Abhulimen Street Road.
- Rehabilitation of Cele Church Road, Ekpoma.
- Rehabilitation of Osebor Street, Ekpoma Road.

=== Rural Electrification Project ===
- Installation of 20 Poles of Solar Powered Street Lights at Mousco Road Ujoelen.
- Installation of 20 Poles Solar Powered Street Lights at Mandella Street.
- Provision and Installation of a Transformer at Ojo Street, Ihumudumu.
- Provision and Installation of a Transformer at Idumoza.
- Provision and Installation of a Transformer at Arkadia.
- Provision and Installation of 2 Transformers at Illeh Community.
- Replacement of Wooden Electric Poles with Concrete Poles at Iruekpen.

=== Water Project ===
- Drilling of Solar Powered Borehole at Ihumudumu Primary School.
- Reactivation of Borehole at Igueben.
- Drilling and Installation of Solar Borehole at Urohi.
- Drilling and Installation of Borehole at Ukuta, Eberle.

=== Education Project ===
- Construction of six Class Rooms Blocks at Ukpughete Primary School.
- Construction of three Class Rooms Block at Afuda Primary School.
- Complete Renovation and Furnishings of a Block of three Class Rooms at Iduwele Girls Secondary School.
- Award of ₦50,000 each to 30 University Students across the LGAs.
- Construction of 2 Block of six Class Rooms each at the proposed Police College, Ewossa.
- Construction of a Block of 3 Class Rooms at Central Primary School Iruekpen.
- Construction of a Block of 3 Classrooms at Uwendova Primary School.
- Construction of a Block of 3 Classrooms at Emaudo Primary School.
- Fencing of Imule Primary School at Illeh.
- Construction of Egoro Amende Secondary School.
- Foundation laying several Classrooms block at Ambrose Alli University Secondary School.
- Construction of Eko Omijie Primary School.
- Construction of Ujoelen Primary School.

=== Security ===
- Ongoing Construction of Iruekpen Police Station.

== Award and Recognition ==
- Heroes of Violence Against Persons Prohibition Law Award for Championing the VAPP Law in Edo State, Awarded by WAMANIFESTO
- Episcopal Award of Excellence, Awarded by Anglican Diocese of Esan
- Awards for Role Models, Awarded by Ambrose Ali University
- Lifetime Achievement Award, Awarded by Effizie Magazine
- Award of Excellence, Awarded by Nigerian Bar Association
- Most Dependable Legislator of the year Award, Awarded by Edo Okpa Unity Forum
- Esan Hall of Fame Award 2021, awarded by Heroes Communication and Co.
- Excellence and Humility in Service Award, Awarded by Esan Policy Round Table

== Personal life ==
He is married and has children.
