= Nicholas Asonsere =

Nigerian politician and Member edo state house of assembly

Member of the Edo State House of Assembly
- Constituency: Ikpoba-Okha

Personal details
- Party: All Progressives Congress
- Other political affiliations: Peoples Democratic Party (until 2025)
- Occupation: Politician, lawmaker

Nicholas Asonsere (also known as Nicholas Friday Asonsere) is a Nigerian politician and member of the Edo State House of Assembly, representing the Ikpoba-Okha constituency.

== Political career ==
Asonsere was elected to the Edo State House of Assembly in 2023 to represent the Ikpoba-Okha constituency on the platform of the Peoples Democratic Party (PDP).

In 2025, Asonsere defected from the PDP to join the All Progressives Congress (APC).
