= Sisi Yemmie =

Nigerian YouTuber

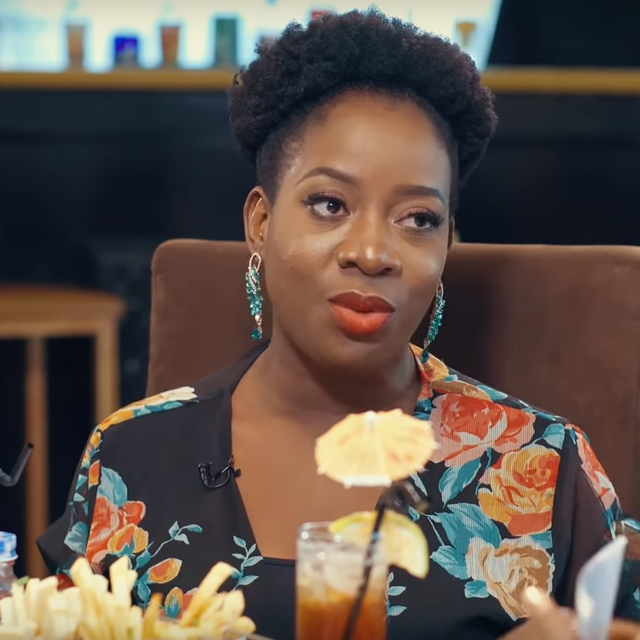
- Born: Yemisi Sophie Aiyedun; 1984 (age 41–42)
- Education: University of Birmingham; Igbinedion University
- Occupation: Blogger

YouTube information
- Channel: SisiYemmieTV
- Genres: Food; Lifestyle
- Subscribers: 1.1 million
- Views: 141 million
- Last updated: 23 Apr 2026

Yemisi Sophie Odusanya (born 1984), also known as Sisi Yemmie, is a Nigerian food and lifestyle blogger.

== Early life and education ==
Sisi Yemmie was born in 1984 and she grew up in Warri, Delta State. She is ethnic Yoruba. She earned a degree in Mass Communication from Igbinedion University, Okada and later got a master's degree in International Diplomacy from the University of Birmingham and a Diploma in Internal Communications from PR Academy, London.

== Career ==
Sisi Yemmie creates and shares food recipe videos that are created as a result of experiments carried out in her kitchen on her YouTube channel, SisiYemmieTV. She also shares content on parenting, relationships and lifestyle. In 2018, she was profiled by CNN Africa alongside Linda Ikeji and Chiamaka Obuekwe as "women who have struck social media gold". As at February 2019, she had 168,000 subscribers, 531 videos, and 18.4 million views on her YouTube channel. Her channel was described as "Brilliant" by Prince Charles during his visit to British Council in Lagos. She was listed as a top female Nigerian YouTuber in December 2020.

She served as the editorial lead on Cosmopolitan Nigeria.

== Personal life ==
She and her then fiancé, now husband, Yomi Odusanya won the first season of the My Big Nigerian Wedding reality show and had their wedding sponsored to the tune of ₦15 million. They have five children, having been delivered of a set of twins in mid 2024.

== Awards and nominations ==
Year	Award	Category	Result	Ref
2017	ELOY Awards	Female YouTuber	Won	
2015	City People Entertainment Awards	Blogger of the year	Won	
2014	ELOY Awards	Blogger of the year	Won	
