= Eric Okaka =

Nigerian politician and Member edo state house of assembly

Member of the Edo State House of Assembly
- Incumbent
- Assumed office 2023
- Constituency: Owan East

Personal details
- Born: April 14, 1970 (age 56) Edo State, Nigeria
- Party: All Progressives Congress
- Occupation: Politician

Eric Allison Afeikhe Okaka (born 14 April 1970) is a Nigerian politician currently serving as a member of the Edo State House of Assembly, representing the Owan East constituency.

== Early life ==
Okaka was born on 14 April 1970 in Edo State, Nigeria.

== Political career ==
Okaka is a member of the All Progressives Congress (APC). In the 2019 Edo State House of Assembly elections, he contested as the APC candidate for Owan East constituency and secured 21,240 votes, defeating other candidates to win the seat. He was subsequently re-elected during the 2023 general elections to represent the constituency in the 8th Assembly.

In the legislature, Okaka served as the Minority Leader of the Edo State House of Assembly.
