= Sunday Aghedo =

Nigerian politician and Member edo state house of assembly

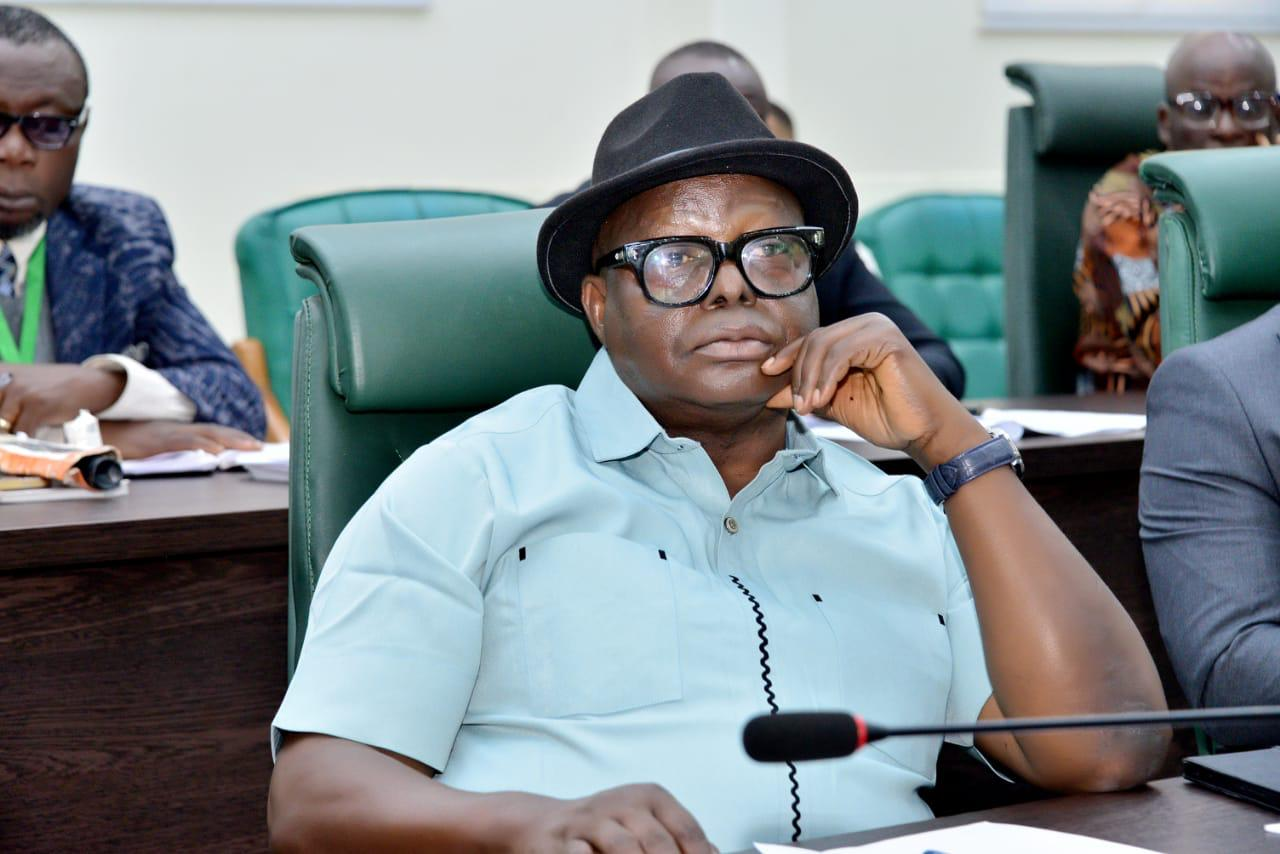

Member of the Edo State House of Assembly
- Incumbent
- Assumed office 2015
- Constituency: Ovia South-West

Personal details
- Born: Edo State, Nigeria
- Party: All Progressives Congress
- Occupation: Politician

Sunday Aghedo is a Nigerian politician and member of the Edo State House of Assembly, representing the Ovia South-West constituency under the platform of the All Progressives Congress (APC).

== Political career ==
Aghedo previously served as the Chief Whip of the Edo State House of Assembly.

In December 2017, following legal disputes regarding party primary nominations from the 2015 elections, the Supreme Court of Nigeria issued a ruling concerning the representation of the Ovia South-West state constituency seat and sack Sunday Aghedo.

Following the 2023 Edo State House of Assembly elections, election petitions were filed regarding the Ovia South-West constituency result. On 22 December 2023, the Court of Appeal sitting in Benin City, in suit CA/B/EP/SHA/ED/17/2023, affirmed Aghedo's election victory over Destiny Enabulele of the Peoples Democratic Party (PDP).

In February 2024, the Speaker of the Edo State House of Assembly, Blessing Agbebaku, administered the oath of office to Aghedo as the member representing Ovia South-West constituency.

In April 2026, Aghedo declared his intention to seek re-election for the Ovia South-West seat in the 2027 state assembly elections.

== See also ==
- Edo State House of Assembly
- All Progressives Congress
