= Richard Edosa =

Nigerian politician

Richard Osaro Edosa

Member of the Edo State House of Assembly
- Incumbent
- Assumed office 2023
- Constituency: Oredo West

Personal details
- Party: All Progressives Congress (2025–present)
- Other political affiliations: Labour Party (2023–2025)
- Occupation: Politician

Richard Osaro Edosa is a Nigerian politician serving as the member representing Oredo West Constituency in the Edo State House of Assembly. He was elected in the 2023 Edo State House of Assembly election on the platform of the Labour Party and later defected to the All Progressives Congress (APC) in 2025.

== Political career ==
Edosa contested the 2023 Edo State House of Assembly election as the Labour Party candidate for Oredo West Constituency. During the campaign, he rejected claims that the Labour Party did not have candidates for the election and urged voters to verify candidates through the Independent National Electoral Commission (INEC).

He was elected to represent Oredo West Constituency in the Edo State House of Assembly following the 2023 election.

In March 2025, Edosa and three other members of the Edo State House of Assembly defected to the All Progressives Congress. Speaking on behalf of the defecting lawmakers, he said divisions within their former parties influenced their decision and expressed support for Governor Monday Okpebholo's administration.

Following the defection, the APC became the majority party in the Edo State House of Assembly. The party nominated Edosa for the position of Deputy Chief Whip, but the nomination was later withdrawn after the House stated that it did not recognise the position.

== Legislative activities ==
Edosa serves as the Deputy Chief of Whip of the Edo State House of Assembly and as the Chairman of House Committee on Health.
