= Suleiman Isah =

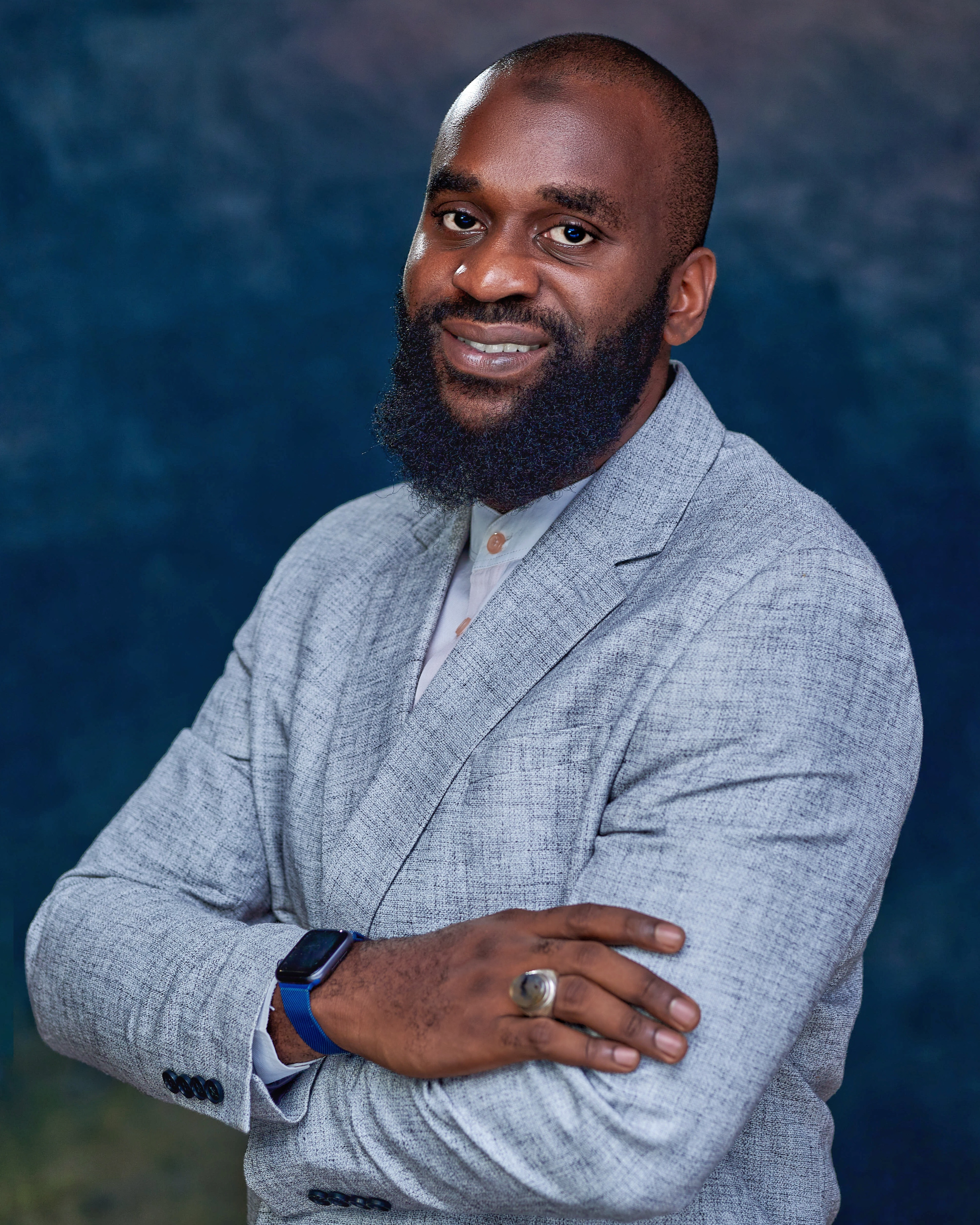
- Isah as Commissioner for Communications Technology and Digital Economy

Director-General of Niger State Information Technology and Digital Economy Agency (NSITDEA)
- Incumbent
- Assumed office 14 March 2026
- Preceded by: Office established

Commissioner for Communications Technology and Digital Economy, Niger State
- In office 16 August 2023 – 14 March 2026
- Succeeded by: Office restructured to NSITDEA
- Preceded by: Office established

Personal details
- Born: Suleiman Isah; 31 October 1986 (age 39) Minna, Niger State, Nigeria
- Education: Igbinedion University, Okada
- Occupation: Public administrator, technology professional

Suleiman Isah (born 31 October 1986) is a Nigerian technology expert and public administrator currently serving as the inaugural Director-General of Niger State Information Technology and Digital Economy Agency (NSITDEA) created by the administration of Governor Mohammed Bago in 2026. Isah previously served as first and only commissioner for the Ministry of Communications Technology and Digital Economy from 2023 to 2026 when the ministry transitioned into an autonomous statutory regulatory body NSITDEA. IT Edge News Africa named him one of Nigeria’s 50 Most Valuable Digital Economy Leaders in 2025.

== Background and education ==
Isah was born in Minna, Niger State. He earned a bachelor’s degree in Computer Science and Information Technology at the Igbinedion University, Nigeria and a master’s degree in Information Security and Digital Forensic at the University of East London.

== Career ==
Isah started his career as an intern at the First Bank of Nigeria offering system support, network administration and technology service delivery before joining the federal civil service. His career in the public service began at the National Hajj Commission of Nigeria before being transferred to National Primary Health Care Development Agency providing IT and system support.

In 2012, he joined the Federal Inland Revenue Service, FIRS (since renamed Nigeria Revenue Service, NRS) as an IT Officer and was later promoted as Technical Aide to the Head of Networks and Infrastructure managing WAN/SAN enterprise deployment across federal tax offices nationwide. He left FIRS to join Upper Niger River Basin Development Authority (UNRBDA) as Special Assistant Technical Matters to the Managing Director of the agency leading IT modernization.

Niger State information technology and digital economy

In 2023 Isah was appointed as Commissioner for Communications Technology and Digital Economy by Governor Mohammed Bago following the creation of the ministry to develop digital infrastructure for e-governance and digital economy. In 2024, his ministry’s policy for fast broadband development and connectivity led Niger State government to waive the Right-of-Way charge for fibre-optic network providers as an incentive. Same year, the ministry developed a framework that centralized the state’s IT infrastructure under the ministry to regulate, improve standard, security, and cut government spending on fragmented IT infrastructure across government ministries and agencies. The centralization was given legal effect with executive order No. 01, 2024. The unification led to the connection of 153 MDAs to high-speed broadband, introduction of electronic civil service recruitment, e-promotion exams and AI payroll oversight saving ₦500 million monthly.

In 2026, the Ministry of Communications Technology and Digital Economy of Niger State was restructured into a statutory organisation - Niger State Information Technology and Digital Economy Agency (NSITDEA) and Isah was appointed as its first Director-General.
