= Jonathan Aigbokhan Ibhamawu =

Nigerian politician

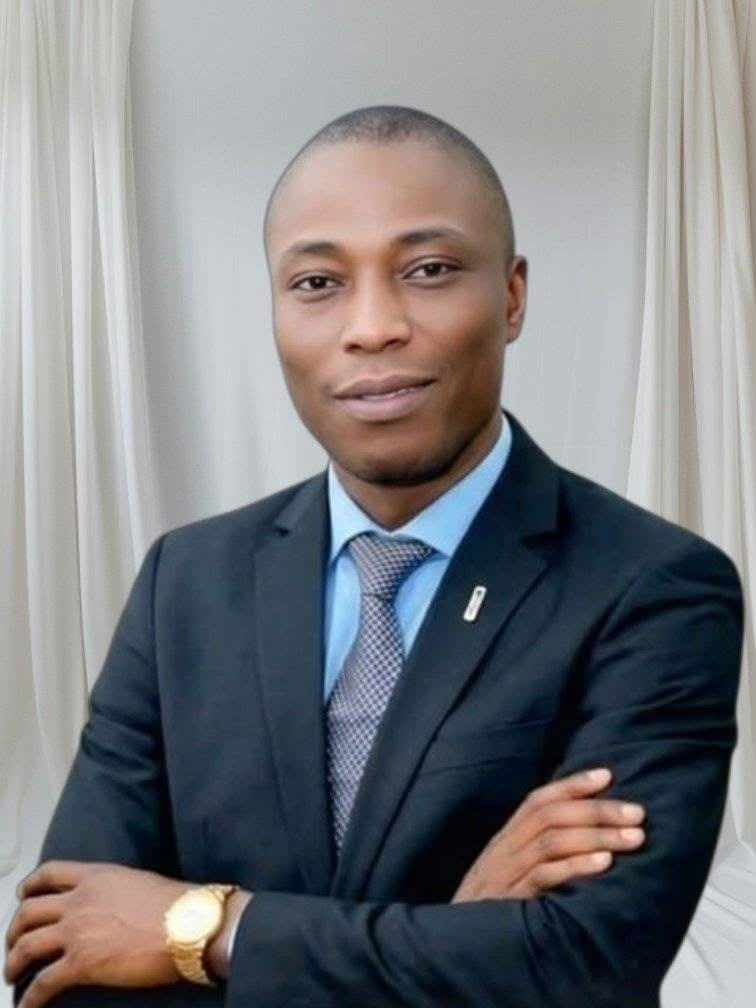

Member of the Edo State House of Assembly
- Incumbent
- Assumed office 2023
- Constituency: Esan West Constituency

Majority Leader of the Edo State House of Assembly
- Incumbent
- Assumed office 7 April 2025

Personal details
- Born: 10 July 1966 (age 60) Ekpoma, Edo State, Nigeria
- Party: All Progressives Congress
- Education: Ambrose Alli University
- Occupation: Politician

Jonathan Aigbokhan Ibhamawu (born 10 July 1966) is a Nigerian politician who serves as the majority leader of the eighth Edo State House of Assembly. He is a member of the All Progressives Congress representing the Esan West constituency.

== Early life and education ==
Aigbokhan was born and raised in Ekpoma, within the Esan West Local Government Area of Edo State, Nigeria, where he received his primary and secondary education. He studied accounting at Ambrose Alli University.

== Political career ==
Aigbokhan began his political career as the treasurer of the Esan West Local Government Council. He was reportedly awarded Best Local Government Staff in Nigeria in 2016.

In 2023, he contested and won the Edo State House of Assembly election under the All Progressives Congress to represent Esan West Constituency.

On 7 April 2025, he became the majority leader of the Edo State House of Assembly.
