= Sunday Fada Eigbiremonlen =

Nigerian politician and Member edo state house of assembly

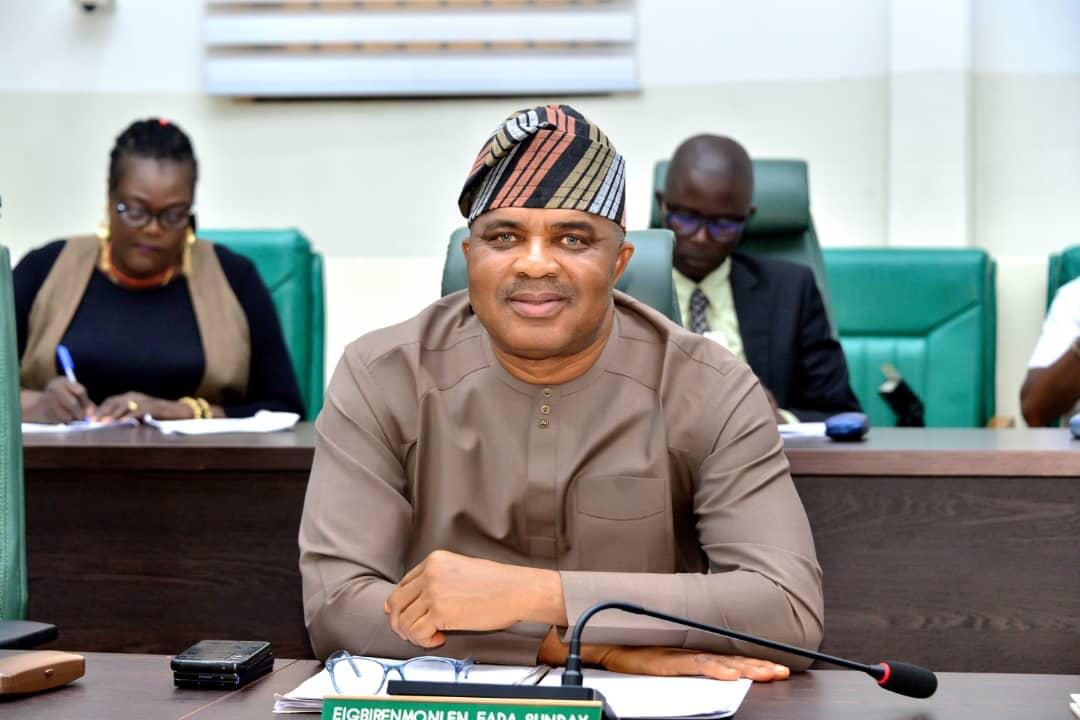
- Sunday Egbirenmonlen Fada

Member of the Edo State House of Assembly for Esan Central
- Incumbent
- Assumed office 13 June 2023
- Preceded by: Victor Sabor Edoror

Personal details
- Born: 18 May 1973 (age 53) Edo State, Nigeria
- Party: All Progressives Congress
- Other political affiliations: All Progressives Congress
- Occupation: Politician

Sunday Fada Eigbiremonlen is a Nigerian politician who currently serves as a member of the Edo State House of Assembly, representing the Esan Central constituency. He serves as Committee on Appropriation, Budget and Project Monitoring.

== Early life and background ==
Eigbiremonlen was born in Edo State, Nigeria.

== Political career ==
In the Nigerian House of Assembly elections held on 18 March 2023, Eigbiremonlen contested for the Esan Central constituency seat on the platform of the Peoples Democratic Party (PDP). He won the election, defeating candidates including Victor Sabor Edoror of the All Progressives Congress (APC).

He was sworn into the 8th Edo State House of Assembly in June 2023 alongside other elected lawmakers. During his tenure in the assembly, he has served on legislative committees focusing on state policy, infrastructure, and constituent services for Esan Central Local Government Area.
