= Yekini Idiaye =

Nigerian politician

Speaker of the Edo State House of Assembly
- Incumbent
- Assumed office 17 August 2026
- Deputy: Osamwonyi Evbaguehita Atu
- Preceded by: Blessing Agbebaku; Osamwonyi Evbaguehita Atu (acting)

Deputy Speaker of the Edo State House of Assembly
- In office June 2019 – August 2020

Personal details
- Born: Edo State, Nigeria
- Occupation: Politician

Yekini Idiaye is a Nigerian politician from Edo State, Nigeria.

== Political life ==
Yekini Idaiye served as the Deputy Speaker of the Edo State House of Assembly from June 2019 until he was impeached by the House in August 2020, and Roland Asoro, representing Orhionmwon II Constituency, was elected to replace him. Idiaye's impeachment followed his declaration of political support for the governorship candidate of the All Progressives Congress (APC) in the state.
