= Lawrence Ikechukwu Ezemonye =

Nigerian academic administrator

Vice chancellor of Igbinedion University, Okada
- Incumbent
- Assumed office 2018
- Preceded by: Eghosa E. Osaghae

Lawrence Ikechukwu Ezemonye is a Nigerian Professor of Ecotoxicology and Environmental Forensics. He assumed office as the Vice Chancellor of Igbinedion University, Okada in 2018. Prior to being appointed a Vice Chancellor, Ezemonye served as the Deputy Vice-Chancellor (Administration) at the University of Benin, Benin City.

== Background and early life ==
Ezemonye is a fellow of the Nigerian Environmental Society (FNES) and the first director of the National Centre for Energy and Environment of the Energy Commission of Nigeria. Ezemonye is admitted as Fellow of Nigerian Academy of Science.
