= Idia Renaissance =

Non-governmental organization in Edo State, Nigeria

- Formation: 1999; 27 years ago
- Founders: Mrs. Ekimwona (Eki) Igbinedion
- Type: NGO
- Purpose: Combat and prevent human trafficking
- Headquarters: Benin City, Nigeria
- Location: Nigeria
- Website: Official website

Idia Renaissance is a non governmental civil society organization based in Edo State, Nigeria. The organization organizes activities around human trafficking, including reception of victims of human trafficking. Idia Renaissance was founded by Mrs. Eki Igbinedion, wife of Chief Lucky Igbinedion, a former governor of Edo State. In 2021, Idia Renaissance partnered with the United Nations High Commissioner for Refugees (UNHCR) to spread awareness on human trafficking and sexual exploitation of women girls.

== History ==
Idia Renaissance was founded on 1 July 1999, in Benin City, the capital of Edo State, Nigeria, as a counter-measure to address the trafficking of persons for sexual exploitation.

== Partnership ==
The organization partner with the following organizations/institution to achieve its objectives:

- United Nations International Children's Emergency Fund (UNICEF)
- National Agency For The Prohibition Of Trafficking In Persons (NAPTIP)
- International Organization for Migration (IOM)
- Swedish International Development Agency (SIDA)
- United Nations Office on Crime and Drugs (UNOCD)
