= Eki Igbinedion =

First Lady of Edo State (1999–2007)

First Lady of Edo State
- 29 May 1999 – 29 May 2007

Personal details
- Born: 4 August 1959 (age 66) Benin City, Edo State
- Spouse: Lucky Igbinedion
- Parent(s): Pa Benjamin Norense and Mrs. Grace Iyonawan Oyemwense
- Education: Boston University

Eki Igbinedion (born 4 August 1959) is the former First Lady of Edo State and wife of Lucky Igbinedion, the Former Governor of Edo State. Igbinedion founded Idia Renaissance, a non governmental civil society organization based in Edo State, with the aim of combating human trafficking, including reception of victims of human trafficking.

== Early life and education ==
Igbinedion was born into the royal family of Prince and Princess Oyemarense in Benin City, the capital of Edo State. She attended Boston University in the United States of America where she obtained a bachelor's degree in economics.

== Pet projects ==
As the First Lady of Edo State, Igbinedion undertook some pet projects to help the less privileged and also help solve some societal problems in the state. In 1999, she established the Idia Renaissance to help address the issue of sex and human trafficking in Edo State. She also founded the Edo Underprivileged Children Scholarship Trust Funds with the goal of providing scholarships to the less privilege in the state.
