= Edo State House of Assembly =

Legislative arm of Edo State, Nigeria

- 8th Edo State House of Assembly

Type
- Type: Unicameral

History
- Founded: 1999

Leadership
- Speaker: Yekini Idiaye, APC since 17 August 2026
- Deputy Speaker: Osamwonyi Evbaguehita Atu, APC since 19 May 2025
- Chief Whip: Hussein Lecky, APC since 7 April 2025
- Majority Leader: Osezua Sunday Ojiezele, APC since 17 August 2026
- Minority Leader: Charity Aiguobarueghian, NDC since 7 April 2025

Structure
- Seats: 24
- Political groups: Government (22): APC (22); Opposition (2): NDC (2)
- Length of term: 4 years
- Authority: Chapter V, Constitution of Nigeria

Elections
- Last election: 18 March 2023
- Next election: 6 February 2027

Meeting place
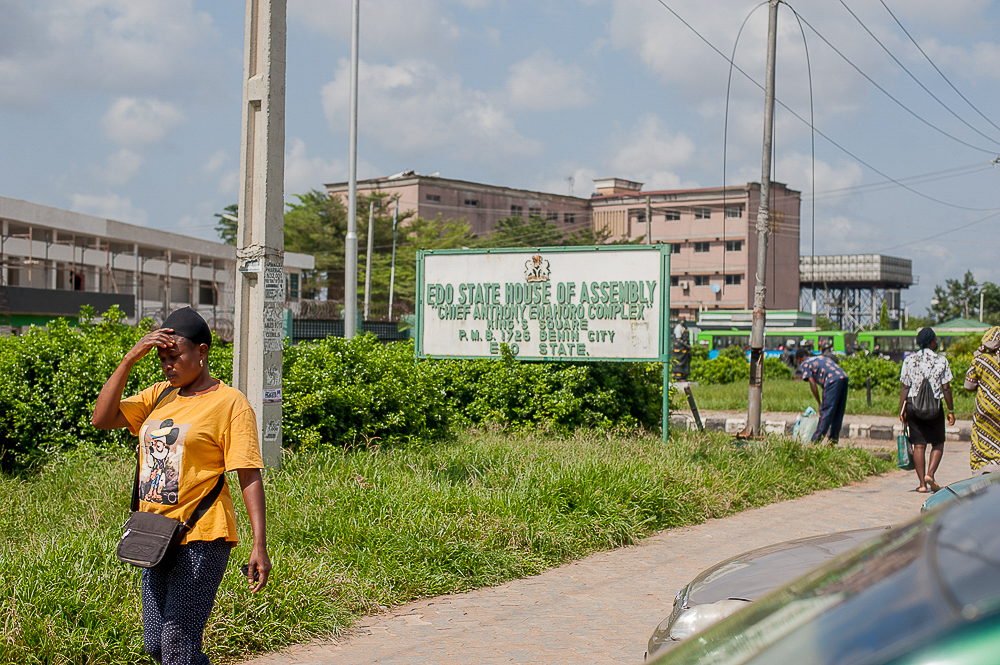
- Chief Anthony Enahoro Complex; Benin City, Edo

Website
- https://edostate.gov.ng/

The Edo State House of Assembly is the unicameral legislature of the Nigerian state of Edo. Chapter V, Part II of the Constitution of Nigeria, adopted in 1999, defines the role of the House of Assembly. The House of Assembly is composed of 24 members, each elected from single-member constituencies across the 18 local government areas of the state.

Currently, the All Progressives Congress (APC) holds a majority in the Assembly with 22 seats.The Nigeria Democratic Congress (NDC) are in the minority with 2 seats.

== Members ==
8th Edo State House of Assembly (2023-2027)
LGA	Constituency	Name	Elected under	Current party
Akoko Edo	Akoko Edo I	Yekini Idiaye	PDP	APC
Akoko Edo	Akoko Edo II	Donald Okogbe	PDP	APC
Egor	Egor	Natasha Osawaru	PDP	NDC
Esan Central	Esan Central	Sunday Fada Eigbiremonlen	PDP	APC
Esan North-East	Esan North-East I	Addeh Isibor	APC	
Esan North-East	Esan North-East II	Maria Edeko	PDP	APC
Esan South-East	Esan South-East	Osezua Sunday Ojiezele	PDP	APC
Esan West	Esan West	Jonathan Aigbokhan	APC	
Etsako Central	Etsako Central	Ahmed Oshomah	APC	
Etsako East	Etsako East	Kingsley Ugabi	APC	
Etsako West	Etsako West I	Mustapha Hussein Lecky	APC	
Etsako West	Etsako West II	Gani Akokhia	APC	
Igueben	Igueben	Ojie Inegbeboh	PDP	APC
Ikpoba Okha	Ikpoba Okha	Nicholas Asonsere	PDP	APC
Oredo	Oredo East	Omosigho Uyi Frank	PDP	APC
Oredo	Oredo West	Richard Edosa	LP	APC
Orhionmwon	Orhionmwon I	Osamwonyi Evbaguehita Atu	PDP	APC
Orhionmwon	Orhionmwon II	Bright Iyamu	PDP	APC
Ovia North-East	Ovia North-East I	Charity Aiguobarueghian	PDP	NDC
Ovia North-East	Ovia North-East	Andrew Uzamere	PDP	APC
Ovia South-West	Ovia South-West	Sunday Aghedo	APC	
Owan East	Owan East	Eric Okaka	APC	
Owan West	Owan West	Blessing Agbebaku	PDP	APC
Uhunmwonde	Uhunmwonde	Kaycee Osamwonyi	PDP	APC
