= Robert Okojie =

Nigerian-American engineer

Robert Sola Okojie is a Nigerian-American electrical engineer and inventor. He is a senior researcher at the NASA Glenn Research Center, where he has developed silicon carbide-based microelectromechanical systems (MEMS) and sensors for use in extreme environments. In 2020, he was inducted into the NASA Inventors Hall of Fame in recognition of his inventions and contributions to aerospace engineering.

== Early life and education ==
Okojie was born in Barkin Ladi, Plateau State, Nigeria. He attended Ibadan Boys High School before moving to the United States to pursue higher education. He earned bachelor's, master's and doctoral degrees in electrical engineering from the New Jersey Institute of Technology.

== Career ==
Okojie joined the silicon carbide research group at NASA's Glenn Research Center in Cleveland in 1999. He holds over 20 patents relating to high-temperature devices, including several licenses for commercial use that could reduce spacecraft weight, and thereby launch cost and fuel consumption, while leaving additional space for scientific payloads.

He demonstrated the world's first thermally stable ohmic contact metallization on silicon carbide at record-breaking temperatures for extended periods of time. Paving way for high temperature sensors and electronics at these temperatures that can substantially improve safety and efficiency, as well as directly impacting the air quality around airports.

== Awards and recognitions ==
Okojie has received accolades, including in 2009 the NASA Abe Silverstein Medal for Research and in 2012 the Glenn Research Distinguished Publication Award. Scientist of the Year by the National Technical Association for advancing the state-of-the-art of MEMS for use in harsh environments and in 2007 was a recipient of the Cleveland Executive Board Wings of Excellence award.

On November 22, 2020, he was inducted into NASA Inventors Hall of Fame, making him the 35th recipient of the prestigious honor and just the fourth African Black person to be inducted.
