= Kingsley Ugabi =

Nigerian politician

Member of the Edo State House of Assembly
- Incumbent
- Assumed office 2019
- Constituency: Etsako East

Personal details
- Born: Kingsley Oghenakhogie Ugabi; April 15, 1974 (age 52) Edo State, Nigeria
- Party: All Progressives Congress
- Occupation: Politician

Kingsley Oghenakhogie Ugabi (born 15 April 1974) is a Nigerian politician representing the Etsako East constituency in the Edo State House of Assembly. He is a member of the All Progressives Congress (APC).

== Political career ==
In the 2019 Nigerian general election, Ugabi won election to the Edo State House of Assembly for Etsako East under the platform of the All Progressives Congress (APC). He was re-elected to the state assembly in 2023.
