= Igbinedion University =

Private university in Edo State, Nigeria

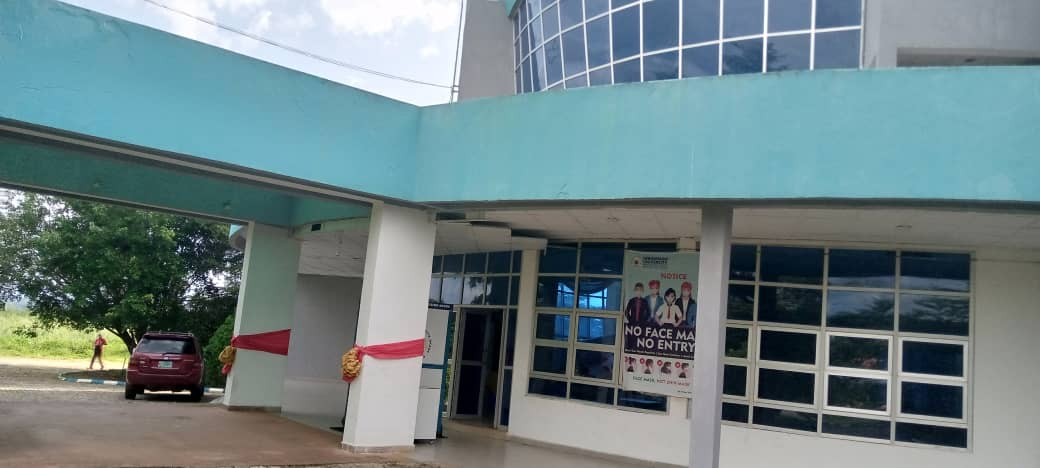
- University library entrance
- Motto: Knowledge & Excellence
- Type: Private
- Established: 10 May 1999
- Chancellor: Gabriel Igbinedion
- Vice-Chancellor: Professor Lawrence Ikechukwu Ezemonye
- Location: Okada, Edo State, Nigeria; 6°43′49″N 5°23′45″E
- Campus: Urban
- Website: www.iuokada.edu.ng

Igbinedion University (IUO) is a private university in Okada, Edo State, Nigeria. It was founded on 10 May 1999 by Gabriel Igbinedion. It is reputed as the first private university in Nigeria

== History ==
Igbinedion University was founded on 10 May 1999 and began admission on 15 October 1999. The founder is Gabriel Igbinedion.

== Academic accreditation ==
The university's programs, both at the graduate and undergraduate levels, have received accreditation from the National Universities Commission (NUC). Additionally, the university's programs align with the requirements set forth by relevant professional bodies.

== Colleges and academic offerings ==
Igbinedion University comprises seven distinct faculties, each catering to specific academic disciplines:

- Oba Erediauwa College of Law
- Alayeluwa Oba Okunade Sijuwade College of Health Sciences
- Oba Adeyeye Enitan Ogunwusi Ojaja II College of Natural and Applied Sciences
- Sanusi Lamido Sanusi College of Business and Management Studies
- Prof. Dora Akunyili College of Pharmacy
- General Abdulsalami A. Abubakar College of Engineering
- Goodluck Ebele Jonathan College of Arts and Social Sciences.
- All courses at Igbinedion University Okada are conducted in English Language.

Source —

== Leadership and governance ==
The late Professor Anthony Uyekpen Osagie served as the inaugural vice-chancellor from 29 October 1999 to 30 November 2003. Professor Nduka Uraih, who held the position of Deputy Vice Chancellor, subsequently assumed the role of acting Vice Chancellor from December 2003 to 11 September 2004. Notably, Rev. Professor Eghosa Osaghae assumed the position of the second substantive vice chancellor, a role he held until June 2018 when Prof. Lawrence Ezemwonye became the V.C.

== Academic programs ==
=== Faculty and departments ===
College Of Health Sciences

- Medicine and Surgery
- Medical Laboratory Science
- Anatomy
- Physiology
- Nursing Science

College of Pharmacy

- Pharmacology and Toxicology
- Medicinal chemistry|Pharmaceutical Chemistry
- Clinical pharmacy|Clinical Pharmacy and Pharmacy|Pharmacy Practice
- Pharmaceutics and Pharmaceutics|Pharmaceutical Technology
- Pharmaceutical microbiology|Pharmaceutical Microbiology
- Pharmacognosy

College Of Engineering

- Chemical/Petroleum Engineering.
- Civil engineering|Civil Engineering.
- Electrical/Electronics and Computer.
- Mechanical engineering|Mechanical Engineering.

College of Arts and Social Sciences

- Economics and Development Studies
- Geography, Urban and Regional Planning
- Mass communication|Mass Communication
- Political science|Political Science and public administration|Public Administration
- Sociology and Anthropology
- International Relations and Strategic Studies
- Theatre Arts
- English

College Of Natural and Applied Sciences

- Computer science and Information Technology|Computer Science and Information Technology
- Biochemistry
- Microbiology
- Industrial Chemistry.
- Physics.

College Of Business and Management Studies

- Accounting
- Banking and Finance
- Business Administration

College Of Law

- Law

== Reputation ==
Over 10,000 people have graduated from various undergraduate and postgraduate programs at the university. Since its establishment in 1999, it has worked for prominent firms both within and outside of Nigeria. It has also received support from people and organizations such as the Central Bank of Nigeria, which funded the creation of an ultra-modern library for the school, and former Chief of Air Staff Air Marshal Paul Dike, who donated a complex.

== Notable alumni ==
- Agboola Ajayi
- Regina Daniels
- Ibrahim Hassan Dankwambo, Governor Gombe State.
- Suleiman Isah, Nigerian public administrator and technology professional.
- Kingsley Kuku, Former National Adviser, Niger Delta Affairs.
- Professor Damilola Sunday Olawuyi, Senior Advocate of Nigeria and Vice Chair of the International Law Association
- Anita Ukah
- Sisi Yemmie, YouTuber and blogger.
