= Oredo =

- LGA
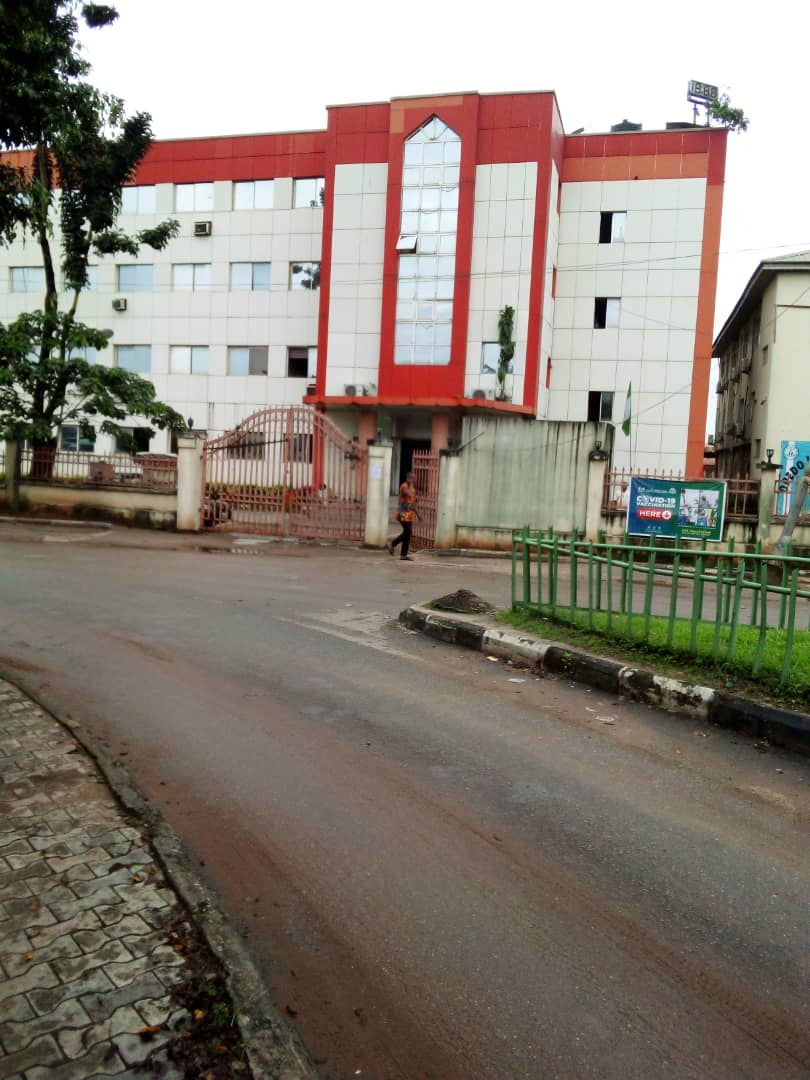
- Oredo Local Government Area Secretariat
- Motto: Oredo the greatest
- Interactive map of Oredo
- Country: Nigeria
- State: Edo State
- Capital: Benin City

Government
  - Type: Democracy

Area
  - Total: 249 km^{2} (96 sq mi)

Population (2006)
  - Total: 374,671
  - Density: 1,500/km^{2} (3,900/sq mi)
- Time zone: UTC+1 (WAT)
- Postal code: 300

Oredo is a Local Government Area of Edo State, Nigeria. Its headquarter is in Benin City, which is also the capital city of Edo State. Benin City is also the capital city of the Benin Empire. The Oba of Benin, Omo N'Oba Ewuare II's palace is located here. There are four major markets in Oredo Local Government Area; Oba market, New Benin market, New market and Ekiosa market.

Residents include the Oba of Benin, Omo N'Oba N'Edo Uku Akpolokpolo Oba Ewuare II and Gabriel Osawaru Igbinedion, the Esama Of Benin Kingdom.

== Geography ==
It has an area of 249 km^{2} (96 sq mi) and a population of 374,671 at the 2006 census. The postal code of the area is 300.

== Oredo Marriage Registry ==
The Oredo marriage registry is located at Ring Road in Benin City. The registry is used for the legal joining of couples.
