= Ovia North-East =

- LGA
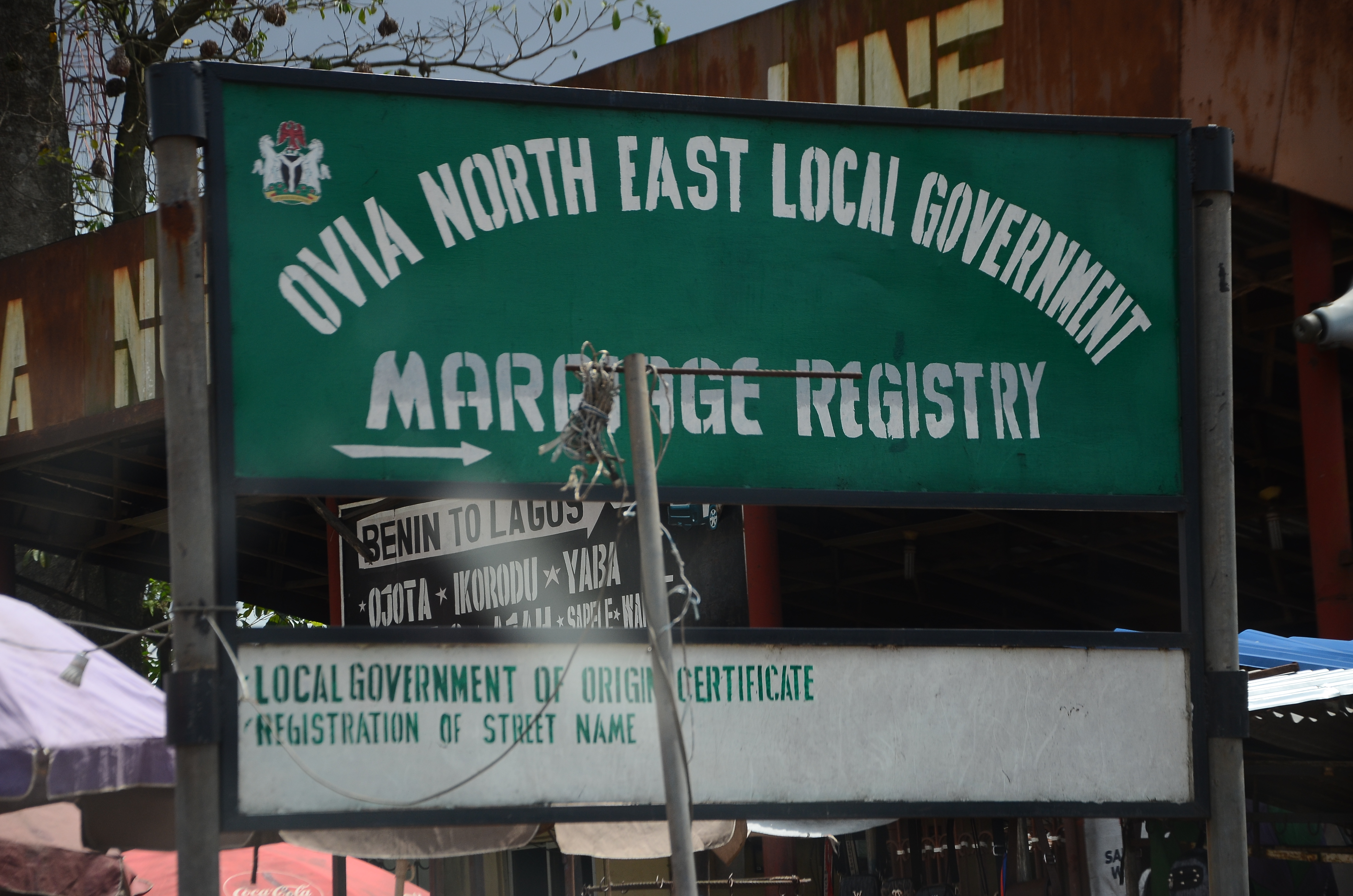
- Nickname: ovia
- Interactive map of Ovia North-East
- Country: Nigeria
- State: Edo State
- Capital: Okada
- Boroughs: Ovia North-East I; Ovia North-East II

Area
  - Total: 2,301 km^{2} (888 sq mi)

Population (2006)
  - Total: 153,849
  - Density: 66.86/km^{2} (173.2/sq mi)
- Time zone: UTC+1 (WAT)
- Postal code: 302

Ovia North-East is a Local Government Area of Edo State, Nigeria. Its headquarters are in the town of Okada. The local government area is one of the two in Edo state named after the Ovia or Osse river which passes through its territory, the other being Ovia South-West.

It had an area of 2,301 km^{2} and a population of 153,849 at the 2006 census. The major communities in the LGA are Okada, Uhen, Utese, Okokhuo, Uhiere, Isiuwa, Ekiadolor, Oluku, Iguoshodin, Utoka, Oghede, Egbeta, Ora, and Ogbese.

The major university in Ovia North-East is Igbinedion University, Okada. There are 174 secondary schools in Ovia North-East.

Saw milling is a prominent economic activity in Ovia North-East.

The postal code of the area is 302.

Okada is a town in Ovia North-East. Ovia North-East has 13 electoral wards. Agho-Ozomu is a community in Oghede ward and the 17th polling unit in the INEC 2021 database.

== Educational institutions in Ovia North-East ==
University of Benin, Benin city: University of Benin is a federal university located in Ovia North-East local government area.

Igbinedion University, Okada: Igbinedion University is the first private university in Edo state and it is located at Ovia North-East local government area.
