= Gabriel Igbinedion =

Nigerian businessman and philanthropist (born 1934)

Gabriel Osawaru Igbinedion
- Born: 11 September 1934 (age 92); Edo state, Nigeria
- Occupations: Businessman, philanthropist
- Known for: Founding igbinedion University
- Spouse: Lady Cherry Igbinedion
- Website: igbinedion.net

Chief Gabriel Osawaru Igbinedion (born 11 September 1934) is a Nigerian businessman and philanthropist, who is the founder of Igbinedion University, a private university in Nigeria. He is renowned for his contributions to education, business, and philanthropy in Nigeria.

Igbinedion is a traditional aristocrat from Okada town in Edo State and holds the chieftaincy title of the Esama of the Benin Kingdom.

== Esama of Benin ==
The title Esama traditionally means the "son of the people", with responsibilities including assisting the poor in medial, monetary and private venture forms. He was suspended from participating in palace activities in 2008.

It is on record that the Oba of Benin did not declare Igbinedion as an enemy as it was widely circulated. On 13 June 2012 a palace press release informed the general public that the suspension placed on Igbinedion had been lifted. This was an affirmation that Igbinedion is still the Esama of Benin Kingdom.

== Career ==
Igbinedion's business empire includes an international property portfolio and a private TV and radio station, called Independent Radio and Television, a private university, Igbinedion University, the first private university in Nigeria, located in Okada town, and a large number of hotels. He previously owned the now-defunct private airline, Okada Air, of over 40 aircraft (planes and helicopters). He has built numerous churches including a Grand Catholic Cathedral, and has set up and owns a number of private hospitals across Nigeria.

== Personal life ==
Igbinedion is married to Lady Cherry. His children include a son, Lucky Igbinedion who was two-term Governor of Edo State, another son, Charles, was a Local Government chairman and one time Commissioner of Education, and a third one, Peter, who was the managing director of the Nigerian Aviation Authority. His daughter, Omosede Igbinedion, is a former member of the House of Representatives (Nigeria) as a representative of Ovia Federal Constituency in Edo State. In addition to these four, Igbinedion also has a number of other children.
