= Esan North-East =

- LGA
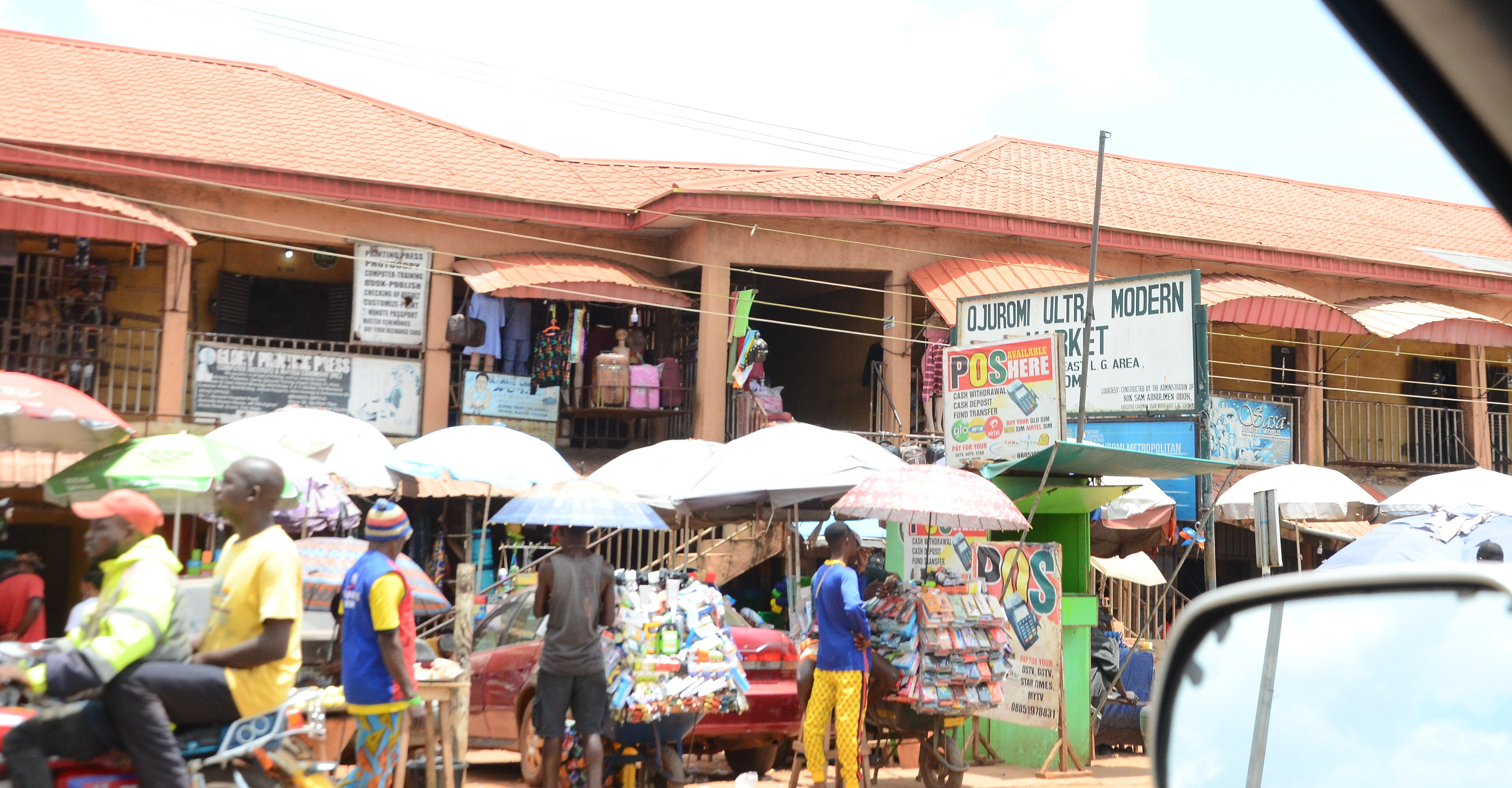
- Uromi Main Market
- Interactive map of Esan North-East
- Location within Nigeria
- Country: Nigeria
- State: Edo State
- Capital: Uromi

Area
  - Total: 338 km^{2} (131 sq mi)

Population (2006)
  - Total: 119,346
  - Density: 472.8/km^{2} (1,225/sq mi)
- Population density from 2016 recorded in sq km and sq mi
- Time zone: UTC+1 (WAT)

Esan North-East is a Local Government Area located in Edo State of Nigeria. It has an estimated population of 119,346. Its headquarters are in Uromi/Uzea.

It has an area of 338 km^{2} (131 sq mi) and a population density of 472.8 inhabitants per square kilometre (1,225/sq mi) (2016).

== Geography ==
Esan North-East is bordered with Atani by Ubiaja, Ebhoiyi by Igueben, Ivue and Obeidu by Irrua, Uzea by Afemai, Amendokhian by Ugboha with towns in all its surroundings. The following villages constitute the city of Uromi, which is the headquarters of Esan North East local government area of Edo State Obeidu, Ivue, Egbele, Unuwazi, Utako, Onewa, Awo, Uzea, Eror, Idumoza, Ebhoijie, Arue, Ubierumu-Oke, Ebue, Ewoyi, Odigwele, Eguare, Oyomon, Eko-Ibadin, Efandion, Atani, Ualor-Oke, Amedokhian, Ukoni, Ewoki, and Ebun. Some of the original villages like Obeidu, Ewoyi, Ivue and Uzea have grown slowly into emerging suburban towns within the Uromi axis.

== Economic mainstays ==
The economic mainstay of Esan Northeast includes but not limited to the Commerce, cottage industry, agriculture, furniture making, and wood processing. Major agricultural products are Cassava, rice, yams, maize, tomatoes, okra, melon, cocoyam, and rubber. Natural resources include rubber, kaolin, and timber. The major tourist centre is the Onojie’s ancient palace.

=== Climate Condition ===
Esan North Local Government has a tropical wet and dry climates. The wind in the North East causes reduction in Rainfall which can result in little or no rain as the rainfall significantly reduces by mid-October and the period of dry season gradually sets in.

=== Health facilities ===
General hospital, clinics, and maternity homes.

=== Educational institutions ===
There are 15 secondary schools and 35 private primary schools. Among these schools are the Our Ladies of Lourd, Girls College, and Onewa Technical College.

== Constituency structure ==
The North-East Local Government Area is divided into two constituencies. Constituency 1 comprises Wards 1, 2, 3, 4, and 5, while constituency 2 comprises Wards 6, 7, 8, 9, and 10, making a total of 10 political wards represented by two representatives in the Edo State House of Assembly.

== Notable people ==
Esan North-East has produced well-known individuals who are popular in both state and national level. These include:

- Chief Anthony Enahoro - one of Nigeria's foremost anti-colonial and pro-democracy activists
- Archbishop Patrick Ebosele Ekpu
- Cardinal Anthony Olubunmi Okogie
- High Chief, Tony Anenih (Iyasele of Esanland), leader of the ruling PDP.
- Air Vice Marshal Anthony Ebehijele Okpere
- Ehia Olu. Akhabue
- Pastor Raymond Okpere
- Professor Mike Obadan
- Professor E. Okoeguale.
- Architect Mike Onolemhenmhen (former Minister Of Works)
- Flourish Itulua-Abumere is a Nigerian-Canadian sociologist, social theorist, research scholar, policy strategist, and human resources executive based in Nova Scotia. Her work focuses on gender studies, masculinity studies, ethics, the sociology of work, organizational policy, and institutional governance.. Abumere is the author of Chapter 10, “Artificial Intelligence and the Reinforcement of Masculinity,” in Men and Masculinities at the Margins: Decolonial and Intersectional Approaches, forthcoming from Routledge / Taylor & Francis in September 2026, among many others. Her research examines the relationship between gender, power, labour, technology, and social institutions, with particular attention to masculinity, workplace culture, and social change.. She has also been associated with the Peoples Democratic Party (Nigeria). Itulua-Abumere also serves as Executive Director of the International Fusion Centre for Business and Education (IFCBE), Director of Human Resources and Policy at Glooscap First Nation, and Director at Glooscap Ventures. She is also the founder of Flourixh Advisory and Supply Co. Her professional work includes human resources leadership, policy development, workforce planning, organizational governance, and institutional strategy.
- Dr. Joseph Itotoh (Former Minister for State, Internal Affairs)
- Mathew Okpebholo - businessman
- Dr. Robert S. Okojie (research scientist, NASA)

== Religion ==
The people of Esan North-East include Christians, Muslims and African traditionalists. Before the Europeans, there existed some of the oldest examples in Africa of African traditional religion.

In 1908, Christianity came to Uromi in Esan North-East through the evangelism of a Roman Catholic priest, Rev. Fr. Joseph Corbeau, a European missionary who was residing then at Ubiaja (seat of Esan-South-East Local Government Area). The people of Uromi, in support of the traditional monarch Ogbidi Okojie, accepted the new religion and after a period of catechetical instruction and evangelism, built a church on land donated by the monarch and his council of Chiefs. Catholicism is one of the main branches of Christianity at Uromi. St. Anthony's Cathedral, located along the busy Mission road, is the seat of the Catholic Bishop of Uromi Diocese.

== See also ==
- Esan people
- Local Government Areas of Nigeria
