= 2023 Nigerian Senate elections in Edo State =

2023 Senate elections in Edo

2019 Nigerian Senate elections in Edo State
- 25 February 2023

All 3 Edo State seats in the Senate of Nigeria
	Majority party	Minority party
Party	PDP	APC
Last election	2	1
Seats before	3	0

The 2023 Nigerian Senate elections in Edo State will be held on 25 February 2023, to elect the 3 federal Senators from Edo State, one from each of the state's three senatorial districts. The elections will coincide with the 2023 presidential election, as well as other elections to the Senate and elections to the House of Representatives; with state elections being held two weeks later. Primaries were held between 4 April and 9 June 2022.

== Background ==
In terms of the previous Senate elections, all three incumbent senators were re-elected: Clifford Ordia (PDP) held his seat with 53% of the vote in the Central district, Francis Alimikhena (APC) won with 59% in the North district, and Matthew Urhoghide was returned with 51% in the South district. These results were a showcase of Edo State's electoral competitiveness as the APC won slightly more House of Representatives seats than the PDP and a sizeable APC majority was elected to the House of Assembly but PDP nominee Atiku Abubakar narrowly carried the state in the presidential election. Over a year after the senatorial elections was the state's gubernatorial election where incumbent Governor Godwin Obaseki (APC-turned-PDP) was re-elected under the banner of his new party.

Later in the term, Ordia and Urhoghide sided with Obaseki in the battle over control of the Edo PDP and took part in his faction's primaries for 2023. Alimikhena left the APC in May 2022 and joined the PDP, also siding with the Obaseki-aligned faction.

== Overview ==
Affiliation	Party			Total
Affiliation	PDP	APC	LP	Total
Previous Election	2	1	0	3
Before Election	3	0	0	3
After Election	0	2	1	3

== Summary ==
District	Incumbent		Results	
District	Incumbent	Party	Status	Candidates
Edo Central	Clifford Ordia	PDP	Incumbent lost re-election New member elected APC gain	▌ ✓ Monday Okpebholo (APC); ▌Clifford Ordia (PDP)
Edo North	Francis Alimikhena	PDP (Note: This senator was elected as a member of the APC but switched to the PDP during their term.)	Incumbent withdrew from primary (Note: Senator defected to new party after withdrawing from or losing their former party's primary.); Incumbent lost re-election under nomination of new party New member elected APC gain	▌ ✓ Adams Oshiomhole (APC); ▌Francis Alimikhena
Edo South	Matthew Urhoghide	PDP	Incumbent lost renomination New member elected LP gain	▌Valentine Asuen (APC); ▌ ✓ Neda Imasuen (LP); ▌Matthew Iduoriyekemwen (PDP)

== Edo Central ==
2023 Edo Central Senatorial District election
- 25 February 2023
Nominee	Monday Okpebholo	Clifford Ordia
Party	APC	PDP
Senator before election
Clifford Ordia
PDP
Elected Senator
Monday Okpebholo
APC

The Edo Central Senatorial District covers the local government areas of Esan Central, Esan North-East, Esan South-East, Esan West, and Igueben; it largely corresponds with the Esan cultural area of Esanland. The incumbent Clifford Ordia (PDP), who was re-elected with 52.9% of the vote in 2019, is seeking re-election.

=== Primary elections ===
==== All Progressives Congress ====
On 20 April 2022, the APC National Executive Committee announced the party's schedule for senatorial primaries, setting its expression of interest form price at ₦3 million and nomination form price at ₦17 million with a 50% discount for candidates younger than 40 while women and candidates with disabilities get free nomination forms. Forms were to be sold from 26 April to 6 May until the deadline was later extended to 10 May then 12 May. After the submission of nomination forms by 13 May, candidates were screened by a party committee on 14 and 15 May while 18 May was the date for the screening appeal process. Ward congresses and LGA congresses were set for 16 and 17 May to elect delegates for the primary. Candidates approved by the screening process advanced to a primary set for 27 May, in concurrence with other APC senatorial primaries; challenges to the result could be made on 28 May.

On the primary date, Monday Okpebholo was the sole candidate and was nominated unopposed.

==== People's Democratic Party ====
On 16 March 2022, the national PDP announced its senatorial primary timetable, setting its expression of interest form price at ₦1 million and the nomination form price at ₦20 million with a 50% discount for candidates between 25 and 30. Forms were to be sold until 1 April but the party later extended the deadline four times before reaching a final deadline of 22 April. After the submission of nomination forms by 25 April, candidates were screened by a party committee on 27 April while 2 May was the rescheduled date for the screening appeal process. Ward congresses were set for 29 April and LGA congresses were rescheduled for 10 May to elect delegates for the primary. Candidates approved by the screening process advanced to a primary set for 23 May, in concurrence with other PDP senatorial primaries but due to often violently enforced Monday stay-at-home orders by separatists, southeastern state parties held their primaries on 24 May; challenges to the result could be made on 25 May.

In the year before the primaries, the Edo State PDP split between two factions: one group led by incumbent Governor Godwin Obaseki and his allies who joined the PDP with him in 2020 with a rival bloc led by the national PDP South-South Deputy National Vice-Chairman Dan Orbih and longtime party members. The dispute escalated in late 2021 when the Obaseki-aligned state PDP leadership attempted to suspend Orbih's membership and the two factions held separate party congresses. Despite a court order that recognised the Orbih faction a few days before the primary date, both factions held separate primaries with longtime party members mainly winning the Orbih factional primaries and recent defectors mainly winning the Obaseki factional primaries.

In the Orbih-aligned factional primary, former Minister of Works Mike Onolememen emerged victorious over former MHR Friday Obomezele Itulah by a large margin. In the Obaseki-aligned factional primary, Ordia also defeated Itulah in a landslide. In INEC's final list of nominees in September, the Orbih faction's nominees were recognized due to the previous court order; however, Federal High Court promptly ordered the recognition of the Obaseki faction's nominees before the Supreme Court dismissed an appeal by Orbih's faction. However, it was not until 2 February 2023 that the apex court definitively ruled on the matter, again siding with the Obaseki faction.

Orbih-aligned primary results

PDP Orbih-aligned primary results
Party	Candidate	Votes	%
PDP	Mike Onolememen	123	87.86%
PDP	Friday Obomezele Itulah	17	12.14%
PDP	Other candidates	0	0.00%
Total votes		140	100.00%

PDP Obaseki-aligned primary results
Party	Candidate	Votes	%
PDP	Clifford Ordia	148	99.33%
PDP	Friday Obomezele Itulah	1	0.67%
PDP	Other candidates	0	0.00%
Total votes		149	100.00%

=== Campaign ===
By the start of the official campaign period in October, Okpebholo supporters began to use the PDP crisis to campaign with claims that the ongoing litigation could deprive the district of representation if the PDP won the seat but litigation continued.

=== General election ===
==== Results ====
2023 Edo Central Senatorial District election
Party	Candidate	Votes	%
A	Alex Ehi Aidaghese		
AA	Saint Lovinson Anenih		
ADP	Iboi Lucky Emmanuel		
ADC	Odion Kennedy Osas		
APC	Monday Okpebholo		
LP	Oseremen Christ Omofoma		
New Nigeria Peoples Party	Okoduwa Akhigbe		
PDP	Clifford Ordia		
SDP	Sebastian Iyere		
ZLP	Mercy Ogeide		
Total votes			100.00%
Invalid or blank votes			N/A
Turnout			

== Edo North ==
2023 Edo North Senatorial District election
- 25 February 2023
Nominee	Adams Oshiomhole	Francis Alimikhena
Party	APC	PDP
Senator before election
Francis Alimikhena
PDP
Elected Senator
Adams Oshiomhole
APC

The Edo North Senatorial District covers the local government areas of Akoko Edo, Etsako Central, Etsako East, Etsako West, Owan East, and Owan West. The incumbent Francis Alimikhena (PDP) was re-elected with 59.0% of the vote in 2019 as a member of the APC; he initially sought renomination in the APC before withdrawing from the primary and defecting to win the PDP nomination in June 2022.

=== Primary elections ===
==== All Progressives Congress ====
On 20 April 2022, the APC National Executive Committee announced the party's schedule for senatorial primaries, setting its expression of interest form price at ₦3 million and nomination form price at ₦17 million with a 50% discount for candidates younger than 40 while women and candidates with disabilities get free nomination forms. Forms were to be sold from 26 April to 6 May until the deadline was later extended to 10 May then 12 May. After the submission of nomination forms by 13 May, candidates were screened by a party committee on 14 and 15 May while 18 May was the date for the screening appeal process. Ward congresses and LGA congresses were set for 16 and 17 May to elect delegates for the primary. Candidates approved by the screening process advanced to a primary set for 27 May, in concurrence with other APC senatorial primaries; challenges to the result could be made on 28 May.

About two months before the primary date, Alimikhena declared for re-election but former Edo State Governor and former APC National Chairman Adams Oshiomhole also announced that he would run for the seat; however, Oshiomhole also declared his campaign for president around the same time. Despite calls from pro-Alimikhena groups for Oshiomhole to continue his presidential campaign, he dropped the presidential campaign in mid-May causing Alimikhena to withdraw from the senatorial primary and leave the APC. At the primary in Auchi, Oshiomhole won easily and said afterwards that he "will ensure that the voice of Edo North will be loud and clear" in the Senate and called on Alimikhena to accept the primary.

APC primary results
Party	Candidate	Votes	%
APC	Adams Oshiomhole	309	98.41%
APC	Francis Alimikhena (withdrawn)	5	1.59%
Total votes		314	100.00%
Invalid or blank votes		3	N/A
Turnout		317	99.06%

==== People's Democratic Party ====
On 16 March 2022, the national PDP announced its senatorial primary timetable, setting its expression of interest form price at ₦1 million and the nomination form price at ₦20 million with a 50% discount for candidates between 25 and 30. Forms were to be sold until 1 April but the party later extended the deadline four times before reaching a final deadline of 22 April. After the submission of nomination forms by 25 April, candidates were screened by a party committee on 27 April while 2 May was the rescheduled date for the screening appeal process. Ward congresses were set for 29 April and LGA congresses were rescheduled for 10 May to elect delegates for the primary. Candidates approved by the screening process advanced to a primary set for 23 May, in concurrence with other PDP senatorial primaries but due to often violently enforced Monday stay-at-home orders by separatists, southeastern state parties held their primaries on 24 May; challenges to the result could be made on 25 May.

In the year before the primaries, the Edo State PDP split between two factions: one group led by incumbent Governor Godwin Obaseki and his allies who joined the PDP with him in 2020 with a rival bloc led by the national PDP South-South Deputy National Vice-Chairman Dan Orbih and longtime party members. The dispute escalated in late 2021 when the Obaseki-aligned state PDP leadership attempted to suspend Orbih's membership and the two factions held separate party congresses. Despite a court order that recognised the Orbih faction a few days before the primary date, both factions held separate primaries with longtime party members mainly winning the Orbih factional primaries and recent defectors mainly winning the Obaseki factional primaries.

In the Orbih-aligned factional primary, Pascal Ugbome—a former member of the Edo State House of Assembly—defeated runner-up Tony Ezekiel by a 47% margin. In the original Obaseki-aligned factional primary, Victoria Edelokun defeated Ugbome by an even greater margin but she withdrew from the nomination a few days later. The Obaseki factional PDP leadership called a new primary for 4 June in Auchi which the newly defected Alimikhena won by a 94% margin. Afterwards, Ugbome protested to the media and repeated his claim to be the legitimate PDP nominee. In INEC's final list of nominees in September, the Orbih faction's nominees were recognized due to the previous court order; however, Federal High Court promptly ordered the recognition of the Obaseki faction's nominees before the Supreme Court dismissed an appeal by Orbih's faction. However, it was not until 2 February 2023 that the apex court definitivelu ruled on the matter, again siding with the Obaseki faction.

Orbih-aligned primary results

PDP Orbih-aligned primary results
Party	Candidate	Votes	%
PDP	Pascal Ugbome	140	70.71%
PDP	Tony Ezekiel	47	23.74%
PDP	Wilson Osigwe	11	5.55%
Total votes		198	100.00%

Original Obaseki-aligned primary results

PDP Obaseki-aligned primary results
Party	Candidate	Votes	%
PDP	Victoria Edelokun	183	97.86%
PDP	Pascal Ugbome	3	1.60%
PDP	Wilson Osigwe	1	0.54%
Total votes		187	100.00%

PDP Obaseki-aligned rerun primary results
Party	Candidate	Votes	%
PDP	Francis Alimikhena	181	96.28%
PDP	Pascal Ugbome	4	2.13%
PDP	Tony Ezekiel	3	1.59%
Total votes		198	100.00%

=== Campaign ===
In a January 2023 campaign analysis piece, reporters from The Punch labeled Oshiomhole as the frontrunner due to his longtime electoral influence in the region. However, the report also noted Alimikhena's incumbency advantage along with how the rise of Peter Obi's presidential candidacy could boost Anselm Eragbe—the LP senatorial nominee. In the week before the election, the Daily Post noted that despite Oshiomhole and APC strength in the district, both the LP and PDP were genuine electoral threats (especially amid the naira scarcity crisis).

=== General election ===
==== Results ====
2023 Edo North Senatorial District election
Party	Candidate	Votes	%
AA	Francis Ojo Onaivi		
ADP	Kingson Akhimie		
ADC	Paul Ehidiamhe		
APC	Adams Oshiomhole		
BP	Osiriame Edeipo		
LP	Anselm Eragbe		
New Nigeria Peoples Party	Andrew Ayemere Igwemoh		
PDP	Francis Alimikhena		
SDP	Frank Akharume		
ZLP	Paul Yakubu		
Total votes			100.00%
Invalid or blank votes			N/A
Turnout			

== Edo South ==
2023 Edo South Senatorial District election
- 25 February 2023
Nominee	Valentine Asuen	Matthew Iduoriyekemwen	Ned Imasuen
Party	APC	PDP	LP
Senator before election
Matthew Urhoghide
PDP
Elected Senator
Ned Imasuen
LP

The Edo South Senatorial District covers the local government areas of Egor, Ikpoba Okha, Oredo, Orhionmwon, Ovia North-East, Ovia South-West, and Uhunmwonde. The incumbent Matthew Urhoghide (PDP), who was re-elected with 51.0% of the vote in 2019, sought re-election but was defeated in the PDP primary.

=== Primary elections ===
==== All Progressives Congress ====
On 20 April 2022, the APC National Executive Committee announced the party's schedule for senatorial primaries, setting its expression of interest form price at ₦3 million and nomination form price at ₦17 million with a 50% discount for candidates younger than 40 while women and candidates with disabilities get free nomination forms. Forms were to be sold from 26 April to 6 May until the deadline was later extended to 10 May then 12 May. After the submission of nomination forms by 13 May, candidates were screened by a party committee on 14 and 15 May while 18 May was the date for the screening appeal process. Ward congresses and LGA congresses were set for 16 and 17 May to elect delegates for the primary. Candidates approved by the screening process advanced to a primary set for 27 May, in concurrence with other APC senatorial primaries; challenges to the result could be made on 28 May.

The primary, which was held in a sports hall at the University of Benin in Benin City, resulted in Valentine Asuen's nomination. Asuen—a businessman, former APC official, and Oredo local government councilor—defeated former Deputy Governor Lucky Imasuen.

APC primary results
Party	Candidate	Votes	%
APC	Valentine Asuen	215	57.33%
APC	Lucky Imasuen	160	42.67%
Total votes		375	100.00%
Invalid or blank votes		4	N/A
Turnout		379	100.00%

==== People's Democratic Party ====
On 16 March 2022, the national PDP announced its senatorial primary timetable, setting its expression of interest form price at ₦1 million and the nomination form price at ₦20 million with a 50% discount for candidates between 25 and 30. Forms were to be sold until 1 April but the party later extended the deadline four times before reaching a final deadline of 22 April. After the submission of nomination forms by 25 April, candidates were screened by a party committee on 27 April while 2 May was the rescheduled date for the screening appeal process. Ward congresses were set for 29 April and LGA congresses were rescheduled for 10 May to elect delegates for the primary. Candidates approved by the screening process advanced to a primary set for 23 May, in concurrence with other PDP senatorial primaries but due to often violently enforced Monday stay-at-home orders by separatists, southeastern state parties held their primaries on 24 May; challenges to the result could be made on 25 May.

In the year before the primaries, the Edo State PDP split between two factions: one group led by incumbent Governor Godwin Obaseki and his allies who joined the PDP with him in 2020 with a rival bloc led by the national PDP South-South Deputy National Vice-Chairman Dan Orbih and longtime party members. The dispute escalated in late 2021 when the Obaseki-aligned state PDP leadership attempted to suspend Orbih's membership and the two factions held separate party congresses. Despite a court order that recognised the Orbih faction a few days before the primary date, both factions held separate primaries with longtime party members mainly winning the Orbih factional primaries and recent defectors mainly winning the Obaseki factional primaries.

In the Orbih-aligned factional primary, Omoregie Ogbeide-Ihama—member of the House of Representatives for Oredo—was nominated unanimously but the primary was marred by three events: the shooting of an Orbih-aligned PDP ward chairman, an attack on the primary venue by allegedly Obaseki-supporting thugs, and the arrest of four journalists by police for covering an "illegal" primary. In the Obaseki-aligned factional primary at the Samuel Ogbemudia Stadium, incumbent Urhoghide was defeated by Matthew Iduoriyekemwen—former member of the Edo State House of Assembly—in a narrow race; Urhoghide promptly walked out of the venue. In INEC's final list of nominees in September, the Orbih faction's nominees were recognized due to the previous court order; however, Federal High Court promptly ordered the recognition of the Obaseki faction's nominees before the Supreme Court dismissed an appeal by Orbih's faction. However, it was not until 2 February 2023 that the apex court definitivelu ruled on the matter, again siding with the Obaseki faction.

Orbih-aligned primary results

PDP Orbih-aligned primary results
Party	Candidate	Votes	%
PDP	Omoregie Ogbeide-Ihama	177	100.00%
PDP	Other candidates	0	0.00%
Total votes		177	100.00%
Invalid or blank votes		1	N/A
Turnout		178	72.65%

PDP Obaseki-aligned primary results
Party	Candidate	Votes	%
PDP	Matthew Iduoriyekemwen	113	52.31%
PDP	Matthew Urhoghide	103	47.69%
Total votes		216	100.00%

=== General election ===
==== Results ====
2023 Edo South Senatorial District election
Party	Candidate	Votes	%
AA	Osas Omoruyi		
ADP	Ebenezer Akpovire Akpobi		
ADC	Oluwakemi Christiana Igunbor		
APC	Valentine Asuen		
LP	Neda Imasuen		
NRM	Imaren Augustine Obanor		
New Nigeria Peoples Party	Frederice Musa Osar-ose Uyigue		
PDP	Matthew Iduoriyekemwen		
SDP	Friday Osaruemwin Oronsaye		
ZLP	Osagie Erhunmwunse		
Total votes			100.00%
Invalid or blank votes			N/A
Turnout			

== See also ==
- 2023 Nigerian Senate election
- 2023 Nigerian elections
