= 2015 Nigerian Senate elections in Edo State =

The 2015 Nigerian Senate election in Edo State was held on March 28, 2015, to elect members of the Nigerian Senate to represent Edo State. Francis Alimikhena representing Edo North won on the platform of the All Progressives Congress, while Matthew Urhoghide representing Edo South and Clifford Ordia representing Edo Central won on the platform of the People's Democratic Party.

== Overview ==
Affiliation	Party		Total
Affiliation	APC	PDP	Total
Before Election	2	1	3
After Election	1	2	3

== Summary ==
District	Incumbent	Party	Elected Senator	Party
Edo Central	Odion Ugbesia	PDP	Clifford Ordia	PDP
Edo South	Ehigie Edobor Uzamere	APC	Matthew Urhoghide	PDP
Edo North	Domingo Alaba Obende	APC	Francis Alimikhena	APC

=== Edo Central ===
The two major parties All Progressives Congress, and People's Democratic Party registered with the Independent National Electoral Commission to contest in the election. PDP candidate Clifford Ordia won the election, defeating, APC candidate Francis Inegbeniki and other party candidates.

2015 Nigerian Senate election in Edo State
Party	Candidate	Votes	%
PDP	Clifford Ordia	-	-
APC	Francis Inegbenikiwe	-	-
PDP hold			

=== Edo South ===
The two major parties All Progressives Congress, and People's Democratic Party registered with the Independent National Electoral Commission to contest in the election. PDP candidate Matthew Urhoghide won the election, defeating, APC candidate Samson Osagie and other party candidates.

2015 Nigerian Senate election in Edo State
Party	Candidate	Votes	%
PDP	Matthew Urhoghide	-	-
APC	Samson Osagie	-	-
PDP hold			

=== Edo North ===
The two major parties All Progressives Congress, and People's Democratic Party registered with the Independent National Electoral Commission to contest in the election. APC candidate Francis Alimikhena won the election, defeating, PDP candidate Paschal Ugbome and other party candidates.

2015 Nigerian Senate election in Edo State
Party	Candidate	Votes	%
APC	Francis Alimikhena	-	-
PDP	Samson Osagie	-	-
APC hold			
