= 2011 Nigerian Senate elections in Edo State =

2011 Nigerian Senate election in Edo State

The 2011 Nigerian Senate election in Edo State was held on April 9, 2011, to elect members of the Nigerian Senate to represent Edo State. Domingo Alaba Obende representing Edo North and Ehigie Edobor Uzamere representing Edo South won on the platform of Action Congress of Nigeria, while Odion Ugbesia representing Edo Central on the platform of Peoples Democratic Party.

== Overview ==
Affiliation	Party		Total
Affiliation	ACN	PDP	Total
Before Election			3
After Election	2	1	3

== Summary ==
District	Incumbent	Party	Elected Senator	Party
Edo North			Domingo Alaba Obende	ACN
Edo South			Ehigie Edobor Uzamere	ACN
Edo Central			Odion Ugbesia	PDP

== Results ==
=== Edo North ===
Action Congress of Nigeria candidate Domingo Alaba Obende won the election, defeating other party candidates.

2011 Nigerian Senate election in Edo State
Party	Candidate	Votes	%
Action Congress of Nigeria	Domingo Alaba Obende		
Total votes			
ACN hold			

=== Edo South ===
Action Congress of Nigeria candidate Ehigie Edobor Uzamere won the election, defeating other party candidates.

2011 Nigerian Senate election in Edo State
Party	Candidate	Votes	%
ACN	Ehigie Edobor Uzamere		
Total votes			
ACN hold			

=== Edo Central ===
Peoples Democratic Party candidate Odion Ugbesia won the election, defeating party candidates.

2011 Nigerian Senate election in Edo State
Party	Candidate	Votes	%
PDP	Odion Ugbesia		
Total votes			
PDP hold			
