= Nosa Adams =

Nigerian lawyer and politician

Commissioner for Environment and Sustainability
- Incumbent
- Assumed office October 2025
- Governor: Monday Okpebholo

Chairman of Egor Local Government Council

Personal details
- Born: Nosa Toyaki Adams
- Party: All Progressives Congress (2024–present)
- Other political affiliations: Peoples Democratic Party
- Education: Nigerian Law School
- Occupation: Lawyer, politician
- Profession: Legal practitioner

Nosa Toyaki Adams is a Nigerian lawyer and politician from Edo State. He is the Commissioner for Environment and Sustainability in Edo State under Governor Monday Okpebholo.

Before becoming commissioner, Adams served as chairman of Egor Local Government Council and held political positions in Edo State.

== Early life and legal career ==
Adams is a lawyer from Edo State. He completed professional legal training at the Nigerian Law School and has practised law.

He had previously served as chairman of Egor Local Government Council, Special Adviser to the Edo State Governor and General Manager of Edo State Rubber Estates.

== Political career ==
Adams served as chairman of Egor Local Government Council and was formerly the publicity secretary of the Peoples Democratic Party in Edo State.

In 2014, he sought the Peoples Democratic Party nomination for the Edo State House of Assembly seat representing Egor constituency. His candidacy became the subject of a dispute within the party.

Ahead of the 2024 Edo State gubernatorial election, Adams left the PDP and joined the All Progressives Congress. Reports identified him as a former chairman of Egor Local Government and a former PDP state publicity secretary.

During the 2024 Edo governorship campaign, he was identified in media reports as an APC chieftain and a former chairman of Egor Local Government Area.

== Commissioner for Environment and Sustainability ==
In August 2025, Governor Monday Okpebholo nominated Adams as one of four commissioner-designates for Edo State.

The Edo State House of Assembly confirmed Adams and seven other nominees as commissioners on 21 August 2025.

Adams assumed duties as Commissioner for Environment and Sustainability in October 2025.

As commissioner, he has been involved in the Edo State Government's environmental management and pollution-control activities.

In 2026, he participated in state environmental initiatives and discussions concerning pollution control, flood management and environmental monitoring.

== Legal matters ==
In 2014, Adams' political activities and candidacy for the Edo State House of Assembly became the subject of reports concerning criminal allegations and a dispute over his screening by the Peoples Democratic Party. Contemporary reports described the allegations and subsequent legal proceedings.

In March 2026, following a ruling concerning restrictions imposed during Edo State's monthly sanitation exercise, Adams stated that the state government would appeal the judgment.
