= Ethan Osazemen Uzamere =

Commissioner for Roads and Bridges, Edo State
- In office June 2023 – November 2024
- Governor: Godwin Obaseki

Commissioner for Mining, Oil and Gas, Edo State
- In office September 2021 – June 2023
- Governor: Godwin Obaseki

Chief of Staff to the Governor of Edo State
- In office 25 April 2020 – September 2021
- Governor: Godwin Obaseki
- Preceded by: Taiwo Akerele

Personal details
- Party: African Democratic Congress
- Relatives: Ehigie Edobor Uzamere (father)
- Education: Stony Brook University
- Occupation: Engineer, investment banker, politician

Ethan Osazemen Uzamere (also known as Osaze Ethan Uzamere) is a Nigerian engineer, investment banker, and politician from Edo State. He served as Chief of Staff to Governor Godwin Obaseki from 2020 to 2021, and later served in the Edo State Executive Council as Commissioner for Mining, Oil and Gas (2021–2023) and Commissioner for Roads and Bridges (2023–2024). He is the African Democratic Congress candidate for the Ovia Federal Constituency in the House of Representatives for the 2027 general election.

== Early life and education ==
Uzamere is the son of Ehigie Edobor Uzamere, who represented the Edo South Senatorial District in the Senate from 2007 to 2015. He graduated from Stony Brook University in New York, majoring in computer and electrical engineering.

== Career ==
Before entering public service, Uzamere worked in investment banking and engineering, holding roles at firms including Lehman Brothers and South Grade Engineering.

On 25 April 2020, Governor Godwin Obaseki appointed Uzamere as Chief of Staff following the resignation of Taiwo Akerele.

In September 2021, Obaseki nominated Uzamere as a commissioner. Following screening by the Edo State House of Assembly, he was appointed Commissioner for Mining, Oil and Gas.

In June 2023, Uzamere was reassigned as Commissioner for Roads and Bridges. He served until the end of the Obaseki administration in November 2024.

=== Politics ===
Uzamere joined the African Democratic Congress and became its candidate for the Ovia Federal Constituency (comprising Ovia North-East and Ovia South-West) in the House of Representatives for the 2027 election.

== Personal life ==
Uzamere is a son of former senator Ehigie Edobor Uzamere.
