= Jerry Uwangue =

Nigerian businessman and politician

Hon. Jerry Uwangue
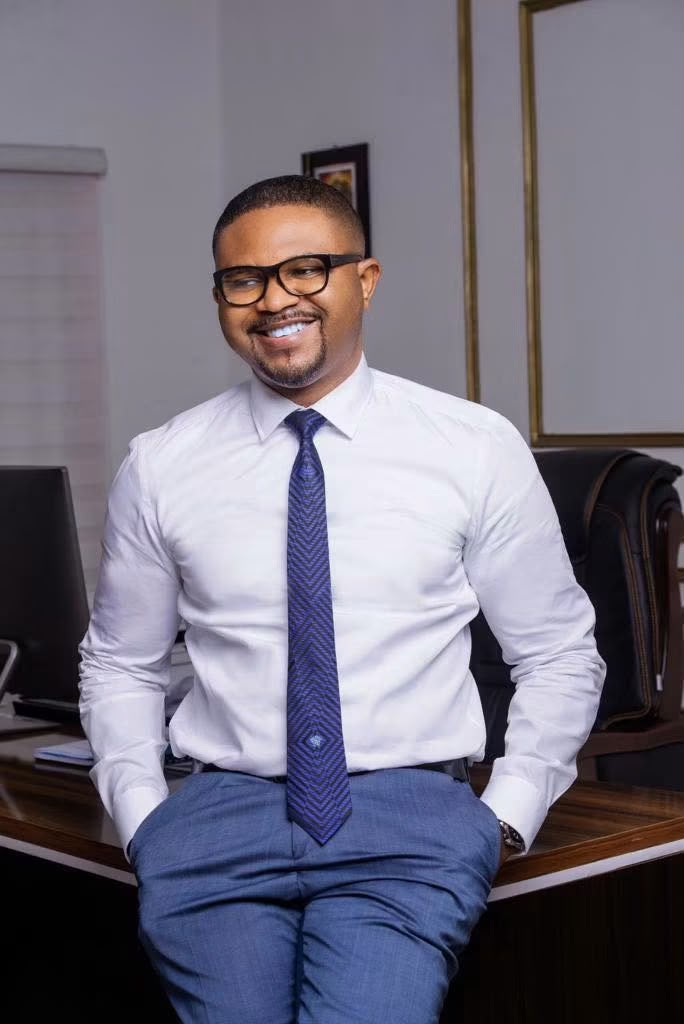

Commissioner for Agriculture and Food Security, Edo State
- Incumbent
- Assumed office October 2025
- Governor: Monday Okpebholo

Personal details
- Born: 14 January 1981 (age 45) Edo State, Nigeria
- Education: Ambrose Alli University, Southern New Hampshire University
- Occupation: Businessman, Politician

Jerry Uwangue is a Nigerian businessman and politician. Since 2025, he has served as Commissioner for Agriculture and Food Security in Edo State.

== Early life ==
Jerry Uwangue was born on 14 January 1981 in Benin City, Edo State, Nigeria.

== Education ==
Uwangue attended the Katy Nursery and Primary School, Benin City, and his Secondary School at Word of Faith Secondary School, Benin City. He gained admission to study at Ambrose Alli University, Ekpoma, Edo State, where he earned a Bachelor of Science Degree in Business Administration. He later enrolled at the Harvard Business School Online Course where he earned a Sustainable Business Strategy Certification. He moved to the United States and enrolled at Southern New Hampshire University, where he gained his BS in Business Administration with a concentration in Project Management ++ (BS.BAD.PMA).

== Political life and career ==
Uwangue began his career as an enterprise/marketing manager at Augus Services Nig. Ltd and later joined Lee Engineering and Construction Company Ltd as senior manager and business development relations manager. Due to his engineering background, he formed his own company J&G Engineering and Constructions Services Ltd in 2019.

In October 2025, Governor Monday Okpebholo nominated Uwangue for a commissioner role. Following confirmation, he was appointed Commissioner for Agriculture and Food Security in Edo State.
