= Neda Imasuen =

Nigerian politician

Senator
- Incumbent
- Assumed office 13 June 2023
- Preceded by: Matthew Urhoghide
- Constituency: Edo South Senatorial District

Personal details
- Born: 29 June 1958 (age 68)
- Party: All progressives Congress
- Education: University of Maiduguri
- Occupation: Politician, lawyer

Neda Bernards Imasuen is a Senator of the Federal Republic of Nigeria from Edo State. He was disbarred by the New York State Supreme Court in 2010 for professional misconduct. He was elected in 2023 to represent Edo South senatorial district in the National Assembly. He is a member of the Labour Party.

== Early life and education ==
Imasuen started his primary education from St. Thomas' Catholic School, in Benin City, Edo State where he obtained his Primary School Leaving Certificate. He proceeded to the Edo Boys High School, also Benin City and obtained the West African School Certificate. After his secondary education, he proceeded to the University of Maiduguri where he graduated with a Bachelor of Laws degree. He was certified and enrolled as a Solicitor and Advocate of the Supreme Court of Nigeria in 1985. He graduated with a Master's degree in Public Administration from the Long Island University, Brooklyn Campus in 2004.

== Career ==
In the Nigerian general elections of 2023, Imasuen of minority Labour Party defeated Matthew Iduoriyekemwen of the PDP and Valentine Asuen of the APC to become the senator representing the Edo South senatorial district in the Nigerian senate.

== Personal life ==
Imasuen is married with children.

== Allegations of Corruption ==
Imasuen has faced allegations of corruption following reports that he and Senator Victor Umeh played a key role in organizing a meeting at the guest house of Senate President Godswill Akpabio. According to Sahara Reporters, during this meeting, 87 senators allegedly received payouts ranging from $5,000 to $10,000 each to secure legislative support for President Bola Tinubu’s declaration of a state of emergency in Rivers State.
