= 2007 Nigerian Senate elections in Edo State =

The 2007 Nigerian Senate election in Edo State was held on April 21, 2007, to elect members of the Nigerian Senate to represent Edo State. Odion Ugbesia representing Edo Central, Yisa Braimoh representing Edo North and Ehigie Edobor Uzamere representing Edo South all won on the platform of the Peoples Democratic Party.

== Overview ==
Affiliation	Party		Total
Affiliation	PDP	AC	Total
Before Election			3
After Election	3	0	3

== Summary ==
District	Incumbent	Party	Elected Senator	Party
Edo Central			Odion Ugbesia	PDP
Edo North			Yisa Braimoh	PDP
Edo South			Ehigie Edobor Uzamere	PDP

== Results ==
=== Edo Central ===
The election was won by Odion Ugbesia of the Peoples Democratic Party.

2007 Nigerian Senate election in Edo State
Party	Candidate	Votes	%
PDP	Odion Ugbesia		
Total votes			
PDP hold			

=== Edo North ===
The election was won by Yisa Braimoh of the Peoples Democratic Party.

2007 Nigerian Senate election in Edo State
Party	Candidate	Votes	%
PDP	Yisa Braimoh		
Total votes			
PDP hold			

=== Edo South ===
The election was won by Ehigie Edobor Uzamere of the Peoples Democratic Party.

2007 Nigerian Senate election in Edo State
Party	Candidate	Votes	%
PDP	Ehigie Edobor Uzamere		
Total votes			
PDP hold			
