= Urhoghide =

Urhoghide is a surname. Notable people with the surname include:

- Matthew Urhoghide (born 1955), Nigerian politician
- Osaze Urhoghide (born 2000), English footballer
