= Asue Ighodalo =

Nigerian lawyer

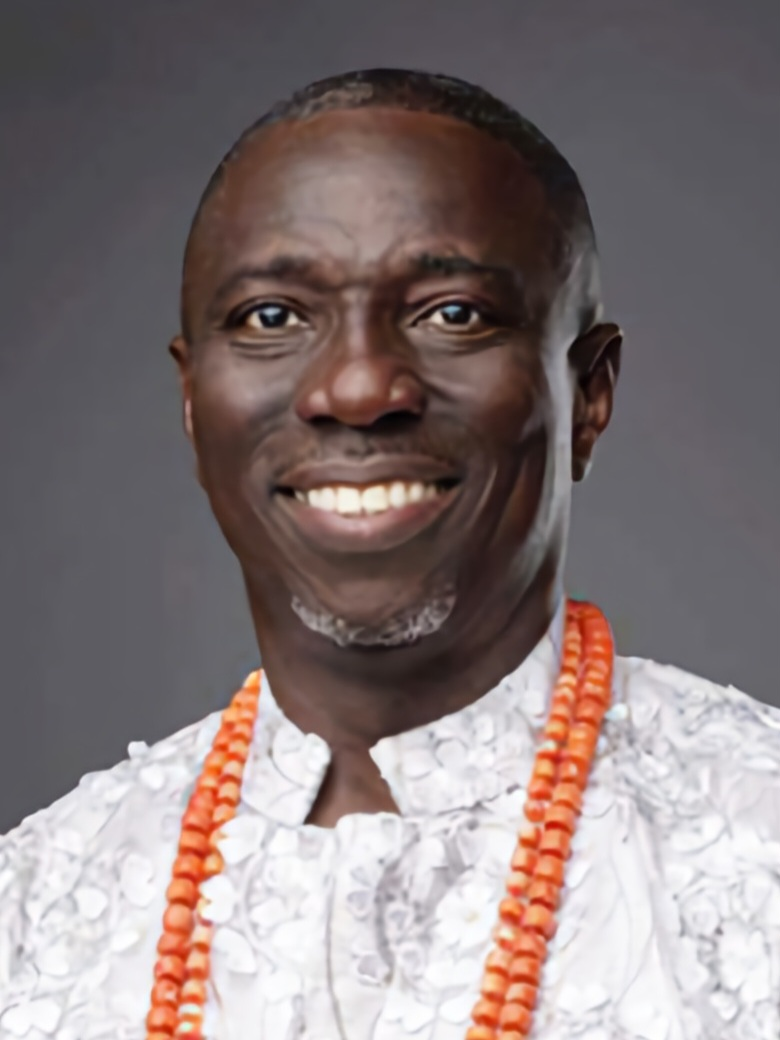
- Asue Ighodalo
- Education: King's College, Lagos, University of Ibadan; Nigerian Law School; London School of Economics
- Occupations: Chairman, Sterling Bank Plc, Director, Nigerian Sovereign Investment Authority, Chairman Nigerian Economic Summit Group. Lawyer.
- Spouse: Ifeyinwa Ighodalo
- Children: Omoehi Ighodalo

Asuerinme Ighodalo is a Nigerian lawyer and politician. He is from Okaigben, Ewohimi, Esan South East LGA, Edo State, Nigeria. He was a candidate in the 2024 Edo State gubernatorial election. He is a founding partner of the law firm Banwo & Ighodalo, alongside Femi Olubanwo, a corporate and commercial law practice in Nigeria, specializing in advising major corporations on corporate finance, capital markets, energy and natural resources, mergers and acquisitions, banking and securitization and project finance. He was the chairman of Sterling Bank, a director at the Nigerian Sovereign Investment Authority (NSIA), and chairman of the Nigerian Economic Summit Group (NESG).

== Education ==
Ighodalo attended King's College, Lagos. He obtained B.Sc degree in Economics from the University of Ibadan in 1981, an LL.B from the London School of Economics and Political Science in 1984 and a B.L from the Nigerian Law School, Lagos in 1985.

== Career ==
Upon graduation from Nigerian Law School, Lagos, Ighodalo worked as an associate in the law firm of Chris Ogunbanjo & Co. between 1985 and 1991. In 1991, he set up Banwo & Ighodalo, in partnership with Femi Olubanwo. The firm is consistently ranked among leading Nigerian law firms in capital markets, securities, and mergers and acquisitions. Ighodalo's core areas of practice include corporate finance, capital markets, energy and natural resources, mergers and acquisitions, banking, securitization and project finance.

In 2014, Ighodalo advised Zenith Bank Plc on a US$500 million eurobond issuance and Diamond Bank Plc on a US$200 million eurobond issuance.

He resigned from all corporate positions he held to aspire to become the governor of Edo State.

On February 22, 2024, Ighodalo emerged as the People's Democratic Party (PDP) candidate for the 2024 Edo State gubernatorial election. However, a Federal High Court sitting in Abuja nullified election on the ground that 378 delegates who were to vote during primary election were unlawfully denied their rights to vote.

His candidacy was eventually upheld by the Federal High Court in Abuja, which confirmed Ighodalo as the legitimately nominated governorship candidate of the PDP in Edo State and dismissed the lawsuit challenging his nomination.

He lost the election to the APC candidate, Monday Okpebholo, and challenged the election results in court on the basis of non-compliance with the Electoral Act.

On April 2, 2025, the tribunal delivered a unanimous judgment dismissing the petition on the grounds that Ighodalo failed to provide sufficient evidence of electoral malpractice or non-compliance with the Electoral Act.

Ighodalo subsequently rejected the verdict, describing it as a "travesty of justice," and appealed to the Supreme Court, which affirmed Okpebholo's election in July 2025.

== Publications and works ==
Ighodalo has presented papers on capital markets within and outside Nigeria and has authored articles in law publications. He has also lectured on corporate governance, directors' duties and responsibilities, and entrepreneurship at the Institute of Directors, Lagos Business School and FATE Foundation entrepreneurial training sessions, respectively.

== Boards and memberships ==
Ighodalo was the chairman of the board of directors of Sterling Bank Plc, Dangote Flour Mills Plc and the Nigerian Economic Summit Group (NESG). He has also served on the boards of other public and private companies, non-governmental organizations (NGOs) and a statutory body, including Okomu Oil Palm Company Plc, the Nigeria Sovereign Investment Authority (NSIA) and the FATE Foundation (an NGO committed to the development of entrepreneurs in Nigeria).

Ighodalo became the chairman of Sterling Bank in August 2014. He is a member of Nigerian Bar Association (NBA) and a past chairman of the NBA – Section on Business Law (NBA SBL). He is also a member of Association of International Petroleum Negotiators (AIPN), USA, Nigerian Economic Summit Group, International Bar Association (IBA), Nigerian Maritime Law Association, Commercial Law and Taxation Committee of the Lagos Chamber of Commerce and Industry, London School of Economics Lawyers' Group and an associate member of the Chartered Institute of Taxation.

== Family ==
Ighodalo is married to Ifeyinwa, and they have two daughters, Omoehi and Ayomide.

He is the elder brother of Ituah Ighodalo, senior pastor of Trinity House, Lagos.
