= Ikara community =

Ikara, a community of approximately 1,500 inhabitants, spread across eight settlements namely Ode Aja Ikara, Obiteyin Ikara, Ugbokoko Ikara, Karatie, Ugbogolo, Ugbogun Ikara, Aja Oyibo and Obamahan. It is located in the heart of the Ologbo Forest Reserve, with longitude latitude coordinates - 6.04124 5.51136, in Ikpoba Okha Local Government Area of Edo State, Nigeria.

Its modern-day inhabitants are primarily farmers and hunters, even though historically they used to be fishermen and forest gatherers.

The community sits on the confluence of rivers Ogba and Ossiomo, with intersecting seasonal streams, which give Ikara a feel of an island. The inhabitants are traditionally Itsekiri by tribe, and have inhabited Ikara for centuries. They are consider of the Iyatsere traditional lineage of the Itsekiri tribe, and are descendants from Ugboju and Kikene.

Ikara community is governed under a constitution that spells out how the indigenes choose to organize themselves and manage their affairs. The current chairman of the Community Trust is Mr Dickson Bawo.

Motto & Logo: The motto of Ikara Community is "Unity, Peace and Progress". The Logo of the Community is an Elephant (Iyemeriko) standing by an Oil Palm tree (Ogboroge). These symbols signify a naturally wealthy Community (Aja Uwa). Ale kara kara. The Elephant (Iyemeriko) was a common sight in the thick virgin forest of Ikara Community (ale kara kara) when the Pa Ugboju and Pa Kikene Maleghemi (Alias Ijeibi and Agbofuyatseri) originally founded and settled for farming, fishing and hunting in 1470s.
