= Osarodion Ogie =

Nigerian politician (born 1960)

Former secretary to the State Government of Edo State
- In office 14 November 2016 – 10 August 2024
- Governor: Godwin Obaseki
- Preceded by: Simon Imuekemhe
- Succeeded by: Joseph Eboigbe

Personal details
- Born: Osarodion Ogie; 24 September 1960 (age 66) Ikpoba Okha, Edo State, Nigeria
- Party: Peoples Democratic Party
- Education: Obafemi Awolowo University
- Occupation: Lawyer; Politician

Osarodion Ogie (born 24 September 1960) is a Nigerian lawyer and politician who served as the secretary to the State Government of Edo State from 2016 and 2020 to August 2024 under the administration of Governor Godwin Obaseki.

== Early life and education ==
Osarodion hails from Ikpoba Okha Local Government Area, Edo State. He attended St. Saviour Primary School in Benin City, before he proceeded to Eghosa Grammar School in Benin City, where he obtained the West Africa School Certificate in 1973. He attended the Institute of Continuing Education (ICE), Benin City and obtained his General Certificate of Education. Osarodion received a Bachelor of Laws LLB (Hons) from Obafemi Awolowo University, Ile-Ife in 1981. In 1985, he attended the Nigerian Law School,where he obtainted his Barrister at Law (B.L) in 1986 and subsequently called to the Nigerian Bar Association the same year.

== Law career ==
He began his law firm Osarodian Ogie and Co, legal Practitioners in Lagos in 1988. He also worked at Crandon Hull Law Firm & Associate (2008).

== Politics ==
In 2000, he delved into politics and was appointed as the chief of staff of Edo State Government between 2008 and 2012 under Adams Oshiomhole governship and Honorable Commissioner for Works of Edo State Government between 2013.

He first served as secretary to the state government (SSG) of Edo State in 2016 during the first term of Edo State Governor Godwin Obaseki. On 17 November 2020, Edo State Governor Godwin Obaseki re appointed Osarodion as the new secretary to the state government (SSG). He served in this role from 2016 until August 2024 when he resigned to concentrate on campaigning for the state election following his selection as running mate to Asue Ighodalo.
