= Matthew Iduoriyekemwen =

Nigerian politician

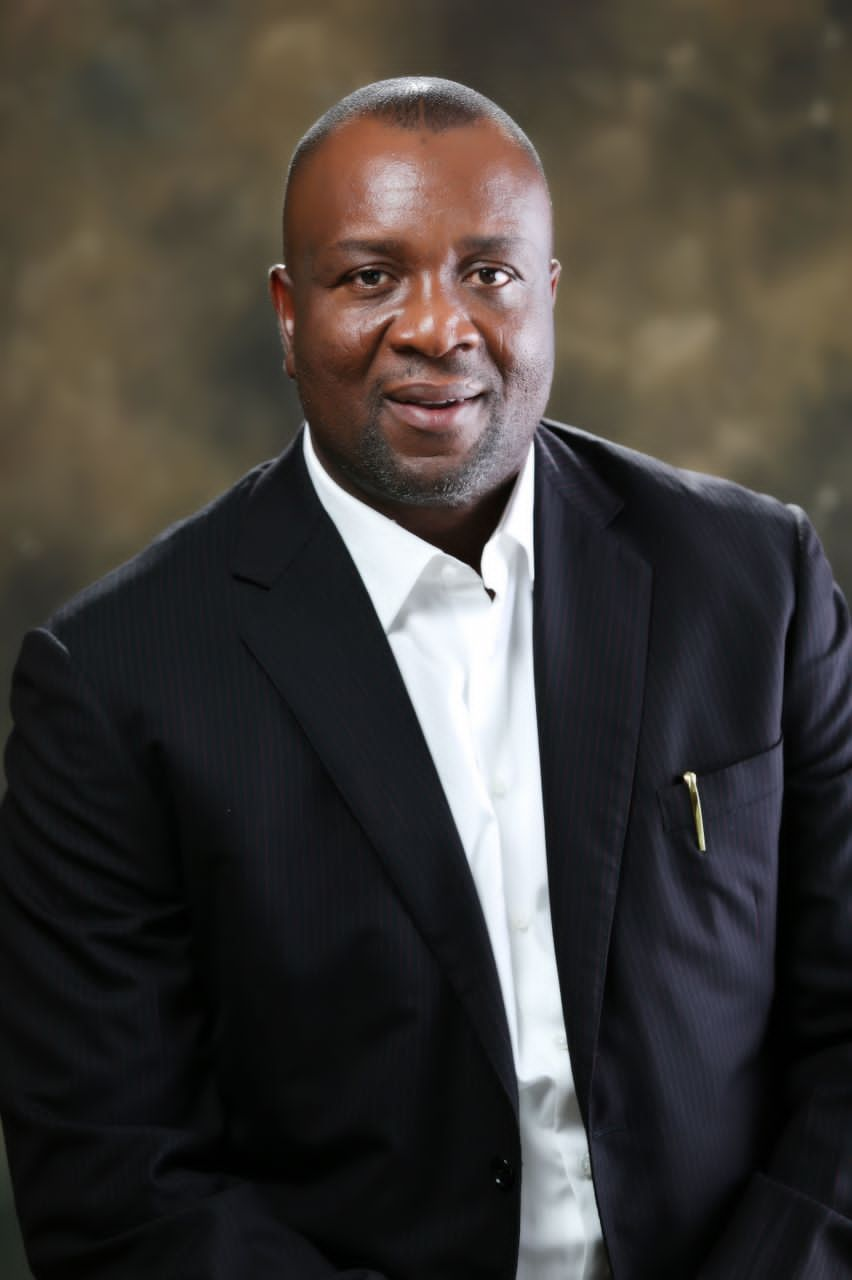

Federal commissioner representing Edo State at the NDDC
- In office 2005–2009

Member representing Ikpoba-Okha constituency in the Edo State House of Assembly
- In office 1999–2007

Majority Leader, Edo State House Of Assembly
- In office 1999–2003

Personal details
- Born: 2 May 1966 (age 59) Edo State, Nigeria
- Party: Peoples Democratic Party

Matthew Aigbuhenze Iduoriyekemwen (born 2 May 1966) is a Nigerian politician, businessman and former commissioner representing Edo State in the NDDC. He was the member representing Ikpoba Okha LGA in the Edo State House of Assembly between 1999 and 2007. He is currently a member of the Peoples Democratic Party (PDP).

== Early life and education ==
Matthew Iduoriyekemwen was born in Benin City, Edo State, Nigeria, the first child of Pa Joseph Osayi Iduoriyekewmen (JP) and Mrs Josephine Otasowie Iduoriyekemwen of Amagba, Benin City. He attended Uwa and Ohuoba Primary Schools in Benin for his primary education and proceeded to Immaculate Conception College, Benin City, for his secondary education.

Following his secondary education, Matthew Iduoriyekemwen proceeded to the University of Benin (Nigeria), where he studied Zoology and secured a Bachelor of Science degree in the second class upper division with honours. While at the University of Benin, he served as the President of the National Association of Zoology Students - Edo State Chapter and is credited with founding the taxidermic museum at the university. He served at the International Institute of Tropical Agriculture (IITA) for his mandatory one-year National Youth Service program in Ibadan, Oyo State. He later chose to return to education and obtained a Bachelor of Laws (LL. B (Hons)) degree from Ambrose Alli University.

== Political career ==
=== Edo State House of Assembly (EDHA) ===
Iduoriyekemwen's political career began in the Edo State House of Assembly, where he represented Ikpoba Okha LGA from 1999 to 2007. He served as the Majority Leader in his first term and as the Chairman of the House Committee on State Security during his second term.

=== Political Parties ===
==== People's Democratic Party (PDP) ====
Matthew Iduoriyekemwen is a founding member of the Peoples Democratic Party (Nigeria) in Edo State. He joined the party at inception in 1998, contested for the Edo State House of Assembly under the party's platform, and subsequently became part of the first democratic government in Edo State in the Fourth Republic. In 2012 and 2016, he contested for the governorship ticket of the PDP in Edo State. In the 2016 contest, he also participated in the primary election organized by the Ali Modu Sheriff faction of the PDP, where he emerged as a winner. Modu Sheriff was later sacked as national chairman of the PDP at the supreme court, invalidating the actions of his factional working committee. In 2022, he won the ticket to contest to represent the Edo South Senatorial District at the Nigerian Senate under the platform of the PDP.

==== All Progressives Congress (APC) ====
Following the fallout from the crisis in PDP in 2017, Matthew Iduoriyekemwen joined the APC with the serving House of Representatives member for Egor/Ikpoba-Okha at the time Agbonayinma Ehiozuwa. In the APC, he served on several political assignments within and outside Edo State before resigning from the party together with Governor Godwin Obaseki in the build-up to the 2020 Edo governorship election when he returned to the PDP.

=== Political assignments ===
- Secretary, United Nigeria People's Party Oredo Local Government Area. 1997-1998
- Edo State Co-ordinator, Yar'Adua/Jonathan campaign organisation. 2005
- Chairman, All Progressives Congress (APC) primary election committee, Kaduna State. 2018
- Chairman, Edo All Progressives Congress (APC) mobilisation committee, Edo State. 2020

== Personal life ==
Matthew Iduoriyekemwen is married to Dr. (Mrs) Nosa Iduoriyekemwen, a consultant Paediatric Nephrologist with the University of Benin Teaching Hospital and an associate professor at the University of Benin (Nigeria). They have two children. He is an avid golfer and is currently the Captain of the UBTH Golf Club, Benin City.
