= Femi Olubanwo =

Nigerian lawyer

- Born: 28 March 1958 (age 68); Nigeria
- Education: University of Lagos; Nigerian Law School
- Occupation: Lawyer
- Known for: Top ranking Intellectual Property Lawyer

Femi Olubanwo is a Nigerian lawyer. He is, alongside Asue Ighodalo, a founding partner of the law firm of Banwo and Ighodalo specializing in advising major corporations on Intellectual Property & Technology, Project Finance, mergers and acquisitions, capital markets, and matters affecting corporate finance and strategy. He has been engaged in many domestic and international financing related transactions.

== Early years ==
Femi Olubanwo graduated from University of Lagos in 1981, and Nigerian Law School in 1982.

== Later career ==
In 1991, Femi joined Ighodalo to form Banwo & Ighodalo which is consistently ranked as a leading Nigerian law firm in the areas of Capital Markets, Securities, Mergers & Acquisitions. In the last 30 years of his career, he has acted as legal adviser to multi-national and blue chip companies in various sectors including Pharmaceuticals, Telecommunications, and Manufacturing in relation to the protection and enforcement of their Intellectual Property Rights in Nigeria and Africa. In recognition of his dynamism, precision and attention to detail, Femi has been called upon, in various advisory capacities, to assist different tiers of government in Nigeria, and many multinationals, on economic liberalisation and reform. In 2010, he was appointed chairman of a committee set up by the Federal Ministry of Finance to design a code of governance/ethics for capital markets regulators.

In 2011, Femi was invited as a key speaker at year 2011 Harvard African Development Conference, held on 26 March 2011 at Harvard University.

== Publications and works ==
He is the author of Advertising to children in Nigeria", Young Consumers published in 2012. Femi has written many articles and frequently delivers papers and gives presentations on subjects in his core practice areas.

== Boards, memberships and awards ==
He sits as a director on the boards of several companies including BlackBerry Technologies Nigeria Limited (the Nigerian subsidiary of BlackBerry Limited), Calyx Securities Limited, and Courage Education Foundation (an NGO committed to sponsoring the education of brilliant but indigent children). Femi is a member of Nigerian Bar Association, Institute of Trade Mark Attorneys, Nigerian Maritime Law Association, International Trademark Association, World Trade Course of Nigeria.
