= 2024 Edo State gubernatorial election =

2024 gubernatorial election in Edo State, Nigeria

- 21 September 2024
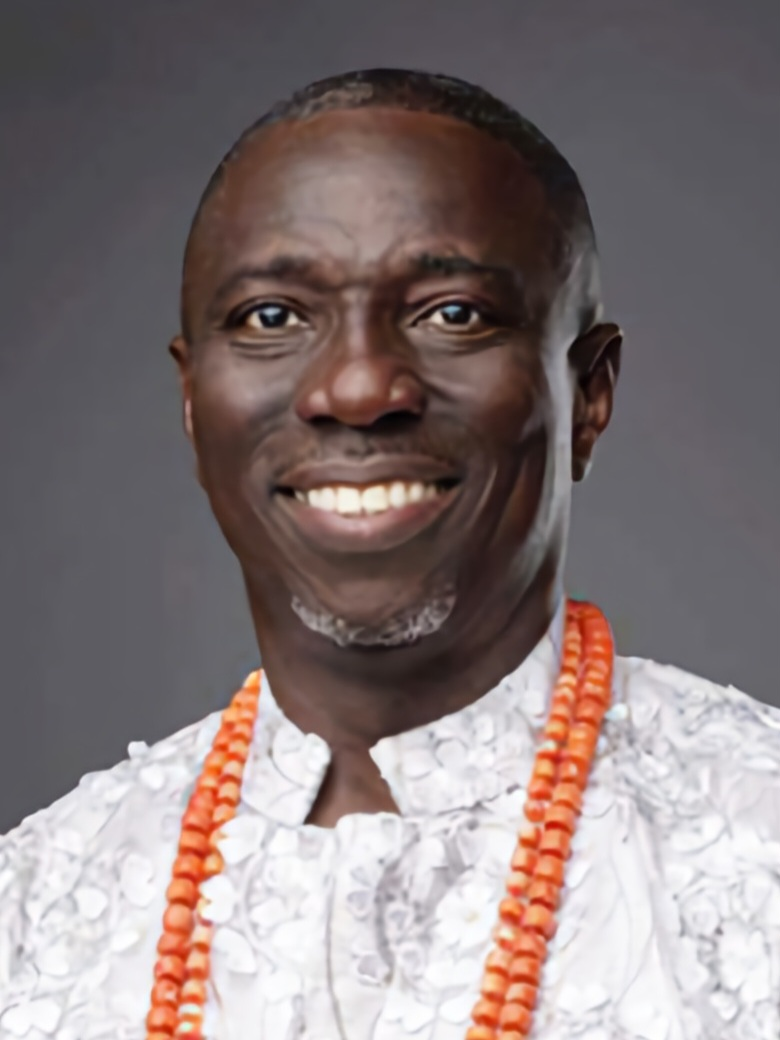

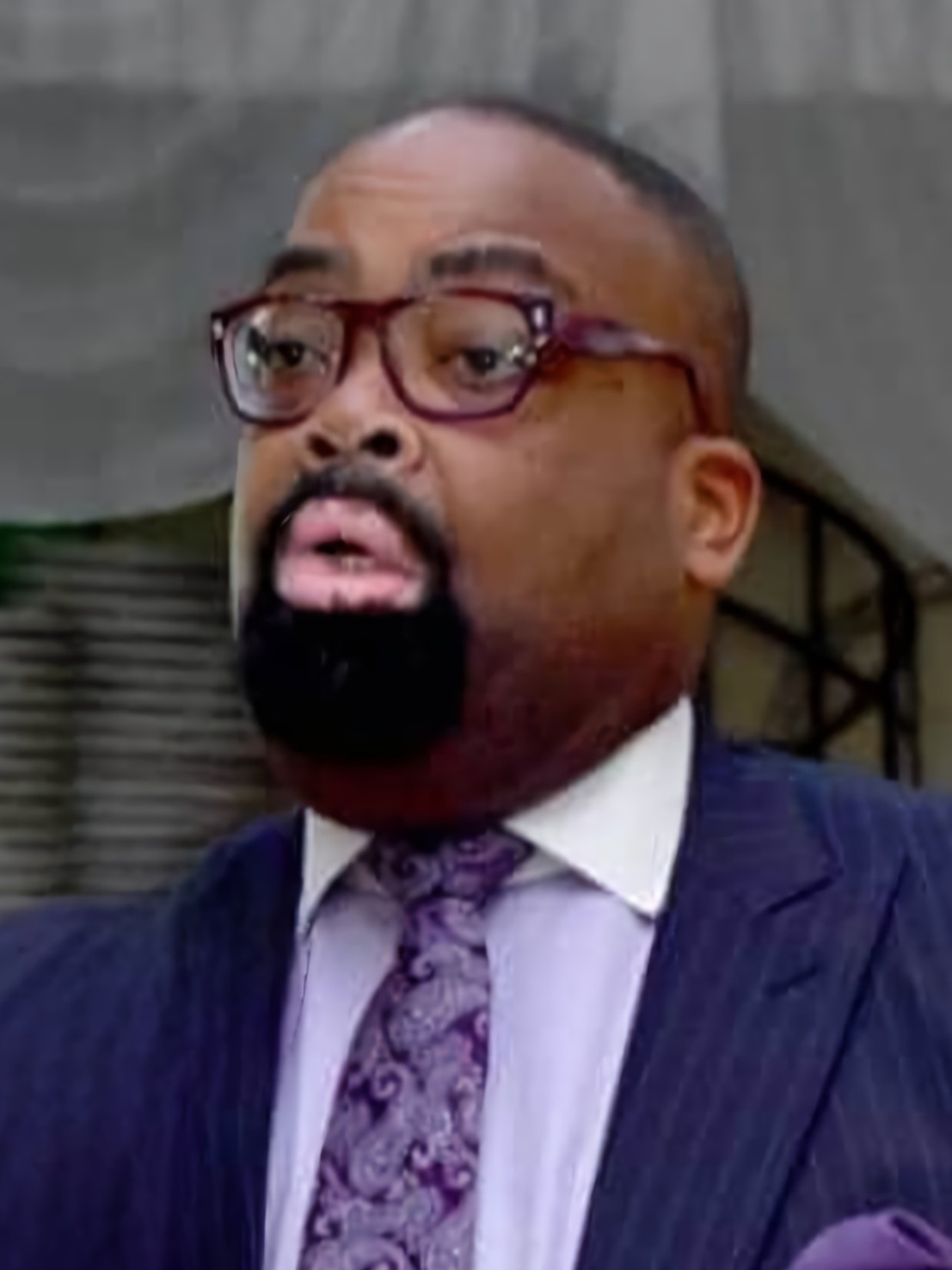
Nominee	Monday Okpebholo	Asue Ighodalo	Olumide Akpata
Party	APC	PDP	LP
Running mate	Dennis Idahosa	Osarodion Ogie	Yusuf Asamah Kadiri
Popular vote	291,667	247,274	22,763
Governor before election
Godwin Obaseki
PDP
Elected Governor
Monday Okpebholo
APC

The 2024 Edo State gubernatorial election took place on Saturday, 21 September 2024, to elect the governor of Edo State. The incumbent PDP governor, Godwin Obaseki, was ineligible to contest for re-election, having already served two terms as allowed by the constitution of Nigeria.

The All Progressives Congress (APC) candidate, Senator Monday Okpebholo, was declared the winner of the election by the Independent National Electoral Commission (INEC) on 22 September 2024. Okpebholo won with a total of 291,667 votes, defeating the PDP candidate, Asue Ighodalo, who garnered 247,274 votes, and the Labour Party (LP) candidate, Olumide Akpata, who came third with 22,763 votes.

== Background ==
Godwin Obaseki of the Peoples Democratic Party (PDP) was term-limited and ineligible to run for re-election in 2024. His tenure was marked by a shift from the APC to the PDP, and his exit from the political scene in Edo State paved the way for a highly contested election. The 2024 election was seen as a three-horse race among the APC, PDP, and LP.

== Results ==
The Independent National Electoral Commission (INEC) announced the results on 22 September 2024. Senator Monday Okpebholo of the APC won the election, securing victory in 11 of the state's 18 Local Government Areas (LGAs), including key areas like Etsako West, Akoko Edo, and Oredo. PDP’s Asue Ighodalo won in seven LGAs, while Labour Party candidate Olumide Akpata did not win in any LGA.

LGA	APC	PDP	LP
Igueben	5,907	8,470	68
Esan West	12,952	11,004	323
Owan West	12,277	11,284	285
Uhunmwonde	8,776	9,339	490
Ovia North East	13,225	15,311	1,862
Esan South East	8,398	14,199	133
Egor	16,760	14,658	3,131
Akoko Edo	34,847	15,865	2,239
Esan Central	10,990	8,618	167
Esan North East	10,648	12,522	194
Ovia South West	10,150	10,260	1,026
Orhionmwon	16,059	14,614	866
Owan East	19,380	14,189	231
Etsako East	20,167	9,683	132
Etsako Central	11,906	8,455	285
Etsako West	32,107	17,483	2,116
Oredo	30,780	24,938	5,389
Ikpoba-Okha	16,338	26,382	4,026
TOTAL	291,667	247,274	22,763

== Primaries ==
=== PDP Primary ===
The PDP primary was held on 22 February 2024, with lawyer and businessman Asue Ighodalo emerging as the party's candidate after securing 99.83% of the vote. The primary was relatively smooth, despite a parallel primary that attempted to nominate the incumbent deputy governor, Philip Shaibu.

=== APC Primary ===
The APC primary produced Senator Monday Okpebholo as its candidate. Okpebholo, a senator representing Edo Central senatorial district since 2023, ran on a platform to continue the developmental projects initiated by former governor Adams Oshiomhole.

== Controversies ==
The election was not without controversy, as PDP and Governor Obaseki alleged electoral malpractices, accusing INEC of favoring the APC. The PDP also raised concerns about arrests of its members during the lead-up to the election, and some protests occurred at the collation center.
