= Okomu Oil =

Nigeria-based company

Okomu Oil Palm Company Plc
- Type: Public
- Industry: Agriculture, Palm Oil, Rubber
- Headquarters: Nigeria
- Products: Crude Palm Oil, Palm Kernel, Palm Kernel Oil, Palm Kernel Cake, Rubber
- Revenue: ₦198.1 billion (2025)
- Owner: Socfinaf S.A. (62.94% stake)
- Website: https://okomunigeria.com/

Okomu Oil Palm Company Plc is a Nigeria-based company that is involved in oil palm plantations, palm kernel processing, and rubber plantations.

Okomu Oil produces crude palm oil, palm kernel, palm kernel oil, and palm kernel cake. In 2023, Okomu Oil's revenue grew by 26.61% year-over-year to N75.108 billion. The company's pre-tax profit grew by 44% year-over-year to N33.839 billion in 2023.

Okomu Oil and Presco Oil are the two largest producers of palm oil in Nigeria, with Okomu Oil holding a significant market share. Okomu Oil is majority-owned by Socfinaf S.A., a Belgian company, with a 62.94% stake.

In 2024, a militant group attacked the company, killed three workers and demanded 25% of the company's shares.
