= 2019 Edo State House of Assembly election =

The 2019 Edo State House of Assembly election was held on March 9, 2019, to elect members of the Edo State House of Assembly in Nigeria. All the 24 seats were up for election in the Edo State House of Assembly.

== Results ==
=== Estako West II ===
APC candidate Aliyu Oshiomhole won the election.

2019 Edo State House of Assembly election
Party	Candidate	Votes	%
APC	Aliyu Oshiomhole		
APC hold			

=== Estako West I ===
APC candidate Ganiyu Audu won the election.

2019 Edo State House of Assembly election
Party	Candidate	Votes	%
APC	Ganiyu Audu		
APC hold			

=== Igueben ===
APC candidate Ephraim Aluebhosele won the election.

2019 Edo State House of Assembly election
Party	Candidate	Votes	%
APC	Ephraim Aluebhosele		
APC hold			

=== Esan West ===
APC candidate Marcus Onobun won the election.

2019 Edo State House of Assembly election
Party	Candidate	Votes	%
APC	Marcus Onobun		
APC hold			

=== Esan South East ===
APC candidate Sunday Ojiezele won the election.

2019 Edo State House of Assembly election
Party	Candidate	Votes	%
APC	Sunday Ojiezele		
APC hold			

=== Esan Central ===
APC candidate Victor Edoror won the election.

2019 Edo State House of Assembly election
Party	Candidate	Votes	%
APC	Victor Edoror		
APC hold			

=== Esan North East II ===
APC candidate Emmanuel Okoduwa won the election.

2019 Edo State House of Assembly election
Party	Candidate	Votes	%
APC	Emmanuel Okoduwa		
APC hold			

=== Esan North East I ===
APC candidate Francis Okiye won the election.

2019 Edo State House of Assembly election
Party	Candidate	Votes	%
APC	Francis Okiye		
APC hold			

=== Ovia South West ===
APC candidate Sunday Aghedo won the election.

2019 Edo State House of Assembly election
Party	Candidate	Votes	%
APC	Sunday Aghedo		
APC hold			

=== Ovia North East II ===
APC candidate Vincent Uwadiae won the election.

2019 Edo State House of Assembly election
Party	Candidate	Votes	%
APC	Vincent Uwadiae		
APC hold			

=== Ovia North East I ===
APC candidate Ugiagbe Dumez won the election.

2019 Edo State House of Assembly election
Party	Candidate	Votes	%
APC	Ugiagbe Dumez		
APC hold			

=== Uhunmwode ===
APC candidate Washington Osifo won the election.

2019 Edo State House of Assembly election
Party	Candidate	Votes	%
APC	Washington Osifo		
APC hold			

=== Oredo East ===
APC candidate Osaro Obazee won the election.

2019 Edo State House of Assembly election
Party	Candidate	Votes	%
APC	Osaro Obazee		
APC hold			

=== Orhionmwon East ===
APC candidate Nosayaba Okunbor won the election.

2019 Edo State House of Assembly election
Party	Candidate	Votes	%
APC	Nosayaba Okunbor		
APC hold			

=== Orhionmwon West ===
APC candidate Roland Asoro won the election.

2019 Edo State House of Assembly election
Party	Candidate	Votes	%
APC	Roland Asoro		
APC hold			

=== Ikpoba-Okha ===
APC candidate Henry Okhuarobo won the election.

2019 Edo State House of Assembly election
Party	Candidate	Votes	%
APC	Henry Okhuarobo		
APC hold			

=== Egor ===
APC candidate Crosby Eribo won the election.

2019 Edo State House of Assembly election
Party	Candidate	Votes	%
APC	Crosby Eribo		
APC hold			

=== Oredo West ===
APC candidate Chris Okaeben won the election.

2019 Edo State House of Assembly election
Party	Candidate	Votes	%
APC	Chris Okaeben		
APC hold			

=== Estako East ===
APC candidate Kingsley Ugabi won the election.

2019 Edo State House of Assembly election
Party	Candidate	Votes	%
APC	Kingsley Ugabi		
APC hold			

=== Estako Central ===
APC candidate Oshoma Ahmed won the election.

2019 Edo State House of Assembly election
Party	Candidate	Votes	%
APC	Oshoma Ahmed		
APC hold			

=== Owan West ===
APC candidate Micheal Ohio-Ezo won the election.

2019 Edo State House of Assembly election
Party	Candidate	Votes	%
APC	Micheal Ohio-Ezo		
APC hold			

=== Owan East ===
APC candidate Eric Okaka won the election.

2019 Edo State House of Assembly election
Party	Candidate	Votes	%
APC	Eric Okaka		
APC hold			

=== Akoko-Edo I ===
APC candidate Yekini Idaiye won the election.

2019 Edo State House of Assembly election
Party	Candidate	Votes	%
APC	Yekini Idaiye		
APC hold			

=== Akoko-Edo II ===
APC candidate Emmanuel Agbaje won the election.

2019 Edo State House of Assembly election
Party	Candidate	Votes	%
APC	Emmanuel Agbaje		
APC hold			
