= Obadan =

Benin Empire
- Otedo
- Location within Nigeria
- Coordinates: 06°28′N 05°54′E
- Country: Nigeria
- State: South West, South East, South South Nigeria
- Climate: Aw

Benin Empire was "one of the oldest, most developed and most powerful states in the coastal hinterland of West Africa". It grew out of the previous Edo Kingdom of Igodomigodo around the 11th century AD, and lasted until it was annexed by the British Empire in 1897. In the 15th and 16th centuries, the kingdom reached the height of its prosperity, expanding its territory, trading with Europe nations, and creating a remarkable artistic legacy in cast bronze, iron, carved ivory, and other materials. The empire was established around 1440 by Oba Ewuare The Great

== History ==
Obadan came to prominence during the reign of King Akenzua I around 1713 AD. During one of the wars fought to extend the Oba's rule to the far north of Benin City, Ezomo was made the chief commander of a brigade which camped out under shade trees called "Obadan." The enogie of Obadan was made platoon commander. Thus the name Obadan comes from that shade tree where the warlords' camp was based, the base eventually becoming Obadan village and the present site of Obadan Village in modern day Edo state
