= Domingo Alaba Obende =

Nigerian politician

Dr. Domingo Alaba John Obende

Senator of the Federal Republic of Nigeria from Edo North Senatorial District
- In office May 2011 – April 2015
- Preceded by: Yisa Braimoh
- Succeeded by: Francis Alimikhena

Personal details
- Born: 5 December 1954 (age 71) Akoko-Edo LGA, Edo State, Nigeria
- Party: All Progressives Congress (APC)

Domingo Alaba John Obende (born 5 December 1954) is a Nigerian businessman and politician who served as the senator representing the Edo North Senatorial District of Edo State in the 7th Nigerian senate from 2011 to 2015. He is a member of the Action Congress of Nigeria (ACN), now the All Progressives Congress (APC). He is a graduate of Yaba Trade Centre, University of Benin and University of East London Business School, holding a BSc in Public Administration and an MBA in Public Service.

== Background ==
Domingo Alaba Obende was born in Igarra in the Akoko-Edo Local Government Area of Edo State, Nigeria on 5 December 1954. He obtained a Bachelor of Public Administration degree from the University of Benin, MBA in Public Services from the UEL Business School, University of East London in the United Kingdom. Official positions include an appointment as Justice of the peace by the Edo state government, chairman of the Nigeria-Serbia Chamber of Commerce and President of the Institute of Corporate Affairs Management Nigeria. Obende was appointed chairman of the Board of Directors of the Edo State Urban Water Board, and became Executive Chairman of a number of companies in Nigeria and the United Kingdom.

== Political career ==
In the 2007 elections, Obende competed unsuccessfully in the PDP primary for Edo North Senate seat. He later became the Vice Chairman of PDP, Edo North Senatorial District. He was a member of the PDP National Electoral Panel representing Edo State at the 2008 PDP Congress. In the 9 April 2011 elections, Obende ran on the ACN platform. He ran against Alhaji Yisa Braimoh and defeated him to emerge Senator for Edo North Senatorial District. Yisa Braimoh, during the campaign accused Obende of producing numerous false certificates. He took Obende to several courts and at the end of the day the cases were dismissed in favour of Senator Domingo Alaba Obende. At the High Court in Abuja he was asked to pay 100,000.00 naira only as charge in favour of Senator Obende for which he challenged also at the Court of Appeal but in delivering judgment at the Court of Appeal, he was equally asked to pay 30,000.00 only.

Obende said that he opposes President Goodluck Jonathan's proposal for a single-term six-year tenure. Of this, he says: "A governor comes for six years; he loots the whole treasury and goes away. Putting them in jail will not solve the problem. What will solve the problem and fix this country is for every governor and every head of state to develop their various states and Nigeria by implication. So, I do not buy that idea and I don’t think this bill will fly."
