= Clifford Ordia =

Nigerian engineer and politician

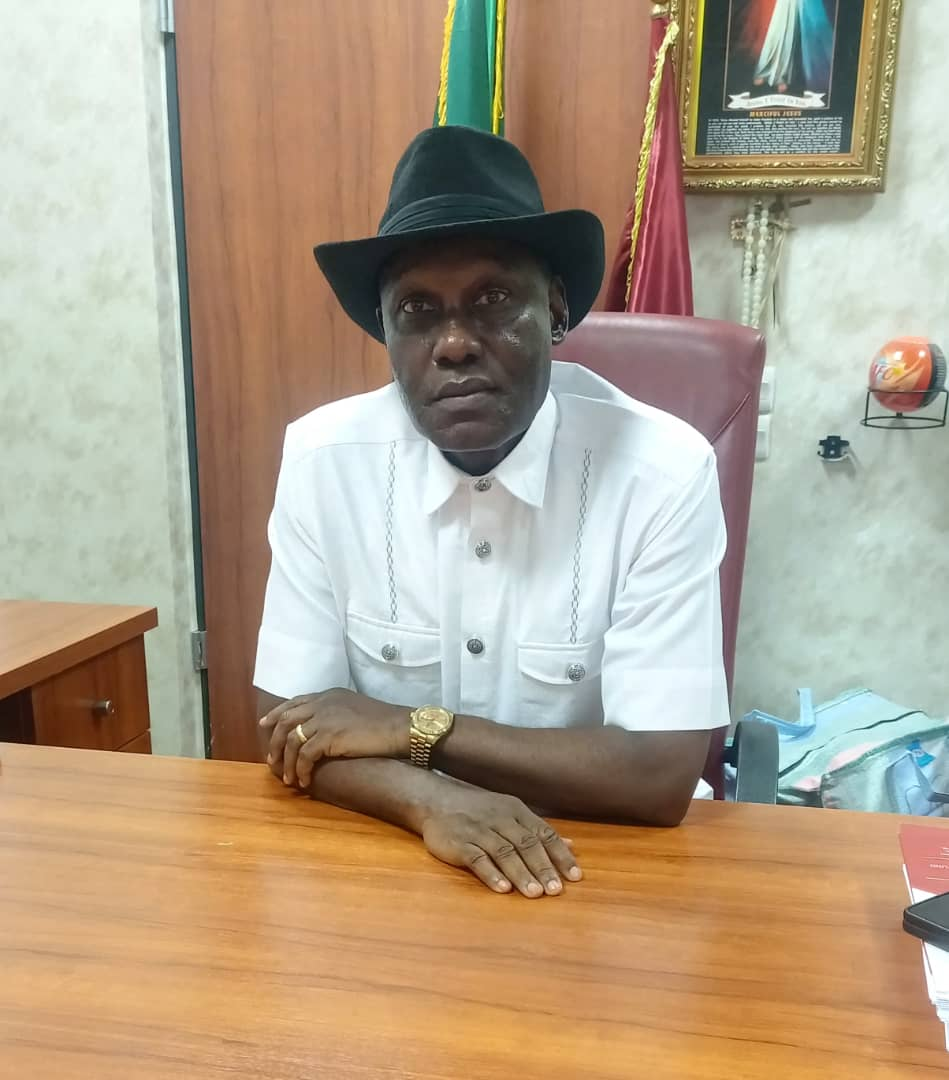

Senator from Edo Central
- In office June 2015 – 2023
- Preceded by: Odion Ugbesia
- Succeeded by: Monday Okpebholo

Personal details
- Born: 19 May 1960 (age 65) Irrua, Edo State, Nigeria
- Party: Peoples Democratic Party, (PDP)
- Profession: Civil Engineer

Clifford Ordia (born 19 May 1960) is a Nigerian engineer and politician who hails from Usugbenu Irrua in Esan Central local government area of Edo State. He served as a senator of the Federal Republic of Nigeria from 2015 to 2023, representing the people of Edo Central senatorial district, Edo State, in the Nigerian Senate. He is a member of the Peoples Democratic Party, PDP.

== Early life and education ==
Clifford Akhimienmona Ordia was born in Usugbenu Irrua, Esan Central Local government area of Edo State on May 19, 1960. He began his education at St. Michael's primary school Usugbenu in 1967. By 1973, he started his secondary education at Esan Grammar School Uromi, before proceeding to Bendel State University, Ekpoma, now Ambrose Alli University in 1982, to study Civil engineering as one of the pioneer undergraduates. He is a Fellow of the Nigeria Society of Engineers.

== Senate career ==
Ordia was first elected to the Nigerian Senate in 2015 on the platform of the People's Democratic Party (PDP). In June 2015, Ordia opposed move by the ruling All Progressives Congress (APC) to remove the President of the 8th Senate, Bukola Saraki and the Deputy President of the Senate, Ike Ekweremadu. Ordia played a lead role in the emergence of Bukola Saraki who defied his party, APC's instruction to jettison his ambition for the seat and support the party's anointed candidate, Ahmad Lawan and the emergence of Ike Ekweremadu an opposition People's Democratic Party (PDP) senator as Deputy President of the Senate. Ordia was re-elected to a second term in the senate in 2019. In June 2019, Ordia emerged as the senate Deputy Minority Whip in a shadow election conducted by the PDP to elect its minority principal officers in the senate. However, days later speculation emerged that the PDP National Chairman, Uche Secondus was plotting to replace Ordia with Sahabi Yau.

Ordia was replaced in the senate by Monday Okpebholo, who won the 2023 Edo Central senatorial elections.

== Bills and motions ==
=== Bills ===
- Employee Compensation Act (Amendment Bill) 2016;
- An Act to Amend the Consumer Protection Council Act Cap C25 LFN 2004;
- Environment Impact Assessment Act Cap E12 LFN 2004 (Amendment) Bill, 2016;
- Psychiatric Hospital Management Board (Amendment) Bill, 2016;
- Establishment of Federal College of Education in Usugbenu, Irrua, (Establishment) Bill 2018(SB 554);
- The National Institute of Construction Technology and Management, Uromi (Establishment) Bill, 2018 (SB. 628). Signed into law by the President;
- The Prohibition of Open Urination/Defecation Bill, 2020. First Reading;
- The Clean Nigeria Agency (Establishment, Etc.) Bill 2021. Committee Stage;
- College of Agriculture Ubiaja, 2021 Establishment Bill. Second Reading;
- Raw Materials Research and Development Council Act Cap R3 LFN 2004 (Amendment) Bill, 2022 (SB).942.
- Public Enterprises (Privatization and Commercialization) Act CAP. P38 LFN 2004 (Amendment) Bill, 2002
- Automotive Council Act CAP. N8 LFN 2004 (Amendment) Bill, 2022.
- The National Environmental Standards and Regulations Enforcement Agency (EST.) Act No. 25, 2007, (Amendment) Bill, 2022
- The Nigeria Reinsurance Corporation Act CAP. N131 LFN, 2004 (Amendment) Bill, 2002

=== Motions ===
- The need to address the high rate of Flooding of Nine Communities in Ifeku Island in Illushi Town, Esan South-East Local Government Area, Edo State
- Urgent need to tackle the total state of disrepair and collapse of Ekpoma -Benin Federal Highway
- The need for a detailed explanation of the $15 Billion proposed MOU signed by the Minister of state for Petroleum with the Chinese Firm
- The need to curtail some criminal activities of the Fulani Herdsmen across Nigeria
- The Urgent need to support the Centre for Research, Control and Treatment of Lassa Fever Disease in Nigeria
- Demise of Chief Dr. Tony Okhakon Anenih CFR: The Iyasele (The Prime Minister of Esan People)
- The need to increase sensitization on the dangers of Open defecation
- Urgent need to combat the high rate of Infants deaths caused by Pneumonia in the country
- Urgent Need for the Federal Government to intervene on the failed portions of Benin -Ekpoma -Auchi -Okene Road, Benin -Sapele Road and Ewu -Uromi -Agbor Road in Edo State

=== Committee ===
- Chairman, Senate Committee on Local and Foreign Debts.
- Member, Senate Committee on Science And Technology.
- Member, Senate Committee On Agriculture.
- Member, Senate Committee On Drugs And Narcotics.
- Member, Senate Committee On Tertiary Education And TETFUND.
- Member, Senate Committee On Marine Transport.
- Member, Senate Committee On Housing.
- Member, Senate Committee On FERMA.
- Member, Senate Committee On Works.
- Member, Senate Committee On Aviation.

== Constituency projects ==
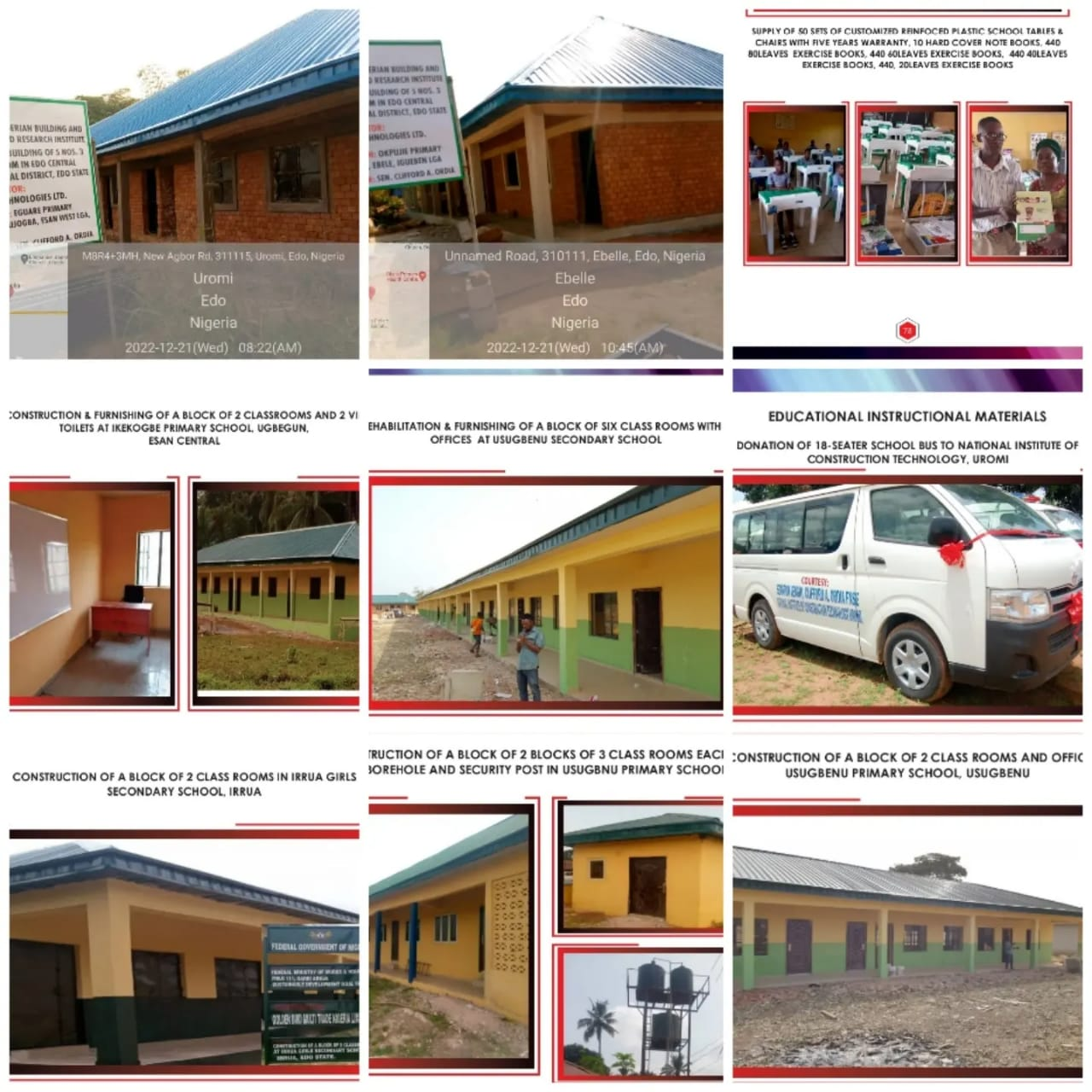
Construction and rehabilitation

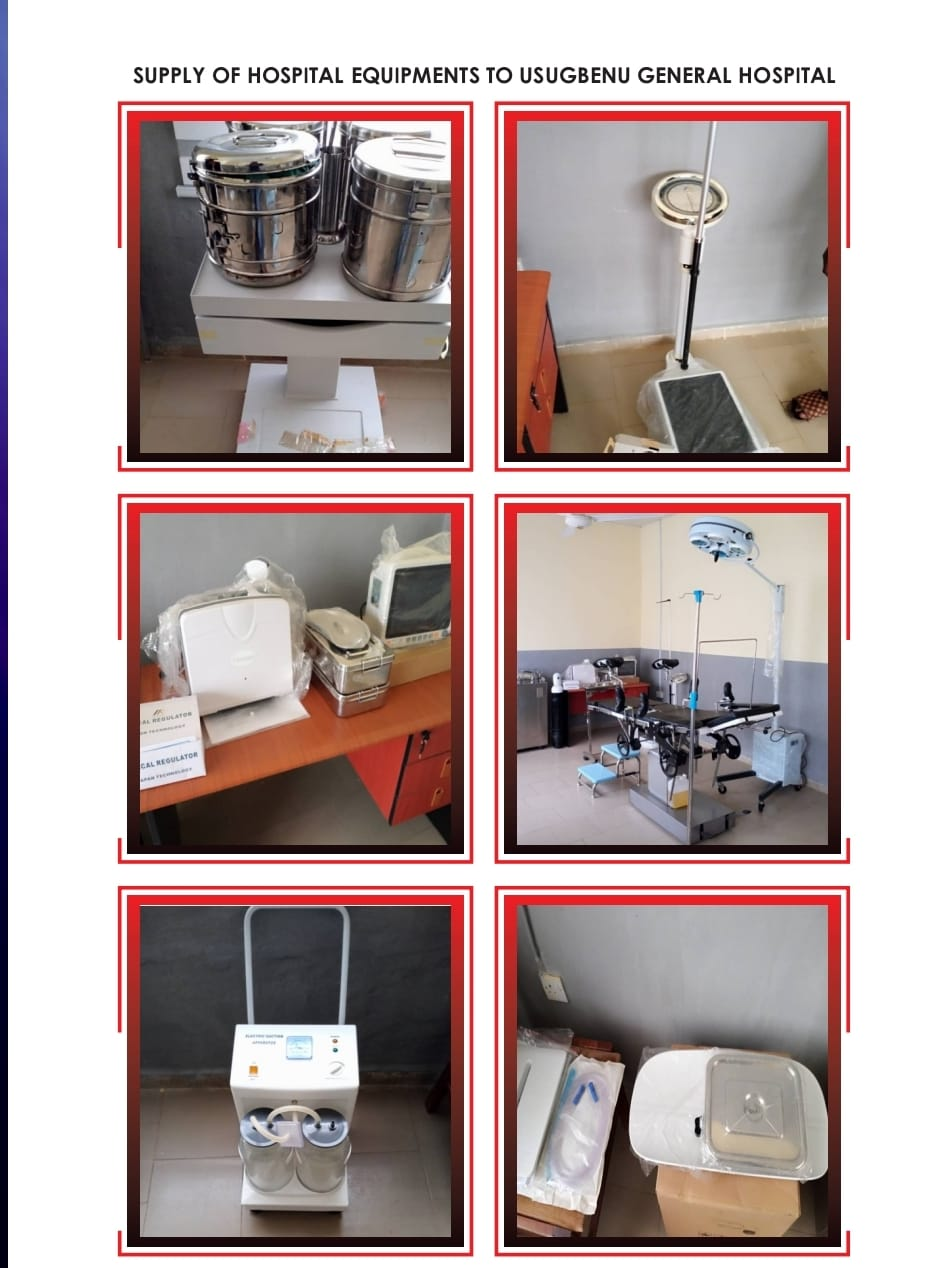
Donates equipment

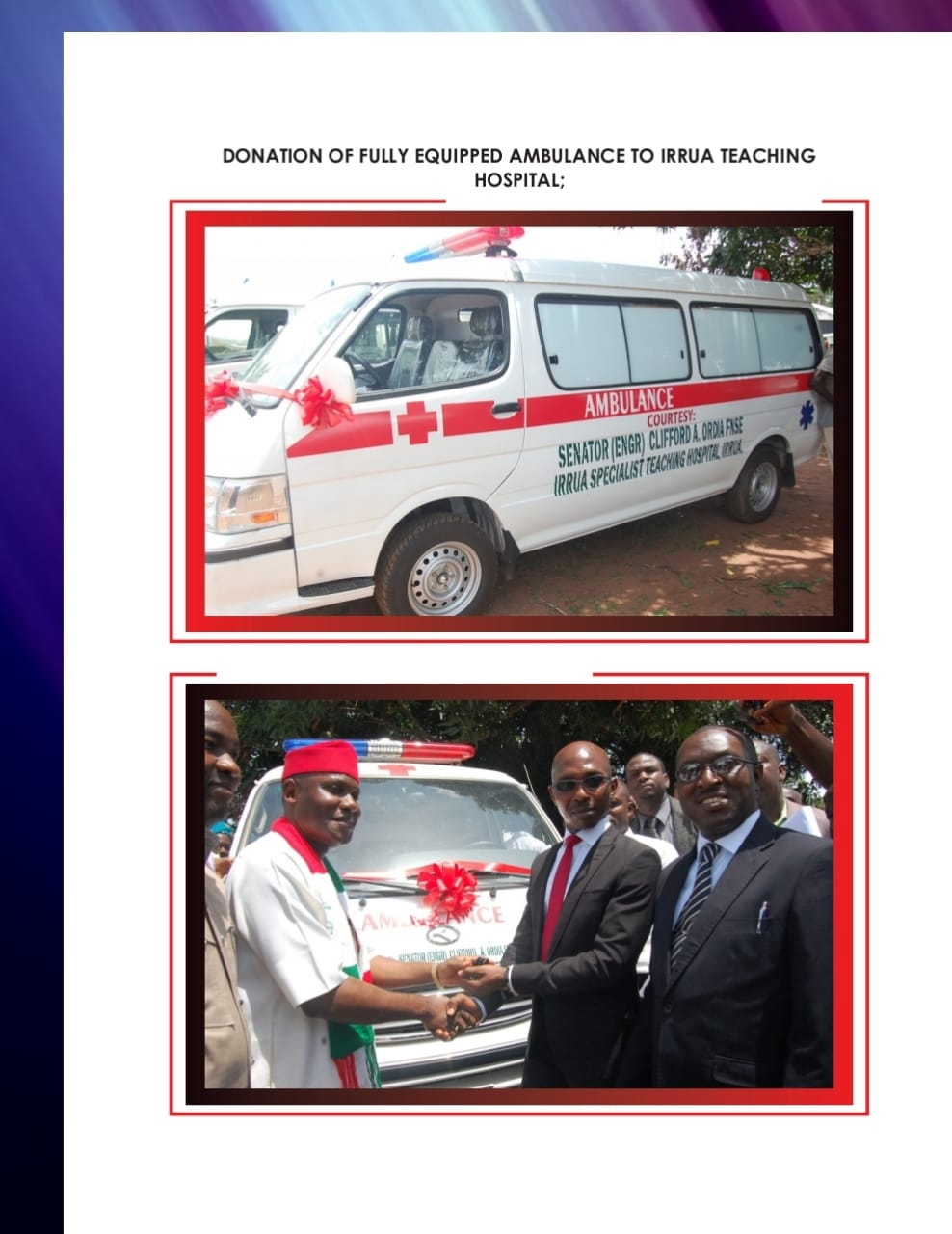
Ambulance donation

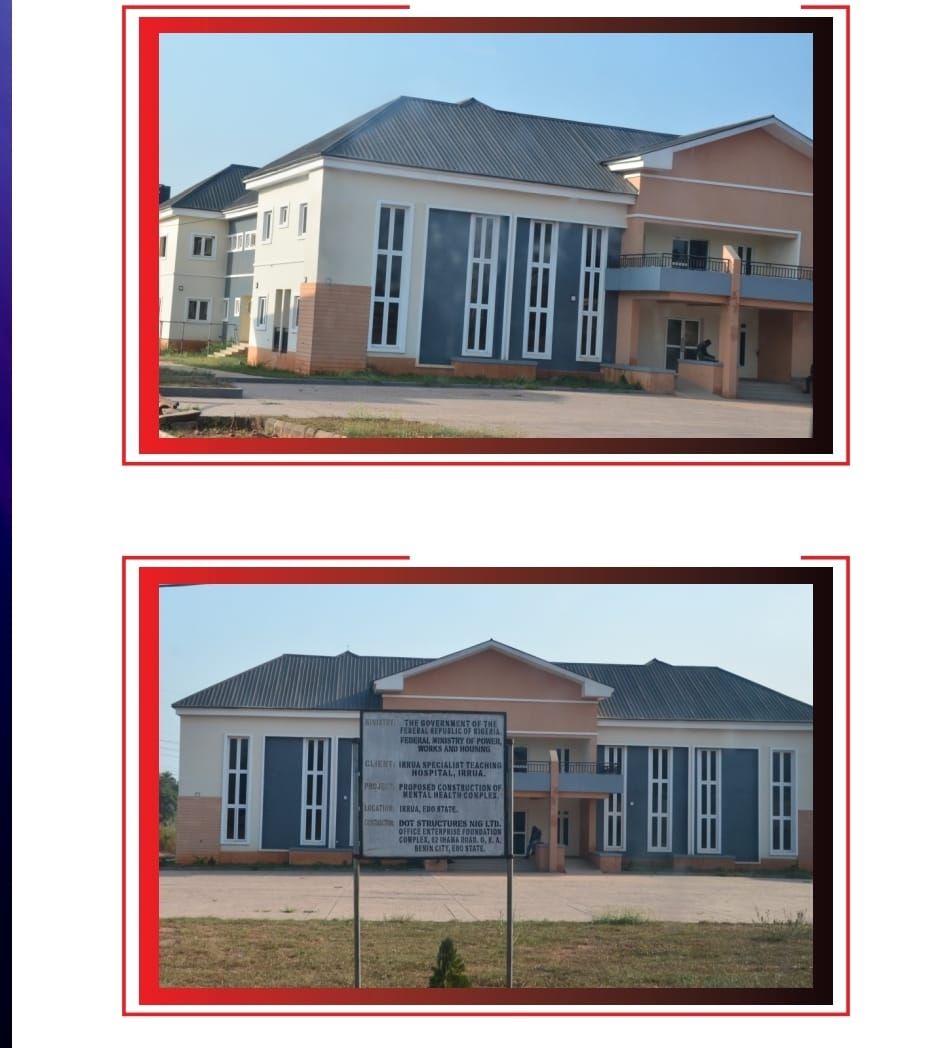
Construction

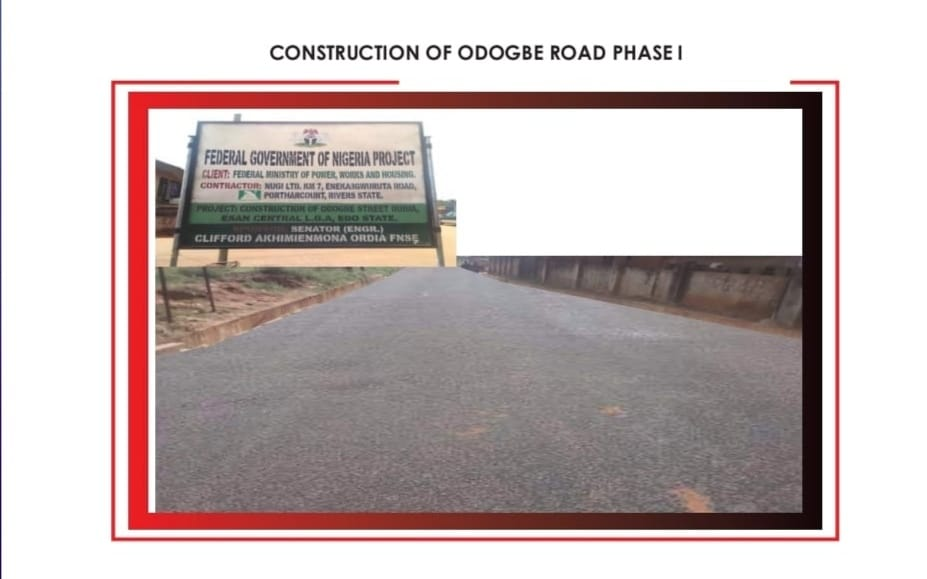
Road construction

Ordia has constituency projects spread across all the five local government areas in his senatorial district. As a senator, he did not hidden his passion for the development of his people and his country since he assumed office. Ordia alone has facilitated more than 200 intervention projects across his senatorial district. These projects include: construction blocks of classrooms, modern primary health care centers, rural electrification and drilling of motorized boreholes in different communities. Ordia also, facilitated graduate and non-graduate job opportunities for youths in his senatorial district. He used his office to facilitate numerous economic empowerment for youths and women in his senatorial district, providing them with income generating items and start-up grants to commence a viable business; the income generating items include: 80 motorcycles, 111 tricycles, 211 tomato grinding machines, 311 sewing machines, 86 hair dryers, 60 deep freezers and 60 generators. Ordia facilitated the construction of 22 roads, 28 blocks of class rooms, 7 health care centres, construction of a modern psychiatric building in Irrua Specialist Teaching Hospital (ISTH), donation of an ambulance to ISTH, construction and furnishing of a two bedroom doctors building in Usugbenu, 8 transformers, over 500 poles of solar powered street lights. In the area of agriculture, he donated over 4000 bags of NPK fertilizers to farmers in his senatorial district. He also constructed a modern cassava processing factory for the speedy processing of cassava by cassava farmers in Edo Central senatorial district. He donated 4 tractors to Esan Central Farmers Association.

== Personal life ==
He is married to an Ewu woman from Esan Central local government area. They have five children.

== Fellowship ==
- Fellow Nigerian Society of Engineers
- Fellow Nigerian Institute of Highway and Transportation Engineers (NIHTE)
- Senior Fellow IPMA
- Paul Harris Fellow of the Rotary International

== Award and recognition ==
- Leadership Impact Award
- AAU Alumni Leadership Award
- Star Prize Award
