= Edo Central senatorial district =

Senatorial district in Nigeria

Edo Central senatorial district in Edo State covers five local governments areas which include Esan South-East, Igueben, Esan North East, Esan West and Esan Central. The senatorial seat has been vacant since the swearing in of Monday Okpebholo as governor of Edo State on 12 November 2024.

== List of senators representing Edo Central ==
| Senator | Party | Year | Assembly |
|---|---|---|---|
| Oserheimen Osunbor | PDP | 1999–2007 | 4th 5th |
| Odion Ugbesia | PDP | 2007–2015 | 6th 7th |
| Clifford Ordia | PDP | 2015–2023 | 8th 9th |
| Monday Okpebholo | APC | 2023–2024 | 10th |
| Vacant | | 2024–present | 10th |
