= Yisa Braimoh =

Nigerian politician

Senator of the Federal Republic of Nigeria from Edo North Senatorial District
- In office 29 May 2007 – May 2011
- Preceded by: Victor Oyofo
- Succeeded by: Domingo Alaba Obende

Personal details
- Born: 12 August 1942 (age 83) Edo State, Nigeria
- Party: People's Democratic Party (PDP)

Yisa Braimoh (born 12 August 1942) is a Nigerian politician who served as the senator representing the Edo North Senatorial District of Edo State in the Nigerian senate from 2007 to 2011. He is a member of the People's Democratic Party (PDP).

Braimoh was educated as an engineer at the University of Western Ontario, Ontario Canada (1982), Cranefield Institute of Technology, Cranfield, UK (1981) and Engineering College, Penzance, Cornwall UK (1969–1970). Before election to the Senate, he was Special Advisor to the Minister of Transport and Aviation (1993), Special Advisor to the Minister of Power and Steel (1994), Member of the Board of Directors of the National Maritime Authority (2000) and Chairman of the Governing Board of NYSC (2005–2007).

His election to the Senate in April 2007 was appealed by the Action Congress candidate on the grounds of non-compliance with the Electoral Act 2006. The appeal was eventually dismissed in April 2010. After being elected Senator, he was appointed to committees on National Planning, Integration and Cooperation, Culture & Tourism and Communications. In April 2010, Braimoh dismissed claims by Mrs Evelyn Igbafe of the Action Congress who described him as a "bench warmer" and a poor representative of the people of his senate district.
