= Uhunmwonde =

- LGA
- Interactive map of Uhunmwonde
- Country: Nigeria
- State: Edo State
- Capital: Ehor

Area
  - Total: 2,033 km^{2} (785 sq mi)

Population (2006)
  - Total: 121,749
  - Density: 59.89/km^{2} (155.1/sq mi)
- Time zone: UTC+1 (WAT)
- Postal code: 301

Uhunmwonde is one of the Local Government Areas of Edo State, Nigeria. Its headquarters is in the town of Ehor.

At the 2006 census, it covered an area of 2,033 km^{2} (785 sq mi) and had a population of 121,749. The villages in Uhunmwonde Local Government Area include Obadan, Iguevbiahiamwen, Ogheghe, Igieduma, Ugiamwen, and Igueuwangue.

There are several markets in Uhunmwonde, one of which is the popular Egba market. Other important economic features in Uhunmwonde LGA include lumbering, food processing, and animal rearing.

The postal code of the area is 301.

== See also ==
- Obadan
- Igieduma
