= Odion Ugbesia =

Nigerian politician

Magnus Odion Ugbesia

Senator from Edo Central
- In office 2007–2015
- Preceded by: Oserheimen Osunbor
- Succeeded by: Clifford Ordia
- Constituency: Edo Central Senatorial District

Personal details
- Born: 28 January 1949 (age 77) Ubiaja, Edo State
- Party: Peoples Democratic Party (PDP)
- Spouse: Lily Odion-Ugbesia
- Children: 4
- Education: University of Illinois; Northeastern Illinois University
- Profession: Teacher; politician

Magnus Odion Ugbesia (born 28 January 1949) is a Nigerian politician who was elected to the Nigerian Senate in 2007 representing the Edo Central Senatorial District of Edo State on the platform of Peoples Democratic Party (PDP).

== Background ==
Odion Ugbesia was born on 28 January 1949 in Ubiaja, Edo State. He gained a BA in political science from the University of Illinois, and an MA in international relations from Northeastern Illinois University, United States. From 1978 to 1989, he was a lecturer in political science at the University of Benin. He also served as Edo State Coordinator, and was a member of the Presidential Policy Advisory Committee on Niger Delta and other Oil Producing Areas.

== Government positions ==
Ugbesia was appointed Commissioner for Information in Edo state, then became special assistant to the Federal Minister of Housing. He was promoted to Minister of State at the Ministry of Internal Affairs. In July 2003, President Olusegun Obasanjo appointed him Minister of Solid Minerals.

In a November 2003 interview, he stated that Nigeria had great mineral wealth, including gold, tantalite, barite, coal, and iron ore. These resources had not been sufficiently explored. The government had a seven-year development plan, including revival of the Geological Survey Agency, conducting a full Airborne Geophysical Survey, and improving mining infrastructure and facilities. An important consideration was reducing environmental damage. The government planned to formalize artesanal mining, training miners and monitoring their activity. The Nigerian Coal Corporation was being privatized, and foreign investment was welcomed.

As early as July 2004, Ugbesia was being considered as a potential candidate for governor of Edo State in the 2007 elections. He was the favorite of Chief Anthony Anenih, one of the most powerful men in the state, having once been Anenih's personal assistant.

In December 2007, his daughter, Omozuwa, married Iriaobe Anenih, son of Chief Tony Anenih.

However, President Obasanjo insisted that Professor Oserheimen Osunbor, cousin to his late wife, Stella, would be the PDP gubernatorial candidate.

== Senate career ==
Ugbesia (Ighalo) was elected to the Senate for Edo Central in April 2007 for the People's Democratic Party (PDP). He was appointed to committees on Employment, Labour & Productivity, Air Force, Navy, National Planning and National Identity Card & Population.

In July 2009, Ugbesia withdrew his opposition to President Umaru Yar'Adua's nominee, Jude Ise-Idehen of the Action Congress (AC), as the Commissioner representing Edo State on the Board of the Niger Delta Development Commission (NDDC), although his colleague Senator Ehigie Uzamere of Edo South maintained opposition to the appointment.

In November 2009, Ugbesia described the achievements he had made as senator in attracting projects to his Senatorial district. They included the Northern Ishan regional water project, work on the Ebu-Ahia-Asaba Road, a primary health centre with beds and medical equipment and borehole, contracts for control of erosion, farmland irrigation at Ilushi and rural poverty alleviation schemes.

Ugbesia ran successfully for reelection as Edo Central Senator on the PDP platform in the April 2011 elections.
