= Edo South senatorial district =

Senatorial district in Nigeria

The Edo South senatorial district in Edo State covers seven local governments which include Oredo, Ovia South West, Egor, Ovia North East, Orhionmwon, Ikpoba Okha and Uhunmwode local government areas. Oredo LGA is the headquarters (collation centre) of Edo South. The current representative of Edo South is Neda Imasuen of the Labour Party (LP).

== List of senators representing Edo South ==
Senator	Party	Year	Assembly
Roland Owie	PDP	1999 - 2003	4th
Daisy Danjuma	PDP	2003 - 2007	5th
Ehigie Uzamere	PDP	2007 - 2015	6th 7th
Matthew Urhoghide	PDP	2015 - 2023	8th 9th
Neda Imasuen	LP	2023 - present	10th
