= Ehigie Edobor Uzamere =

Nigerian politician

Senator of the Federal Republic of Nigeria from Edo South Senatorial District
- In office 2007–2015
- Preceded by: Daisy Danjuma
- Succeeded by: Matthew Urhoghide
- Constituency: Edo South Senatorial District

Personal details
- Party: People's Democratic Party (PDP)
- Profession: Politician

Ehigie Edobor Uzamere is a Nigerian politician who was elected to the Nigerian Senate in 2007 representing the Edo South Senatorial District of Edo State for the People's Democratic Party (PDP).

== Background ==
Ehigie Uzamere was born in the Oredo Local Government Area of Edo State on the 1st of June 1955. He was an architect before running for the Senate in April 2007, with no prior political experience.

In July 2007, an American woman, claiming that Uzamere had married her in New York in 1979 while seeking a green card, filed a divorce suit demanding $100 million compensation and child support. The senator dismissed the charge, saying he had not married the woman. However, according to Huhuonline, in May 2009, the New York State Supreme Court rejected his argument, found that the marriage had taken place, and ordered him to personally appear in court for trial.

== Senate career ==
Uzamere was elected to the Senate for Edo South in April 2007 for the People's Democratic Party (PDP). He was appointed to committees on Security & Intelligence, Local and Foreign Debts, Land Transport, Housing, Downstream Petroleum and Culture & Tourism. In May 2008, he was named as a member of the National Assembly Joint Committee on Constitution Review (JCCR). He was a member of a joint Senate committee on Federal Capital Territory (FCT) and Housing, which investigated the administration of the FCT between 1999 and 2007, issuing a highly critical report in July 2008.

In June 2008, the Edo State election petition tribunal said there had been irregularities in the conduct of the Independent National Electoral Commission (INEC) in the 2007 general elections, annulled the election of Uzamere, and directed the INEC to conduct a fresh Senate election in Edo South within 90 days. After a series of appeals, in June 2009, the court of appeal ruled that Uzamere had in fact been duly elected.

In December 2008, the three PDP senators - Uzamere, Yisa Braimoh and Odion Ugbesia - were given the job of reconciling the different party factions that emerged during the eighteen months Edo State governorship of Oserheimen Osunbor. Uzamere said that since Edo State now had an Action Congress government, PDP supporters could not expect patronage, which would make the job easier.

In a mid-term assessment of the performance of Senators, ThisDay newspaper noted that he had sponsored the Nigerian Communication Commission Act (Amendment) Bill 2009 and the Nigerian Institute of Cost Management Bill 2008.

In June 2009, Uzamere spoke in favor of reform of the Independent National Electoral Commission (INEC) to reduce delays in finalizing electoral results. In July 2009, he was accused of delays in confirming the Edo State nominee to the Niger Delta Development Commission (NDDC) board, perhaps due to party-political motives. As chancellor of the University of Benin he pushed to appoint another Bini man to replace the previous vice-chancellor, in a debate that dragged out through the second half of 2009.

In September 2009, as head of the Senate Committee on Local and Foreign Debts Besides, Uzamere supporting the move to audit debts owed by the Federal government to local contractors, which apparently included many "ghost" debts. He also called for quick settlement of verified outstanding amounts once the audit is completed.

In November 2009, Uzamere gave a talk during the opening of a Nigerian arts exhibition in Stockholm on The Benin Civilization and Its Impacts on Contemporary Nigerian Politics.

Uzamere ran successfully for reelection in the April 2011 elections for the Edo South Senatorial District. He defeated former senator Daisy Danjuma by 135,346 votes to 70,725.
