= Ikpoba Okha =

- LGA
- Interactive map of Ikpoba Okha
- Country: Nigeria
- State: Edo State
- Capital: Idogbo

Area
  - Total: 862 km^{2} (333 sq mi)

Population (2006)
  - Total: 301,447
  - Density: 350/km^{2} (906/sq mi)
- Time zone: UTC+1 (WAT)
- Postal code: 300
- Area code: 300105

Ikpoba Okha is a Local Government Area of Edo State, Nigeria. Its headquarters is in the town of Idogbo, along Benin/Abraka Road. The LGA is made up of several towns and villages such as Evbuomodu, Uwusan, Obazagbon, Agedo, Evbumufi, Etiosa, Obadoloviyeyi, Obenevbugo, Obe, Oghoghobi, Okha, Obanyantor, Ekae, Utezi, Uhie, Ogheghe, and Obagie Obaretin. The estimated population of Ikpoba Okha is about 301,447 inhabitants, with the majority of the area's dwellers being members of the Benin/Edo ethnic division.

The postal code of the area is 300.

== Geography ==
Ikpoba Okha Local Government Area covers an area of 862 square kilometres (333 square miles), making it one of the largest local government areas in Edo State. It shares boundaries with Ovia North-East Local Government Area to the north, Uhunmwonde Local Government Area to the west, and Ethiope West Local Government Area of Delta State to the east. The area is situated in the southern part of Edo State, with the Benin River forming its southern boundary.

The LGA has an average temperature of 28 °C. The average humidity level of the area is 69 percent while the average wind speed in the LGA is 11 km/h.

== Demographics ==
As of the 2006 census, the population of Ikpoba Okha Local Government Area was approximately 301,000 people. The area is inhabited by the Edo people, who are the indigenous ethnic group of the region. The population is predominantly rural, with many communities engaged in farming and fishing.

== Economy ==
The economy of Ikpoba Okha Local Government Area is primarily based on agriculture, with crops such as yams, cassava, and maize being major productions. The area is also known for its rich deposits of natural resources, including limestone, marble, and granite. The area has several markets, including the Idogbo Market, which is a major center for the sale of agricultural produce.

Farming is a prominent feature of the economic life of Ikpoba Okha with crops such as yam, plantain, banana, and vegetables grown in the area. Trade also flourishes in Ikpoba Okha LGA, with the area hosting several markets such as the Oka and the Oregbeni markets which provide platforms for the exchange of a variety of goods and services for the area's inhabitants. Other important economic activities in Ikpoba Okha include hunting, lumbering, and blacksmithing.

== History ==
Ikpoba Okha Local Government Area has a rich history that dates back to the ancient Benin Empire. The area was an important center of power and influence in the empire, and many of its historical sites and landmarks still exist today. The area was also a major center for the transatlantic slave trade, with many of its people being forcibly taken from their homes and sold into slavery.

== Culture ==
The culture of Ikpoba Okha Local Government Area is rich and diverse, with many festivals and celebrations taking place throughout the year. The area is known for its vibrant traditional music and dance, as well as its colorful traditional clothing. The area has several cultural festivals, including the annual Ikpoba Okha Festival, which celebrates the area's history and cultural heritage.

== Education ==
Ikpoba Okha Local Government Area has a number of schools and educational institutions, The area also has several secondary schools, including the Idogbo Secondary School and the Ologbo Secondary School.

== Notable people ==
- Osarodion Ogie, former Secretary of State, Edo State
