= Matthew Urhoghide =

Nigerian politician

Aisagbonriodion Matthew Urhoghide

Publicity Secretary People's Democratic Party (Nigeria), Edo State
- In office 2009–2014
- President: Goodluck Jonathan
- Vice President: Namadi Sambo

Senator of the Federal Republic of Nigeria from Edo South Senatorial District
- In office 9 June 2015 – 11 June 2023
- Preceded by: Ehigie Edobor Uzamere
- Succeeded by: Neda Imasuen

Personal details
- Born: 8 August 1955 (age 70) Edo State
- Citizenship: Nigeria

Aisagbonriodion Matthew Urhoghide (born 8 August 1955) is a Nigerian politician who served as the senator representing Edo South Senatorial District in the Nigerian Senate from 2015 to 2023.

== Personal life and education ==
Matthew Urhoghide was born on 8 August 1955 in Edo State, Nigeria. Urhoghide was born into the family of Daniel Ediagbonya Urhoghide and Rebecca Avanrenren Urhoghide. He grew up in Benin City where he attended St. Matthews Primary School and obtained his First school leaving certificate. He then attended Eghosa Grammar School in Benin and finished with a West African Senior School Certificate Examination. Urhoghide studied Pharmacy at the University of Benin and obtained his BSc.

== Career ==
Urhoghide started his public service career in 2013 as a board chairman of the Obafemi Awolowo University Teaching Hospital where he served till 2014 before retiring into politics. He was also the Publicity Secretary of People's Democratic Party. In 2015, he contested to run for Senate and was elected into office on 9 June 2015 under the People's Democratic Party. He was subsequently appointed into the Senate committee on Senate Services as a member. He is also the Vice Chairman Senate committee on Health and chairman senate committee on culture and tourism. In 2017, he was named the Chairman of Public accounts committee.

In 2019, he was re-elected into the senate to serve for a second term.

== Bills sponsored ==
On 22 November 2016, Urhoghide sponsored a bill for the establishment of National institute for Hospitality and Tourism (NIHOTOUR). The bill passed its first to third reading and was enacted by the senate.

== Benin Airport attack ==
Urhoghide was attacked at the Benin Airport by supporters and youths of the All Progressives Congress on arrival from official duties in Abuja. The attack was as a result of a motion he moved calling for the impeachment of President Muhammadu Buhari. On his arrival at the Benin Airport he was mobbed by angry youths of the All Progressives Congress. During this attack, Governor Godwin Obaseki was present at the airport and had allegedly given the angry mob a "thumps up". According to reports, Urhoghide was trapped in the VIP lounge of the airport for over two hours before security personnel arrived to ease the attack.
