= Monday Okpebholo =

Nigerian politician (born 1970)

His Excellency Monday Okpebholo
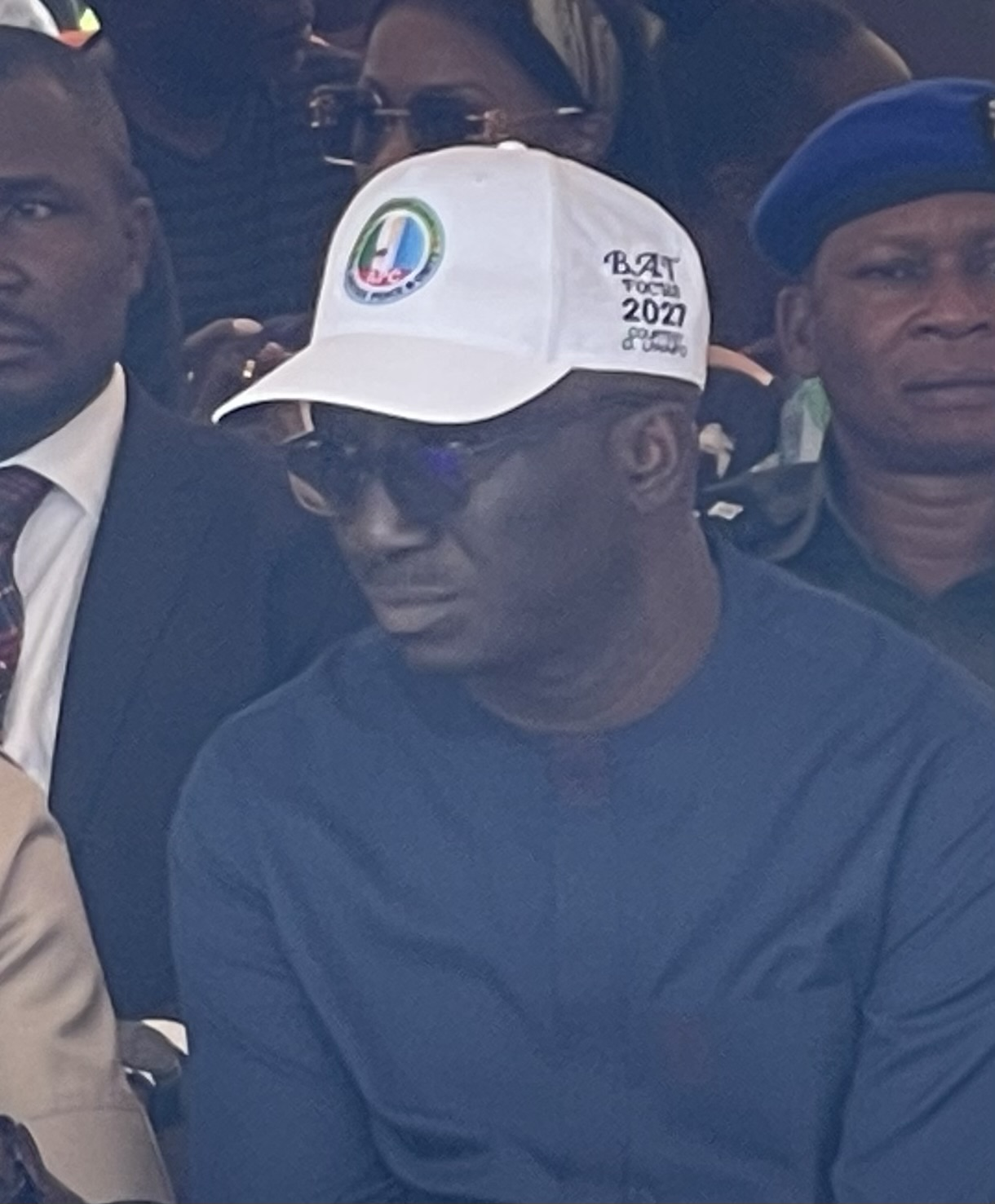
- H.E. Senator Monday Okpebholo

Governor of Edo State
- Incumbent
- Assumed office 12 November 2024
- Deputy: Dennis Idahosa
- Preceded by: Godwin Obaseki

Senator for Edo Central
- In office 13 June 2023 – 12 November 2024
- Preceded by: Clifford Ordia

Personal details
- Party: All Progressive Congress
- Education: University of Abuja (BBA)
- Occupation: Politician; businessman

Monday Okpebholo is a Nigerian businessman and politician who has been the governor of Edo State since 12 November 2024. He was the senator representing Edo Central senatorial district from 2023 to 2024.

== Early life and education ==
Okpebholo obtained a degree in business administration from the University of Abuja and has completed his thesis for a Master's in Governance and International Relations from the same institution.

== Political career ==
Okpebholo contested for the Senate seat representing Edo Central senatorial district under the All Progressives Congress (APC) and was elected on 25 February 2023. On 13 June 2023, he was inaugurated as a senator in the 10th National Assembly of Nigeria, representing Edo Central senatorial district.

In February 2024, he won the Edo State APC gubernatorial primary election.

Later in 2024, Okpebholo was summoned by a magistrates' court over allegations of falsifying his date of birth, stated as 1 August 1977, on his voter's card. It was also reported that his date of birth appeared as 29 August 1972 on his West African Examination Council (WAEC) certificate as a student.

Okpebholo was declared the winner of the 2024 Edo State gubernatorial election by the Independent National Electoral Commission (INEC) and subsequently assumed office as the governor of Edo State.

On 2 April 2025, the Edo State Governorship Election Tribunal affirmed his victory in the gubernatorial election held in September 2024.
