= List of villages in Edo State =

This is a list of villages and settlements in Edo State, Nigeria, organized by local government area (LGA) and district/area (with postal codes also given).

== By postal code ==
Below is a list of district/area, including villages and schools, organised by postal code.

LGA	District / Area	Postal code	Villages
Akoko-Edo	Akuku/Ewan	312114	Akuku; Ewan; Utua-Ufa
Akoko-Edo	Central Akoko/North	312117	Aiyegunle; Aiyetoro; Eshawa; Ogbe; Ogugu; Oneme-Nekhua; Onomu; Ugboshi-Afe; Ugboshi-Ele
Akoko-Edo	Igarra/East Akoko	312115	Igarra; Somorika; Sasaro
Akoko-Edo	Ikpeshi-Egbegbere/Atje	312123	Atte; Egbigere; Ikpeshi
Akoko-Edo	Kakumo-Anyanran	312121	Anyanran; Kakumo
Akoko-Edo	North Akoko	312122	Ekor; Ekpesa; Ibillo; Ikiran-Oke; Ikiren-Ile
Akoko-Edo	North-East Akoko	312120	Bekuma; Ekpe; Ekpedo; Imorgn; Lampese
Akoko-Edo	Okpe-Ijaja Oloma	312116	Ago-Ogbodo; Ijaja; Okpe; Oloma
Akoko-Edo	Okukusho/Central	312118	Anyawozo; Dangbale; Erhurun; Ile-Aro; Oja-Sale; Ojirami-Oke; Ojiranu-Petesi; Uneme-Osu
Akoko-Edo	Ososo	312119	Ososo
Egor	Use	300103	Agidigbi's Camp; Egor; Environ Camps; Evbougide; Iguediayi; Iguikpe; Oghedaivbiobaa; Oghokhugbo; Oviasuyi Camp; Ugbighoko; Urunmwon; Uwelu; Uselu
Esan Central	Ebelle	310119	Ebelle; Eguare; Idumowu; Okpujie; Okuta; Ologhe; Owu
Esan Central	Ewossa	310120	Idomu-Arebun; Idomu-Iyase; Idumu-Ojewa; Idumu-Oweran
Esan Central	Ewu	310113	Eguare; Eko-Ojemen; Eko-Ori; Idumuagbodor; Iduwele; Ihanlen; Ihenwen; Ukhiodo; Uzogholo
Esan Central	Igueben	310117	Afuda; Egbeka; Egbesan; Egbiki; Eguare; Ekekhen; Idigun; Idiohon; Idumakpon; Idumedo; Idumegberan; Idumo Oyomon; Idumogbo; Idumoka; Idumomon; Idumudogbor; Idumukebho; Idumuotutu; Iyekogbe; Oke
Esan Central	Irrua	310112	Afuda; Agwa; Akho; Atuagbo; Eguare; Ekillor; Eko-Akhahuabhalu; Eko-Iyobhebhe; Eko-Oguanlen; Eko-Uwaya; Eku-Obhiosa; Ibhiolulu; Ibore; Ididigba; Idinegbon; Idinobi; Idumebo; Idumoza; Idumuoghodo; Ikegogbe; Ikekato; Imaruigho; Kakulu Camp; Ohe; Okhoromi; Otoruwa; Udomi; Udowo; Ugbokhare; Ughalo; Ughenokhua; Uhaekpen; Ujabhole; Uneah; Usenu; Uwessan; Uzebu
Esan Central	Opoji	310115	Eguare; Ekhu; Iki; Ikiewanlen; Ikinaogo; Oghagbo; Okohore; Ujosalen; Uzebu
Esan Central	Ugbegun	310116	Eko-Ariofolo; Eko-Ehonor; Eko-Imolamen; Ididigba; Idumigun; Idumiyasele; Idumoeguole; Idumogo; Idumu-Ohege; Idumuele; Idumuoli; Idumuoma; Iduogbale; Iguizi; Odogbe; Ukekogbe; Ukpabolele
Esan North East	Uromi	311115	Amedokhian; Arue; Awo; Efandion; Egbele; Eguare-Uromi; Eko Ibadin; Eror; Ewoyi; Idumoza; Ivue; Obedu; Onewa; Ubierumu Oke; Udierumu Uwa; Ukoni; Unuwazi; Utako; Uwalo
Esan North East	Uzea	311116	Idinegbon; Ebun; Ute; Ukwaza; Ebulen; Ewoiki; Eko-Igene; Olinlin; Uroh
Esan South East	Emu	311108	Akhiomen; Auma; Eguale; Eke; Eko Ojemohin; Emu; Emu Ibhiadu; Emu Nekhua; Emu Orankhuan; Emu Usolo; Emua; Idi-Oise; Obodigbon; Obodogun; Obolo; Odogbe; Okede; Okpogho; Udor; Uneme
Esan South East	Eguare-Ewatto	311109	Aburu; Eguare-Ewatto; Ewatto-Ogbe; Ide Ima; Ide Negbon; Idi Agbor; Idi Eka; Idi Ije; Idi Iyasele; Idi Uromi; Idikve; Idumu Iselu; Ogbokpa
Esan South East	Ewohimi	311110	Asaboro; Ewohimi; Idi Arebun; Idi Ebun; Idi Elo; Idi Ojomo; Idi-Orio; Idumagbo; Idumagbor; Idumije; Idumisaba; Idumobo; Idumuguokha; Ikhekhe; Ikomu; Iselu; Odoghu; Ogbe; Oghu; Okaigben; Okede; Olenokhua; Omhen; Uboko; Uhaekpen; Uzebu; Uzoguo
Esan South East	Ifeku	311106	Adagwu; Ajakpa; Ajularo; Alla; Ifeku; Iyegbe; Okpatawo; Okuoshimili; Owoli; Ukpodo
Esan South East	Ilushi	311107	Ega; Ilushi; Odumu Camp; Ofuloko; Okowede; Opuru
Esan South East	Inyenlen	311114	Akagba; Edward; Inyenlen; Iyagi; Izuku; Odokor; Oka; Olise Camp; Ugbolo
Esan South East	Ohordua	311111	Abumere Camp; Adolor Camp; Eguare-Ohordua; Ibhiedu; Idi Akhanmhogie; Idi Okhae; Isiekubu Camp; Ogboligbo Camp; Ohordua; Ologua; Orekhe Ishide; Orere Camp; Orhkiebiele; Ozenyen; Uokhuen; Uvwa
Esan South East	Okhu-Essan	311104	Braimoh Camp; Eguare-Okhuessan; Idehuana; Idiobo; Ikeken; Ikiala; Okhuessan
Esan South East	Onog-Holo	311103	Eguare-Onogholo; Ibo Camp; Idi Abora; Idi Akhanmlogie; Idi Okhae; Idi Osogbo; Onogholo
Esan South East	Oria	Ega; Eguare-Oria; Ifade; Igo; Isoko Camp; Itoya Camp; John Smike Camp; Ogbokpa; Okoyoyomon Camp; Okudu; Omuakun; Oria; Thomas Camp; Ukpowada	
Esan South East	Orowa	311112	Chika Camp; Eguare-Orowa; Idi Diha; Idohin; John Camp; Okoji Camp; Orowa; Ukpoke
Esan South East	Ubiaja	311101	Eguare-Ubiaja; Eko-Bekor; Erhomosele Camp; Evbohen; Evbovobanosa; Idigun; Idohanelen; Idomehan; Idumebor; Idumogbo; Idumoshodin; Idumosoh; Idumowemhen; Igbira Camp; Iru; Lepper Settlement; Obeko Camp; Ogan; Ogbeor; Ogheyn; Oko-Eseme Camp; Oruen; Oruhen Udai; Ossiomo; Owa; Oyomon; Oza; Ozigbo; Ubiaja; Udakpa-Ogbenye; Ugbenin; Ugbo Camp; Uhe; Ukhuanlen; Ukpaja; Uokha
Esan South East	Udo	311105	Eguare-Udo; Eko-Okukpon; Eko-Ugbodu; Eko-Utomhin; Idumhuan-Khinmhin; Udo; Udo-Neria
Esan South East	Uroh	311113	Eko; Ekperu; Eneniha; Idi Ojele Camp; Igbamaka; Ocheche; Odegume Ogwe; Odegume Ubi; Odia Akaba; Odiutor Camp; Ogemeri; Okpokolor; Oku-Urom; Onwubuke; Uroh; Yesufu-Udogo
Esan West	Eghoro	310102	Eghoro-Amede; Oraede; Uwenebo
Esan West	Ekpoma	310101	Abia; Akahia; Ebhoakhuala; Ebhokpe; Ebhordiza; Ebhorua; Edueki; Eguare; Ehanlen; Eko-Illeh; Ekunalen; Emaudo; Emuhi; Enogban; Idumeakon; Idumebo; Idumegan; Idumemalua; Idumigun; Idumoza; Idumuegbede; Idumunegbon; Igor; Igor-Oke; Ihiro; Ihomudumu; Ikhin; Ileh; Imule; Iruekpen; Ogbomo; Oke; Udo; Ugodin; Uguoben; Uhiele; Ujemen; Ujoelen; Ukhiodo; Ukpenu Odia; Ukpenu-Neka; Ukpenu-Udia; University Village; Uvue; Uwehimi
Esan West	Idoa	310104	Afokolo; Atologa; Ebhoigbon; Iwere; Ofie; Otaika; Ubi; Urhobo-Alamu Camp
Esan West	Naoka	310105	Eghoro-Naoka
Esan West	Ogwa	310108	Eguare; Eha-Iyekeki; Ikekogbe; Lower Izogen; Ukpogo; Upper Izogen
Esan West	Ujiogba	310107	Ebute; Eguare; Idi-Awan; Idi-Esi/Owe; Idi-Oboh; Idi-Ogoh; Idihonsi; Oaikhene Camp; Ukpata; Ukpoke
Esan West	Ukhun	310103	Afokhian; Ebhoigbon; Eguare; Lepper Settlement; Oderie; Uen-Ejiekhine; Uen-Ogbeta; Uen-Okola
Esan West	Urohi	310106	Aghoukhuere; Akugbe-Okenuwa; Camp; Eguare; Ekhuele; Eko-Ebutemeta; Eko-Omigie; Oghegho; Oviawele Camp; Urohinagho
Etsako Central	Ekperi	312108	Agbazi; Anamu; Ape Ojo; Ape-Eshebo; Apeabebe; Apeagbaza; Apeanethua; Apeaseghiembe; Apeigadumhe; Apeigbiti; Apeikhemhe; Apeitonobi; Apeiyenagbe; Apeobe; Apeoka; Apeokhame; Apeokhumhe; Apeosimetha; Apeowegbu; Atavo; Azukhala; Itsawhe; Iviakaji; Iviakpela; Ivianke; Iviapoh; Iviegwela; Iviekhebele; Iviekho; Ivieokpolo; Ivietha; Ivionima; Odame; Odugbe; Ofurkpa; Ogbago; Oghomere; Ogochi; Ogwiji; Okpenada; Ophemi; Osomegbe; Udaba; Udaba-Azukhala; Udaba-Ikwidi; Udaba-Omodadi; Udaba-Otoakhi; Udabe-Ogochi; Ughekha; Ughenokwa; Ukpekpe; Unebode; Uthede; Utsuko; Yeruwa
Etsako Central	Fugar-Avianwu	312109	Egbadi; Iraokhor; Iruru; Ivhiaraokhu; Ivhiovhiose; Iviabhe; Iviadachi; Iviadoko; Iviagbanaku; Iviagbogbidi; Ivianyoba; Iviapah; Iviarua; Iviavia; Ivido; Iviegwi; Ivinone; Iviochia; Iviochie; Iviodeakhena; Iviokhile; Iviokpo; Iviorehbor; Ivioromia; Iviughelo; Iviukasa; Ogbona; Okoto; Ughiogwa; Ulumoga
Etsako Central	Okpekpe	312110	Amughe; Ebelle; Ikpelli; Okeko; Okpekpe; Ukhomhedokhai; Ukhomoduba
Etsako Central	Okpella	312113	Afokpella; Awuyemi; Iddo I; Iddo II; Imiagbe; Imiagbese; Imiamune; Imiegiele; Imiekuri; Imioko; Imiomoka; Itruogbe; Kalabar; Ogagu; Ogiriga; Ogute-Oke; Okhu; Okugbe; Udorho; Ugbereke; Utegie; Yelwa
Etsako Central	South Uneme	312111	Aja; Ake; Alagbette; Sabogida; Udochi; Ugbato; Ukpeko-Orie; Uralokhor
Etsako Central	Three Ibies	312112	Abokpha; Idegbesue; Igodo; Imiakebu; Imiegba; Itsukwi; Obobor; Odikiode; Okpoha; Ukho
Etsako East	Weppa-Wano	312107	Agenebode; Agiere; Anumeji; Avhiodor; Bode-Waterside; Dapapa; Edegbe; Egori-Nauge; Egori-Waterside; Ekwotso; Emokweme; Ighawo; Igienebamhe; Igiode; Ikwakpe; Ilogodo; Itogbo; Itsokwi; Ivbiare; Ivbiebua; Ivhianokpodi; Ivhioghe; Iviakpekha; Iviebua-Naameh; Iviegbepwi; Iviekpe; Iviogheme; Iviokpo; Iviomhe; Iviukhua; Iviukwe; Izotha; Oba Dudu; Obadudu; Ofukpo; Ogwoyo; Ogwozima; Ogwukpakpa; Okanawua; Okieh; Okiolomi; Oshola; Otaukwi; Othame; Ovao; Ugbato; Ughoke; Ukho; Ukpeko; Ukpeko-Agbugwi; Uzanu; Weppa-Wanno
Etsako West	Auchi	312101	Aibotse; Akpekpe; Igbei; Iyekhe; Usogun
Etsako West	Aviele	312104	Agbede; Egeuno; Egho; Odigie; Oguolla; Ubiane; Ughioli
Etsako West	Awain	312105	Amah; Amogiza Camp; Daniel Ajuya Camp; Eware; Ewora; Igbirra Camp; Ivioba; Rabison Camp; Uzoki
Etsako West	Jagbe	312106	Ekpola Camp; Ihelame; Ikhua; Imiogia; Imiokono; Ukumasi Camp
Etsako West	South Ibie	312103	Egbogio; Ibie Nafe; Iyakpi; Iyerekhu; Otegie; Ugieda; Ugiekha
Etsako West	Uzairue-Jattu	312102	Afashio; Afowa; Akpana; Ayoghena; Ayogwiri; Ayua; Elele; Idatto; Ikabigbo; Ikholo; Imeke; Irekpai; Iyamho; Iyora; Iyukhu; Jattu; Ogbido; Ugbenor; Uluoke
Igueben	Amahor	310110	Amahor Waterside; Eguare; Idumodin; Obodeko
Igueben	Ekpon	310111	Eguare; Idumeko; Idumesa; Idumeshebe; Idumodin; Idumogun; Idumuoigue; Ijeduma; Ikekogbe; Ikpedu; Isiliakor; Ogbe; Olenokhua
Igueben	Ugun	310109	Eguare; Idumesan; Idumu-Ikhialen; Idumu-Ikhinlen; Idumuadocha; Idumuneduegbe; Ikekogbe; Oduwebho; Okaigben
Ikpoba-Okha	Ogbeson	300104	Aduwawa; Agedo; Ekiuwa; Evbumufi; Evbuomodu; Ighekpe; Iguehana; Ogbeson; Ohovbe; Otene's Camp; Uroro; Ute
Ikpoba-Okha	Okha/Ologbo	300105	Ajoki; Akpe s Camp; Avbiama; Egbonodoka; Egun; Ekae; Ekosa; Erimona Camp; Erome; Evbomoma; Evbosa Ogheghe; Idogbo; Igbehimwan; Ihanomo; Ihinmwinrin; Ilegun; Imasabor; Ivbiugo Camp; Obadolovibiya; Obagie; Obagie Nevbosa; Obaretin; Obayantor; Obe; Obenevbugo; Ogbekpen; Ogheghe I; Oghoghobi; Okabere; Okanaruovia; Okaniro; Okha; Okha Inland; Ologbo; Orhibanmu; Orogbo; Orogbo Camp; Uhie I; Ukhirhi; Ukhirhi Nekhere; Umelu; Uroho 1–3; Utezi; Uwusan
Oredo	Ogbe	300102	Aakhuakhuari; Amagba; Amagba Camps; Arogba; Dick s Camp; Ebo Ogunmwenyin; Egbirhe; Ekae; Emonfonmwan s; Evbuekhae; Evbiyomwanru; Evbokuden, Evborohun; Evbovbioba; Evbukhu; Evbuodia Olaya; Evbuonu s Camp; Iguikpe; Imagbe Izobo; Irhne Owina; Obazagbon; Ogbareki; Ogiza; Okhorhomi; Okpebor; Okua; Osagiede s-; Third Camp; Ugbor; Uholor; Umegbe; Ureghin; Urhobo Camp; Utagban
Orhionmwon	Aibiokunla	301101	Abudu; Ahia; Egbhuru
Orhionmwon	Igbanke	301104	Ake; Idomodin; Idumiru; Igbontor; Obi-Ogba; Ogbahu; Oligie; Ottah; Umolua; Wire-Ake
Orhionmwon	Oloten	301102	Egbokor; Evbodamwen; Evbodogun; Evbodohian; Evbohighae; Evbokabua; Evbomede I & II; Idunmunlaka; Iguiya; Iyoba; Ohezenaka; Oloten; Otobayi I & II; Owe; Ugbedun; Ugbeka; Uson; Ute
Orhionmwon	Ugboko	301103	Agesa; Aideyanba; Ehumwin; Esso; Evbuarhue; Idumwebo; Idunowina; Iguemokhua; Numagbae; Sakpoba; Ugboko-Ugo; Ugbugo; Ugokoniro; Ukpato
Orhionmwon	Ugu	301106	Azagba; Edummungba; Emeyon Egba; Evbosi; Eyaah; Igbakele; Igueomo; Iguevbiebo; Iguevioarhionmwon; Iguozebahu; Ihove; Ikhueniro; Orior; Urhobuoma; Uzala
Orhionmwon	Urho-Nigbe	301105	Idale; Oliege; Urhomehe; Urhonigbe
Ovia North-East	Adolor	302116	Ekiadolor; Iguodia; Isiukhukhu; Ora; Ovbogie
Ovia North-East	Iguoshodin	302118	Ayedi; Iguadolo; Iguoshodin; Iguosogban; Ogheghe; Ojogbede; Okakegbe; Okhuninwun Camp; Unuame
Ovia North-East	Isiuwa	302115	Evboneka; Iyowa; Nifor; Okhuen Camp; Ugbogiobo; Ukpoke
Ovia North-East	Kokhuo	302112	Abumwenre; Emeh; Okokhuo; Okunuvbe; Ugbokuli
Ovia North-East	Oduna	302121	Abiala; Egbaton; Ekehuan; Gelegele; Ibaro; Igbobi; Ikpako; Mikotowa; Oduna; Orogo; Ugbine; Ughoton
Ovia North-East	Ofunm-Wengbe	302113	Agorise; Igezomo; Igulye; Iguosagie; Iwu; Izakagbo; Ofumwege; Ogua
Ovia North-East	Oghede	302120	Adama; Agivbigie; Army Barracks; Egbaen; Evbolekpen; Evboro; Igbobi; Igo; Ikoro; Obazuwa; Oghede
Ovia North-East	Okada	302110	Abrifor Camp; Egbeteti; Egboha; Ekenomeghele; Guobadia Camp; Half Way; Igbogo; Igueze; Igunye; Iguobo; Iguomo; Isiuwa; Iyanomo; Iyeta; Ofumwgbe Camp; Oghobahon I; Oghobahon II; Okoro; Omamini Camp; Oseminota Camp; Oyibo Camp; Phy Hospital; Ugbodun; Ugbokun I; Ugbokun II; Ulakpa Junction
Ovia North-East	Oluku	302117	Egbaen; Isihor; Iguosa; Okhumwun; Olefure; Oluku; Uhogua; Utekon,
Ovia North-East	Uhen	302111	Aghanokpe; Egbeta; Egekpanu; Gberao; Ogbese; Okeodo; Olumoye; Ugbodo Camp; Ugbuwe; Uhen; Utese
Ovia North-East	Uhiere	302114	Eko Ekpetin; Idumwengie; Igbanikaka; Igbehkue; Obarenren; Odighi; Odiguetue; Okhuo Camp; Osasimwinoba; Owan; Ugboke; Uhiere
Ovia North-East	Utoka	302119	Agbaje; Iguogie; Ite; Nigbemagba; Ovah; Utoka
Ovia South-West	Iguoba-Zuwa	302101	Abozumamwen; Ago-Okunzuwa; Aifesoba; Evboba; Iguatakpa; Iguobazuwa; Iguogun; Isokponba; Obaretin; Okokpon; Okoro II
Ovia South-West	Nikoro-Gha	302108	Adegayo Camp; Ekuremu Camp; Ikoha; Sule Camp
Ovia South-West	Ofunama	302109	Abere; Ajakurama; Ajatitition; Binidogha; Ekogben W.N.; Gbelekanga; Gbeoba; Gbolowosho; Isabemwen; Itagbene; Lagos Junction; Ofunama; Saleria; Turukubu W.N.; Zion.
Ovia South-West	Ora	302102	Ameienghowan; Estate; Evbuogun; Iguiyase; Iguoriakhi Farm; Iguoriakhi Upland; Iguoriakhi Water Side; Ikpoba; Ora I; Ora II; Osse River Rubber; Settlement
Ovia South-West	Siluko	302105	Gbelebu; Gbelemonten Water Side; Gebelemonten Upland; Iguagbado; Jide Inland; Jide Upland; Kale Camp; Kehide Camp; Lawson Camp; Madagbayo; Madoti; Ofineyege; Okadeye; Okomu-Ijaw; Okua; Saforogbo; Ubayaki; Ugbe-Sango; Ugbokua
Ovia South-West	Udo	302103	Eko-Eyuyu; Etete; Iguafole; Igueze; Iguokolor; Iguowan; Okomu Oil; Okosa; Udo; Udo-Aken; Ugolo; Urhezen
Ovia South-West	Ugbogue	302106	Adebayo Camp; Aden I & II; Agbonokhua (Ikale Camp); Akrakuan; Ekuremu Camp; Evbonogbon; Iguobanor; Ikoha; Jamijie; Nikrowa; Ofunmwengbe; Okponha; Osa Village; Osedere; Sakazioo; Sule Camp; Ugbo I & II; Ugbogui I; Ugbogui II
Ovia South-West	Umaza	302104	Akpororo Camp; Camps; Essi; Iguekahen; Iguelaho; Lakalolo; Obobaifo; Ogunwake I & II; Ojomu; Sayo; Ugbokua; Umaza
Ovia South-West	Usen	302107	Aideyanba; Iguedo; Leleji; Obomen Camp; Ofaran Camp; Ogidigbo; Ogunmwenyin; Okha; Okhue Camp; Okoro I; Oladaro; Olorin; Usen
Owan East	Emai	313101	Afuze; Eteye; Evbiamen; Evbiamen Urule; Ogute; Ojavun New Site; Ojavun Old Site; Okpa; Okpokumi I; Okpokumi II; Ovbiomu; Uanhumi
Owan East	Igue	313106	Ayetoro Camp; Igue-Isale; Igue-Oke
Owan East	Ihievbe	313102	Akhai; Ekhaieye; Emabu; Ihievbe-Ogben; Iyaba; Iyeradu; Oghuore; Okhuame; Ugba
Owan East	Ikao	313108	Ikao; Ishiegbe; Oke-Esa; Urhuere; Utho
Owan East	Ivbi-Mion	313105	Ake; Arokho; Ikhin; Iru-Oke; Kwale Camp; Ohanmi; Urhore
Owan East	Ive-Ada-Obi	313103	Afeobe; Afeosho; Afobakire; Ebetse; Ekeke; Errah; Esioriri; Igbira Camp; Isikpiri; Ivbbioghogun; Ivbeovokhai; Ivbiakara; Ivbiaro; Obugonvbore; Ofulu; Olelo; Ubuneke; Ugbovbijan; Ukpoke; Usun; Usun Camp; Warrake
Owan East	Otuo	313107	Ago-Ogodo; Amohon; Amoya; Imafun; Iyeu; Obo; Ohima; Orake; Osiekpa; Ugba
Owan East	Uokha	313104	Uokha
Owan West	Iuleha	313110	Aropo; Avbiognula; Avbiosi; Eruere; Ikpeyan; Iloje; Ivbiodohen; Oah; Obii Camp; Ogbnagun; Ohia; Okegboro; Okpuje; Ovbiokhua; Ukhuse Osi; Ukhuse-Oke
Owan West	Ora	313109	Eme-Ora; Igho-Usie; Ikpafolame; Ogakha; Ogbeturu; Oke; Ovbiokharin; Sabongida-Ora; Sobe; Ugbovbiokhare; Ugbubeze Camp; Uhiere; Uhonmora-Ora; Ukpatore
Owan West	Ozalla	313111	Ozalla
Uhunmwonde	Egbede	301115	Aduhanhan; Ekhonidunolu; Ekhoniguokuen; Ekhoniro; Ekhonuwaya; Ekhuaihe; Emuhu; Evbosawe; Igbogiri; Okekpen; Okeze; Okogo; Ugboyon; Ugomoson; Ugoneki; Ugonoba; Uvbe
Uhunmwonde	Ehor	301107	Abumwenre; Ehor; Okemuen; Ugbiyaya; Ugbiyokho; Ugiamwen; Ukpogo
Uhunmwonde	Igieduma	301110	Erhua-Nokhua; Igieduma; Irhiwe; Obagie; Otofure; Ugha; Uteni, Idibo
Uhunmwonde	Irhue	301108	Ekpan-Irhue; Irhue; Oke-Irhue; Orhua; Umokpe
Uhunmwonde	Isi North	301113	Eguaholor; Igueoke; Iguesogban; Iguomo; Ike; Iyanomo; Oghada; Okhuokhuo; Ugbezee; Urbenisi
Uhunmwonde	Isi South	301114	Ebueneki; Ekae; Erhuan; Evbowe; Evguogho; Iguagba; Iguagbe; Iguezomo; Iguiyase; Ilobi; Izikhiri; Obanisi
Uhunmwonde	Uhi	301109	Egbisi; Irhiborhibo; Obagie; Obazagbon; Ugueghudu; Uhi; Uhimwento
Uhunmwonde	Umagbae North	301111	Azagba;Evbohuan;§ Ekuigbo; Igueuwangue; Iguevbiahianwen; Iguevbiobo; Iguezevbaru; Iguomo; Ikhueniro; Irighon; Ogheghe; Ogueka; Okhuo; Okpagha; Uma; Urhokuosa
Uhunmwonde	Umagbae South	301112	Agiyamu; Ahor; Ayen; Egba; Ekoken; Ekomufua; Evboikhuendo; Ewedo; Eyean; Idumwugha; Iguosula; Ikiyete; Orio; Ute; Uzalla

== By electoral ward ==
Below is a list of polling units, including villages and schools, organised by electoral ward.

LGA	Ward	Polling Unit Name
Akoko Edo	Igarra I	Ugbogbo, Ozedi; Ugbogbo, By Co-Operative Store; Ugbogbo, Kajola Road; Ugbogbo Nr., Omokhide'S House; Ugbogbo, Secretariat Road; Ugbogbo, Opposite L. G. Council; Ugbogbo, Ofunami Mkt. Square; Ugbogbo, Opposite Ogogoro Junction.; Ugbogbo, By Lawani'S House; Ugbogbo Opposite Ogogoro Jn; Ugbogbo, Near Ashipa'S Comp.; Ugbogbo, Near Laremoh'S Comp.; Ugbogbo, Nr. Jimoh Ochis House
Akoko Edo	Igarra II	Utua 1, Utua P/S; Utua I, By Ajayi'S Comp.; Utua I, Opposite Customary Court; Utua Nr. Gadimoh'S House; Utua I, Godstime Nursery School; Ufa II, Iretoji Primary School; Ufa II, Nr Edeki'S House; Ufa II, By Ovoko'S House; Ufa II, By Omoloju'S Comp.; Ufa II, Ufa Hall; Ufa II, Nr. Adamagbo'S House; Ufa II, Nr. Adams Hs; Ufa II, Akuku P/S I; Ufa II, Akuku P/S II
Akoko Edo	Imoga/ Lampese/ Bekuma/ Ekpe	Lampese, Lampese Mkt. Sq.; Lampese, Ukilekpe P. S.; Lampese, Aforo Qrts.; Lampese, Aforo Qtrs; Lampese, Uke P/S.; Lampese, By Oloriegbe Comp.; Elekpi, By Chief Okondon; Imoga, Umar P/S; Imoga, Lepper Settlement; Imoga, Imoga Primary School; Imoga, By Chief Obanilu'S Comp.; Ekpe, Kekpume P. S; Ekpe, By Dispensary; Ekpe, Ahor P/S.
Akoko Edo	Ibillo/ Ekpesa/ Ekor/ Ikiran-Ile/ Oke	Ibillo, Ojah P/S.; Ibillo, Ibillo P/S.; Ibillo, By Chief Omoloju'S Hs; Ibillo, By Chief Giwa'S Hs.; Ibillo, Mkt. Square; Ibillo, By Oba'S Hs.; Ibillo, Azane P/S.; Ibill, O Efolo P/S.; Ekpesa, Oyengba P/S.; Ekor, Ekor Primary School; Ikiran Ile, By Alafin'S Hs.; Ikiran, By Suberu Hs; Ikiran, By Osogbo Hs; Ikiran Oke, Mkt. Square
Akoko Edo	Makeke/ Ojah/ Dangbala/ Ojirami/ Anyawoza	Dangbala, Dangbala P. S. I; Dangbala, Dangbala P. S. II; Dangbala, Old Dangbala Court Hall; Makeke, Eresha P. S.; Makeke, By Agbala'S House; Makeke, Ileteju Primary School; Anyanwosa, Anyanwosa Ojutaiye; Ojah, Oyonba P. S. I; Ojah, Onyonba P. S. II; Ojah, By Oba'S House I; Ojah, By Oba'S House II; Ojah, Ojah Comm. High School; Ojirami, Dam P. S.; Ojirami, Dispensary Yard Psh; Ojirami, Afekunu Dispensary; Ojirami, Afekunu Market
Akoko Edo	Oloma/ Okpe/ Ijaja/ Kakuma/ Anyara	Okpe, Idogun Ps. I; Okpe, Idogun Ps. II; Okpe, Palace Square I; Okpe, Palace Square II; Okpe, Maternity Centre; Okpe, Ajama Primary School; Okpe, Ajama P. S. I; Okpe, Oloma P. S. II; Okpe, Oyonbuni Hall; Okpe, Aiyeteju Okpe; Okpe, Ogbalishe P. S.; Anyaran, Anyara Ps.; Ijajah, Health Centre; Ikakumoh, Ikakumoh P. S. I; Ikakumoh, Ikakmoh P. S II
Akoko Edo	Somorika / Ogbe / Sasaro / Onumu / Eshawa / Ogugu Igboshi-Afe / Igboshi - Ele / Aiyegunle	Somorika, Public Forum; Somorika, Ekpere; Eshawa Public Square; Onumu, Nr. Ang. Church; Ogbe, Apiasa Primary School I; Ogbe, Apiasa Primary School II; Sasaro, Maternity Centre; Aiyegunle, By Chief Aliu'S Comp I; Aiyegunle By Chief Aliu'S Comp II; Ugboshi-Ele, By Eluka'S Comp; Ugboshi-Ele, Opposite Samsons Comp; Ugboshi-Afe, By Karket Square I; Ugboshi-Afe By Market Square II; Ugboshi-Afe, L. A. P/S; Ogugu, Edemina P/S.
Akoko Edo	Enwan/Atte/Ikpeshi/Egbigele	Enwan, Imiezua P/S I; Enwan, Imiezua P/S II; Enwan, Enwan P/S; Enwan, Ekpari Market Sq.; Enwan, Imiegesakor T. Sq.; Enwan, Eshekari T. Sq I; Enwan, Eshekari T. Sq II; Atte, Maternity Centre; Atte, Irhofo P/S, Atte; Atte, Nr. Baptist Church; Ikpeshi, Okhueromoh P/S I; Ikpeshi Okhueromoh P/S II; Egbigere, Nr. Chief Aliu'S House; Egbigere, Nr. Catholic Church
Akoko Edo	Uneme-Nekhua/Akpama/ Aiyetoro/ Ekpedo/ Erhurun/ Uneme Osu	Uneme - Nekhua, Court Hall I; Uneme- Nekhua, Court Hall II; Aiyetoro, Opp. Cms Church; Akpama, Opp Cms Church; Ekpedo, Ogun P/, S Ekpedo; Ekpedo, By Dispensary I; Ekpedo, By Dispensary II; Ekpedo, Imiava Street; Uneme-Osu, Osu P/S I; Uneme-Osu, Osu P/S II; Uneme-Osu, Osu P/S III; Uneme-Erhunrun, Igbode P/S I; Uneme-Erhunrun, Igbode P/S II; Uneme-Urhunrun, By C. A. John'S Frontage I; Uneme-Erhunrun, By C. A John'S Frontage II
Akoko Edo	Ososo	Ososo, Old Maternity; Ososo, Old Anni; Ososo, Egbetua P/S; Ososo, By Ogedengbe'S Comp; Ososo, Okhe Pfrimary School I; Ososo, Okhe Primary School II; Ososo, Ikpena Hall; Ososo, Uduegede Hall; Ososo, Udurevbe T. Sq.; Ososo, Ikuegbede P/S; Ososo, Irevbe Udegwa Sq.; Ososo, Old St. Peters; Ososo, Old L. A. P/S
Egor	Otubu	Asoro Gram Sch. Evbuotubu I; Asoro Gram. Sch. Evbuotubu II; Evbuotubu Sec. School; Evbuotubu Sc. Scho0l, Evbuotubu; Omo Nursery Primary School, Evbuotubu I; Omo Nursery Primary School, Evbuotubu II; Evbuotubu Primary School, Evbuotubu I; Evbuotubu Primary School, Evbuotubu II; Evbuotubu Town Hall, Evbuotubu I; Evbuotubu Town Hall, Evbuotubu II; Evbuotubu Health Centre, Evbuotubu; Aruosa Primary School, Evbuotubu I; Aruosa Primary School, Evbuotubu II; Urumwon Primary School, Evbuotubu I; Urumwon Primary School, Evbuotubu II; Ugbikhoko Primary School, Evbuotubu; Ogbomwan Primary School, Evbuotubu
Egor	Oliha	Aunty Maria Nur/Primary School, Oliha I; Aunty Maria Nur/Primary School, Oliha II; Aunty Maria Nur/Primary School, Oliha III; Aunty Maria Nur/Primary School, Oliha IV; Aunty Maria Nur/Primary School, Oliha V; Abraka Standard Nur. School, Oliha VI; Abraka Standard Nur. School, Oliha VII; Oronmiyan Primary School, Oliha I; Oronmiyan Primary School, Oliha II; Jossy Wisdom Nur/Primary School, Oliha I; Jossy Wisdom Nur/Primary School, Oliha II; Jossy Wisdom Nur/Primary School, Oliha III; Nightingale Nur/Primary School, Oliha I; Nightingale Nur/Primary School, Oliha II
Egor	Ogida/Use	Ogida Motor Park, Ogida I; Ogida Motor Park, Ogida II; Ogida Motor Park, Ogida III; Ogida Motor Park, Ogida IV; Ogida Motor Park, Ogida V; Ogida Motor Park Ogida VI; Ogida Primary School Ogida I; Ogida Primary School, Ogida II; Enina Nur/Primary School, Ogida I; Enina Nur/Primary School Ogida II; Hopewell Group Of Sch. Use; Eweka Primary School Use I; Eweka Primary School Use II; Eweka Primary School Use III; Eweka Primary School Use IV; Eweka Primary School Use V; Use Town Hall Use; Use Sec. School Use I; Use Sch. School, Use II; Blessed Assurance Nur/Primary School
Egor	Egor	Egor Primary School, Egor I; Egor Primary School, Egor II; Egor Primary School, Egor III; Egor Sec. School, Egor I; Egor Sec. School, Egor II; Tipper Garage, Egor; Tipper Garage/Market Square, Egor I; Tipper Garage/Market Square, Egor II; P & T Training Sch, Egor
Egor	Uwelu	Amegor Primary School, Uwelu I; Amegor Primary School, Uwelu II; Amegor Primary School, Uwelu III; Uwelu Sec. School, Uwelu I; Uwelu Sec. School, Uwelu II; Uwelu Sec. School, Uwelu; Uwelu Road/Uwasota Junct., Uwelu I; Uwelu Road/Uwasota Junct., Uwelu II; Uwelu Health Centre, Uwelu I; Uwelu Health Centre, Uwelu II; Police Children Sch., Uwelu I; Police Children Sch., Uwelu II
Egor	Evbareke	Udens Int. Sch., Evbareke I; Udens Int. Sch., Evbareke II; Udens Int. Sch., Evbareke III; Under A Tree By Uwelu Rd., Evbareke I; Under A Tree By Uwelu Rd., Evbareke II; Baso Int. Sch., Evbareke I; Baso Int. Sch., Evbareke II; Adams Int. Sch., Evbareke I; Adams Int. Sch., Evbareke II; Evbareke Gram Sch., Evbareke I; Evbareke Gram Sch., Evbareke II; Evbareke Gram Sch., Evbareke III; Evbareke Gram Sch., Evbareke IV; Evbareke Gram Sch., Evbareke V; Aka-Isokan Junction (Aka Int. Sch Evbareke I); Aka-Isokan Junction (Aka Int. Sch Evbareke II); Aka-Isokan Junction (Aka Int. Sch Evbareke III)
Egor	Uselu I	Uselu Town Hall, Uselu I-I; Uselu Town Hall, Uselu I-II; Olua Primary School, Uselu I - I; Olua Primary School, Uselu I - II; Olua Primary School, Uselu I- III; Olua Primary School, Uselu I-IV; Olua Primary School, Uselu I-V; Olua Primary School, Uselu I-VI; Olua Primary School, Uselu I-VII; Olua Primary School, Uselu I-VIII; Uselu Motor Park, Uselu I-I; Uselu Motor Park, Uselu I-II; Fed. Road/Public Field, Uselu II -I; Fed. Road/Public Field, Uselu II-II; Fed. Road/Public Field, Uselu II-III; Fed. Road/Public Field, Uselu II-IV; Paramount Nur/Primary School, Uselu II-I; Paramount Nur/Primary School, Uselu II - II; Paramount Nur/Primary School, Uselu II -III
Egor	Uselu II	Uselu Sec. School, Uselu II-I; Uselu Sec. School, Uselu II-II; Uselu Sec. School, Uselu II-III; Uselu Sec. School, Uselu II-IV; Uselu Sec. School, Uselu II-V; Uselu Sec. School, Uselu II-VI; Uselu Sec. School, Uselu II-VII; Golden Touch Sec. Sch., Edaiken I; Golden Touch Sec. Sch., Edaiken II; Golden Touch Sec. Sch., Edaiken III; Golden Touch Sec. Sch., Edaiken IV; Edaiken Primary School, Edaiken V; Edaiken Primary School, Edaiken I; Edaiken Primary School, Edaiken II; Edaiken Primary School, Edaiken III; Edaiken Primary School, Edaiken IV; Universal Comm Hall/Public Field, Edaiken I; Universal Comm Hall/Public Field, Edaiken II
Egor	Okhoro	Eghosa Ang. Sch., Okhoro I -I; Eghosa Gram Sch., Okhoro I- II; Eghosa Gram Sch., Okhoro I -III; Eghosa Gram Sch., Okhoro I -IV; Eghosa Gram Sch., Okhoro I-V; Eghosa Gram Sch., Okhoro I-VI; Eghosa Gram Sch., Okhoro I-VII; Eghosa Gram Sch., Okhoro I-VIII; Ayela Uwangue Nur/Pri. School, Okhoro II-I; Ayela Uwangue Nur/Pri. School, Okhoro II-II; Okhoro Livestock, Okhoro II-I; Okhoro Livestock, Okhoro II-II; Okhoro Livestock, Okhoro II-III; Okhoro Livestock, Okhoro II-IV; Okhoro Livestock, Okhoro II-V; Okhoro Police Station, Okhoro II-I; Okhoro Police Post, Okhoro II-II; Okhoro Police Post, Okhoro II-III; Okhoro Primary School, Okhoro II-I; Okhoro Primary School, Okhoro II-II
Egor	Ugbowo	Popen Space, Egbon Street(T. Junction) (Lga Council Sect Ugbowo I-I); Popen Space, Egbon Street(T. Junction) (Lga Council Sect Ugbowo I-II); Benin Technical College, Ugbowo I; Iyoba College, Ugbowo I-I; Iyoba College, Ugbowo I-II; Iyoba College, Ugbowo I-III; Eweka Gram Sch., Ugbowo I-I; Eweka Gram Sch., Ugbowo I-II; Ugbowo Primary Sch., Ugbowo II-I; Ugbowo Primary Sch., Ugbowo II-II; Ugbowo Primary Sch., Ugbowo II-III; Ugbowo Primary Sch., Ugbowo II-IV; Adolor College, Ugbowo II-I; Adolor College, Ugbowo II-II; Adolor College, Ugbowo II-III; Adolor College, Ugbowo; Adolor College, Ugbowo II-IV; Ohonre Gram Sch., Ugbowo II-I; Ohonre Gram Sch., Ugbowo II-II; B. D. P. A., Ugbowo II-I; B. D. P. A., Ugbowo II-II; Ubth Police Post, Ugbowo II-I; Ubth Police Post, Ugbowo II-II
Esan Central	Uneah	Ibore Primary School, Ibore-I; Ibore Primary School, Ibore-II; Ibore Primary School, Ibore-III; Ibore Primary School, Ibore-IV; Ugbalo Primary School, Ugbalo; Atuagbo Primary School, Atuagbo; Assemblies Of God Miss Sch., Atuagbo I; Assemblies Of God Miss Sch., Atuagbo II; Okhoromi Vill. Square/Eko-Guanlan; Ekilor Primary School/Ekilor
Esan Central	Uwessan I	Udomi Primary School/Udomi- I; Udomi Primary School/Udomi- II; Udomi Primary School/Udomi-III; Unogbo Primary School/Unogbo`; Ujabhole Primary School/Ujabhole I; Ujabhole Primary School/Ujabhole II; Ujabhole Primary School/Ujabhole III; Ujabhole Primary School/Ujabhole IV; Afuda Primary School/Ujabhole I; Afuda Primary School/Ujabhole II
Esan Central	Uwessan II	Idumoza Primary School/Idumoza I; Idumoza Primary School/Idumoza II; Uwessan Primary School/Uwessan I; Uwessan Primary School/Uwessan II; Idumoghodor Town Hall/Uwessan III; Ohe Primary School/Ohe I; Ohe Primary School/Ohe II
Esan Central	Ikekato	Eko-Iyobhebhe Pry School/Eko-Iyobhebhe; Agwa Pry. School/Agwa; Udowo Primary School/Udowo I; Udowo Primary School/Udowo II; Idinegbon Pry. Sch./Idinegbon I; Idinegbon Pry. Sch./Idinegbon II; Ikekato Sec. School/Ikekato; Ugbokhare Primary School/Ugbokhare I; Ugbokhare Primary School/Ugbokhare II
Esan Central	Otoruwo I	Akho Pry. Schol/Akho I; Akho Pry. Schol/Akho II; Eguare Pri. School/Eguare I; Eguare Pri. School/Eguare II; Eguare Pri. School/Eguare III; Usenu Pry. School/Usenu; Ididigba Pry. School/Ididigba I; Ididigba Pry. School/Ididigba II
Esan Central	Otoruwo II	Usugbenu Pry. School/Usugbenu I; Usugbenu Pry. School/Usugbenu II; Usugbenu Pry. School/Usugbenu III; Irrua Girls' Sec. Sch./Irrua; Idumebo Pry. Sch./Idumebo I; Idumebo Pry. Sch./Idumebo II; Uwenujie Pry School/Uwenujie; Idumabi Square/ Idumabi
Esan Central	Ewu I	Uzogholo Pry. Sch./Uzogholo I; Uzogholo Pry. Sch./Uzogholo II; Uzogholo Pry. Sch./Uzogholo III; Ehanlen Pry. Sch./Ehanlen I; Ehanlen Pry. Sch./Ehanlen II; Ehanlen Pry. Sch./Ehanlen III; Egbor Camp/Egbor; Eko Pry. School/Eko
Esan Central	Ewu II	Idunwele Pry. Sch./Idunwele I; Idunwele Pry. Sch./Idunwele II; Idunwele Pry. Sch./Idunwele III; Idunwele Town Hall/ Pry. Sch./Idunwele; Idunwele Town Hall/ Idunwele; Oghodogbor Camp/Oghodogbor; Ihenwen Town Hall/Ihenwen; Ukhiodo Pry Sch./Ukhiodo; Eguare Pry. Sch./Eguare I
Esan Central	Opoji	Eguare, Pry. Sch./Eguare II; Euare Grammar Sch./Opoji; Iki Pry. Sch./Iki- I; Iki Pry. Sch./Iki- II; Oghagbo Pry. School/Oghagbo I; Oghagbo Pry. School/Oghagbo II; Okhore Pry. Sch./Okhore; Ikienwanlen Pry Sch./Ikiewanlen; Ujosanlen Pry Sch. /Ujosanlen
Esan Central	Ugbegun	Eguare Pry. School/Eguare I; Eguare Pry. School/Eguare II; Eguare Pry. School/Eguare III; Ikekogbe Pry. School/Ikekogbe; Ukpughele Pry. Sch/ Ukpughele; Umenlen Pry. Sch./Umenlen Ehoh Ehonor And Environs; Umenlen Pry. Sch./Umenlen Idumu-Iyo And Environs; Former L. A. Pry. Sch. Idumu-Iyala And Environs; Adult School, Idumu-Ughulu, Odoghe, Idumu-Oli And Environs; Ebudin Pry. Sch./Ebudin I; Ebudin Pry. Sch./Ebudin II; Ebudin Pry. Sch./Iguizi
Esan North East	Egbele	Uromi- Egbele Pry School I; Uromi-Egbele Primary School II; Uromi-Egbele Primary School III; Uromi- Afuda Primary School I; Uromi- Afuda Primary School II; Uromi- Afuda Primary School III; Uromi- Unuwazi Primary School I; Uromi Unuwazi Primary School II; Uromi-Utako Primary School I; Uromi-Utako Primary School II
Esan North East	Obeidu	Uromi-Obeidu Pry School I; Uromi-Obeidu Pry School II; Uromi-Obeidu Pry School III; Uromi-Obeidu Pry School IV; Uromi - Obeidu Pry School V; Uromi - Ivue Primary School I; Uromi - Ivue Primary School II; Uromi - Ivue Primary School III; Uromi - Ivue Primary School IV
Esan North East	Arue	Uromi-Eroh Primary School I; Uromi-Eroh Primary School II; Uromi-Eroh Primary School III; Uromi- Arue Primary School I; Uromi- Arue Primary School II; Uromi- Arue Primary School III; Uromi- Uzenema Primary School I; Uromi- Uzenema Primary School II; Uromi- Uzenema Primary School III; Uromi- Uzenema Primary School IV
Esan North East	Uelen/ Okugbe	Uromi-Eguare Primary School; Uromi- Okpujie Primary School I; Uromi- Okpujie Primary School II; Uromi- Okpujie Primary School III; Urom- Okpujie Primary School IV; Uromi- Okpujie Primary School V; Urom- Okpujie Primary School VI; Uromi-Open Space I; Uromi-Open Space II; Uromi-Open Space III; Uromi-Open Space IV; Uromi-Open Space V; Uromi-Open Space VI
Esan North East	Idumu-Okojie	Uromi-Uromi Girls' Primary School I; Uromi-Uromi Girls' Primary School II; Uromi-Uromi Girls' Primary School III; Uromi-Uromi Girls' Primary School IV; Uromi-(Idumu-Okojie) / Uromi Girls' Primary; Uromi- (Uwalor -Oke / Igbo) Uromi Girls' Pry. Sch. (Uwalor - Oke / Igbo) I; Uromi-(Uwalor - Oke / Igbo)Uromi Girls' Pry. Sch. (Uwalor - Oke / Igbo) II; Uromi-(Ewoyi) Uromi Girls' Primary Sch.
Esan North East	Uzea	Uzea- Idinegbon Primary School I; Uzea- Idinegbon Primary School II; Uzea-Ewoiki Primary School I; Uzea-Olinlin Primary School II; Uzea-Olinlin Primary School III; Uzea-Olinlin Primary School IV; Uzea-Olinlin Primary School V; Uzea-Ebulen Pry School; Uzea - Court Hall (Eko-Igene); Uzea-Uroh Primary School I; Uzea-Uroh Primary School II; Uzea-Uroh Primary School III
Esan North East	Amedokhian	Uromi-Onewa Primary School I; Uromi-Onewa Primary School II; Uromi-Iruele Primary School; Uromi - Awo Primary School I; Uromi - Awo Primary School II; Uromi-Ukoni Primary School I; Uromi-Ukoni Primary School II; Uromi-Ukoni Primary School III; Uromi-Ukoni Primary School IV; Uromi- Amedokhian Primary School I; Uromi- Amedokhian Primary School II; Uromi- Amedokhian Primary School III; Uromi- Amedokhian Primary School IV; Uromi-Ikeken Primary School
Esan North East	Efandion	Efandion -Old Oniha Primary School; Efandion - Id. Ague Primary School I; Efandion - Id. Ague Primary School II; Efandion-Id Obodo Primary School I; Efandion-Id Obodo Primary School II; Efandion-Atani Primary School
Esan North East	Uwalor	Uwalor-Uwalor Primary School I; Uwalor-Uwalor Primary School II; Uwalor-Id Egbiremonlen Primary School I; Uwalor-Id Egbiremonlen Primary School II; Uwalor- Ewoyi Primary School I; Uwalor- Ewoyi Primary School II
Esan North East	Ewoyi	Ewoyi - Ewoyi Primary School Uromi -I; Ewoyi - Ewoyi Primary School II; Ewoy - Ewoyi Primary School III; Ewoy - Ewoyi Primary School IV; Ewoyi- A Fuda Primary School V; Ewoyi - Afuda Primary School VI; Ewoyi - Afuda Primary School VII; Ewoyi - Ewoyi Primary School VIII; Ewoyi - Ewoyi Primary School IX
Esan North East	Ubierumu	Ubierumu-Id Nama Primary School I; Ubierumu- Id Isaba Primary School II; Ubierumu- Ubierumu - Uwa Pry. School; Ubieumu - Idumoza Primary School I; Ubierumu - Idumoza Primary School II; Ubierumu-Idumoza Primary School III; Ubierumu - Eko- Ibadin Primary School
Esan South East	Ewohimi I	Ohaekpen/Omhen/Olenokhua-Eguare P/S; Ogbe/Id Ogho-Id, Ogbe Primary School; Idirio - Idirio P/Sch.; Id. Agho I- Okaigben P/School; Id. Agho II - Okaigben P/Sch.; Iselu Qrts/Ikemhen/Uhie Ologhe P/School; Eho/Akha/Ologhe-Ologhe P/School; Id. Uguokha- Id. Uguokhap/School; Uzebu -Uzebu P/School; Idumoboh-Okaigben Secondary School; Idumijie - Idumijie Primary School
Esan South East	Ewohimi II	Ozogua/Id. Oliha Oghu Primary School; Izumen / Id Isaba/Ikhekhe Oghu Primary School; Izumen/Id. Isaba/Ikhekhe - Edo Lib. Building; Id. Agbor I/II - Id Agbor Primary School; Okede Omon I / II-Okede Primary School; Okede Udoh- Okede Primary School; Odedeghe/Ikeken/ Azagba / Ikeken Pri. Sch.; Id. Ikepiden/Ikeken/Id. Ugboka/Ikeke II-Ikeken P/S; Id. Oge/Id. Edohe/Id. Eiken/Id. Eghe-Agadada Sec. School.; Id. Oge/Id. Edohe/Id. Eiken/Id. Eghe-Agadada Sec. School
Esan South East	Ewatto	Eguare/Idumijie-Eguare P/School; Idinselu/Idinegbon-Eguare Pri/School I; Idinselu/Idinegbon - Eguare Pri. School II; Idumu-Iyasele/Id. Uromi-Id. Iyasele Pri. School; Uwabhuru/Abhuru/Kwale Camp-Abhuru Pr. Sch; Idinwe I/II - Idinwe Pri. School; Id. Agbor/Ogbokpa-Id Agbor Pri. School; Egua-Oliha I/Egua II/Idumobo/Uhomoebho- Uhomoebho Primary School; Okpo/Ikhekhe - Uhomoebho Primary School; Iduman/Id. Eka - Ewatto Gramm. School
Esan South East	Ohordua	Eguare-Uokhuen/Odogbo I/II- Eguare Pri. Sch.; Ogbenekhua I/II - Eguare Pri. School; Id. Abiebhor/Id Emu/Inigun I/II- Uokhuen Pr. Sch; Abumere I/II/Akpoza- Shade In Abumere Arena; Ozenyen I/II And III- Former Nod School; Id. Okela / Ikugbe/ Orekhiebhie Odua Pri. Sch.; Urina I / II - Former L. A. School; Id. Okun/Ibhiedu/Id. Otie I/II - Ibhiedu Pri. Sch.; Ikugbe - Ibhiedu Pri. School; Ibhiedu, Bhiedu Primary School; Ologua I And II, Ologua Primary School
Esan South East	Ubiaja I	Eguare, Ikogbe I/II - Central Primary School; Main Eguare- Central Primary School; Eguare, Ikogbe I/II - Central Pri. School Main Eguare; Main Eguare II/Ukpole- Central Pri. School; Eguare I/II - Central Pri. School; Gra, - Council Hall, Gra; Main Ebhuru I/II/Comm Avenue/-Edo Lib Building; Ukoha/Orhuen- Orhuen Primary School; Ogbeni I/II -Obiaza Girls' School; Oyomon I/II - Sacred Heart Dem. School; Oyomon I And II, Sacred Heart Dem; Id. Oweme/Id. Ogbebor/Iguisi/Id Ehan/Id Osodin - Oghenyen Primary School I; Id. Oweme/Id. Ogbebor/Iguisi/Id. Ehan/Id. Osodin Oghenyen Primary School II
Esan South East	Ubiaja II	Id. Oghu/Uhe/Id. Ebon Ogheyen Primary School I; Id. Oghu/Uhe/Id. Ebon Ogheyen Primary School II; Id. Ohanlen/Hausa Qrts/Ukpaja, Ukpaja Primary School I; Id. Ohanlen/Hausa Qrts/Ukpaja, Ukpaja Pri Mary School II; Ukhuan Len, Ukhuanlen Primary School; Ahia, Ahia Primary School I; Ahia, Ahia Primary School II; Udakpa, Udakpa Primary School; Eko-Oghenyen, Eko-Oghenyen Primary School; Eko-Obekor, Eko-Obekor Primary School
Esan South East	Illushi I	Eguare/Igoh/Uhole, Oria Primary School; Ogbokpa I And II, Oria Primary School; Omakun/Asin/Alfred Okoyomon/Ugboha Camps/Eko-Oria Primary School; Eguare Onogholo/Id. Osogbo/Id. Ewele/Ibo Camps, Onogholo Primary School I; Eguare Onogholo/Id. Osogbo/Id. Ewele/Ibo Camps, Onogholo Primary School II; Idieke/Efuefe/Ocheche/Ajam Uroh Primary School; Atowo Shade Opposite Elder Mail; Idegwume/Okpuliu Okpokporo Primary School
Esan South East	Illushi II	Okwoshimili/Onyma/Adagu/Iyegbi/Owon Ifeku Island Primary School; Ukpodo/Allah Shade In Allan; Okpatawoh, Okpatowo Town Hall; Esan Qrts I And II/Ozigono Old Court Hall; Niger Bank Pry School; Esan Qrts I And II, Niger Bank Primary School
Esan South East	Ugboha	Eguare Ukato, Court Hall Eguare; Eguare Nonkhua/Eguare Nonkotor, Old La. Sch. Eguare; Idumu Abekhae/Id. Eneman Izenebi/Afuda/Id. Oso/Id. Ihaza Emaudo Primary School; Idasun/Id. Abu, Adava Primary School; Ohumede/Id. Aneni/Ukboke Egbene/Uion St. Francis Catholic School; Odagbor/Oyomon, Old L. A. School; Akubor Esogba, Old L. A. School; Amalo/Anemene/Eko-Odomu, Amal Primary School; Abugho/Id. Ologho/Id. Oke/Idegun, Uzogbon Primary School; Id. Esan/Eghe/Emule/Id Neka/Eko-Ogbeide Main Otokhimhin Pry. School
Esan West	Ogwa	Ogwa - Ukpogo Primary School I; Ogwa -Ukpogo Primary School II; Ogwa - Ughe Square; Ogwa - Apostolic School; Ogwa - Equare Primary School I; Ogwa - Equare Primary School II; Ogwa- Idumigie Ughe; Ogwa - Lower - Izogen I; Ogwa- Upper - Izogen II; Ogwa - Court Hall
Esan West	Ujiogba	Ujiogba - Ujiogba Sec. Sechool; Ujiogba - Eguare Primary School I; Ujiogba - Eguare Primary School II; Ujiogba - Ukpato Primary School I; Ujiogba - Ukpato Primary School II; Ujiogba - Id Oboh Uniogba I; Ujiogba - Id Oboh Uniogba II; Ujiogba - Oakhina Camp; Ujiogba - Ebutte (Ujiogba)
Esan West	Egoro/Idoa/Ukhun	Idoa-Idoa Primary School; Ukhun - Ukhun Primary School; Ukhun - Farm Settlement; Egoro- Egoro Naoka Primary School I; Egoro - Egoro Naoka Primary School II; Egoro -Eguare Primary School I; Egoro - Amede Primary School II; Egoro - Ikhidue Hall; Egoro - Ore Ede-Ole
Esan West	Emaudo/ Eguare/ Ekpoma	Ekpoma - Emiala Primary School I; Ekpoma - Emiala Primary School II; Ekpoma - Emiala Primary School III; Ekpoma - Uwenlebo Town Hall; Ekpoma Eguare Primary School I; Ekpoma Eguare Primary School II; Ekpoma Eguare Primary School III; Ekpoma Eguare Primary School IV; Ekpoma - Uwendova Primary School I; Ekpoma - Uwendova Primary School II; Ekpoma - Uwendova Primary School III; Ekpoma - Ukpughele Primary School IV; Ekpoma - School Of Agric; Ekpoma - Emaudo Primary School I; Ekpoma- Emaudo Primary School II; Ekpoma - Emaudo Primary School III
Esan West	Ihunmudumu/Idumebo/Uke/Ujemen	Ihumudumu - Ihumudumu Primary School I; Ihumudumu - Ihumudumu Primary School II; Ihumudumu - Ihumudumu Primary School III; Uke - Uke Primary School; Idumebo - Idumebo Primary School I; Idumebo - Idumebo Primary School II; Ujeme - Ujeme Primary School I; Ujeme - Ujeme Primary School II; Ujeme - Ujeme Primary School III; Ujeme - Ujeme Primary School IV
Esan West	Iruekpen	Iruekpen - Abia Primary School I; Iruekpen - Abia Primary School II; Iruekpen- Central Primary School I; Iruekpen- Central Primary School II; Iruekpen- Central Primary School III; Iruekpen - Ogbomoide Primary School I; Iruekpen - Ogbomoide Primary School II; Iruekpen - Ogbomoide Primary School III; Iruekpen - Ughodin Primary School I; Iruekpen - Ughodin Primary School II; Iruekpen - Iruekpen Gram. School I; Iruekpen - Iruekpen Gram. School II; Iruekpen - Iruekpen Gram. School III
Esan West	Emuhi/ Ukpenu/ Ujoelen/Igor	Emuhi - Emuhi Primary School; Emuhi - Uvue Town Hall I; Emuhi - Uvuetown Hall II; Igor - Igor Primary School; Emuhi - Udo-Eki Primary School; Emuhi - Idumunegbon Town Hall; Ukpenu - Ukpenu Primary School I; Ukpenu - Ukpenu Primary School II; Ukpenu - Ukpenu Primary School III; Ukpenu - Ukpenu Town Hall; Ukpenu - Cosmopolitan School; Ukpenu -Ukpenu Ese Town Hall I; Ukpenu -Ukpenu Ese Town Hall II; Ujoelen - Ujoelen Primary School I; Ujoelen - Ujoelen Primary School II; Ujoelen - Ugha Square (Uke. Jun.)
Esan West	Urohi	Urohi - Eguare Primary School I; Urohi - Eguare Primary School II; Urohi - Urohi Primary School; Urohi - Ohon Urohi Hall; Urohi - Ebhokhure Hall; Urohi - Ebutte- Metta Camp; Urohi - Ohogho Primary School; Urohi - Eko - Omigie Primary School; Urohi - Okenuwa Primary School
Esan West	Uhiele	Ebhoakhuale, Ebhokhu - Ebhoakuale Primary School; Uhiele -Uhiele Gram. School I; Uhiele -Uhiele Gam. School II; Uhiel - Uhiele P/S Ebhodiza; Uhiele - Ehalen Primary School; Uhiele - Ukpoke Primary School; Uhiele - Idumigun Primary School; Uhiele - Idumigun Town Hall I; Uhiele - Idumigun Town Hall II; Uhiele -Ikhiro Town Hall; Uhiele - Ebhoakhuale Primary School
Esan West	Illeh/Eko-Ine	Illeh -Illeh Primary School; Illeh - Uwene Town Hall; Illeh - Imule Primary School I; Illeh - Imule Primary School II; Illeh - Imule Primary School III; Illeh - Idiamiakun Town Hall; Illeh - Ebhorue Town Hall I; Illeh - Ukhiodo Town Hall II; Illeh - Illeh Primary School; Eko Ine Ehalen - Eko Ine Town Hall
Etsako Central	Fugar I	St John'S G/S, Iviavai-I; St John'S G/S, Iviavai -II; Court Hall, Olomoghe; Court Hall, Ivioroma; Court Hall, Ugiogwa I; Court Hall, Ugiogwa II; Usagbe Primary School, Iviagbanaku I; Usagbe Primary School, Iviagbanaku II; Usagbe Primary School Iviagbanaku III
Etsako Central	Fugar II	Obe Pry School Field, Iviokhile I; Obe Pry School Field, Iviokhile II; Obe Pry School, Iviadoko I; Obe Pry. School, Iviokpo II; Obe Pry. School, Iviaveh I; Obe Pry. School, Iviaveh II; Ebidi Pry. School, Iviukasa I; Ebidi Pry. School Iviukasa II
Etsako Central	Fugar III	Fugar Mixed S/S, Iruru; Fugar Mixed S/S, Iviakpa; Frontage Of Chief'S Palace, Iviocha; Usagbe Pry. School, Iviadachi; Usagbe Pry. School, Ebadi; Usagbe Pry. School, Iviegwi- I; Usagbe Pry. School, Iviegwi -II
Etsako Central	Ogbona	Obarekpe Pry. School, Ivioche I; Obarekpe Pry. School, Ivioche II; Obarekpe Pry. School, Ivido I; Obarekpe Pry. School, Ivido II; Imakhena Pry. School, Okotor I; Imakhena Pry. School, Okotor II; Imakhena Pry. School., Iviorevbo
Etsako Central	Iraokhor	Uralo Primary School, Usokwi/Ivia-Gbogidi; Uralo Pry School, Usokwi / Iviagbogidi-I; Uralo Pry School, Usokwi / Iviagbogidi-II; Uralo Primary School, Iviugele
Etsako Central	Ekperi I	Ogidigba Hall, Adeabebe; Court Hall, Adeokha; Abebe Pry. Sch, Blk. A. Ugheogwa; Abebe Pry. Sch., Blk. B. Iviekhebe; Ikhanoba Pry. Sch., Ivianake; Ikhanoba Pry. Sch., Azukhala/Ivionime; Azukhala Ivionime (Azukhala/Ivionime) Pry. Sch. I; Azukhala Ivianime, Iviakpela Pry. Sch. II; Azukhala, Iviakpela
Etsako Central	Ekperi II	Okpanaede Village, Okpanaede I; Okpanaede Village, Okpanaede II; Iyarekhu Pry. Schol Annex, Dame; Aneruar Primary School, Ogochi - I; Aneruar Primary School, Ogochi -II; Ogbago Village Square, Ogbago I; Ogbago Village Square, Ogbago II; Otsukolo Village, Otsukolo; Oghomere Pry. School, Oghomere I; Oghomere Pry. School, Oghomere II
Etsako Central	Ekperi III	Alaoye Pry. Sch. (Old Site), Ugbago/Udaba I; Alaoye Pry. Sch. (Old Site), Ugbago/Udaba II; Alaoye Pry. School, Usemogochi; Alaoye Pry. School Field, Ikuidi; Alaoye Pry. School (New Site), Otoaki; Eshiebor Pry. School, Ofukpo/Ogwisi; Eshiebor Pry. Sch., Ofukpo/Ogwisi; Akugbe Pry School Field, Olubi/Apeiyana; Akugbe Pry Sch. Field, Ozigbolo; Akugbe Pry. Sch Field, Apokame; Eshiebor Pry. School Annex. Agbazi
Etsako Central	South Uneme I	Imasabemoh Anegbette/Imasabemoh / Unuedo I; Imasabemoh Anegbette/Imasabemoh / Unuedo II; Imiava Primary School, Anegbette / Imiaghele I; Imiava Primary School, Anegbette / Miaghele II; Naboya Pri. School, Imiava; Ugbatto Playground, Ukpeko Orle; Ugbatto Playground Ukpokwili/Ugbatto
Etsako Central	South Uneme II	Osesiame Pry School, Udochi Village I; Osesiame Pry School, Udochi Village II; Ajona Primary School, Ifeku; Ake, Ake; Ogwa, Abana/Ogwa; Anegbette, Ogwa/Abana Refugees; Imiava Primary School, Imiava
Etsako East	Agenebode	Ofukpo Primary School, Agenebode; Omoaze Primary School, Agenebode; Okpisa Pry. School, Emokweme; Waterworks Upland, Agenebode; Ogbaki Pry. School, Agenebode; Egbadu Pry. School Agenebode; Otoukwe Area, Otoukwe/Agenebode; Otoukwe Area, Police Station; Egbadu Pry. School Agenebode I; Egbadu Pry. School Agenebode II
Etsako East	Wanno I	Ukhua Primary School, Iviukhua I; Ukhua Primary School, Iviukhua II; Egbepui Pry. School, Iviegbepui; Okpodi Pry. School, Ivianokpodi; Ebua Pry. School, Iviebua; Ukhua Annex Pry. School, Ukho; Egori-Ugie, Egori-Ugie; Egori Pry. School Egori Waterside
Etsako East	Wanno II	Athekha Pry. School, Iviukwe/Iviomosi/Sabo I; Athekha Pry. School, Iviukwe/Iviomosi/Sabo II; Ivioghome Pry. School, Ivioghome; Okugbe Pry. School, Ivioghe I; Okugbe Pry. School, Ivioghe II; Edegbe Pry. School, Edegbe; Aloaye Pry. School, Igiode/Itogbo Ithuegba/Okanawa; Ijiele Pry. School, Uzanu Camps; Ukpeko Open Space, Ukpeko; Othame Pry. School Annex, Othame
Etsako East	Weppa	Adosi Pry. School, Ekwotsor; Okugbe Pry. School Aviodo; Ovuegbe Pry. School, Agiere I; Ovuegbe Pry. School, Agiere II; Weppa Market Square, Ovao/Otoakwi; Ari, Primary School, Iviari; Ugioke Primary School, Owai/Uguioke; Ovoegbe Pry. School, Itsukwi; Osholo Primary School Osholo
Etsako East	Okpella I	Ikpomaza Grammar School, Okpella; Afegbua Pry. School, Imietemegie/Itekume/Imiadatse; Utayokhe Pry. School, Imiosumu/Imogia; Court Hall, Imiakhana/Imianoko; Imiagbese Pry. School Imiagbese I; Imiagbese Pry. School Imiagbese II; Public Square, Imiadatse-Orere; Afegbua Pry. School, Awuyemi - I; Afegbua Pry. School, Awuyemi - II
Etsako East	Okpella II	Ugbedogun Pry. School, Ogute; Ugbedogun Pry. School, Udiegwa; Ekuri Pry. School, Ighiatse/Imhirhokho/Imanaba I; Ekuri Pry. School, Ighiatse/Imhirhokho/Imanaba II; Ilewuri Public Square, Ilewuri; Ofuokha Pry. School, Okhu/Ofuokha; Ofuokha Pry. School, Iturogbe; Ugbedogun Pry. School, Okokpetu; Udiogiegie Pry. School, Imienegwe
Etsako East	Okpella III	Local Govt. Maternity, Imiomime/Idane/Oke I; Local Govt. Maternity, Imiomime/Idane/Oke II; Eramhe Pry School, Imioko/Utegie; Ogodor Pry. School, Ogiriga; Eramhe Pry. School, Mieteke/Yeluwa; Eramhe Pry. School, Imiomoka; Rhinocem, Factory Camp; Eramhe Pry. School, Kalabar
Etsako East	Okpella IV	Iddo I Pry. School, Iddo Old Site; Iddo Pry. Schol, Sabo; Imioko Qrts/Shade, Imioshoga I; Imioko Qrts/Shade, Imioshoga II; Imiokpe Qrts/Shade, Imiokpe; Eveva Pry. Schol, Okugbe I; Eveva Pry. School, Imiekuri; Eveva Pry. School, Okugbe II; Ogugu Camp Open Space, Ogugu
Etsako East	Three Ibies	Egwakhide Pry. School, Igodor/Odokiode; Echadakwi Pry. School, Ikioge/Egabhe I; Echadakwi Pry. School, Ikioge/Egabhe II; Echadakwi Pry. School, Sabo/Ogodor; Former L. E. A. School, Ujiogwa/Ukhomogwa; Imiegba Gram. School, Aborkpa Mkt. Squae; Azamandu Pry. School, Imiekebu; Afekha Pry. School, Itsukwi; Azamandu Pry. School, I Annex, Okpa/Idegbesua
Etsako East	Okpekpe	Otsele Pry. School, Odishemi/Okugi/Ufodobo; Otsele Pry. School, Okiode/Ivioke/New Site; Ogwokha, Okwokha-Okpekpe; Amuge Annex, Amuge-Ebelle; Oduba Pry. School, Ebelle Town; Edokha Pry. School, Ukhomedokha; Ikpelli Pry. School, Ikpelli - Ebelle; Open Space, Okeko/Achitanya/Ujuokpasa
Etsako West	Auchi	Afenokhua/Otaru Palace - Open Space; Abu/Igbafe - Near Ugiedane Mosque; Yeluwa - Booth; Momoh St. Egelegor - Osugun P/S; Idalu St Opposite T. F. - Usogun Primary School; Kadiri Area - Open Space; Iyogaga Qrts - Booth; Central Mosque/Ughele Mkt. Area - Booth Inughele Mkt.; Okoto-Iyetse- Okoto-Iyetse Booth; Idane-Iyetse- Idane-Iyetse Booth
Etsako West	Auchi I	Audu Close - Uchi P/S, Auchi; Afesokhai Qrts -Uchi P/S; Hausa Qrts - Uchi P/S; Afekpologhodo - Momoh P/S; Egbeadokhai/Momoh Street- Momoh Primary School; Otaru P/S Area - Otaru P/S; Gra/Spe. Hospital Area - Council Hall
Etsako West	Auchi II	Afamanesi-Ekhei P/S; Afosigwe - Ekhei P/S; Afigiebor/ Afeoluogba-Ekhei P/S; Fed. Poly Golan Height - Fed Poly. Hostel G I; Fed. Poly Golan Height - Fed Poly. Hostel G II; Afeasure/Igbe- Aibotse/Igbe P/S I; Afeogiri-Igbe/ Aibotse/Igbe P/S II
Etsako West	Auchi III	Udianegbe - Old Post Office; Okoto Uguyi And Idane Uguyi - Olele St. Booth; I. C.. E Road Area - I. C. E.; Iyofa/Okpokwili - Near Iyofa Mosque; Afobome - Afobome Booth; Our Lady Of Fatima Areas - Our Lady Of Fatima College; Afeagbokhaikhume. Aibotse - Aibotse/ Igbe P/S; Afeagbokhaikhume - Aibotse P/S; Sch. Of Eme Igbira Camp - Igbira Camp Booth; Nicoho Barracks - Maimi Mkt. Booth
Etsako West	South Ibie	Sabo-Iyakpi-Ekhaibhele Pry. / Sch. I; Sabo-Iyakpi-Ekhaibhele Pry. / Sch. II; Afogbe- Iyakpi - Oshiozekhai P/S; Anwuowele Iyakpi-Osiozekhai P/S; Afomhe Iyesimu- Oshiozekhai Primary School; Odiebie/Egbai - Oshiozekhai Pry. / Sch.; Afokhokho Afokhai- Near Aidonogie Palace (Booth); Afome Iyakpakwe - Ibienafe Town Hall; Abhome/Ukpologie Ibie - Igebo P/S; Ugieda - Ugieda P/S; Iyerekhu - Iyerekhu Pry. / Sch. I; Iyerekhu - Iyerekhu Pry. /Sch. II; Egbogio - Ikiroda P/S; Ugiekhai - Ikiroda P/S
Etsako West	Jagbe	Ihilame- Adult Sch. Hall Upper Ihilame I; Ihilame- Adult Sch. Hall Upper Ihilame II; Ihilame - Enialigie P/S; Ikhua - Ebesemobo P/S; Eko-Ebogiele- Dispensary Maternity; Imiokono - Agben P/S; Imiogia - Agben P/S
Etsako West	Aviele	Ekiode Momudu Col. Area - Momodu College; Agaga Qtrs - Omoaka P/S; Habeeb Camp Iyezama - Atebheda P/S; Osomegbe Okwale - Atebheda P/S; Dododawa Areas - Booth Near Palace Market.; Afazoba/Abumere/Iyekhuazu - Azemokai P/S; Yoruba/Iyelekpigie/Iyioko - Azemokhai P/S; Odigie - Iyekere Junction; Egho Old Site -Booth; Egho New Site Egho P/S; Oguola - Booth At Oguola; Egono - Egono P/S; Okoto-Ughioli - Ughioli P/S I; Okoto-Ughioli - Ughioli P/S II; Idane Ugholi - Ughioli P/S; Adetse Eko Ubiane - Esivue P/S; Afanokpi Ubiane - Esivue P/S
Etsako West	Anwain	Idegun / Ukpeko - Amah - Unity P/S Idegun; Idegun/Ukepko - Amah - Unity P/S Idegun; Ovughu/Alimogiza - Ogiemudu P/S, Ewora; Otteh/Ighira - Ogiemudu P/S, Ewora; Ibhioba - Ibhioba Primary School, Ibhioba; Imiefom/Umhen - Iyoke P/S, Eware; Imiamobor/Imiaida/Uyaki - Iyoke P/S, Eware; Amah/Igbo/Oriafo - Ighuku P/S, Amah I; Amah/Igbo/Oriafo - Ighuku P/S, Amah II
Etsako West	Uzairue North West	Ugbenor / Iyuku-Uku P/S, Iyuku (Jnr); Okpokwili- Olele - Booth; Iyakhala I - Uku P/S (Snr.); Iyakhala II - Adult Edu Hall; Olele - Open Space (Maternity); Imeke - Imeke P/S; Iyotse - Imeke P/S; Imeke/Iyotse - Imeke P/S; Elele I - Inigbi P/S; Elele II - Inigbi P/S; Elele III - Inigbi P/S; Agheda/Ayua -Izuagie P/S; Iyagbughie - Izuagie P/S
Etsako West	Uzairue North East	Iyamoh - Iyamoh P/S; Ogbido/Ikholo - Osagbe P/S; Uluoke/Ayaoghena - Ogio P/S; Afowa I - Afowa Town Hall; Afowa II - Town Hall; Afowa III - Afowa P/S; Okhufovo Iyorah - Iyorah P/S; Iyazinogbo Iyolo/Iyorere - Iyorah P/S; Ayoghena Old Site - Booth; Akpakobo Iyaomo - Market Hall; Akpenamho Iviosi - Sule P/S; Oghomere - Apana M. S. S.; Iyofa - Sule P/S; Akpasavameh - Near Ang. Church; Akpasavamah - Booth Near Anglican Church; Akpokobo Iviomoh - (Booth) Market Store
Etsako West	Uzairue South West	Palace Area- Oyagha P/S; Okotoelo Ayegha - Oyagha P/S; Iyegbefue - Oyagha P/S; Omogbae, Tv Road, Yeluwa - Azama P/S Yeluwa; Usokwi Iyogbe - Azama Primary School; Okoto Ukwe - Omogbai P/S I; Omoto Ogbe - Omogbai P/S II; Okoto Iyogbe - Omogbai P/S Iyuku Road; Iyuku Road/Yeluwa Exp - Market Board; Iyeremhe - Court Hall; Ughie Elele - Olukhu P/S; Oghemese Area - Open Space; Venus Qrts I - Omodagbe Frontage; Venus Qrts II - Idawekhai Frontage; Yeluwa Village - Booth Near Yeluwa Mosque; Iyate - Iyate Hall
Etsako West	Uzairue South East	Ivinone - Afashio P/S; Omoazakpe - Afashio Town Hall; Iyoku - Utukwe Afashio Booth; Ighogho - Booth At Ighogho; Idato - Booth At Idato; Ikabigbo I - Ikabigbo P/S; Ikabigbo II - Ikabigbo P/S; Ugbenor - Ugbenor P/S; Irekpai - Odene P/S, Irekpai; Afeugueze - Okpodu P/S; Afeugueze Ayogwiri - Postal Agency; Onota/Iyagbo - Okpodu P/S; Ugiogwa - Town Hall (Ayogwiri); Afe - Igbafe/ Apizeye - Odene P/S, Ayogwiri
Igueben	Ekekhen/Idumuogo/Egbiki	Ekekhen - Ekekhen P/S I; Ekekhen - Ekekhen P/S II; Egbiki Primary School, Egbiki; Idumuogo - Idumuogo Primary School
Igueben	Idigun/ Idumedo	Igueben-Idigun, Eguare P/S I; Igueben-Idigun, Eguare P/S II; Igueben- Idumedo, Eguare P/S
Igueben	Afuda/Idumuoka	Igueben - Afuda P/S/ I; Igueben - Afuda P/S/ II; Igueben - Afuda P/S/ III; Igueben - Idumuoka P/S/
Igueben	Uhe/Idumuogbo/Idumueke	Igueben-Uhe, Utantan P/S; Igueben-Idumuogbo, Utantan P/S; Igueben, Idumueke, Utantan P/S
Igueben	Udo	Udo, Eguare P/S; Udo Eguare P/S; Udo, Udo Gram. School; Udo - Udoneria, Udoneria P/S
Igueben	Owu/ Okuta/ Eguare Ebelle	Ebelle, Idumu-Owu P/S I; Ebelle, Idumu-Owu P/S II; Ebelle, Idumu-Owu P/S III; Ebelle, Idumu-Owu P/S IV; Okuta, Okuta P/S I; Okuta, Okuta P/S II; Ologhe, Ologhe P/S; Eguare - Ebelle, Eguare P/S
Igueben	Okalo/ Okpujie	Okalo, Okalo P/S I; Okalo, Okalo P/S II; Okpujie, Okpujie P/S I; Okpujie, Okpujie P/S II
Igueben	Amahor/Ugun	Amahor, Eguare P/S I; Amahor, Eguare P/S II; Obodeko, Obodeko P/S; Ugun, Eguare P/S; Ugun, Ugun Sec. School
Igueben	Ewossa	Ewossa, Eguare P/S; Ewossa, Ujielu P/S; Ewossa, Idinegbon P/S
Igueben	Ekpon	Ekpon, Old L. A. School I; Ekpon, Old L. A. School II; Ekpon, Old L. A. School III; Ekpon, Eko Pry. School; Ekpon, Central Primary School; Ekpon, Ijeduma P/S; Ekpon, Ikpudu Comm. Hall
Ikpoba/Okha	Iwogban/Uteh	Ikpoba - Army Children School I; Ikpoba - Army Children School II; Ikpoba - Army Children School III; Ikpoba - Army Children School IV; Ikpoba - Army Children School V; Ikpoba - Army Children School VI; Ikpoba - Army Children School VII; Ikpoba - Army Children School VIII; Ikpoba - Army Children School IX; Ikpoba - Army Children School X; Ikpoba - Army Children School XI; Palace Road, Uteh (Army Children Pry Sch XII); Open Space Near Inec Office (Sch. For Mentally Retarded I); Open Space Near Inec Office (Sch. For Mentally Retarded II); Open Space Near Inec Office (Sch. For Physically Handicap I); Open Space Near Inec Office (Sch. For Physically Handicap II); Ikpoba - Open Space Before C. P. I; Ikpoba - Open Space Before C. P. II; Ikpoba - Pat Pry/ Nur . School I; Ikpoba - Pat Pry/ Nur . School II; Ikpoba - Iwogban Hall I; Ikpoba - Iwogban Hall II; Ikpoba - Tebogan Hall I; Ikpoba - Tebogan Hall II; Uteh, Uteh Sec. School; Uteh, Omoregie Hall; Ekiuwa - Ekiuwa Town Hall I; Ekiuwa - Ekiuwa Town Hall II; Ekiuwa - Edoh Primary School
Ikpoba/Okha	Oregbeni	Ogiso - Shaka Polytechnic I; Ogiso - Shaka Polytechnic II; Ogiso - Shaka Polytechnic III; Ogiso - Shaka Polytechnic IV; Edokpolor Fac - Oloh Motors I; Edokpolor Fac - Oloh Motors II; Oregbeni Quarters - Ogbeni Pry. School I; Oregbeni Quarters - Ogbeni Pry. School II; Oregbeni Quarters - Ogbeni Pry. School III; Oregbeni Market - Ogbeni Primary School I; Oregbeni Market - Ogbeni Primary School II; Oregbeni Market - Ogbeni Primary School III; Oregbeni Market - Ogbeni Primary School IV; Oregbeni Market - Ogbeni Primary School V; Oregbeni - Western Boys High School I; Oregbeni - Western Boys High School II; Oregbeni - Western Boys High School III; Oregbeni - Western Boys High School IV; Oregbeni - Western Boys High School V; Oregbeni - Western Boys High School VI; Oregbeni - Western Boys High School VII; Oregbeni - Western Boys High School VIII; Oregbeni - Western Boys High School IX; Oregbeni - Western Boys High School X; Ramat Park - Ramart Park I; Ramat Park - Ramart Park II; Oregbeni - Oregbeni Nur./Primary School I; Oregbeni - Oregbeni Nur./Primary School II; Oregbeni - Oregbeni Nur./Primary School III; Oregbeni - Oregbeni Nur./Primary School IV; Oregbeni - Oregbeni Nur./Primary School V; Oregbeni - Oregbeni Nur./Primary School VI; Edokpolor - Oloh Motors
Ikpoba/Okha	Ogbeson	Ogbenson - Queen Ede School I; Ogbenson - Queen Ede School II; Ogbenson - Queen Ede School III; Ogbenson - Queen Ede School IV; Ogbenson - Queen Ede School V; Ogbenson - Queen Ede School VI; Ogbeson - Ogbeson Town Hall I; Ogbeson - Ogbeson Town Hall II; Ogbeson Ogbeson Health Centre; Ogbeson - Eresoyen Primary School I; Ogbeson - Eresoyen Primary School II; Ogbeson - Eresoyen Primary School III; Ogbeson - Eresoyen Primary School IV; Ohovbe - Ohovbe Town Hall I; Ohovbe - Ohovbe Town Hall II; Ohovbe - Ohovbe Town Hall III; Ohovbe - Ohovbe Town Hall IV; Ohovbe, Ohovbe Town Hall V; Ohovbe, Ohovbe Town Hall VI; Ohovbe, Ohovbe Town Hall VII; Amufi Pry Sch. Amufi (Ohovbe Town Hall VIII)
Ikpoba/Okha	Aduwawa / Evbo Modu	Aduwawa - Aduwawa Sec. School I; Aduwawa - Aduwawa Sec. School II; Aduwawa - Aduwawa Sec. School III; Aduwawa - Aduwawa Sec. School IV; Aduwawa - Aduwawa Sec. School V; Aduwawa, Aduwawa Sec. School VI; Aduwawa, Near Big Joe Motors I; Aduwawa, Near Big Joe Motors II; Aduwawa, Near Big Joe Motors III; Aduwawa, Near Big Joe Motors IV; Aduwawa, Near Big Joe Motors V; Aduwawa, Near Big Joe Motors VI; Urora - Akengbuda Primary School VII; Urora - Akengbuda Primary School VIII; Urora - Akengbuda Primary School IX; Urora - Akengbuda Primary School X; Evbuomodu - Evbuomodu Town Hall I; Evbuomodu - Evbuomodu Town Hall II; Evruomodu - Evbuomodu Health Cntre I; Evruomodu - Evbuomodu Health Cntre II; Aduwawa - Market Area
Ikpoba/Okha	St. Saviour	St. Saviour - Ivbiyeneva Primary School I; St. Saviour - Ivbiyeneva Primary School II; St. Saviour - Ivbiyeneva Primary School III; St. Saviour - Ivbiyeneva Primary School IV; St. Saviour - Ivbiyeneva Primary School V; St. Saviour - Ivbiyeneva Primary School VI; St. Saviour - Ivbiyeneva Primary School VII; St. Saviour - Ivbiyeneva Primary School VIII; St. Saviour - Ivbiyeneva Primary School IX; St. Saviour - Ivbiyeneva Primary School X; St. Saviour - Ivbiyeneva Primary School XI; St. Saviour - Ivbiyeneva Primary School XII; St. Saviour - Ivbiyeneva Primary School XIII; St. Saviour - Ivbiyeneva Primary School XIV; St. Saviour - Ivbiyeneva Primary School XV; St. Saviour - Ivbiyeneva Primary School XVI; St. Saviour - Ivbiyeneva Primary School XVII; St. Saviour - Ivbiyeneva Primary School XVIII; St. Saviour - Ivbiyeneva Primary School XIX; St. Saviour - Ivbiyeneva Primary School XX; Avbiana - Ogiana Primary School I; Avbiana - Ogiana Primary School II; St. Saviour - Umelu Sec. School I; St. Saviour - Umelu Sec. School II; St. Saviour - Umelu Primary School I; St. Saviour - Umelu Primary School II; St. Saviour - Umelu Primary School III; St. Saviour - Oguola College I; St. Saviour - Oguola College II; St. Saviour - Oguola College III; St. Saviour - Oguola College IV; St. Saviour - Oguola College V; St. Saviour - Oguola College VI; St. Saviour - Oguola College VII; St. Saviour - Oguola College VIII; St. Saviour - Oguola College IX; St. Saviour - Oguola College X; St. Saviour - Oguola College XI; St. Saviour - Oguola College XII
Ikpoba/Okha	Gorretti	Gorretti - Niger Colleg E I; Gorretti - Niger Colleg E II; Gorretti - Niger Colleg E III; Gorretti - Niger Colleg E IV; Gorretti - Niger Colleg E V; Gorretti - Niger Colleg E VI; Gorretti - Niger Colleg E VII; Gorretti - Niger Colleg E VIII; Gorretti - Niger Colleg E IX; Gorretti - Niger Colleg E X; Gorretti - Etete Primary School I; Gorretti - Etete Primary School II; Gorretti - Maria Gorretti College I; Gorretti - Maria Gorretti College II; Gorretti - Maria Gorretti College III; Gorretti - Maria Gorretti College IV; Gorretti - Maria Gorretti College V; Gorretti - Maria Gorretti College VI; Gorretti - Sch. Of Health Technology I; Gorretti - Sch. Of Health Technology II; Gorretti - Sch. Of Health Technology III; Gorretti - Sch. Of Health Technology IV; Gorretti - Sch. Of Health Technology V; Gorretti - Sch. Of Health Technology VI; Gorretti - Ivbiotor Primary School I; Gorretti - Ivbiotor Primary School II; Gorretti - Ivbiotor Primary School III; Gorretti - Ivbiotor Primary School IV; Gorretti - Ivbiotor Primary School V; Gorretti - Ivbiotor Primary School VI; Gorretti - Ivbiotor Primary School VII; Gorretti - Ivbiotor Primary School VIII; Gorretti - Itohan Girls G/School I; Gorretti - Itohan Girls G/School II; Gorretti - Itohan Girls G/School III; Gorretti - Itohan Girls G/School IV; Gorretti - Itohan Girls G/School V; Gorretti - Itohan Girls G/School VI; Gorretti - Manpower Dev. Centre I; Gorretti - Manpower Dev. Centre II; Gorretti - Manpower Dev. Centre III; Gorretti - Manpower Dev. Centre IV; Gorretti - Manpower Dev. Centre V; Goretti - Ogiomo Sec. School I; Goretti - Ogiomo Sec. School II; Goretti - Ogiomo Sec. School III; Goretti - Ogiomo Sec. School IV; Etete M. P. D. - Etete P/S I; Etete M. P. D. - Etete P/S II; Etete M. P. D. - Manpower Dev. I; Etete M. P. D. - Manpower Dev. II; Etete M. P. D. - Etete Primary School
Ikpoba/Okha	Ugbekun	Enikaro - Enikaro Primary School I; Enikaro - Enikaro Primary School II; Enikaro - Enikaro Primary School III; Enikaro - Enikaro Primary School IV; Enikaro - Enikaro Primary School V; Enikaro - Enikaro Primary School VI; Enikaro - Enikaro Primary School VII; Enikaro - Enikaro Primary School VIII; Enikaro - Enikaro Primary School IX; Enikaro - Enikaro Primary School X; Enikaro, Ugbekun Health Centre I; Enikaro, Ugbekun Health Centre II; Enikaro, Ugbekun Health Centre III; Enikaro, Ugbekun Health Centre IV; Enikaro, Ugbekun Health Centre V; Enikaro - Ugbekun Primary School I; Enikaro - Ugbekun Primary School II; Ugbekun - Ologbosere Primary School I; Ugbekun - Ologbosere Primary School II; Ugbekun - Ologbosere Primary School III; Ugbekun - Ologbosere Primary School IV; Ugbekun - Ologbosere Primary School V; Ugbekun - Ologbosere Primary School VI; Ugbekun - Ologbosere Primary School VII; Ugbekun - Ologbosere Primary School VIII; Ugbekun - Ologbosere Primary School IX; Ugbekun - Ologbosere Primary School X; Ugbekun - Ologbosere Primary School XI; Ugbekun - Ologbosere Primary School XII; Ugbekun - Ologbosere Primary School XIII; Ugbekun - Ologbosere Primary School XIV; Ugbekun - Ologbosere Primary School XV; Ugbekun - Ologbosere Primary School XVI; Ugbekun - Ologbosere Primary School XVII; Ugbekun - Ologbosere Primary School XVIII; Ugbekun - Ologbosere Primary School XIX; Ugbekun - Ologbosere Primary School XX; Ologbosere Pry Sch (Ugbekun Town Hall I); Ologbosere Pry Sch (Ugbekun Town Hall II)
Ikpoba/Okha	Idogbo	Idogbo, Idogbo - Akugbe Primary School I; Idogbo, Idogbo - Akugbe Primary School II; Idogbo, Idogbo - Akugbe Primary School III; Idogbo, Idogbo - Ozolua Primary School; Idogbo, Idogbo - Adolor Primary School I; Idogbo, Idogbo - Adolor Primary School II; Idogbo, Idogbo - Aoro Primary School I; Idogbo, Idogbo - Aoro Primary School II; Idogbo, Idogbo - Space Near Abico Market I; Idogbo, Idogbo - Space Near Abico Market II; Idogbo, Idogbo - Space Near Abico Market III; Avbiakagba Town Hall (Space Near Market IV); Idogbo, Idogbo - Space Near Abico Market IV; Idogbo, Idogbo - Space Near Abico Market V; Idogbo, Idogbo - Near Ndla Office I; Idogbo, Idogbo - Near Ndla Office II; Idogbo, Idogbo - Near Ndla Office III; Idogbo, Idogbo - Near Ndla Office IV; Idogbo, Idogbo - Near Ndla Office V; Idogbo, Idogbo - Near Ndla Office VI; Oka Secondary Sch, Oka 3 (Near Ndlea Office VII); Oka Secondary Sch, Oka 4 (Near Ndlea Office VIII); Idogbo, Idogbo - Idogbo Sec. School IX; Idogbo, Idogbo - Idogbo Sec. School X; Idogbo, Idogbo - Women Special Centre I; Idogbo, Idogbo - Women Special Centre II; Idogbo, Idogbo - Obazegbon Primary School; Idogbo - Ogubor Primary School; Idogbo - Health Centre; Ikpe - Elaisubi Primary School; Obagienokporo - Osenwede Primary School I; Obagienokporo - Osenwede Primary School II; Idogbo - Osenwede Primary School I; Idogbo - Osenwede Primary School II; Ulegun - Ulegun Primary School; Utesi - Utesi Town Hall; Oka - Market Space; Uyinwendin - Uyinwendin Town Hall I; Uyinwendin - Uyinwendin Town Hall II; Oka I Nomayo - Good Foundation Sec. School; Presco Camps - Presco Hall; Uyinmwendin - Uyinmwendin
Ikpoba/Okha	Obayantor	Obayantor - Aighemusa Primary School I; Evboabogun Town Hall (Aighemusa Pry Sch. II); Obayantor - Iyenoroho Primary Sch. I; Obayantor - Iyenoroho Primary Sch. II; Obayantor - Ogheghe Town Hall; Obayantor - Osemwende Primary School I; Obayantor - Osemwende Primary School II; Obayantor - Health Centre; Obayantor - Obiagienevbuosa T. Hall I; Obayantor - Obiagienevbuosa T. Hall II; Obayantor - Obiagienevbuosa Health Hall; Obayantor - Edo Primary School I; Obayantor - Edo Primary School II; Obayantor - Edo Primary School III; Obayantor, Obasunyi College; Obayantor - Ewuare Primary School I; Obayantor - Ewuare Primary School II; Obayantor - Ewuare Primary School III; Obayantor Iyi - Ewuare Primary School I; Obayantor Iyi - Ewuare Primary School II; Obayantor - Robber R. Institute Primary Sch. I; Obayantor - Robber R. Institute Primary Sch. II; Obayantor - Otomwen Primary School; Obayantor - Odigie Primary School I; Obayantor - Odigie Primary School II; Obayantor - Odigie Primary School III; Obayantor - Ogbekpen Town Hall
Ikpoba/Okha	Ologbo	Ologbo, Ologbo Health Centre; Ologbo, Ohon Primary School I; Ologbo, Ohon Primary School II; Ologbo, Ohon Primary School III; Ologbo, Ohon Primary School IV; Ologbo, Ohon Primary School V; Ologbo, Imasabor Town Hall; Open Space, Near Aunty Maria Sch. (Obayantor Ozolua Pry Sch); Ologbo, Ozolua Gramm. School I; Ologbo, Ozolua Gramm. School II; Ologbo, Ologbo Town Hall I; Ologbo, Ologbo Town Hall II; Ologbo, Ologbo Town Hall III; Ologbo, Ologbo Primary School I; Ologbo, Ologbo Primary School II; Ologbo, Ajatiton Hall; Ologbo, Buwa Primary School I; Ologbo, Buwa Primary School II; Ologbo, Buwa Primary School III; Ologbo, Ajamimogha T. Hall I; Ologbo, Ajamimogha T. Hall II; Ologbo, Kolokolo T. Hall; Ologbo, Ikara Hall; Ologbo, Ugbokporo T. Hall; Ologbo, Idaba Square; Ologbo, Buwa Primary School; Ologbo, Ajamimogha T. Hall; Abiala - Oketia P/S Abiala I; Abiala - Oketia P/S Abiala II; Ajamimogha - Market Square
Oredo	Ogbe	Ogbe I, Urhokpota Hall I; Ogbe I, Urhokpota Hall II; Ogbe I, Oredo Lga Car Park I; Ogbe I, Oredo Lga Car Park II; Ogbe II, Ogbe Primary School; Ogbe II, Obaseki Primary School; Ogbe III, Ezoti Primary School I; Ogbe III, Ezoti Primary School II; Ogbe III, St Paul'S Primary School; Ogbe IV, High Court Premises; Ogbe IV, Oba Akenzua II Cultural Hall; Ogbe IV - Idah Primary School I; Ogbe IV - Idah Primary School II; Ogbe IV Idah Primary School III; Ogbe IV Idah Primary School IV; Ogbe IV Idah Primary School V; Ogbe IV Idah Primary School VI; Uzebu I Garrick Mem. Comp. Primary School I; Uzebu I, Garrick Mem. Comp. Primary School II; Uzebu I, Garrick Mem. Comp. Primary School III; Uzebu I, Garrick Mem. Comp. Primary School IV; Uzebu II, Ogbe - Ibuya Primary School I; Uzebu II, Ogbe - Ibuya Primary School II; Uzebu II, Ogbe - Ibuya Primary School III; Uzebu II, Trade Fair Complex Premises IV; Uzebu II, Trade Fair Complex Premises V; Isekhere I, Uyiosa Pry. Sch. I; Isekhere I, Uyiosa Pry Sch. II; Isekhere I, Uyiosa Pry Sch. III; Isekhere I, Uyiosa Pry Sch. IV
Oredo	Gra/Etete	Gra I, Staff Training Centre I; Gra I, Staff Training Centre II; Gra II, Oredo Model Primary School I; Gra II, Oredo Model Primary. School II; Gra II, Oredo Model Pry. School; Gra III, Ebenezer Primary School I; Gra III, Ebenezer Primary School II; Etete I, Nnpc Etete I; Etete II, Nnpc Etete II; Ekae/Ugbor, Ekae Primary School; Ekae/Ugbor, Ivbiore Pry. School; Elema I, Anglican G/G School I; Elema I, Anglican G/G School II; Elema I, Anglican G/G School III; Elema II, Greater Tomorrow Sec. School I; Elema II, Greater Tomorrow Sec. School II; Elema II, Greater Tomorrow Sec. School III; Ogba I, Airforce Primary School I; Ogba I, Airforce Primary School II; Ogba I, Oba Ewuare College; Ogba I, Ekhaguere Primary School; Ogba I, Ighiwiyisi Primary School; Ogba II, Akenzua Primary School; Odia II, Odia Primary School; Odia II, Eweka Primary School; Odia II, Umegbe Primary School; Ogba III, Okunbor Primary School; Ogba III, Ebo Primary School; Ogba III, Ogiso Primary School; Ogba III, Obaizamomwan Primary School; Ogba III, Ovbo Primary School; Ogba III, I Ugogogin Primary School; Ogba IV Akpae Primary School; Ogba IV, Evbuoruhun Primary School; Ogba IV, Uroma Primary School; Ogba IV, Irhuenowina Primary School
Oredo	Uzebu	Uzebu I, Owegie Primary School I; Uzebu I, Owegie Primary School II; Uzebu I, Owegie Primary School III; Uzebu I Owegie Primary School IV; Uzebu, I Owegie Primary School V; Uzebu II, Owina Primary School I; Uzebu II, Owina Primary School II; Uzebu III, Ezomo Primary School I -I; Uzebu III, Ezomo Primary School I - II; Uzebu III, Ezomo Primary School I-III; Uzebu IV, Ezomo Primary School II-I; Uzebu IV, Ezomo Primary School II-II; Uzebu IV, Ezomo Primary School II-III; Uzebu IV, Ezomo Primary School II-IV; Uzebu IV, Ezomo Primary School II- V; Uzebu V, Owina Primary School I; Uzebu V, Owina Primary School II; Uzebu V, Owina Primary School III; Uzebu V, Owina Primary School IV; Oliha I, Oba Akenzua Primary School I; Oliha I, Oba Akenzua Primary School II; Oliha I, Oba Akenzua Primary School III; Oliha I, Oba Akenzua Primary School IV; Oliha I, Oba Akenzua Primary School V; Oliha I, Oba Akenzua Primary School VI; Oliha II, Ewuare Primary School I; Oliha II, Ewuare Primary School II; Oliha II, Ewuare Primary School III; Oliha II, Ewuare Primary School IV; Oliha II, Ewuare Primary School V
Oredo	Urubi/Evbiemwen/Iwehen	Urubi Evbiemwen, Emotan College I; Urubi Evbiemwen, Emotan College II; Urubi Evbiemwen, Emotan College III; Urubi Evbiemwen, Emotan College IV; Urubi Evbiemwen, Emotan College V; Urubi Evbiemwen, Idia College I; Urubi Evbiemwen, Idia College II; Urubi Evbiemwen, Idia College III; Urubi Evbiemwen, Idia College IV; Urubi Evbiemwen, Idia College V; Urubi Evbiemwen, Idia College VI; Iwehen/Iguisi, Fabiyi Akpata Pry. School I; Iwehen/Iguisi, Fabiyi Akpata Pry. School II; Iwehen/Iguisi, Fabiyi Akpata Pry. School III; Iwehen/Iguisi, Fabiyi Akpata Pry. School IV; Iwehen/Iguisi, Fabiyi Akpata Pry. School V; Iwehen/Iguisi, Fabiyi Akpata Pry. School VI; Iwehen/Iguisi, Fabiyi Akpata Pry. School VII; Okemole I, Emokpae Primary School I; Okemole I, Emokpae Primary School II; Okemole I, Emokpae Primary School III; Okemole I, Emokpae Primary School IV; Okemole I, Emokpae Primary School V; Okemole I, Emokpae Primary School VI; Okemole I, Emokpae Primary School VII; Okemole I, Emokpae Primary School VIII; Okemole I, Emokpae Primary School IX; Okemole I, Emokpae Primary School X
Oredo	Ihogbe/ Isekhere/ Oreoghene/ Ibiwe/ Ice Road	Ihogbe I - Inst. Of Cont. Education I; Ihogbe I - Inst. Of Cont. Education II; Ihogbe I - Inst. Of Cont. Education III; Ihogbe I - Akenzua II Sec. School I; Ihogbe I, - Akenzua II Sec. School II; Ihogbe I, Ihogbe College I; Ihogbe I, Ihogbe College II; Ihogbe I, Ihogbe College III; Ihogbe II, Ivbiore Primary School I; Ihogbe II, Ivbiore Primary School II; Ihogbe II, Ivbiore Primary School III; Ihogbe II, Ivbiore Primary School IV; Ihogbe II, Ivbiore Primary School V; Ihogbe II, Iyoba Primary School I; Ihogbe II, Iyoba Primary School II; Ihogbe II, Iyoba Primary School III; Ihogbe II, School For The Blind; Ore-Oghene I, Ore-Oghene Primary School I; Ore-Oghene I, Ore-Oghene Primary School II; Ore-Oghene I, Ore-Oghene Primary School III; Ore-Oghene I, Ore-Oghene Primary School IV; Ore-Oghene I, Baptist High School I; Ore-Oghene I, Baptist High School II; Ore-Oghene I, Baptist High School III; Oliha I, Oliha Primary School I; Oliha I, Oliha Primary School II; Oliha I, Oliha Primary School III; Oliha I, Oliha Primary School IV; Oliha I, Oliha Primary School V; Oliha I, Oliha Primary School VI
Oredo	New Benin I	New Benin I, Min. Of Education Iyaro I; New Benin I, Min. Of Education Iyaro II; New Benin I, Min. Of Education Iyaro III; New Benin I, Min. Of Education Iyaro IV; New Benin I, Min. Of Education Iyaro V; New Benin I, Min. Of Education Iyaro VI; New Benin I, Min. Of Education Iyaro VII; New Benin I, Min. Of Education Iyaro VIII; New Benin I, Min. Of Education Iyaro IX; New Benin I, Min. Of Education Iyaro X; New Benin I, Min. Of Education Iyaro XI; New Benin II, Min. Of Education, Iyaro XII; New Benin II, Min. Of Education, Iyaro XIII; New Benin II, Min. Of Education, Iyaro XIV; New Benin II, Min. Of Education, Iyaro XV; New Benin II, Min. Of Education, Iyaro XVI; New Benin II Min. Of Education, Iyaro XVII; New Benin II, Min. Of Education, Iyaro XVIII; New Benin II, Min. Of Education, Iyaro XIX; New Benin II, Min. Of Education, Iyaro XX; New Benin III, Min. Of Education, Iyaro XXI; New Benin III, Min. Of Education, Iyaro XXII; New Benin III, Min. Of Education, Iyaro XXIII; New Benin III, Min. Of Education, Iyaro XXIV; New Benin III, Min. Of Education, Iyaro XXV; New Benin III, Min. Of Education, Iyaro XXVI; New Benin III, Min. Of Education, Iyaro XXVII; New Benin II, Min. Of Education, Iyaro XXVIII
Oredo	New Benin II	Eben/New Benin I, Adesuwa Primary School I; Eben/New Benin I, Adesuwa Primary School II; Eben/New Benin I, Adesuwa Primary School III; Eben/New Benin I, Adesuwa Primary School IV; Eben/New Benin I, Adesuwa Primary School V; Eben/New Benin II, Esigie Primary School I; Eben/New Benin II, Esigie Primary School II; Eben/New Benin II, Esigie Primary School III; Eben/New Benin III, Oguola Primary School I; Eben/New Benin III, Oguola Primary School II; Eben/New Benin III, Oguola Primary School III; Eben/New Benin III, Oguola Primary School IV; Eben New/Benin IV, New Era College I; Eben New/Benin IV, New Era College II; Eben/New Benin IV, Victory Primary School I; Eben/New Benin IV, Victory Primary School II; Eben/New Benin IV, Victory Primary School III; Eben/New Benin IV, Victory Primary School IV; New Benin I, Edokpolor Gramm. School I; New Benin I, Edokpolor Gramm. School II; New Benin II, Community Primary School I; New Benin II, Community Primary School II; New Benin II, Community Primary School III; New Benin III, Payne Primary School I; New Benin III, Payne Primary School II; New Benin III, Payne Primary School III; New Benin III, Payne Primary School IV; Ikpoba I - Usi Primary School I; Ikpoba I - Usi Primary School II; Ikpoba I - Usi Primary School III
Oredo	Oredo	Okedo I, Izevbigie Primary School I; Okedo I, Izevbigie Primary School II; Okedo I, Izevbigie Primary School III; Okedo I, Izevbigie Primary School IV; Okedo I, Izevbigie Primary School V; Okedo I, Izevbigie Primary School VI; Okedo II, Ogboe Primary School I; Okedo II, Ogboe Primary School II; Okedo II, Ogboe Primary School III; Okedo II, Ogboe Primary School IV; Okedo II, Ogboe Primary School V; Okedo III, Virginia Primary School I; Okedo III, Virginia Primary School II; Okedo III, Virginia Primary School III; Okedo III, Virginia Primary School IV; Okedo II, Virginia Primary School V; Okedo III, Virginia Primary School VI; Okedo III, Virginia Primary School VII; Okedo IV, Eyaenugie Primary School I; Okedo IV, Eyaenugie Primary School II; Okedo IV, Eyaenugie Primary School III; Okedo IV, Eyaenugie Primary School IV; Okedo IV, Eyaenugie Primary School V; Okedo IV, Eyaenugie Primary School VI; Okedo IV, Eyaenugie Primary School VII; Ikpoba I, Edo College I; Ikpoba I, Edo College II; Ikpoba I, Edo College III; Ikpoba I, Edo College IV; Ikpoba I, Edo College V
Oredo	Ikpema/Eguadase	Ikpema/Eguadase I, Igbesamwan Primary School I; Ikpema/Eguadase I, Igbesamwan Primary School II; Ikpema/Eguadase I, Igbesamwan Primary School III; Ikpema/Eguadase I, Igbesamwan Primary School IV; Ikpema/Eguadase I, Igbesamwan Primary School V; Ikpema/Eguadase I, Igbesamwan Primary School VI; Ikpema/Eguadase I, Igbesamwan Primary School VII; Ikpema/Eguadase I, Igbesamwan Primary School VIII; Ikpema/Eguadase I, Igbesamwan Primary School IX; Ikpema/Eguadase I, Igbesamwan Primary School X; Ikpema/Eguadase I, Igbesamwan Primary School XI; Ikpema/Eguadase I, Igbesamwan Primary School XII; Ikpema/Eguadase II, Igbesamwan Primary School XIII; Ikpema/Eguadase II, Igbesamwan Primary School XIV; Ikpema/Eguadase II, Igbesamwan Primary School XV; Ikpema/Eguadase II, Igbesamwan Primary School XVI; Ikpema/Eguadase II, Igbesamwan Primary School XVII; Ikpema/Eguadase II, Igbesamwan Primary School XVIII; Ikpema/Eguadase II, Igbesamwan Primary School XIX; Ikpema/Eguadase II, Igbesamwan Primary School XX; Ikpema/Eguadase II, Igbesamwan Primary School XXI; Ikpema/Eguadase II, Igbesamwan Primary School XXII; Ikpema/Eguadase II, Igbesamwan Primary School XXIII; Ikpema/Eguadase II, Igbesamwan Primary School XXIV; Ikpema/Eguadase II, Igbesamwan Primary School XXV
Oredo	Unueru/Ogboka	Ogboka/Unueru I, Asoro Primary School I; Ogboka/Unueru I, Asoro Primary School II; Ogboka/Unueru I, Asoro Primary School III; Ogboka/Unueru I, Asoro Primary School IV; Ogboka/Unueru I, Asoro Primary School V; Ogboka/Unueru I, Asoro Primary School VI; Ogboka/Unueru I, Asoro Primary School VII; Ogboka/Unueru I, Asoro Primary School V III; Ogboka/Unueru II Oza Primary School I; Ogboka/Unueru II Oza Primary School II; Ogboka/Unueru I I, Oza Primary School III; Ogboka/Unueru I I, Oza Primary School IV; Ogboka/Unueru I I, Oza Primary School V; Ogboka/Unueru I I, Oza Primary School VI; Ogboka/Unueru I I, Oza Primary School VII; Ogboka/Unueru I I, Oza Primary School VIII; Ogboka/Unueru II, Oza Primary School IX; Ogboka/Unueru I I, Oza Primary School X; Ogboka/Unueru I I, Oza Primary School XI; Ogboka/Unueru III, Uwa Primary School I; Ogboka/Unueru III, Uwa Primary School II; Ogboka/Unueru III, Uwa Primary School III; Ogboka/Unueru III, Uwa Primary School IV; Ogboka/Unueru III, Uwa Primary School V; Ogboka/Unueru III, Uwa Primary School VI; Ogboka/Unueru III, Uwa Primary School VII; Ogboka/Unueru III, Urubi Primary School I; Ogboka/Unueru III, Urubi Primary School II
Oredo	Ogbelaka/ Nekpenekpen	Ogbelaka I, Imaguero College I; Ogbelaka I, Imaguero College II; Ogbelaka I, Imaguero College III; Ogbelaka I, Imaguero College IV; Ogbelaka II, Oredo Girls Sc. School I; Ogbelaka II, Oredo Girls Sc. School II; Ogbelaka II, Oredo Girls Sc. School III; Ogbelaka II, Oredo Girls Sc. School IV; Ogbelaka III, Arinze Primary School I; Ogbelaka III, Arinze Primary School II; Ogbelaka III, Arinze Primary School III; Ogbelaka III, Arinze Primary School IV; Ogbelaka II, I Arinze Primary School V; Ogbelaka III, Arinze Primary School VI; Ogbelaka III, Arinze Primary School VII; Ogbelaka III, Arinze Primary School VIII; Isiemwenro, B. D. P. A. Premises I; Isiemwenro, B. D. P. A. Premises II; Isiemwenro, B. D. P. A. Premises III; Isiemwenro, B. D. P. A. Premises IV; Isiemwenro, B. D. P. A. Premises V; Uhunmudumu I, Ohuoba Primary School I; Uhunmudumu I, Ohuoba Primary School II; Uhunmudumu I, Ohuoba Primary School III; Uhunmudumu I, Ohuoba Primary School IV; Uhunmudumu I, Ohuoba Primary School V; Uhunmudumu, II I. C. C.- I; Uhunmudumu, II I. C. C. -II; Uhunmudumu II I. C. C. - III; Uhunmudumu III, Iguodala Pry. Sch. I; Uhunmudumu III, Iguodala Pry. Sch. II; Uhunmudumu III, Iguodala Pry. Sch. III
Oredo	Ibiwe/ Iwegie/ Ugbague	Ibiwe I, Oba Mkt. Premises I; Ibiwe I, Oba Mkt. Premises II; Ibiwe I, Oba Mkt. Premises III; Ibiwe I, Oba Mkt. Premises IV; Ibiwe I, Oba Mkt Premises V; Ibiwe I Oba Mkt. Premises VI; Ugbague I Fire Services (Forestry) I Ugbague I -; Ugbague I Fire Services (Forestry) II Ugbague I -; Ugbague I Fire Services (Forestry) III Ugbague I -; Ugbague I Fire Services (Forestry) IV Ugbague I -; Ugbague I Fire Services (Forestry) V Ugbague I -; Ugbague I Fire Services (Forestry) VI Ugbague I -; Ugbague I Fire Services (Forestry) VII Ugbague I -; Ugbague I Fire Services (Forestry) VIII Ugbague I -; Ugbague I Fire Services (Forestry) IX; Ugbague I Fire Services (Forestry) X Ugbague I -; Ugbague I Fire Services (Forestry) XI Ugbague I -; Ugbague I Fire Services (Forestry) XII Ugbague I -; Ugbague I Fire Services (Forestry) XIII Ugbague I -; Ugbague I Fire Services (Forestry) XIV Ugbague I -; Iwegie I, Agbado Primary School I; Iwegie I, Agbado Primary School II; Iwegie I, Agbado Primary School III; Iwegie I, Agbado Primary School IV; Iwegie I, Agbado Primary School V; Iwegie I, Agbado Primary School VI; Iwegie, Agbado Primary School I; Iwegie, Agbado Primary School II; Iwegie, Agbado Primary School III; Iwegie, Agbado Primary School IV
Orhionmwon	Aibiokunla I	Obaseki Primary School, Abudu I; Obaseki Primary School, Abudu II; Obaseki Primary School, Abudu III; Ago-Ogbeide Village Hall; Esigie College, Abudu I; Esigie College, Abudu II; Evbobanosa P/S, Evbobanosa I; Evbobanosa P/S, Evbobanosa II; Uwemuwe P/S, Uwemuwe; Licy P/S, Ossiomo; Alophanme City Hall, Ossiomo; Ewuare P/S, Ogan I; Ewuare P/S, Ogan II; Ewuare P/S, Ogan III
Orhionmwon	Aibiokunla II	Evbohen P/S, Evbohen; Iru P/S, Iru I; Iru P/S, Iru II; Iru P/S, Iru III; Iguehenza P/S, Iguehenza; Odionza P/S, Oza; Odionza P/S, Eguehenza; Oza P/S, Oza I; Oza P/S, Oza II; Oza P/S, Oza III; Oza P/S, Oza IV; Oza P/S, Oza V
Orhionmwon	Ugbeka	Elaka P/S. Idunmunlaka I; Elaka P/S. Idunmunlaka II; Ugbeka College, Evboehighe I; Ugbeka College, Evboehighe II; Evboeghae P/S, Evboeghae I; Evboeghae P/S, Evboeghae II; Eguaogieghae Town Hall; Okuor P/S, Okuor I; Okuor P/S, Okuor II; Idunmwongo P/S, Idunmwongo; Otobaye P/S, Otobaye; Oheze P/S, Ute - Oteze I; Oheze P/S, Ute - Oteze II; Adolo P/S, Oheze - Naka I; Adolo P/S, Oheze - Naka II; Oloten P/S, Oloten, Oloten I; Oloten P/Sch. Oloten, Oloten II; Evbomede P/Sch. Evbomede; Uson P/Sch., Uson; Amas Village Hall, Amas; Obagie P/Sch., Obagie
Orhionmwon	Iyoba	Evbobemwen P/Sch., Evbobemwen I; Evbobemwen P/Sch., Evbobemwen II; Evbobemwen P/Sch., Evbobemwen III; Evbokabua P/Schol, Evbokabua I; Evbokabua P/School, Evbokabua II; Evbokabua P/School, Evbokabua III; Evbokabua P/School, Evbokabua IV; Evbokabua P/School, Evbokabua V; Evbokabuap/School, Evbokabua VI; Otobaye II Village Hall I; Otobaye II Village Hall II; Ugbokhirima P/School I; Ugbokhirima P/School II; Egbokor P/Sch., Egbokor I; Egbokor P/Sch., Egbokor II
Orhionmwon	Ugboko	Adanako P/School, Ugo; Old Council Hall, Ugo; Old Dispensary, Ugo; Ugbukuen P/School, Ugo I; Ugbukuen P/School, Ugo II; Ibieguae Village Square, Ugo; Ugbugo P/School Ugbugo I; Ugbugo Town Hall I; Ugbugo P/School, Ugbugo II; Ugbugo, Ugbugo Town Hall II; Ugboko Niro P/Sch., Ugboko Niro I; Ugboko Niro P/Sch., Ugboko Niro II; Ugbokoniro P/Sch., Ugboko Niro III; Ikpeba Camp Hall, Ikpeba Camp; Obozogbe- Niro P/Sch., Ugboko - Niro I; Obozogbe- Niro P/Sch., Ugboko - Niro II; Obozogbe- Niro P/Sch. Ugboko - Niro III; Obozogbe- Niro P/Sch., Ugboko - Niro IV; Obozogbe Niro P/Sch. Ugboko - Niro V; Ugboko-Numagbae P/Sch. Ugboko Numagbae I; Ugboko-Numagbae P/Sch., Ugboko Numagbae II; Oteleku Camp Hall, Oteleku; Idunmeke Town Hall, Idunmeke I; Idunmeke Town Hall, Idunmeke II; Ugbighele P/School; Iguododo P/School; Eso P/School, Idumebo I; Eso P/School, Idumebo II
Orhionmwon	Ukpato	Okogbo P/School, Okogbo I; Okogbo P/School, Okogbo II; Evbuehia Village Hall; Iguere P/School, Iguere I; Iguere P/School, Iguere II; Avbiugo Primary School; Agowie Village Hall; Evbarhue P/School Evbarhue; Idu City Hall; Idunmumowina P/School Idunm-Owina I; Idunmumowina P/School, Idunm-Owina II; Igbekhue P/School, Idunmu-Owina; Forestry Hall, Sakponba; Ona Town Hall; Pamol Estate Hall I; Pamol Estate Hall II; Pamol Estate Hall III; Evbuosa P/School Evbuosa, Iguemokhua; Abe Village Hall, Iguemokhua; Iguemokhua P/School Iguemokhua; Evbueka Village Hall; Aideyanba P/School, Sakpoba I; Aideyanba P/School, Sakpoba II
Orhionmwon	Urhonigbe North	Iyobasa P/School Uromehe I; Iyobasa P/School Uromehe II; Iyobasa P/School Uromehe III; Idumwongo P/School Urhonigbe I; Idumwongo P/School Urhonigbe II; Idumwongo P/School Urhonigbe III; Idumwongo P/School Urhonigbe IV; Akugbe Primary School I; Akugbe Primary School II; Akugbe Primary School III; Old Modern; Ovbiebo Camp Square; Estate Quarters; Idale P/School Idale
Orhionmwon	Urhonigbe South	Okaro P/School Urhonigbe I; Okaro P/School Urhonigbe II; Okaro P/School Urhonigbe III; Egbo Street Square; Umugbo Square; Umugbo Town Hall; Old Council Hall, Urhonigbe; Umweni Camp Hall; Edogun P/School Hall I; Edogun P/School Hall II; Edogun P/School Hall III; Edogun P/School Hall IV; Enigbe P/School Hall V; Enigbe P/School Hall VI; Enigbe P/School Hall VII
Orhionmwon	Ugu	Umoghun - Nokhua P/Sch, Umoghun-Nokhua I; Umoguhn - Nokhua P/Sch, Umoghun - Nokhua II; Obowen P/School, Ologbo; Obozogbe - Nugu Primary Scho0l I; Obozogbe - Nugu Primary Scho0l II; Iguelaba P/School, Iguelaba I; Iguelaba P/School, Iguelaba II; New Market Square - Iguelaba; Ukpakele Town Hall, Ukpakele; Oben P/School, Urhehue - Oben; Urhehue P/School, Urhehue; Health Centre, Urhehue; Ikobi P/School, Ikobi; Esoe P/School, Orogho; Health Centre Orogho; Orogho Grammar School; Okhuere P/School, Owuo - Orogho; Obanakhoro P/School, Obanakhoro; Ugbigun P/ School, Ugbigun; Ato P/School, Iwevbo; Obagie P/School, Obagie I; Obagie P/School, Obagie II
Orhionmwon	Evboesi	Idusi P/School Evboesi I; Idusi P/School Evboesi II; Obazagbon - Nugu P/School Evboesi; Camp 34 Square; Aiwagu Ore P/School, Evboesi I; Aiwagu Ore P/School, Evboesi II; Aiwagu Ore P/School, Evboesi III; Eveonogbon Town Hall, Eveonogbon; Ogba - Nugu P/School; Ogba - Nugu Town Hall I; Ogba - Nugu Town Hall II; Umoghua - Zuagbor P/School I; Umoghua - Zuagbor P/School II
Orhionmwon	Igbanke East	Ake P/School Ake, Igbanke I; Ake P/School Ake, Igbanke II; Igbanke Grammar School; Aguba Hall Ozuke; Obiogba P/School, Ake I; Obiogba P/School, Ake II; Omu-Ogba Hall; Wire - Ake P/School, Wire - Ake I; Wire - Ake P/School, Wire - Ake II; Enogie P/School Oligie I; Enogie P/School Oligie II; Benin Baptist School Oligie; Osafile P/School Ottah I; Aguba Hall, Ottah; Osafile P/School, Ottah
Orhionmwon	Igbanke West	Igbontor P/School, Igbontor I; Igbonor P/School, Igbontor II; Central P/School, Igbanke I; Central P/School, Igbanke II; Idumu - Iru Comm. Hall, Idumu Iru I; Idumu - Iru Comm. Hall, Idumu Iru II; Enogie P/School, Omolua I; Enogie P/School, Omolua II; Omolua Comm. Hall I; Omolua Comm. Hall II; Omolua Comm. Hall III; Onuiyi P/School, Onuiyi I; Onuiyi P/School, Onuiyi II; Community Hall, Idumodin I; Ogodineze Hall, Idumodin II; Orogho Grammar School, Orogho
Ovia North East	Okada West	Okada, Ikaladerhan Primary School I; Okada, Ikaladerhan Primary School II; Okada, Okada Grammar School I; Okada, Okada Grammar School II; Iguomo, Ovonramwen Primary School
Ovia North East	Okada East	Ugbokun, Ugbokun Primary School; Iyanomo, Iyanomo Primary School; Iguiye - Obanosa Primary School; Iguobo, Oboh Primary School I; Iguobo, Oboh Primary School II; Isiuwa, Ehiaghe Primary School; Egboha, Egboha
Ovia North East	Uhen	Egbeta, Egbeta P/School I; Egbeta, Egbeta P/School II; Utesse, Ogiyan Primary School; Ugbuwe Eghianruwa Primary School; Uhen, Health Centre; Uhen, Arazuwa Primary School; Ogbesse, Edaiken Primary School; Olumoye, Ose Primary School
Ovia North East	Adolor	Ekiadolor, Opposite College Of Education I; Ekiadolor, Opposite College Of Education II; Ekiadolor Cooperative House; Ekiadolor Adolor Primary School; Ekiadolor Ekiadolor Sec. School; Ovbiogie, Ekhibi Primary School I; Ovbiogie, Ekhibi Primary School II; Ovbiogie, Ekhibi Primary School III; Isiukhukhu, Obanokhua Primary School; Ora-Ifon, Ezomo College; Iyowa, Ezuwarha Primary School; Eko-Abetu Elukotun Primary School; Ukpoke, Ukpoke Village Hall; Utekon, Ise Primary School I; Utekon, Ise Primary School II; Utekon, Ise Primary School III
Ovia North East	Ofunmwegbe	Iwu Egbaen Primary School I; Iwu Egbaen Primary School II; Iwu Egbaen Primary School III; Iwu Egbaen Primary School IV; Iwu Egbaen Primary School V; Iguosagie Ohenhen Primary School I; Iguosagie Ohenhen Primary School II; Ofunmwegbe Ikuobase Primary School
Ovia North East	Oluku	Okhumwun Elaba Primary School; Oluku, Eresoyen Primary School I; Oluku, Eresoyen Primary School II; Oluku, Eresoyen Primary School III; Isiohor, Army Children School I; Isiohor, Army Children School II; Idumwowina, Owina Primary School; Ugbowo, Uniben Staff School I; Ugbowo, Uniben Staff School II; Ugbowo, Uniben Staff School III; Ekosodin, Ekosodin Primary School I; Ekosodin, Ekosodin Primary School II; Ekosodin, Ekosodin Primary School III
Ovia North East	Uhiere	Obazuwa II, Obazuwa II; Aihuobabekun, Crowther Primary School; Obarenren, Odaro Primary School I; Obarenren, Odaro Primary School II; Okhuen Camp, Okhuen Camp; Okhuo Erediauwa Grammar. School; Idumwenhigie Idumwenhigie P/School; Osasimwionba Imadiyi P/School; Eko-Ekpetin, Eko-Ekpetin Village Square; Igbekhue, Osaro P/School; Odighi, Amayo Primary School I; Odighi, Amayo Primary School II; Odiguetue, Ehi P/School; Uhiere, Ikpesira P/School; Owan, Owan P/School; Agbanikaka, Market Place; Ofitebe, Ofitebe
Ovia North East	Isiuwa	Nifor, Isiuwa P/School I; Nifor, Isiuwa P/School II; Nifor, Isiuwa P/School III; Evboneka, Akugbe P/School; Evboneka, Payne P/School; Ugbogiobo, Ogiobo P/School; Eko-Nobore, Nobore P/School; Uwan, Uwan P/School; Ozuguo, Esigie P/School; Azalama, Azalama; Uniaro, Aro P/Schol
Ovia North East	Okokhuo	Okokhuo, Okokhuo P/School I; Okokhuo, Okokhuo P/School II; Okokhuo, Okokhuo P/School III; Abumwenre, Ozolua P/School; Abumwenre, Town Hall; Agemokpae, Agemokpae; Emah, Emah P/School; Ugboke, Ugboke Pry. Sch.; Iguogho, Ogho Pry. Sch.; Agekpanu, Odiase Pry. Sch.; Ugbokuli, Ugbokuli; Iguhoro, Oriri Primary School
Ovia North East	Oghede	Iguogie, Iguogie Primary School; Orovie, Ogun Pry. Sch.; Evboro, Adolor Pry. Sch.; Obazuwa, Obazuwa Pry. Sch.; Ikoro, Ikoro Pry. Sch.; Igbobi, Nikaro Pry. Sch.; Oghede, Oghede Pry. Sch.; Agivbiigie, Agivbiigie; Igo, Igo Primary School; Ekenwan Barracks, Army Children's School I; Ekenwan Barracks, Army Children's School II; Ekenwan Barracks, Army Children's School III; Iguehie, Edegbe Pry. Sch.
Ovia North East	Oduna	Urhuokhokho, Ikaladerhan Pry. Sch; Ugbineh, Aken Pry. Sch I; Ugbineh, Aken Pry. Sch. II; Oduna, Eweka Pry. Sch.; Eghudu, Eghudu Pry. Sch.; Egbatan, Otiku Pry. Sch.; Ikpako, Obanosa Pry. Sch.; Ekenwan Orogbua P/School; Ughoton, Erediauwa P/School; Evbuorokho, Evbuorokho; Gele-Gele Osa P/Schol; Danikoro Danikoro P/ School; Sallogun, Sallogun
Ovia North East	Iguoshodin	Iguoshodin-Nebudin, Iguoshodin-Nebudin P/Sch.; Parkers Camp, Iguoshodin Nebudin P/Sch.; Iyekeze Obanosa P/School; Agbonmoba, Okungbowa P/School; Obayantor, Obakpolor P/School; Iguoshodin-Nigbemaba - Iguoshodin-Nigbemaba P/School; Iguesogban- Osayande Primary School; Iguzama, Iguzama Primary School; Unuamen, Esigie Primary School; Iguadolor, Aruosa Primary School; Uhogua, Uhogua Primary School; Ogeghe, Ogheghe Primary School; Obagie, Eweka Primary School
Ovia North East	Utoka	Ovah, Ohen-Osa Primary School I; Ovah, Ohen-Osa Primary School II; Utoka, Aruigie Primary School I; Utoka, Aruigie Primary School II; Utoka, Aruigie Primary School III; Ite, Ite Primary School; Agiyoba Imose Primary School; Aguwangue, Aguwangue
Ovia South West	Iguobazuwa East	Iguobazuwa, Ozolua P/School I; Iguobazuwa, Ozolua P/School II; Iguobazuwa, Ozolua P/School III; Iguobazuwa, Ozolua P/School IV; Aifesoba, Aifesoba Village; Iguogun, Obe P/School; Iguatakpa I, Okunzuwa P/School; Iguatakpa II, Yoruba Camp; Okunzuwa, Okunzuwa Village
Ovia South West	Iguobazuwa West	Iguobazuwa, Iguobazuwa G/S; Iguobazuwa, Min. Of Education I; Iguobazuwa, Min. Of Education II; Iguobazuwa, Min. Of Education III; Obazumamwen, Obazumamwen Village; Okoro II, Okoro P/School; Okokpon, Okokpon P/School; Obaretin, Okpon P/School
Ovia South West	Umaza	Umaza, Adolo P/School; Obobaifo, Obobaifo P/School; Essi Umolua P/School; Sayo, Sayo Village; Iguosa, Iguosa Primary School; Aiguobasimwin, Oha P/School; Ojumu, Okua P/School; Iguelaiho, Obahiagbon P/School; Ugbokua, Ugbokua Village; Iguerhohon, Akugbe P/School I; Iguerhohon, Akugbe P/School II
Ovia South West	Siluko	Siluko, Siluko P/School; Siluko, Siluko G/S; Siluko, Siluko Postal Agency; Abieyi, Abieyi Primary/School I; Abieyi, Abieyi Primary School II; Iguagbado, Agbado P/School; Madagbayo, Omozaye P/School; Ejide Water Side, Dauyomo P/School; Gbelemoten Inland, Dominju P/School; Ejor-Okomu, Ejor P/School; Safarogbo, Oha P/School; Gbelebu- Gbelebu P/School
Ovia South West	Ora	Iguokolo/Ikpoba, Akugbe P/School; Ora, Ozolua P/School; Amieghomwan Village; Iguoriakhi Up Hill, Oriakhi P/Scho0l; Osse, Osse River Primary School; Iguoriakhi Waterside, Or Iakhi P/School)
Ovia South West	Usen	Usen, Osaseyi P/School I; Usen, Osaseyi P/School II; Usen, Elawure G/S; Usen, Ogidigbo Quarters; Okoro I, Okoro Primary School; Ulurin, Obakpolor P/School I; Ulurin, Obakpolor P/School II; Ogunmwenyi, Omozogie P/School; Usen, Atamabale P/School; Okpa, Azagba P/School; Adeyanba, Adeyanba Village
Ovia South West	Ugbogui	Ugbogui, Ulah P/School; Ugbogui, Igbinoba, P/School I; Ugbogui, Igbinoba, P/School II; Ugbogui, Igbinoba, P/School III; Evbonogbon, Evbonogbon Primary School; Ikoka I, Esigie P/School I; Ikoka II, Esigie P/School (Adebayo) II; Agbonbayemwen, Akenzua P/Sch00l; Iguobanor, Iguobanor Village; Aden, Aden River P/School; Igbobor, Abesi P/School; Okponha, Okponha P/School; Ofumwengbe Town (Ofumwengbe)
Ovia South West	Ofunama	Ajakurama, Ajakurama P/School; Abere, Abere Primary School; Itagbene, Itagbene Primary School; Ofunama, Egbema P/School; Binidodogha, Binidodogha Primary School; Gbelukanga, Gbelukanga P/School; Gbeoba, Gbeoba Primary School; Torukubu, Torukubu Primary School
Ovia South West	Nikorogha	Ugbo, Ovia Primary School; Aiguobasimwinotor(Aiguobasimwinotor Village); Nikorogha, Olodiama P/School; Asamara, Igbinoba P/School; Awori, Awori Village; Jamagie, Ogondi P/School; Ajefie, Ajefie P/School
Owan East	Emai I	Inst. Of Phy Education, Afuze I; Inst. Of Phy Education, Afuze II; Space By Motor Park, Afuze; Space By I. P. E. Hostel, Afuze; Maternity Centre, Afuze I; Maternity Centre, Afuze II; Pub. Field Gallary, Afuze; Ohobo Primary School, Afuze I; Ohobo Primary School, Afuze II; Space By Small Market, Afuze; Opposite Palace Ground, Afuze; Emai Primary School, Afuze I; Emai Primary School, Afuze II
Owan East	Emai II	Ownu Primary School, Ovbiomu I; Ownu Primary School, Ovbiomu II; Igbira Camp, Ojavun; Eghu Primary School, Ojavun I; Eghu Primary School, Ojavun II; Okpokhomi Primary School, Ojavun I; Okpokhomi Primary School, Ojavun II; Ogute Primary School, Ogute I; Ogute Primary School, Ogute II; Obada Primary School, Evbiamen I; Obada Primary School, Evbiamen II; St. James Ora School, Uahomi I; St. James Ora School, Uahomi II; Eteye Primary School, Eteye
Owan East	Ihievbe I	Ivbieve Primary School, Ihievbe I; Ivbieve Primary School, Ihievbe II; Near Motor Garage, Ihievbe; Oboh Intn School, Ihievbe; Maternity Centre, Ihievbe; Space By Customary Court, Ihievbe I; Space By Customary Court, Ihievbe II; Market Square Ivbiore, Ogha; Customary Court, Edon Road; Obokhuoduma Primary School, Ihievbe; Emabun Igbira Camp, Ihievbe
Owan East	Ihievbe II	Otuajabor Primary School, Otua I; Otuajabor Primary School, Otua II; Otuajabor Primary School, Otua III; Ekhueye Primary School, Ekhueye I; Ekhueye Primary School, Ekhueye II; Osamaran P/School, Okhuame I; Osamaran P/School, Okhuame II; Osamaran Field, Okhuame; Primary School, Ogben I; Primary School, Ogben II; Igbira Camp Along Igara Rd., Ogbon I; Igbira Camp Along Igara Rd., Ogbon II
Owan East	Uokha/Ake	Odion Primary School, Uokha I; Odion Primary School, Uokha II; Uokha Maternity (Field), Uokha; Space Near Y. Maternity, Uokha; Eweka Primary School, Uokha I; Eweka Primary School, Uokha II; Open Field Eweka P/School, Uokha; Lawani Camp, Uokha; Ake Primary School, Ake I; Ake Primary School, Ake II; Health Centre, Ake; Open Space By Ake Market; Ake Igboro, Ake; Otugo Grammar School, Ake; Owa Village Square, Ake
Owan East	Igue/Ikao	Anama P/School, Igue-Oke; Sadiku Igbira Camp, Igue-Oke; Near Cocoa Store, Igue-Oke; Eweya P/School, Igue-Sale; Market Square, Igue-Sale; Igbira Camp, Igue-Sale; Inumai Primary School, Ikao I; Inumai Primary School, Ikao II; Inumai Primary School, Ikao III; Inumai Primary School, L Ikao IV; Atemonokhai Primary School, Ikao; Utho Village Squar, Ikao I; Utho Village Square, Ikao II
Owan East	Ivbimion	Akugbe Primary School, Arokho I; Akugbe Primary School, Arokho II; Akugbe Primary School, Arokho III; Near Market Square, Arokho; Market Square, Arokho; Igbira Camp, Arokho; Ekpenga Pry. School, Arokho; Ekpenga Field, Arokho; Yisa Camp, Arokho; Motor Park, Arokho; Near Motor Cam, Arokho; Iruoke Village Square, Arokho; Ubiale Primary School, Uroe; Iyaka Camp, Uroe; Ivbigun Primary School, Ohanmi; Igbifun Primary School, Ohanma; Ohanmi Village Square, Ohanmi
Owan East	Otuo I	Near Imafun New Site, Otuo; Town Hall, Otuo; Near The Town Hall, Otuo; By Oluma Motor Park, Otuo; Oluma Town Hall, Otuo; Otuo Dispensary (Field), Otuo; Aloho Azama College Road, Otuo; Aloho Azama Open Space, Otuo; Near Maternity Centre, Otuo; Ugba Town Square, Otuo; Idesa Primary School, Otuo; Olila Town Hall, Otuo; Ishiokha Town Hall, Otuo; Ighera Town Hall, Otuo; Ikhueran Town Hall, Otuo; Idesa Primary School, Otuo
Owan East	Otuo II	Imoukpe Town Hall, Otuo; Women Centre, Otuo; Imakhize Play Ground, Otuo I; Imakhize Play Ground, Otuo II; Uzawa Town Hall, Otuo I; Uzawa Town Hall, Otuo II; Osiekepa Town Hall, Otuo; Ohigba Town Hall, Otuo; Amoya Town Hall, Otuo; Town Square, Otuo; Imarohe Town Hall, Otuo; Imovie Town Square, Otuo; Amohon Quarters, Otuo; Ogholugbo Primary School, Otuo; Ayetoro Isumede (Isisi Camp); Ago-Ogbodo Primary School, Otuo
Owan East	Ivbiadaobi	Ivbiolwco Primary School, Erah I; Ivbiolwco Primary School, Erah II; Erah Grammar School, Erah I; Erah Grammar School, Erah II; Oamen Primary School, Erah; Eswriri Primary School, Erah; Ekeke Primary School, Erah; Igbira Camp Ekeke, Eran; Near Bawa'S Compound, Ivbiaro; Maternity Centre, Ivbiaro; Ese Primary School, Ivbiaro I; Ese Primary School, Ivbiaro II; Emokpaere Primary School, Ivbiaro; Usun Primary School, Ivbiaro I; Usun Primary School, Ivbiaro II; Usun Primary School, Ivbiaro III; Emokpaere Primary School, Ovbiaro
Owan East	Warrake	Customary Court, Warrake; Near Customary Court, Warrake; Space By Customary Court, Warrake; Near Coco Produce Store, Warrake; Ugbevboje Primary School, Warrake; Market Square B/W Afokoso, Warrake; Agbalosun Primary School, Warrake; Igbira Camp Iyakhara; Maternity Centre, Warrake; Market Square B/W Uzofor, Warrake; Market Square Proper, Warrake; Near Cocoa Produce Store, Iyadon
Owan West	Ozalla	Under A Tree By No. 19 Uhonmora Road, Ozalla; Orhuen Primary School, Ozalla I; Orhuen Primary School, Ozalla II; Ozalla Primary School Ozalla III; Ozalla Primary School Ozalla IV; C. R. I. N Primary School, Ozalla; Ekweran Camp, Ozalla; Ukato Camp, Ozalla
Owan West	Uhonmora	Owere Primary School, Uhonmora I; Owere Primary School, Uhonmora II; Owere Primary School, Uhonmora III; Okpo Primary School, Uhonmora I; Okpo Primary School, Uhonmora II; Okpo Primary School, Uhonmora III; Space Near Uhonmora Town Hall, Uhonmora I; Space Near Uhonmora Town Hall, Uhonmora II; By Omueben Rd., Uhonmora; Eben Primary School, Uhonmora I; Eben Primary School, Uhonmora II; Eben Primary School, Uhonmora III; Eben Primary School, Uhonmora IV
Owan West	Eme-Ora/Oke	Ohia Town Hall, Eme-Ora; Uguanroba P/School, Eme-Ora; St Mary'S Gram. School, Eme-Ora I; St Mary'S Gram. School, Eme-Ora II; Odeije P/School, Eme-Ora I; Odeije P/School, Eme-Ora II; Town Hall, Eme - Ora I; Town Hall, Eme - Ora II; Owato P/School, Oke Old I; Owato P/School, Oke Old II; Owato P/School, Oke Old III; Ebule/Ugbiriri I; Ebule/Ugbiriri II; Ikhide Hospital Field; Near Oke New Market I; Near Oke New Market II; Owato Primary School Oke New I; Owato Primary School Oke New II
Owan West	Sabongida/Ora/Ogbeturu	Holy Trinity G/School, Sabongida Ora; Evbiobe Central Sch., Sabongida Ora I; Evbiobe Central Sch., Sabongida Ora II; Beside Customary Court, Sabongidda Ora; Evbobe P/School, Sabongidda Ora I; Evbobe P/School, Sabongidda Ora II; Obe P/School, Sabongidda Ora I; Obe P/School, Sabongidda Ora II; Obe P/School, Sabongidda Ora III; By Ovbiare Ikheode House, Sabongidda Ora I; By Ovbiare Ikheode House, Sabongidda Ora II; Ogwaidi By Idumu, Sabongidda Ora I; Ogwaidi By Idumu, Sabongidda Ora II; Ugbubezi P/School, Ugbubedo I; Ugbubezi P/School, Ugbubedo II; Atoruru Camp P/School, Ugbubedo I; Atoruru Camp P/School, Ugbubedo II; Atoruru Camp P/School, Ugbubedo III; Atoruru Camp P/School, Ugbubedo IV
Owan West	Avbiosi	Ehoro P/School, Avbiosi I; Ehoro P/School, Avbiosi II; Ehoro P/School, Avbiosi III; Ivleha Primary School, Avbiosi I; Ivleha Primary School, Avbiosi II; Ivleha Primary School, Avbiosi III; Umende Primary School, Avbiosi I; Umende Primary School, Avbiosi II; Umende Primary School, Avbiosi III; Ugbada Camp P/School, Avbiosi I; Ugbada Camp P/School, Avbiosi II; Obi Camp P/School, Avbiosi; Igbira Camp P/School, Avbiosi
Owan West	Ukhuse -Osi	Eteaseme Primary School, Ukhuse-Osi I; Eteaseme Primary School, Ukhuse-Osi II; Eteaseme Primary School, Okagbaro Ohia Ukhuse I; Eteaseme Primary School, Okagbaro Ohia Ukhuse II; Aweka Primary School, Ukhuse I; Aweka Primary School, Ukhuse II; Owara Primary School, Ukhuse I; Owara Primary School, Ukhuse II; Beside Adult Education Centre I; Beside Adult Education Centre II
Owan West	Eruere	Oseze Primary School, Eruere I; Oseze Primary School, Eruere II; Oseze Primary School, Eruere III; Ose -Camp(Along Eruere (Uhe Road) Eruere I; Ose -Camp(Along Eruere(Uhe Road), Eruere II; Open Field, Eruere I; Open Field, Eruere II
Owan West	Okpuje	Bore - Hole, Okpuje; Osaije Primary School, Okpuje I; Osaije Primary School, Okpuje II; Under A Tree Ivbiodohen, Okpuje; By Asikheode Ivbiodohen, Okpuje I; By Ivbiodohen Town Hal, Okpuje II; Islamic School Under A Tree, Igbira Camp; Islamic School Ivbiodohen, Igbira Camp I; Islamic School Ivbiodohen, Igbira Camp II; Efuare P/School, Avbioghola/Okpuje I; Efuare P/School, Avbioghola/Okpuje II; Oleke P/School, Ikpayan I; Oleke P/School, Ikpayan II; Ilevbioje P/School, Ikpayan I; Ilevbioje P/School, Ikpayan II; By Asikheode Avbiola/ Okpuju; Eguaoje Pry. Sch., Avbiola/ Okpuju I; Eguaoje P/School, Avbiola/Okpuju II
Owan West	Uzebba I	By Old Court Hall, Uzebba I; By Old Court Hall, Uzebba II; Oleguama P/School, Uzebba I; Oleguama P/School, Uzebba II; Uzebba Town Hall, Uzebba I; Uzebba Town Hall, Uzebba II; Back Of Area Council Office, Uzebba I; Back Of Area Council Office, Uzebba II; Near Oba'S Old House Uleyon Qts, Uzebba I; Near Oba'S Old House Uleyon Qts, Uzebba II; Mission Road By Ejekhile, Uzebba I; Mission Road By Ejekhile, Uzebba II
Owan West	Uzebba II	Okhaide P/School, Uzebba II- I; Okhaide P/School, Uzebba II- II; Unuehi Grammar School, Uzebba II- I; Grace Nursery School, Uzebba II - I; Grace Nursery School, Uzebba II - II; Umiehi Central School, Uzebba I; Umiehi Central School, Uzebba II; By Okada Park, Uzebba II - I; By Okada Park, Uzebba II - II
Owan West	Sobe	St Stephen'S P/School, Sobe; Alifan By Right, Sobe; Town Hall, Sobe; Near Odigie'S House, Sobe; Near Eguabor'S House By Right, Sobe; Alufe St. By Right, Sobe; L. A. School, Sobe; St. Eugene P/School, Sobe; Gold House By Right, Sobe; Opposite Magous House, Sobe; At Udogie By Right, Sobe I; At Udogie By Right, Sobe II; Ifidon By Right, Sobe; At Uwolo By Rght, Sobe; Isikhala By Right, Sobe I; Isikhala By Right, Sobe II; U. P. E. P/School Farm Settlement, Sobe; Near Odebah House Sobe
Uhunmwode	Ehor	Ugiamwen - Ugiamwen P/School; Ugiamwen - Ugiamwen Grammar School; Ukpogo- Ukpogo P/School; Ugbiyokho, Ugbiyokho P/School; Ehor - Aruosa Primary School; Ehor - Ogbe P/School; Ehor - Eguada P/School; Abumere Abumere P/School; Okemuen, Okemuen P/School; Ugbiyaya, Ugbiyaya P/School
Uhunmwode	Uhi	Ugieghudu, Esigie P/School; Egbisi, Egbisi (Open Space); Ugieghudu, Idia P/School; Ugieghudu, Town Hall; Obazagbon, Obazagbon P/School; Uhi, Baptist Primary School; Uhi, Idunmwunogo P/School; Uhi- Akugbe Primary School; Erhiborhibo - Erhiborhiro Primary School
Uhunmwode	Igieduma	Igieduma - Odogbo Primary School; Iriwe, Open Space; Erua -Ogiso Primary School; Erua, Old Erua Primary School; Uteni - Uteri Primary School; Ugha Ere Primary School; Obasogie - Obasogie Primary School
Uhunmwode	Irhue	Orhua, Orhuakhide Primary School; Orhua, Old R. C. M.; Oke, Idia Primary School; Oke, Old R. C. M. P/School; Irhue, Osaro Primary School; Umokpe - Umokpe Primary School; Ekpan - Ekpan Primary School
Uhunmwode	Umagbae North	Azagba - Aruosa Primary School; Ikhueniro, Uwa P/School; Iguomo - Iguomo Primary School; Igue-Uwangue Uwangue P/School; Irighon, Adagbafi Primary School; Iguozevbaru - Ehioze P/School; Iguovbiahianmwen -Aibueku P/School; Okhuo - Hatman Estate; Urhokuosa, Okuosa P/School; Evbuosa - Open Space; Iguovbiobo -Obasogie P/School
Uhunmwode	Umagbae South	Ahor - Akenzua P/School; Ekose, Ewedo Primary School; Orior - Owegie Primary School; Egba Aguebor P/School; Evbu-Iyamu -Town Hall; Iguosula - Obanosa P/School; Eyaen -Eyaen P/School; Uzala, Uzala P/School; Idunmwungha - Ase Primary /School; Ayen, Adolor P/School
Uhunmwode	Isi North	Eguaeholor, Isi Primary School; Eguaeholor, Eleihor G/School; Ekudo, Town Hall; Ohe, Ozua P/School; Okhuokhuo, Oviawe Primary School; Obanisi - Isi P/School; Uvbenisi -Uvbenisi P/School; Ogbahu Ogbahu Town Hall; Oghada, Oghada G/S; Oghada, Oghada P/School; Oghada, Ugbeze P/School
Uhunmwode	Isi South	Izikhirhi Alaghodaro P/School; Iguogbe - Iguogbe P/School; Ilobi, Ilobi Primary School; Okuokhuo -Okuokhuo Town Hall; Evbowe, Eghosa Primary School; Ewan, Ewan Towh Hall; Iguagban, Iguagban P/School
Uhunmwode	Ohuan	Evbozogbo, Evbozogbo P/School; Iguehana - Iguehana P/School; Erhuenehian, Erhuenehian P/School; Urhokuosa, Nowa Epen-Ide P/School; Evbuenek, Evbeneki Primary School; Obadan, M Obadan Mix Sec. School; Idibo, Idibo Primary School; Evbohuan - Evbohuan Primary School; Adesagbon, Adesagbon P/School; Udeni, Aiteguosa P/School
Uhunmwode	Egbede	Okhuaihe, Okeze P/School; Aduhanhan, Aduhanhan P/School; Ekhornuwaya, Open Space; Ekhorniguokuen, Aruosa P/School; Emuhen, Emuhen Primary School; Ugonoba, Ayobahan P/School; Ugoneki, Ugoneki P/School; Uvbe, Uvbe Primary School; Ugbogiri, Osula P/School
