= Gelegele =

Village in Edo State, Nigeria

Coordinates: 6°09′15″N 5°20′45″E

Gelegele (also spelt Gilli-Gilli) is a village located in Ovia North East Local Government Area of Edo State, Nigeria. The village is situated on the left flank of the Ovia (Osse) River and it shares boundary with Ughoton village. Gelegele is notable for its sea port on the river which was opened by Oba Ewuare the Great prior to the European exploration of the Great Benin Kingdom.

== Gelegele seaport ==
The Gelegele seaport holds an important place in the historic European exploration of Nigeria. During the reign of Oba Ewuare the Great, the Portuguese became the first European travelers to visit Benin through the Gelegele seaport in 1472 AD. This was followed by subsequent diplomatic and trade relations between the Portuguese and the great Benin Kingdom from 1504 to 1550 AD. In 1963, the Gelegele Seaport became known for its oil producing nature and played host to Philip's Oil Company Limited, a subsidiary of Philip 66 of Texas in the United States of America.

== Ownership dispute ==
In 2021, there were several reports of disputes regarding the ownership of Gelegele Community between the Benin and the Ijaws. In 2019, it was reported that half-clad women and youths of Gelegele community chased away over 50 police officers and construction workers from the riverine community as a result of the Gelegele ownership dispute between the Benin and Ijaw people. The Supreme Court of Nigeria had in 1983 delivered a judgement on the ownership dispute of Gelegele in favour of the Benins.

== Industrialisation and Chinese partnership ==
In 2018, the Edo State Government partnered with a Chinese-based company called China Harbour Engineering Company to develop and industrialise the Gelegele seaport in Benin City.
