= Imiekuri =

Imiekuri, Nigeria
- LGA
- Interactive map of Imiekuri, Nigeria
- Coordinates: 7°14′48″N 6°16′42″E
- Country: Nigeria
- State: Edo State
- Time zone: UTC+1 (WAT)

Imiekuri is a town in Okpella Etsako East, Edo, Nigeria. It is a village under the larger Okpella clan.

Imiekuri is largely an agrarian community, which is known for the large production of such cash crops as cocoa, bamboo, and palm oil. It is also known to be a large producer of yams, garri, mangoes, and more. It has the only cement company in the state, Edo Cement Company Limited.

== Villages ==
Imiekuri has 3 villages: Imianaba, Imikhokhoro, and Ilewi.
