= Uhogua =

Town in Edo State, Nigeria

Uhogua, Ovia North-East, Edo State.
- Town
- Location in Nigeria
- Coordinates: 6°39′N 5°37′E
- Country: Nigeria
- State: Edo State
- Time zone: UTC+1 (WAT)
- Climate: Aw

Uhogua is a populated town and is located in Ovia North-East Local Government Area in Edo State, Nigeria.

== Notable people ==
- Oba of Benin.
- HRH Osagumwenro Eki-Eresoyen, Enogie of Uhogua Dukedom.
