= Iguododo =

Iguododo, Orhionmwon, Edo State.
- town
- Location in Nigeria
- Coordinates: 6°13′N 6°0′E
- Country: Nigeria
- State: Edo State
- Time zone: UTC+1 (WAT)
- Climate: Aw

Iguododo is a populated town and is located in Orhionmwon Local Government Area in Edo State, Nigeria.

== Notable people ==
- Oba of Benin.
- Major Ise-erien (Rtd), Retired Major Nigerian Army.
- Pastor Osagie Ize-Iyamu, Politician, Pastor and Former Secretary to Edo State Government.
