= Okokhuo Village =

Community in Edo State, Nigeria

Coordinates: 6°35′07″N 5°36′20″E

Okokhuo Village is a community located in Ovia North-East Local Government Area of Edo State, Nigeria. It is among several Villages in Ovia North East Local Government Area that have suffered continuous herders` attack resulting in loss of properties.

== See also ==
- Edo people
