= Urohi =

Town in Edo State, Nigeria

Urohi sometimes spelt as Urhohi is a kingdom in Esan West Local Government Area of Edo State, Nigeria. It is among the several kingdoms in Esanland. The kingdom is governed by King called Onojie. In 2017, the sixteenth Onojie of Urohi Kingdom was installed, but celebrated his coronation in 2019.

== See also ==
- Esanland
- Esan people
