= Eso (town) =

Eso, Orhionmwon, Edo State.
- town
- Location in Nigeria
- Coordinates: 6°11′N 6°0′E
- Country: Nigeria
- State: Edo State
- Time zone: UTC+1 (WAT)
- Climate: Aw

Eso is a populated town and is located in Orhionmwon Local Government Area in Edo State, Nigeria.
