= Esan people =

Ethnic group in Nigeria

Esan people Ẹ̀bhò Ẹ̀sán
Esan
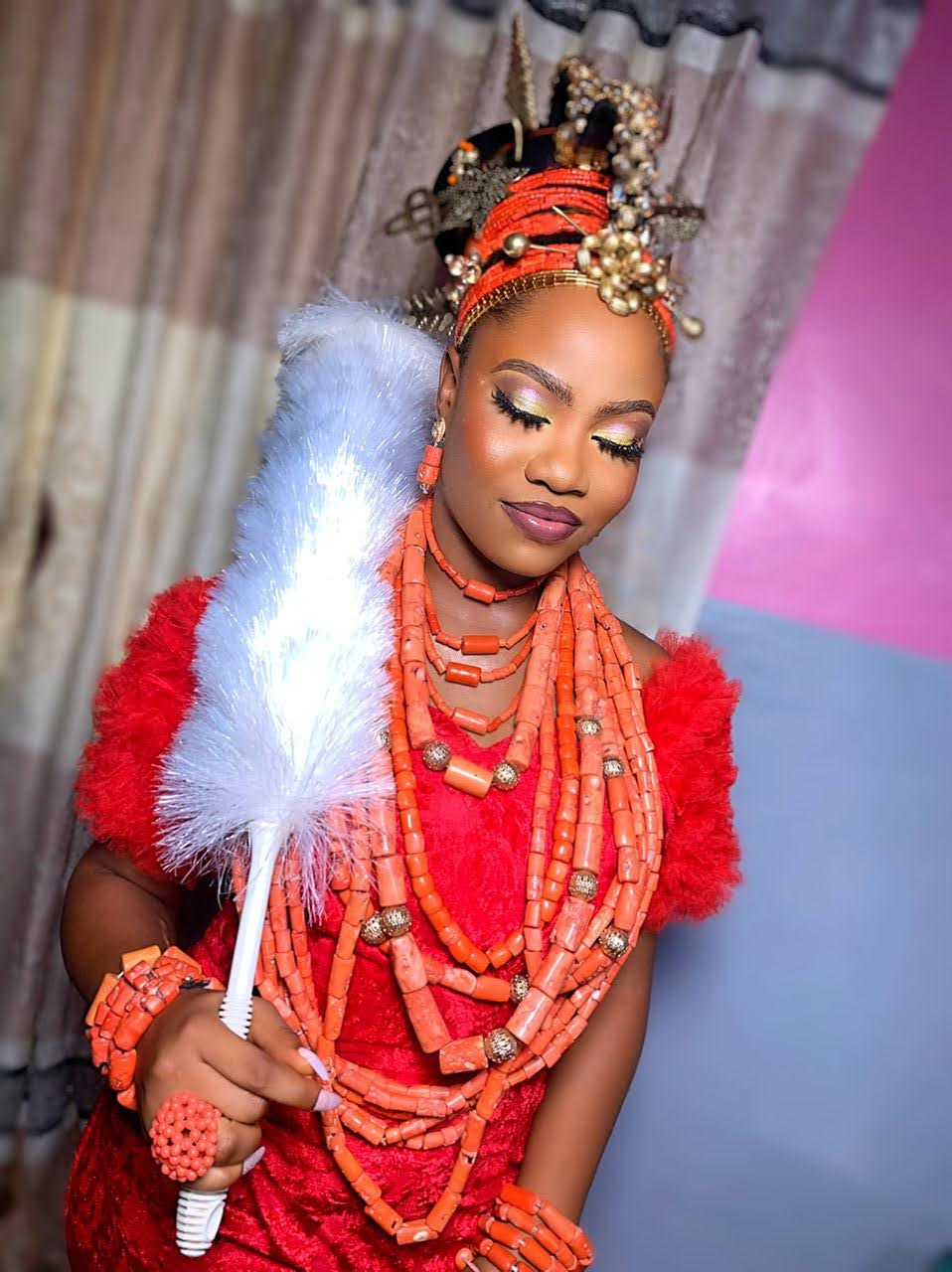
- Esan traditional attire

Total population
- c. 1,500,000

Regions with significant populations
- Nigeria: 1,500,000

Languages
- Esan and English

Religion
- Christianity 98%; Islam 1%; Traditional African religion 1%

Related ethnic groups
- Benin, Afemai, Urhobo, Isoko

The Esan people are an ethnic group native to Nigeria, primarily residing in the Edo Central Senatorial District, a plateau region approximately 136 metres (446 ft) above sea level. The term Esan refers to both the people, their culture and their language.

Unlike some centralized kingdoms in Nigeria, the Esan people traditionally organized themselves into a loose confederation of 35 independent kingdoms, each governed by its own Onojie (king). This political system bears a striking resemblance to the Ancient Greek city-states (poleis), which, though sharing a common language and culture, operated as sovereign entities with their own rulers and governance structures.

The Esan are traditionally known to be agriculturalists, trado-medical practitioners, mercenary warriors and hunters. They cultivate palm trees, Irvingia gabonensis (erhonhiele), Cherry (Otien), bell pepper (akoh) coconut, betel nut, kola nut, black pear, avocado pear, yams, cocoyam, cassava, maize, fluted pumpkin, rice, beans, groundnut, bananas, oranges, plantains, sugar cane, tomato, potato, okra, pineapple, paw paw, and various vegetables.

== Origins ==
The origins of the Esan people are complex, involving multiple waves of migration spanning centuries. Historically, three major waves of migration contributed to the formation of Esanland as it is known today:

=== Autochthonous Esan Migration (Prehistoric Era – c. 500 AD) ===
Some oral traditions and historical research suggest that the earliest settlers in Esanland migrated from the Nok Cultural Zone, located in north-central Nigeria, around the Niger-Benue confluence. This region extends to the southwestern edge of the Jos Plateau and was inhabited as early as 1000 B.C.

These early Esan settlers moved southward and began colonizing the savannah-forest ecotone in present-day Esanland by around 500 AD, establishing early settlements called Iyala (mini-kingdoms).

=== The Return Migration from Igodomigodo (c. tenth century AD) ===
A second wave of migration occurred when Esan groups who had previously migrated southward to Igodomigodo (the early Benin Kingdom) returned to Esanland. Among these returnees were the three sons of Ogiso Owodo, the last ruler of the Ogiso dynasty of Igodomigodo. Their mother, Queen Oakha, is said to have led them back to Esanland, where they settled in Uromi, Uzea, and Ekperi before the 10th century.

These returnees integrated with the autochthonous Esan population, forming some of the major Esan kingdoms that still exist today.

=== Migration During the Oba Era (fourteenth century AD) ===
The third significant wave of migration occurred during the reign of Oba Ewuare I of Benin (c. 1440–1473). During this period, some Esan groups who had previously lived in Benin (Igodomigodo) migrated back to Esanland, escaping the centralization and expansionist policies of the Oba dynasty.

This migration led to the formal establishment of several Esan kingdoms, solidifying their political and cultural independence, they developed their own unique traditions, governance systems, and identity.

There are on the whole 35 established kingdoms in Esanland, including Amahor, Ebelle, Egoro, Ewohimi, Ekpoma, Ekpon, Emu, Ewu, Ewato, Ewosa, Idoa, Ifeku, Igueben, Ilushi, Inyelen, Irrua, Ogwa, Ohordua, Okalo, Okhuesan, Onogholo, Opoji, Oria, Orowa, Uromi, Udo, Ugbegun, Ugboha, Ubiaja, Urhohi, Ugun, Ujiogba, Ukhun, Urho and Uzea.

Esans kept a homogenous culture. However, these kingdoms were colonized by the British Empire during September 1897, only gaining independence 63 years later in 1960 when Nigeria became independent from British Colonial rule. After independence, the Esan people have suffered from civil war, poverty, and lack of infrastructure.

The Esan people primarily speak the Esan language, a language classified Niger- Congon languages related to Edo, Urhobo, Owan, Isoko, and Etsako languages. It is considered a regionally important language in Nigeria, and it is taught in primary schools in addition to being broadcast on radio and television. The Esan language is also recognized in the Census of the United Kingdom.

It is estimated that the Esan people who reside in Esanland number about one million to 1.5 million citizens Nigeria, and there is a strong Esan diaspora.

== Etymology and identity ==
There is no historical evidence to the origin of the term Esan. The term Esan has been applied to the Esan people for thousands of years, and was used before contact with Europeans. The popular believed by some historians that the name 'Esan' (originally, 'Ele= "Them" and 'san= "Jump") owes it meaning, to the acrobatic dance of the spirit called the "igbabornelimhin" the term Esan has been associated to this ethnic group before Oba dynasty in Edo. 'Ishan' is an Anglicized form of 'Esan', the result of colonial Britain's inability to properly pronounce the name of this ethnic group. It is believed that similar corruption has affected such Esan names as ubhẹkhẹ (now 'obeche' tree), uloko (now 'iroko' tree), Abhulimẹn (now 'Aburime'), etc. Efforts have however been made to return to status quo ante.

For academic purposes, Esan refers to:

1. The ethnic group that occupies central Edo State;
2. (plural unchanged) A person or the people collectively from this ethnic group;
3. The language of these people which, linguistically, is of the Kwa subdivision of the Niger-Congo language family;
4. Something of, related to, or having Esan origin e.g. uro Esan (=Esan language), otọ Esan (=Esan land), ọghẹdẹ Esan (=Esan banana).

In the pre-colonial era, Esans carried a crow's foot tribal scar below their eyes.

== History ==
=== Pre-historical/classical period ===
According to archaeological and linguistic evidence, humans have resided in the savannah-forest ecotone in Esanland for at least 3000 years ago.

From 500 AD to 750 AD, these hunter-gatherers started to colonize the savannah-forest ecosystem of Esanland and the forest ecosystem of the Benin Empire. They created a pre-Esan, pre-Edo society that built advanced structures such as moats and walls around family properties. These enclosures were, at maximum, three to five kilometres in diameter, and demarcated residential and agricultural property. Those properties enlarged to become villages, and by 800, these village coalesced to form kingdoms with hierarchies. Modern-day digs in the region have found that these walls were situated in the eastern Benin Empire and northern Esanland. Settlements were close to permanent springs on the northern plateau, but never next to intermittent springs. Esanland's culture, language and growth were majorly influenced by the mass exoduses to Esan territory from all adjacent polities Communities on Esanland's southern and eastern fringes (Ewohimi, Ewatto, Ekpon, Amahor) were heavily populated by Igbos and Igalas (into Uroh); from the north came the Emai into Ukhun, Idoa, and Amahor and the Etsako into Irrua; and from the south came the Itsekiri (into Ekpon) and Urhobo (into Ujiogba).

The biggest influence on Esanland came from Edo, founders of Benin Empire. In 1460, Oba Ewuare passed laws of mourning that prohibited sexual intercourse, bathing, drumming, dancing, and cooking. These laws proved too restrictive for many citizens, and these citizens fled the kingdom to Esanland. This exodus shaped Esanland's modern cultural identity.Oral tradition has heavily supported this theory. Prominent Esan and Edo historians have collected stories about this migration.

=== Pre-colonization ===
Esan kingdoms had its own autonomy but also cooperated with the Benin Empire. The Oba approved the enijie of Esanland. Yet, several wars between Esan kingdoms and Benin were recorded. This was due to the Oba, at ascension on the throne, sending white chalk to the Esans as a term of friendship. If the chalk was rejected, then the Oba would try to invade Esanland. The varying political stabilities of Benin and the Esan kingdoms also led to warfare. Such warfare was so common that there is no recorded history of peace between all of the Esan kingdoms and Benin.

Esanland was extensively involved in world trade.They produced cloth, ivory, peppers, and sold them to European merchants in Yorubaland, Esanland, and Afenmai.

During the 16th century, the Uzea War occurred. This war was between the Uromi Kingdom and the Benin Kingdom. The war lasted from 1502 to 1503, and resulted from a refusal of friendship from Oba Ozolua of Benin by Onojie Agba of Uromi. The war ended at the town of Uzea,were oba ozoluwa was beheaded and king agba of uromi also vanished into the dense forest due to his spiritual powers.He is however reminded today as "Esan God of war".However, in peaceful times Esan kingdoms would loan soldiers to the Benin Kingdom, such as during the Idah War of 1515–1516, and the sacking of Akure in 1823.

During the nineteenth century, northern Esanland was continually attacked and sacked by the Muslim Nupe people in the hunt for slaves and converts to Islam, having previously taken over the Afenmai peoples' lands. Many Esan kingdoms from the south helped in the battle to fend off the Nupes. The battles came into the Esans' favour; and the Nupe armies were defeated and several captives of Nupe and Etsako warriors were brought into Esan cities where their descendants live today. The nineteenth century brought increasing influence of Europe on Esanland, as the English demanded palm-products.

=== Esan warfare and colonization ===
Prince Okojie and his entourage

In 1897, the British launched the Benin Expedition of 1897, which left the Esan independent from the Kingdom of Benin. In 1899, the British led an invasion into the Esan kingdoms that lasted for seven years. Esanland proved to be harder to conquer than the Benin Kingdom because of its strong autonomy: Kingdoms chose to keep fighting the British even if its neighbours capitulated. Defeated Benin chiefs like Ologbosere and Ebohon were still resistant to British rule inadvertently guarded Esan soil from the west, by establishing military outposts and blocking roads. This lasted from 1897 to 22 April 1899, where Ologbosere surrendered at the border village of Okemue.

The first kingdom to be attacked by the British was the Kingdom of Ekpon. Ekpon launched a fierce resistance against the British invasion on 22 April, leading to months of skirmishes. After the initial British invasion into the Kingdom of Ekpon, the kingdom became bogged down, the kingdom of Ekpon led an ambush of the British camp at Okueme, on 29 April. This led British forces to retreat, consolidate their power, and defeat and kill Ologbosere in May. Subsequent attempts by the British failed as well: conquests into Irrua, for example, led to an adoption of a guerrilla warfare strategy followed by a retreat; this method was so successful that other Esan kingdoms adopted it and the British did not invade Esanland until 1901.

On 16 March 1901, the Kingdom of Uromi, headed by the old, yet intelligent Onojie Okolo, was attacked by the British. The Uromi response, led by Prince Okojie, was swift and employed guerrilla warfare. After a short time, British forces captured the village of Amedokhian, where Okolo was stationed, and killed him. This angered Prince Okojie so much that he killed the Captain of the British troops before reinforcements were brought in. The British then realized that Uromi was nigh impenetrable without native help, and contact local sympathizers such as Onokpogua, the Ezomo of Uromi. This succeeded in kidnapping Prince Okojie out of the forest and sending him to the British offices at Calabar.

This process was duplicated in most of the kingdoms that fought with Britain; guerrilla warfare was excessively used by the Esans, resulting in prolonged battle time in spite of inferior weapons, and reinforcements from Benin City for the British. Even when villages were captured, internal resistance was fierce; continued guerrilla warfare in Uromi forced the British to release Prince Okojie. The British responded by razing several villages they had captured. Finally, in 1906, Esanland submitted to British rule, and the thirty-four kingdoms became the Ishan Division in the British colony of Nigeria.

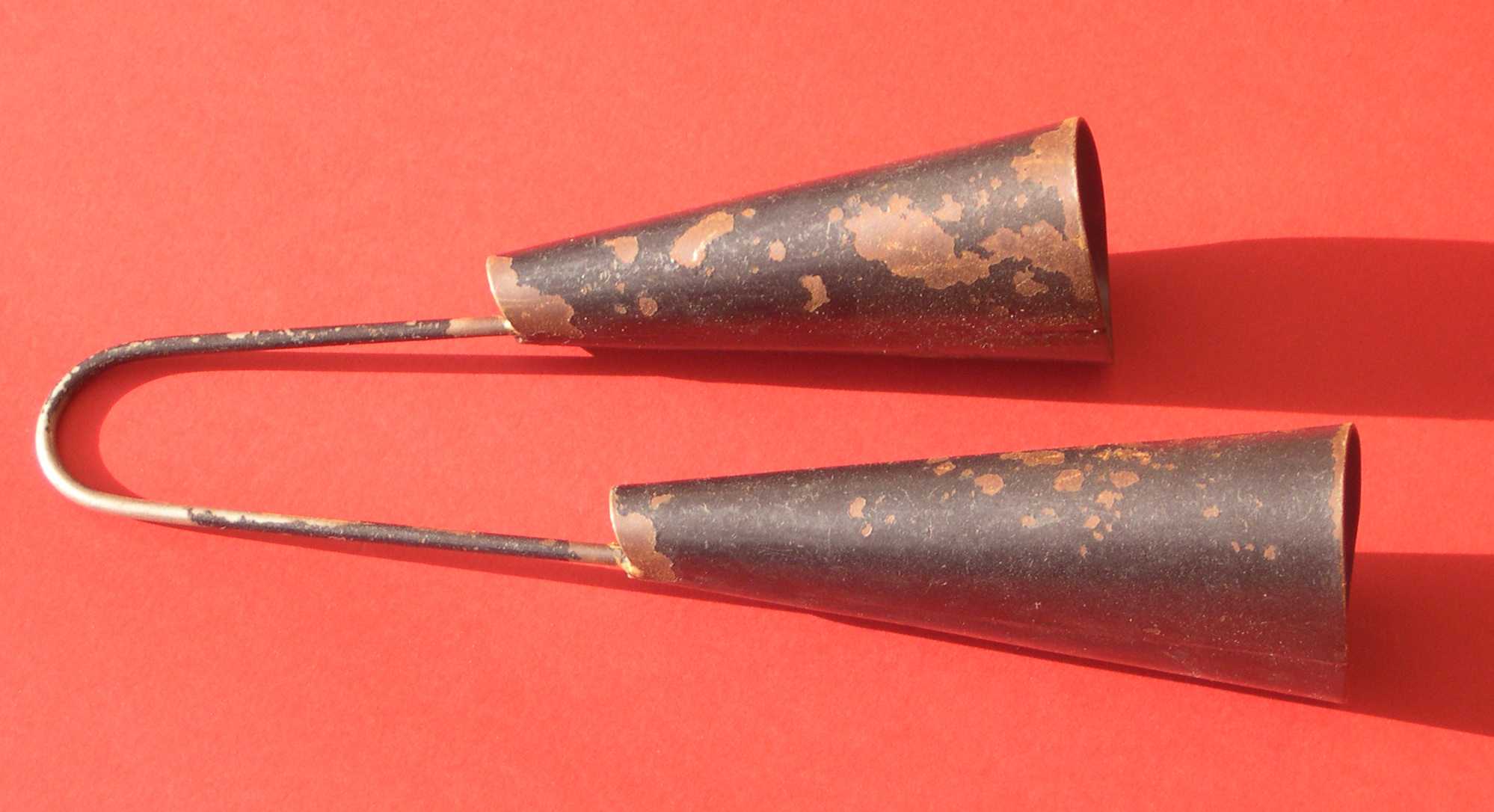
The traditional agogo bell. The agogo is a very important instrument in Esanland. It is used to help keep of the rhythm of the region's various dances, and the translation of hour in Esan is agogo.

=== Civil war ===
During the Nigerian Civil War, Esanland became a battleground following the Biafran invasion of the Midwest on 9 August 1967. Initially, many Esan people held a neutral stance or even sympathised with Biafra; this sentiment was largely due to widespread outrage at the 1966 anti-Igbo pogroms in the north, which also impacted Esan and other southern ethnic communities. However, the invasion and occupation quickly changed public perceptions of the Biafran cause across the Mid-West. In seeking to consolidate control over the region, Biafran forces imposed curfews, set up roadblocks, and carried out extrajudicial killings. Many Esan civilians — particularly social and political leaders — were executed on suspected association with the federal government while mentally ill individuals were also targeted for killing, as Biafran soldiers believed they could be enemy spies. In areas like Ewohimi, Uromi, and Ubiaja, Biafran troops carried out mass executions including the killings of detained civilians. By the end of September 1967, the federal counteroffensive regained control of Esanland, although federal soldiers also targeted Esan civilians suspected of supporting Biafra.

The invasion ultimately alienated many Esan people from the Biafran cause, reinforcing support for the federal government. The conflict left lasting memories of occupation on the Esan community, with mass graves and accounts of civilian executions serving as continued reminders of the war.

=== Performing arts/music ===
Esan dance is dominated by the Igbabonelimhin, an acrobatic dance performed mostly by young males. Igbabonelimhin involves spinning and somersaulting to a timed beat. The mode of operation varies amongst Esan villages. This slight clash can be seen on fixed days for performances. Under normal circumstances, Igbabonelimhin is performed every two weeks of the Esan calendar and on the market days of the various villages and towns that make up Esan. Igbabonelimhin could be danced annually to mark end of year celebrations, new yam festivals and organized social functions, like burial ceremonies. Today, the dance is taken as a unique symbol for Esans everywhere.

== Notable Esans in Nigeria ==
- Augustus Aikhomu, Navy Admiral and former military Vice-President of Nigeria
- Ambrose Folorunsho Alli, professor of medicine, Governor of Bendel State and the founder of Bendel State University, later posthumously renamed Ambrose Alli University
- Anthony Anenih, police officer, politician, former Chairman Social Democratic Party, former PDP Board of Trustees Chairman, and former Minister of Works and Housing
- Christy Ogbah, Musician and former police officer in the Nigeria Police Force.
- Ehizibue Kingsley, footballer.
- Odion Ighalo footballer.
- Victor Ehikhamenor, artist, writer, and photographer.
- Anthony Enahoro, journalist, politician, former Federal Commissioner, former Chairman NADECO, raised the motion for the independence of Nigeria in 1953 at the age of 30
- Peter Enahoro, journalist, writer, columnist, and author of the book, How to Be a Nigerian.
- Tom Ikimi, architect, politician, former chairman, National Republican Convention and former Minister of Foreign Affairs
- Charles Inojie, Actor, Writer
- Festus Iyayi, writer
- Stella Obasanjo, the First Lady of Nigeria from 1999 until her death
- Anthony Olubunmi Okogie, Cardinal and former Archbishop of Lagos
- Julius Okojie, former executive secretary, National Universities Commission
- Sonny Okosun, musician
- Victor Osimhen, footballer
- Chris Oyakhilome, evangelist and president of Christ Embassy
- Fidelis Oyakhilome, former Lagos State Police Commissioner and former Governor of Rivers State
- Amb. (Dr.) Martin Ihoeghian Uhomoibhi, former President of the United Nations Human Rights Council
- Godly Showpromoter, the pioneer of Obito highlife music and band in Esan.

== Religion and folklore ==
Esan folktales and folklore, like the igbabonẹlimhin and akhuẹ, serve as forms of learning and entertainment. The Esan have prominent traditional rulers who keep order in a society where beauty and manners are intertwined. Despite the long-term impact of Christianity, the Esan are largely traditional and a large number practice traditional beliefs in the form of worship of ancestral spirits and other gods. A large percentage of Esan are Christians, mostly Catholic and recently of other denominations. Esan has various dialects all of which stem from Bini and there is still close affinity between the Esan and the Benin people, which led to the common saying "Esan ii gbi Ẹdo" meaning, Esan does not harm the Ẹdo (i.e. Bini). There have been other translation of that saying, Esan gbe Edo which means Esan have conquered Bini.

Traditional Esan religion has many similarities to traditional Edo religion, due to the Esan migration to the northeast during the 15th century from the Benin Empire. There are many deities of the Esan religion:

- Osanobua, the main Edo-Esan god. This name for God was brought over to Christianity and its missionaries, and thus the translation for God in Esanland is Osanobua.
- Olokun
- Èṣù, wrongly categorized as the Esan trickster god. This god is shared with Yoruba and Edo myth. The name Èṣù was used as a translation for Satan by Christian missionaries. This is also very incorrect and false. Èṣù is not Satan or Devil.
- Osun, the Esan god of medicine. This is where the surname Okosun, or son of medicine, originated from.

== Esan Local Government Areas in Edo State ==
The autonomous clans/kingdoms in Esan land are currently administratively arranged as follows under the current five local government areas:

1. Esan-North-East LGA, Uromi: Uromi and Uzea
2. Esan Central LGA, Irrua: Irrua, Ugbegun, Opoji, Ewu, Ebudin
3. Esan West LGA, Ekpoma: Ekpoma, Iruekpen, Ihumudumu, Idumebo, Illeh, Idoa, Ogwa, Urohi, Ukhun, Egoro and Ujiogba
4. Esan South East LGA, Ubiaja:, Ubiaja, Ewohimi, Emu, Ohordua, Ẹwatto, Okhuesan, Orowa, Ugboha, Oria, Illushi, Onogholo, Inyenlen
5. Igueben LGA, Igueben: Igueben, Ebelle, Amaho, Ẹwossa, Udo, Ekpon, Ugun, Okalo,

== See also ==
- Esan language
- Ibore, an ancient city

== Sources ==
- Siollun, Max (2009). Oil, Politics and Violence: Nigeria's Military Coup Culture (1966-1976). New York: Algora Publishing. ISBN 978-0-87586-710-6.
