= Esan language =

Edoid language spoken in Nigeria

Esan
- Ishan
- Native to: Nigeria
- Ethnicity: Esan people
- Native speakers: 3,000,000 (2025)
- Language family: Niger–Congo?: Atlantic–Congo; Volta–Niger; yeai; Edoid; North Central; Edo–Esan–Ora; Esan

Language codes
- ISO 639-3: ish
- Glottolog: esan1238

Esan is a language in Nigeria. Dictionaries and grammar texts of the Esan language are being produced. There are many dialects, including Ogwa, Ẹkpoma (Ekuma), Ebhossa (okhuesan)

(Ewossa), Ewohimi, Ewu, Ewatto, Ebelle, Igueben, Irrua, Ohordua, Uromi, Uzea, Ubiaja and Ugboha.

== Dialects ==
List of Esan dialects as classified by Osiruemu (2010):

Official name	Esan name	Speech areas/Villages	Local Government Areas
Ekpoma Iruekpen	Ekuma Iruekpen	Akahia, Ayetoro, Egoro, Amede, Eguare, Egoro Eko, Oikhena, Idoa, Igor, Illeh, Izogen, Uhiele, Ujeme, Ukpenu, Urohi, idumebo, ihumudumu	Esan West
Ewatto	Ebhoato	Okhuesan, Emu, Okhuedua	Esan South East
Igueben	Igueben	Ebele, Uzebu, Uhe, Ebhosa, Ekpon	Igueben
Ilushi	Ilushi	Oria, Onogholo, Uzea, Ugboha	Esan South East
Irrua	Uruwa	Egua Ojirua, Atwagbo, Isugbenu, Usenu, Uwesan, Ugbohare, Ibori, Edenu, Ibhiolulu, Opoji	Esan Central
Ogwa Ujogba	Ogua Ugiogba	Ujogba, Amahor, Ugun	Esan West
Ohordua	Okhuedua	Ohordua, Ewohimi	Esan South East
Ubiaja	Ubiaza	Eguare, Kpaja, Udakpa	Esan South East
Udo	Udo	Udo, Ekpon, Ekekhen	Igueben
Ugbegun	Ugbegun	Ugbegun, Ugbegun Ebodin, Ekekhen, Ewossa, Ujabhole, Ugbelor	Esan Central
Ugboha	Owaha	Emu, Oria, Ilushi	Esan South East
Uromi	Urhomwun	Uzea, Obeidun, Ivue, Ibhiolulu, Awo, Amendokhen, Ebulen, Ekomado, Uwesan	Esan North East

== Usage ==
People from Uromi, Irrua and Ewu speak slightly different Esan dialect compared to people from Uzea, even though there is documentation that Uromi people and the Uzea people have common ancestry. Such variations in tongue and spelling of words are common in the Esan language. Most annual Esan Kings' Council meetings are largely conducted in English for this reason. However, the Esan language has been described as regionally important. It is taught in schools throughout Esanland, and Esan language radio and television is prevalent.

== Common names ==
Linguistic finding has shown the word ‘gbe’ to have the highest number of usages in Esan, with up to 76 different meanings in a normal dictionary. Names starting with the prefixes Ọsẹ; Ẹhi, Ẹhiz or Ẹhis; and Okoh (for male), Okhuo (for female) are the commonest in Esan: Ehizefe, Ẹhizọkhae, Ẹhizojie, Ẹhinọmẹn, Ẹhimanre, Ẹhizẹle, Ẹhimẹn, Ẹhikhayimẹntor, Ẹhikhayimẹnle, Ẹhijantor, Ehicheoya, Emiator etc.; Ọsẹmundiamẹn, Ọsẹmhẹngbe, etc.; Okosun, Okojie, Okodugha, Okoemu, Okouromi, Okoukoni, Okougbo, Okoepkẹn, Okoror, Okouruwa, Oriaifo etc. To any Oko-, 'Ọm-' the suffix of the name can be added to arrive of the female version e.g. Ọmosun, Ọmuromi, etc.

== Phonology ==
=== Consonants ===
	Bilabial	Labio- dental	Alveolar	Post-alv./ Palatal	Velar	Labio- velar	Glottal
Nasal	m		n	ɲ			
Plosive	p b		t d		k ɡ	k͡p ɡ͡b	
Affricate				t͡ʃ d͡ʒ			
Fricative	β	f v	s z	ʃ	x ɣ		h
Rhotic			r				
Approximant			l	j		w	

=== Vowels ===
	Front	Central	Back
Close	i ĩ		u ũ
Close-mid	e		o
Open-mid	ɛ ɛ̃		ɔ ɔ̃
Open		a ã	

== Alphabet ==
Esan uses several alphabets, Romanized Esan being the most commonly used with a total number of 25 letters:

a, b, d, e, ẹ, f, g, h, i, j, k, l, m, n, o, ọ, p, r, s, t, u, v, w, y, z.

The digraph consists of 10 sets of double letters:

bh, gb, gh, kh, kp, kw (rarely used), mh, nw, ny, sh.

== Grammar ==
=== Nouns ===
All Esan nouns begin with vowel letters (i.e. a, e, ẹ, i, o, ọ, u): aru, eko, ẹbho, itohan, ozẹ, ọrhia, uze, etc. Due to the influence of neighboring tongues and Western languages, especially English, there is the tendency among Esan to pronounce many non-Esan nouns beginning with a consonant letter. In the event of such within the boundary of Esan write-up, an apostrophe may be employed before the first consonant letter both to Esanize and ease the pronunciation. In speech however such apostrophe is often pronounced as ‘i’ /i:/: ’bazaar, ’Jonah, ’labour, ’zoo, etc.

Each Esan noun ends in either a vowel letter (e.g. ato, Ẹkpoma, uri, oya) or the vowel-associated letter ‘n’: agbọn, eran, ẹnyẹn, itọn, isẹn, etc. Exception to this rule is the writing of proper nouns where a name can end in letter ‘r’ always after a letter ‘ọ’ to make it sound like ‘or’ in English as well as the use of letter ‘h’ after a letter ‘o’ to make it sound as ‘oh’ in English: Isibor, Oko'ror, Okoh, Okoọboh, etc.

In nouns, following the first vowel letter is always a second consonant letter: ahoho, avan, ilo, udia. For the expression of a feminine gender, the second consonant letter following a vowel letter is doubled: ahhihi (=female ant), ọsshọ (=female friend), ọrrhia (=female person), etc. This gender-sensitive style is better understood by French speakers, who usually differentiate genders – masculine, feminine, neuter. Exception to this rule has to do with certain nouns that consist of vowel letters only e.g. 'oẹ' (leg, plural 'ae'), 'oo' (mother), 'uu' (death), etc.

Pluralization in Esan is of two forms, the first of which has to do with nouns that have original plural forms, in which case the first letter is replaced/displaced by another letter:

ọmọn (baby), imọn (babies); ọmọle (man, male), imọle (men, males); okpea (man), ikpea (men); okhuo (woman, female), ikhuo (women, females); ọshọ, ọmuọe (friend), ishọ, imuọe (friends); obhio (relation), ibhio (relations); obhokhan (child), ibhokhan (children); oghian (enemy), ighian (enemies); usẹnbhokhan (boy), isẹnbhokhan (boys); ọmamhẹn, ọmọhin (girl), imamhẹn, imọhin (girls); ọwanlẹn (elder, adult), iwanlẹn (elders, adults); ọrhia (person), erhia (persons); ọbo (doctor), ebo (doctors); Ebo (English citizen), Ibo (English citizens); obọ (arm), abọ (arms); oẹ (leg), ae (legs); use (nail), ise (nails); udo (stone), ido (stones)

The second has to do, not with the above which have original plural form, but with many other nouns which do not. In this case, a suffix (as the use of 's' in English) is used by adding it to the noun in question, but without a change in pronunciation. For example:

uwaebe (school), uwaebeh (schools); eran (stick), eranh (sticks); emhin (something), emhinh (some things)

=== Pronouns ===
All Esan pronouns have plural forms different from singular, but both subject and object cases do not differ (both subject and object cases are the same):

Singular	Plural
imẹn (I, me)	iman (we, us)
uwẹ (you)	ibha (you, or Pidgin English ‘una’)
ọle (he, him)	ele (they, them)
ọlle (she, her)	elle (they, them)
ọhle (it)	ehle (they, them)
no English equivalent:
–	Aah^{a}
otuan [preceding human figure]	ituan [preceding human figures]^{b}
ukpọle^{c}	ikpọle^{c}

^a‘Aah’ can only be used as subject. (‘otuan’ and ‘ukpọle’ can be used in both ways: Otuan ọkpa ni ele dia; Dati ituan eva re. Ukpọle ọkpa ribhọ. Jia ikpọle ea re.)

^bSuch as ancestors

^c‘otuan’ (pl. ituan) is used for humans, ‘ukpọle’ (pl. ikpọle) is used for non-humans and ‘Aah’ depends on the context in which it is used.

=== Sentence order ===
The use of Esan is open to three orders or arrangements: (subject–verb–object (SVO), object–subject–verb (OSV), and object–verb–subject (OVS)) to express themselves Okoh ’h gbi ele (SVO). Okoh imẹn ddaghe (OSV). Ena yẹ imẹn (OVS). SVO is commonest and most employed. The use of OVS is restricted to a limited number of grammatical constructions.

=== Verbs ===
All Esan verbs start with consonant letters and end in either vowel letter or the vowel associated letter ‘n’: bi, dẹ, fan, hẹn, lolo, etc. In expressing the past, doubling of initial letter of a verb takes place such that ‘bi’ changes to ‘bbi’ and ‘hẹn’ becomes ‘hhẹn’. A verb can also begin with a diphthong: khian, gbe, bhanbhan. The formation of past tense in this case is not different: kkhian, ggbe, etc. Some Esan dialect such as Uzea makes use of ‘ah’ (or ’h) to show present participle (as in “He is going home.”). Although this is absent in majority of Esan dialects, it is used and placed before the main verb when writing: Ele ’h khọa = They’re having bath.

=== Adjectives ===
An Esan adjective, as does an English adjective, modifies a noun or pronoun. That is, it gives more information about a noun or pronoun and makes its meaning more specific. It can appear before or after a noun. The only difference between Esan and English adjectives is that like Japanese, some Esan adjectives are verb-like in that they inflect to show tenses: Ele mhẹnmhin. = They are good. // Ele mmhẹnmhin. = They were good. The doubling of the initial letter of the adjective 'mhẹnmhin (good)' like verbs, clearly demonstrates this point. Esan adjectives are of two distinct types: ‘word adjective’ and ‘phrasal adjective’.

==== Word adjective ====
A word adjective is an adjective consisting of a single word: esi, khọlọ, hu, jian, etc. This form of adjective is subdivided into five types: pre-noun adjective, post-noun adjective, numeral adjective, nounal adjective, and restricted adjective. A pre-noun adjective appears only before the noun it modifies, provides information about the noun's size and/or quantity, and they start with a vowel letter: ukpomin, ekitui, udede, ikwẹkwi, etc. These adjectives are not subject to the law of tenses and do not take the suffix ‘mhin’. A post-noun adjective comes immediately after the noun it modifies: khọlọ, khọriọn, fuọ, ba, to, han, lẹnlẹn, bhihi, hu, khisin, khere, re(le) (far), re (deep), re (grown up), re (well attended), bue, tan, etc. These adjectives are subject to the law of tenses such that they are used to reflect time (e.g. “Okoh rẹ kkhọriọn.” = "Okoh is ugly.").

Except the adjective ‘khọriọn’, all others can be used with the suffix ‘mhin’, and (‘ebe’ and ‘esi’ which are also called noun adjectives) they all start with consonant letters. A numeral adjective is one that can be used to answer such question as “how many?”: ọkpa, eva, ea, igbe, etc. Because they are also nouns, they all start with vowel letters. They are neither subject to the law of tenses nor can they be used with the suffix ‘mhin’. A nounal or noun adjective is one that comes before a noun and can easily be manipulated to become a noun in usage: esi, ebe. It can neither be used with ‘mhin’ nor are they subject to tense law. A restricted adjective is one that can only be used with a particular noun e.g. ‘bhibhi’ in 'ewewẹ bhibhi' (early morning).

Some adjectives that can be placed under the word adjective are adjectives that are formed from the doubling of a word adjective: fanọn-fanọn (unkempt; untidy), rughu-rughu or ragha-ragha (disorderly), sankan-sankan (muddy and rough), yagha-yagha (untidy), kpadi-kpadi (rough or even), ose-ose (beautiful). This system can also be used thus: fanọn/2, yagha/2, kpadi/2, sankan/2, ose/2, etc.

==== Phrasal adjective ====
A phrasal adjective is one that consists of more than one word; it is made up of a phrase. More often than not, an adjectival phrase usually contains either a noun + verb or an adjective+preposition+noun which combine to perform the work of an adjective. Some common examples are: rui ẹlo (blind), yi ehọ (deaf, rebellious), di ọmalẹn (old, senile), di itọn a (wretched), bhọn ose (beautiful), fi ahiẹ a (serene), fua amẹn (light-complexioned), ba bhi egbe (painful), mhẹn bhi egbe (body-friendly), mhẹn bhi unu (sweet), mhẹn bhi ẹlo (beautiful or not offensive to sight), mhẹn bhi ihue (not offensive to the nose), mhẹn bhi ehọ (not offensive to the ear), khọ bhi unu (unpalatable; offensive), khọ bhi egbe (unbearable), etc.

Below are some Esan adjectives and their meanings (and those that can be used with the suffix ‘mhin’ are shown. The addition of the suffix 'mhin' to a word turns it from adjective to noun just as the suffix 'ness' in English does.) Ukpomin (little), ekitui (many; much), udede (big), ikwẹkwi (tiny; trivial), khisin-mhin (small; diminutive), khere-mhin (small; little), hu-mhin (big; foamy), khuẹlẹ-mhin (slim), re-mhin (far; deep; well attended; grown up), dia-mhin (straight; appropriate), bhala-mhin (light-complexioned), bhia-mhin (large, spacious), riẹriẹ-mhin (smooth), rẹrẹ-mhin (restless), kpoloa (smooth), gọ-mhin (crooked) kpono-mhin (slippery), kwọn (slippery; slimy), to-mhin (irritating), kpọ-mhin (widespread), khia-mhin (holy, righteous), fu-mhin (peaceful), bhiẹlẹ-mhin (lazy), fa-mhin (dirt-free, clean), lẹ-mhin (scarce), tua-mhin (quick), zaza-mhin (skilful), sun-mhin (slimy), kholo (spherical), hian-mhin (efficacious; alcoholic), nwun-mhin or mun-mhin (sharp; alcoholic), khọlọ-mhin (bad; painful), sẹ-ẹ (ordinary), nọghọ-mhin (difficult), kpataki (real), lo-mhin (inexpensive; deep), khua-mhin (heavy; hot), tọnọ-mhin (itchy), luẹn (ripe), khekhea (sour), riala-mhin (bitter), fua-mhin (white), bhihi-mhin (black; dark-complexioned), kẹnkẹn-mhin (multicoloured), kọnkọn (fat), kaka-mhin (hard; serious), toto-mhin (serious; taut), ghan-mhin (costly), ghantoa (costly), wualan-mhin (wise), sọnọ-mhin (offensive), lẹkhẹ-mhin (soft), khẹrẹ-khẹrẹ (muddy), gban-a (expansive), tan-mhin (tall; elegant), guẹguẹ (ingratiating), mhẹn-mhin (good), lẹnlẹn-mhin (sweet), zeze-mhin (strong), wo-mhin (powerful; mature), bie (cooked or done), fe-mhin (wealthy); fanọn-fanọn (unkempt; untidy), rughu-rughu or ragha-ragha (disorderly), sankan-sankan (muddy and rough), yagha-yagha (untidy); rui ẹlo (blind), yi ehọ (deaf, rebellious), di ọmalẹn (old, senile), di itọn a (wretched), bhọn ose (beautiful), fi ahiẹ a (serene), fua amẹn (light-complexioned), ba bhi egbe (painful), mhẹn bhi egbe (body-friendly), mhẹn bhi unu (sweet), mhẹn bhi ẹlo (beautiful or not offensive to sight), mhẹn bhi ihue (not offensive to the nose), mhẹn bhi ehọ (not offensive to the ear), khọ bhi unu (unpalatable; offensive), khọ bhi egbe (unbearable), etc.

=== Determiners ===
- ‘ọni’ in Esan is equivalent to ‘the’ (as singular) in English: ọni emhin = the thing
- ‘eni’ in Esan is equivalent to ‘the’ (as plural) in English: eni emhinh = the things
- ‘ni’ in Esan is equivalent to ‘that’ in English: emhin ni or ọni emhin ni
- ‘na’ in Esan is equivalent to ‘this’ in English: emhin na or ọni emhin na
- In the determiner phrases below, the determiners are in boldface:
- ‘ukpi’ (pl. ‘ikpi’) in Esan is equivalent to the indefinite article ‘a’/‘an’ in English:
- ukpi ẹmhin = a thing
- ikpi emhinh = ... things
- ‘ọsoso’ (pl. ‘esoso’) in Esan is equivalent to ‘any’ in English:
- emhin ọsoso = any thing
- emhinh esoso any things
- ‘eso’ /ayso/ in Esan is equivalent to ‘some’ in English:
- emhinh eso = some things
- ‘ikpeta’ in Esan is equivalent to ‘few’ in English:
- ikpeta emhinh = few things
- ‘nekirẹla’ in Esan is equivalent to ‘whoever’/‘whichever’ in English:
- emhin nekirẹla = whatever thing
- ‘erebhe’ in Esan is equivalent to ‘all’ in English:
- emhin erebhe = all things
- ‘eveva’ in Esan is equivalent to ‘both’ in English:
- Emhinh eveva = both things
- ‘ekitui’ in Esan is equivalent to ‘many’ in English:
- ekitui emhinh = many things
