= Joe Edionwele =

Nigerian politician

Joseph Eghoghon Edionwele

Hon Member of the House of Representatives of Nigeria from Edo State
- In office 27 May 2015 – 12 June 2023
- Preceded by: Patrick A. Ikhariale
- Succeeded by: Felix Ehiguese Akhabue
- Constituency: Esan Central/Esan West/Igueben Federal Constituency
- Succeeded by: Marcus Onobun

Chairman, Esan West LGA, 1999-2007 Edo State
- In office 2019 – June 2023

Personal details
- Born: 31 January 1960 (age 66) Iruekpen, Edo State
- Party: People's Democratic Party (Nigeria), PDP
- Parent(s): Mr. and Mrs. Pa. Edionwele
- Education: HND Accounting
- Alma mater: Auchi Polytechnic
- Website: https://www.nassnig.org/

Joseph Eghonghon Edionwele is a politician and member of the 8th and 9th Assembly representing Esan Central, Esan West, and Igueben Federal Constituency, of Edo State. He is popularly known as Joe Edionwele.

== Early life and education ==
Edionwele was born on 31 January 1960 in Iruekpen, Esan West Local Government Area of Edo State, Nigeria. He was born to the family of Late Pa. Edionwele of Idumun-ogo Iruekpen, Ekpoma, Esan West Local Government Area, Edo State, Nigeria. Hon. Edionwele attended St. Paul Anglican Primary School Iruekpen (1966 – 1972), Ujoelen Grammar School, Ekpoma, from 1973 – 1978. He proceeded to Auchi Federal Polytechnic, Auchi, where he obtained Higher National Diploma (HND) in Accounting, in 1985.

== Career ==
Edionwele briefly worked as a teaching assistant at Ujoelen Grammar School after his secondary education before proceeding to further his education. After graduation, he was posted to Abia State for his mandatory National Youth Service in 1985/1986.

Upon completion of his national youth service, he worked with Union Bank of Nigeria before gaining employment to work with Nigeria Institute for Oil Palm Research (NIFOR), Edo State. At NIFOR, he rose to the position of a chief accountant before resigning to pursue his political career.

== Politics ==
In 1999, Edionwele contested and won the election for the position of a Local Government Chairman of Esan West Local Government under the platform of the People's Democratic Party (PDP) (1999 – 2002). Subsequently, in 2003, he was appointed a member of the Edo State Local Government Service Commission. He served in various capacities: a member of the Board of the National Orthopedic Hospital, Enugu and the Secretary of South-South People's Democratic Party, PDP.

In 2015 Hon. Edionwele contested for the position of House of Representatives member and won, he was returned to the National Assembly in 2019 General Election under the platform of the Peoples Democratic Party, PDP He was succeeded by Felix Ehiguese Akhabue.

== Personal life ==
Edionwele is married to Chief (Mrs.) Patricia Edionwele. They have several children.
