= Ewu =

Town in Edo State, Nigeria

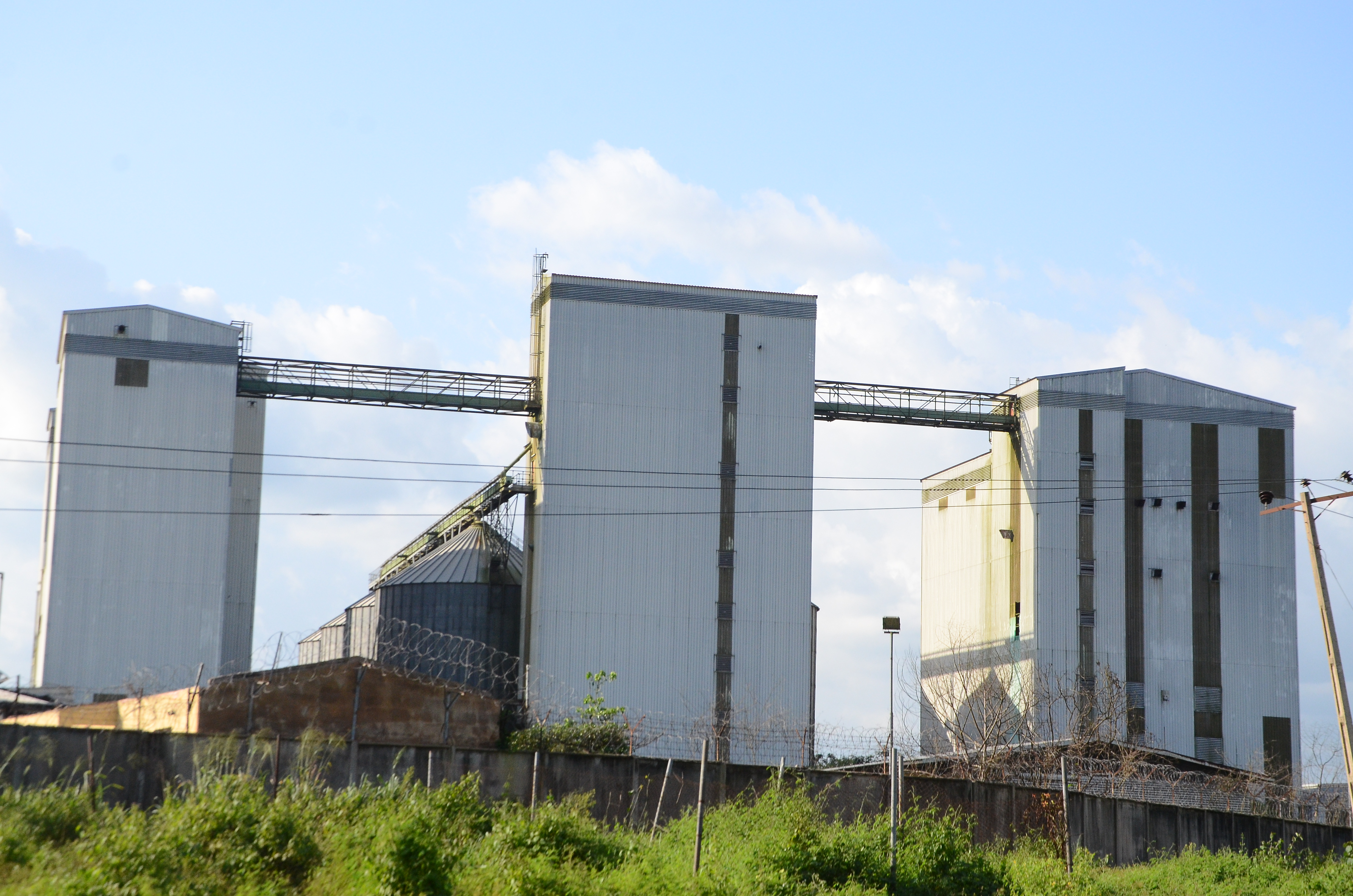
Ewu Flour Mill Building

Ewu is a Nigerian town situated in Esan Central Local Government Area in the Edo State of Nigeria. The city, an Esan tribe, lies on 200 feet in the plateau region of central Edo State, 100 kilometres north of Benin City, the capital of Edo State, Nigeria.

Ewu city comprises the communities of Eguare-Ewu, Ehanlen-Ewu, Ihenwen-Ewu, Uzogholo-Ewu, Ukhiodo-Ewu, Idunwele-Ewu, Eko-Ojeme, Oghodogbor, and Ukpeko Ori. Ewu is bounded in the north by Agbede, in the south-east by Irrua, in the south-west by Ekpoma.

== History and governance ==
The Ewu-born playwright, historian and poet Saintmoses Eromosele described Ewu as 'The Holy City of Commerce, Industry and Hospitality' in his book, The History and Chronicle of Ewu Monarchy: Since 1440. The monarchy of Ewu is believed to have been organized by Oba Ewuare, at about 1460 (Common Era) and was associated with Bini princes and warriors who made it their garrison in their quest to subjugate cotton and fabrics producing Esan tribes, especially the once powerful Uzea kingdom. Prior to the coming of Oba Ewuare in the mid 15th century, the Ewu community was organized and governed by an ancient gerontocracy where a council of the oldest people called Edion administered the various communities that constituted Ewu, independently. But Oba Ewuare of imperial Benin Kingdom overturned the gerontocratic system of administration he met in his conquest of Esan land and enthroned some of his princes as viceroys in its place, and a Benin general Ozaine (a tradition renders his name as "Oza") became a viceroy of the Oba in Ewu and thus first Onojie of Ewu kingdom. These princes of Benin Empire checked the frequent rebellion and insubordination of the ancient, once powerful Uzea kingdom in Esanland, and co-opted the Esan kingdoms into the then fast-expanding Benin Empire.

Notwithstanding the origin of the Benin Empire occupation of Ewu in about 1460, Ewu people have various accounts of oral tradition which trace their pre-Benin-Empire-occupation existence to time immemorial. In all the accounts of origin, it is generally accepted that the people of Ehanlen were the aboriginals in the ancient land of Ewu. It is also believed that the people of Idunwele were migrant farm settlers and hunters from Emaudo in Ekpoma. It is believed that the people from Benin Kingdom were settled at Ihenmwen and Ukhiodo, especially among the families that occupy the area of Ewu known as Idumu-igun quarters. The people are believed to have originated from Igun in Benin City. It is also traditionally believed, especially among the Aru Ose worshippers, that Ewu was indeed the original home and tap root, Eilu, of the Esan race being the ancient custodian of the Edion River (now in Agbede) and the Ihiala (ancient moat dug around Ewu).

The Ewu kingdom is currently ruled by the Ojeifo dynasty, which traces its roots via Ekpebua to Ozaine, the first Onoje of Ewu, who was a viceroy of the Oba Ewuare of Benin. The aboriginal peoples of Ewu are the Ehanlen people. Other settlers came from Igun and Ugbekun Quarters of Benin kingdom during the occupation of Ewu by the Benin imperialists. These settlers settled at Ihenwen at the quarters known as Idumigun. Later nomads and emigrants came from Emaudo in Ekpoma and settled in the areas known as Idunwele and Eko. Other waves of Benin emigrants fled from the tyranny of Oba Ewuare to Ewu and settled at Uzogholo, Idunwele and Ehanlen.

== Religion ==
Ewu has three major religions: Ebor; Islam; and Christianity. Islam was introduced in the early 20th century in 1908 through Onojie Omosun. Ewu is home to the Ewu Saint Benedict Monastery, a monastery of the Roman Catholic Church. It is also home to an advanced theological seminary owned by the Assemblies of God Church, Nigeria, known as the Nigerian Advanced School of Theology (NAST).

== People in Ewu ==
- Fidelis Oyakhilomen, retired Deputy Inspector General of Police, Nigeria, former military Governor of Rivers State and former chairman, Nigeria Drug Law Enforcement Agency (NDLEA).
- David Iyoha, Speaker of the Edo State House of Assembly.
- Saintmoses Eromosele, author of The History and Chronicle of Ewu Monarchy: Since 1440, international poet and novelist who wrote his blockbuster first novel, "The Winds of Life" at the age of sixteen and while still in secondary school. .
- Benard E. Aigbokhan, a professor of economics, President of Nigerian Economics Society and Vice Chancellor of Samuel Adegboyega University, Ogwa between 2013 and 2020.

== Festival ==
Ewu plays host to the annual Ighele festival, which is celebrated annually in Ewu in the month of June. The festival is important to the Ewu people and the inhabitant of Ewu because of the belief that Ighele brings peace and prosperity.
