= Ugbokhare =

Village in Nigeria

Ugbokhare is a village located in the northern part of Esan central local government, Irrua in Edo State, Nigeria with its political zone in ward four. Ugbokhare is about 20 to 30 minutes from the local government headquarters by car. Ugbokhare is surrounded by the villages of Udowo, Ewu, Ivue and Ibore.

== History ==
According to history the origin of the Ugbokhare. It is not possible in any circumstance for people to migrate from Otuo to farm in Ugbokhare Irrua. Ugbokhare people came from villages, perhaps neighbouring villages as farm settlers. Hence the name Ugbo a re re ( It was farming we came for). The names of the villages have not been historically proven. The neighboring village, Ibore came from Otuo, This has been histo-culturally proven. The first settlers in Ugbokhare are known as Ikpokhulun, which constitute one of the families in Ugbokhare.This is the original history as confirmed from the elders according to tradition.

=== Leadership ===
The people of Ugbokhare are under the leadership of the eldest man who is called Odion Ugbokhare, who has a messenger or personal assistant called Ukor Idion and other subordinates. The Odion Ugbokhare in turn takes directions also from the Onojie of Irrua who is called the Okaijesam of Esan land. The land of Ugbokhare comprises three clans which is named after the three brothers they are referred to as Uwelen Uzebu who is said to be the eldest brother, followed by Uwelen Eneghi the second and the third is Uwelen Edomae. These clans are located in different areas of the village which are Egbemia, Abughe, Ibhiagbe, Ichechiala, Otoukho, Ukpagor, Izebu and Ukpofan.

=== Chiefs ===
There are some honourables in the land of Ugbokhare whom the Onojie of Irrua (the Okaijesan of Esan land) rewarded with chieftaincy title. They are; the late Imoisili who was called the chief aloh, late j A Aikore who was called the esanfure and thomas ohimua who is now the only chief at present.

=== Age groups ===
There are three main age groups in the land of Ugbokhare namely Egbonughe, Igene and Enedion. These age groups are given different traditional responsibilities. Unlike the Igene, the Enedoin and the Egonughe have major responsibilities. The Egbonughe are responsible for the sweeping and clearing of the major roads and town plannings they also maintain the borrow pit from which the villagers get water in dry seasons. While the Enedion maintain law and order and also directions, rules and regulations, and they settle disputes among the villagers.

== Festivals ==
Apart from the new yam festival which is referred to as iluotu celebrated by the ugbokhare people they also have other festivals: izomi which is dedicated to their local borrow pit and the iluekpe which is dedicated to their shrine ekpe bio olan which is said to be their god, where ekpe is the god and olan is his wife. This god is represented by bees and snakes, both of which were their protector in time of war. The ugbokhare youth movement both home and abroad celebrate their togetherness/annual meeting every Easter using ugbokhare primary school as their venue.

=== Traditional dance ===
The people of ugbokhare are known for igbabornelimi, asono and Igieleghe. the igbabonelimi is in the form of masquerade and is mainly danced by the uwelen edomaes and is mainly done by males while the asono and Igieleghe are done by both.

=== Food ===
The people of Ugbokhare, like all other Esanland eat traditional African foods made from Root Tubers like Cassava, Yam, and Cocoyam. They have their traditional Staple made from cereals like Maize or Corn, which they refer to as Okwo-Oka (Corn Meal). Other dishes includes food like Rice eaten with Stew, Beans, Egusi, Ogbono, Pounded yam, masa (corn cake), aha (matched roasted yam), esiuro, etc.
