= Ogwa =

Town in Edo State, Nigeria

Ogwa is a town in Esan West Local Government Area in Edo State, Nigeria. It is among the constituent communities of Esanland. The people of Ogwa speak the Esan language. The language of the Esan people shares the same name as the name of the land itself. Esan and Ishan are interchangeably used to refer to the same place, language and people. Ishan is the anglicized variant for Esan. The Ogwa people in Edo State identify themselves as Esan or Ishan people. Ogwa has four clans: Eguare, Ukpogu, Izogen and Eha. These clans are headed by most elderly men in each of them.

The name Ogwa is used to identify more than one place in Nigeria. To avoid confusion, it is better to identify it with their region. Hence, Ogwa, Esan.

== Demographics ==
Ogwa has a population of roughly 100,000 people. It is surrounded by other Esan towns, namely Ujiogba, Amahor, Ugun, Ewossa, Ebelle, Okalo, Ugbegun and Igueben.

Ogwa is the second largest community after Ekpoma and ward 1 politically in the Esan West Local Government Area of Edo State.

Ogwa is an agrarian society. However, events of the last part of the 20th century and the developments of 21st century so far have seen Ogwa drifting towards an academic town. Ogwa Grammar School, Edo State and Samuel Adegboyega University, Edo State are both located in Ogwa, Esan. The university was established in 2011 by The Apostolic Church, LAWNA Territory. The university has helped in the overall development of the Ogwa community.

The University has the Centre for Research and Development of Esanland (CERDEL) which is conducting several research activities about Esan traditions and culture. The Centre is headed by B.O Inegbeboh, a Professor of Oral Literature. Recently, the university gave out scholarship to some indigene in the community to enable them to pursue their educational career. It also has Eguare and Ukpogo primary schools and some private primary and secondary schools.

The people of Ogwa are mostly Christians. The majority of the people are Catholics. However, The Apostolic Church and other church denominations also have a large membership in Ogwa.

The Onogie of Ogwa is His Royal Highness (HRH) Zaiki Victor A. Ehizogie II. He governs with a Council of Chiefs which, unusually for the area, includes some women.

Ogwa has a significant problem with young women who are exploited through sex trafficking, and state interventions have been unsuccessful in addressing this crime. The problem is affected by the poverty of the area and the lack of opportunities for young people locally.

== Health ==
The Ogwa community enjoys a blend of traditional and orthodox medicine, with the presence of three Government owned health centres and Irrua Community hospitals, and is also closely linked with Irrua Specialist Teaching Hospital, Irrua, where a lot of people visit to receive health care. Traditional bone setters, traditional birth attendants and herbal healers are also fairly distributed around the community setting. Services offered at these centres include: health education, immunization, family planning counselling, treatment of minor ailments and first aid, referrals, and ante-natal.
