= Alu-Azido Shrine =

Shrine in Edo, Nigeria

The Alu-Azido shrine is located at the palace of Ewu, in southern Nigeria. The Alu-Azido is one of the major tourist attractions in the city of Ewu.

== Etymology ==
Alu is the Esan word for shrine or temple. Udo or Ido is the Esan word for stones, hence Alu-Azido means the shrine of stones. The Alu-Azido is a collection of naturally occurring and supposedly reoccurring stones at the palace of Ewu. The Alu-Azido or Azido, as it is commonly referred to, is a phenomenon in which does not have such occurrence anywhere else.

== History ==
In the early 20th century, the palace converted to Islam and the Onoje sought to remove every pagan idol from the palace. It is believed that when he removed the Azido in the night they would reoccur in the morning. After ineffective efforts to uproot what seemed to be the spiritual heritage of Ewu, he decided to continue in the tradition of his ancestors by leaving the stones alone.
