= Christopher Okojie =

Nigerian doctor, politician, administrator and historian

Christopher G Okojie OFR DSc (1920–2006) was a Nigerian doctor, politician, administrator and historian. He was born in Ugboha, in present-day Edo State, Nigeria. He was leader of the Mid-West Regional House of Assembly from 1964 to 1966. He was a former Health Minister of the Federal Republic of Nigeria (1992) and president of the Nigerian Medical Association (1974–1975). As minister, he was instrumental in pushing ahead a National Insurance Health Scheme. He died on October 7, 2006, at the age of 86. During his tenure as minister, he was able to bring roads and bore-hole water to the people of Esan.

He was a Fellow of the National Postgraduate Medical College of Nigeria (2002), a Fellow of the International College of Surgeons and a member of the Population Council of New York. In 1964, in recognition of his services to the nation, Okojie was invested with the national honour of Officer of the Order of the Federal Republic (OFR).

== Career ==
Dr Christopher Gbelokoto Okojie left the Colonial Service to work among his people, the impoverished rural people of Ishan (Esan) Division of present-day Edo State. He returned to his native district and started the Zuma Memorial Hospital on March 27, 1950, a private service that tried to supplement inadequate health services in Esan land. In addition to his work as a medical doctor, Okojie spent a significant part of his time researching and documenting Esan history, laws and customs. In 1960, he published a most comprehensive study on Esan history, Esan Native Laws and Customs: With Ethnological Studies of the Esan People. He had a long and illustrious career and continued to attend to patients when aged 85.

== Personal life ==
Okojie was married to Olayemi Phillips, and they had seven children. They were: Oseyi Oigboke, Anehita Akinsanya, Adesua Ilegbodu and Ebemeata Ani-Otoibhi (daughters), and the males children were Isi Okojie, and twins Ihimire Okojie and Ehidiamen Okojie (who died in December 2009). He owned and lived in a large estate, Zuma Memorial, in Irrua Edo State which comprised his personal residence, a hospital (Zuma Memorial Hospital), orphanage and accommodation for medical and domestic staff.
