= Benard =

Benard or Bénard is a surname or given name. Notable people with the name include:

== Surname ==
- Benard (surname)
- Bénard (surname)
- Paulo Bénard Guedes (1892–1960), Governor-General of Portuguese India

== Given name ==
- Benard E. Aigbokhan (born 1951), Nigerian academic
- Olumuyiwa Benard Aliu (born 1960), Nigerian President of the Council of the International Civil Aviation Organization
- Benard Ighner (1945–2017), American jazz musician
- Benard Keter (born 1992), American athlete
- Benard Kimeli (born 1995), Kenyan long-distance runner
- Benard Kipkorir Ngeno (born 1996), Kenyan long-distance runner
- Benard Nkanjo (born 1970), Zimbabwean sculptor
- Jean-Baptiste Bénard de la Harpe (1683–1765), French explorer
- Benard Kwaku Mensah (1924–?), Ghanaian politician
- Benard Otieno Okoth, Kenyan politician

== See also ==
- Bernard
- Besnard
