= Ibore =

Coordinates: 6°46′50″N 6°17′24″E

Ibore is an ancient city located in northern part of Esan an ethnic group in Edo state, Nigeria. It is one of the major towns in the present day Esan Central Local Government Area of Edo State.

== History ==
Ibore and Irrua kingdom has an issue of kingship. HRH Pa Ijienetemon Udegbe is the traditional ruler of Ibore kingdom. Ibore is an ancient city located in the northern part of Esan and an ethnic group in Edo State, Nigeria. It is one of the major towns in the present day Esan Central Local Government Area of Edo State. The original name is Ibhole. Ibhole was anglicized to Ibore by the Portuguese who first made direct contact with its natives. Ibore is one of the most culturally endowed towns in Esanland. Particularly unique among its numerous cultural heritage is the Iruen, Elbolo and Igbikhio festivals. Unlike most Esan villages and towns whose roots are from Bini, Ibore the 1st son of his father, migrated originally from Otuo (Owan) area of Edo state in the 15th and 16th century, along with two younger brothers called Atuagbo and Ugbalo and their uncle, Obiabi. They had a collective family surname name, known as Uneah. They settled in close proximity to each other. Ibore and his uncle Obiabi lived in the same vicinity, his youngest brother (Ugbalo), was a bit further at the center and Atuagbo, his immediate younger, was at the tail end of the locality. They co-existed and engaged themselves in common goals, as one family. They were all hunters by profession. Quarters in Ibore: Ibhole is divided into quarters, examples are Afuokhuaria, Afonza, Afumeimen, Afuanko, Idumegbor, Idinegbon Udugei, Obiabi, Idunoko, Ikekihiala and Aferejoudu.

== Quarters in Ibore ==
Ibhole is divided into Quarters, examples are Afuokhuaria, Afonza, Afuomemen, Afuanko, Idumegbor, Idinegbon Udugei, Obiabi, Idunoko, Ikekihiala and Aferejoudu.

== Notable families ==
Notable families from Ibore include the Aluede family, Ughulu family, Amomoh family, Abuya, Akele, Anetor, Igenegbale, Ikheloa, Enabulu, Umoru, Evah, Egegele, Adaghebalu, Inibhunu, Okeke, Ebhodaghe, Ewanlen, Uikhenan, Uwaya, Osereme, Iwelomen, Efojie, Ediale, Azegbea, Omankhanlen, Akhigbe, Ugbesia, Aluede, Ohue, Okagwi Ubebe, Okojie, Okosun, Odigie, 0mokodon, Omenai, Okoroson, Iyile, Agidi, Iyere, Aijiabhu, Omenai, Ojeikhudu, Okhale, Omoifoh, Iselobhor, Okoh, Okoedion, Ijie, Oriaifoh, Okoror, Ikpea, Inotu, Esene, Odiboh, Ebhohimen, Itotoh, Akhimien, Aisebeogun, Ojemen, Oyabure, Ehichioya, Omongida, Oigbochie, Owobu, Aigbomian, Aigberemoin, Esezobor, Oiyehi, Udegbe, Oboism, Elimighale, Oamen, Okhiria, Okaka, Umuobuare, and Orhiabure.

Other most notable sons of this small town in Nigeria are Genesis Inibhunu, late Sonny Okosun (Ozidizi), M.O. Ijie, Oziegbe Ubebe, Henry Osime Omenai, Henry Ibhade Omenai and Peter Okoh.
