= Grace Ofure Ibhakhomu =

Nigerian economist, businesswoman, and entrepreneur (born 1978

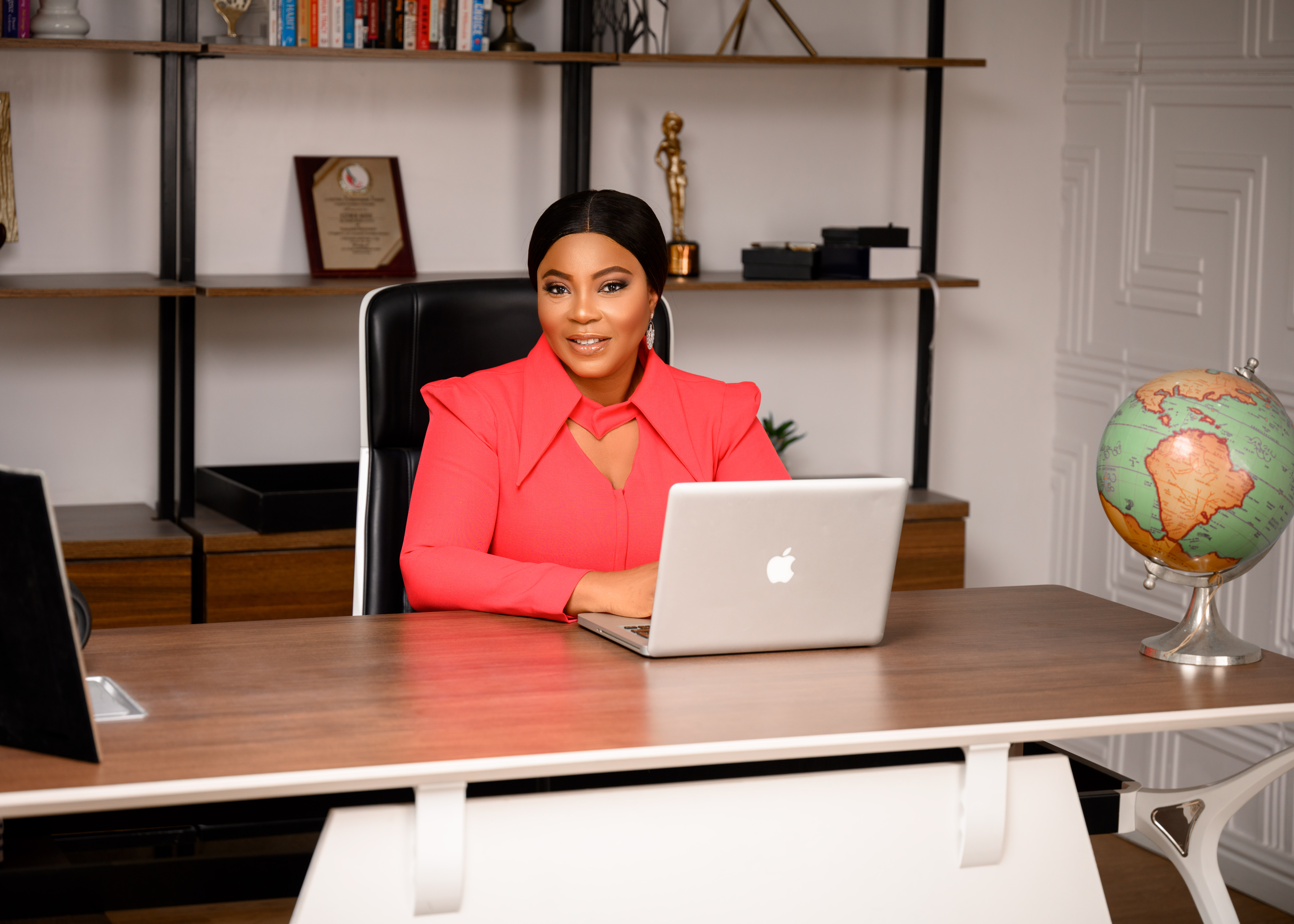
- Born: 28 April 1978 (age 48); Ekpoma, Edo State, Nigeria
- Other name: Grace Ofure
- Citizenship: Nigerian
- Education: Ambrose Alli University, Ekpoma
- Occupations: CEO, Lifecard International Investment Limited, Founder, The Grace Ofure Foundation
- Spouse: Christopher Ibhakhomu (m. 2003)
- Website: https://www.graceofure.com

Grace Ofure Ibhakhomu, also known as Grace Ofure, is a Nigerian economist, businesswoman, real estate expert, and philanthropist. She is the CEO of Lifecard International Investment Limited, proprietor and founder of Lifecard University, an online school, and the Grace Ofure Foundation, a charity organization.

== Early life ==
Grace Ofure was born on April 28, 1978, in Ekpoma, Edo, Nigeria. She completed her primary and secondary education at University Primary School and University Secondary School in Ekpoma. She later received a Bachelor of Arts in Business Administration from Bendel State University (now Ambrose Alli University) in Ekpoma. Additionally, she received a degree in the Owner's Management Programme (OMP24) from the Lagos Business School.

== Career ==
Ofure's business career began in 2003 when she sold second-hand clothes, known as "Okrika," and was mentored by an old classmate to focus on real estate investment. In 2019, she launched the Lifecard Company and is currently its CEO. Under her leadership, the company has expanded into several countries worldwide.

== Philanthropy ==
In December 2020, Ofure created the "Nigerian for Nigeria Initiative Awards" as the managing director of Lifecard International Investment and established the Grace Ofure Foundation. The foundation supports and empowers women, children, and youths in society.
