= Patrick Ikhariale =

Nigerian politician

Member of House of Representative
- In office June 2011 – June 2015
- Constituency: Esan Central / Esan West / Igueben Federal Constituency

Personal details
- Party: All Progressives Congress
- Occupation: Politician

Patrick Ikhariale is a Nigerian politician who served as a member of the House of Representatives from 2011 to 2015, representing the Esan Central/Esan West/Igueben Federal Constituency of Edo State.

== Background and early life ==
Patrick is from Opoji, Esan Central Local Government Area of Edo State, Nigeria.

== Political career ==
Ikhariale was elected to the 7th House of Representatives in 2011 under the platform of the People's Democratic Party (PDP), representing the Esan Central/Esan West/Igueben Federal Constituency of Edo State, Nigeria.

During his tenure in the House of Representatives from 2011 to 2015, Patrick Ikhariale served as the Chairman of the House Committee on Power.

In December 2013, Ikhariale, defected from the Peoples Democratic Party (PDP) to the All Progressives Congress (APC). After his tenure in the House of Representatives in 2015, Ikhariale continued his involvement with the All Progressives Congress (APC). In February 2021, he revalidated his membership in the party.

In 2023, Ikhariale was appointed Secretary of the Edo State Transition Committee under Governor Monday Okpebholo. The committee was tasked with ensuring a smooth transfer of power from the outgoing administration to the new government.

Ikhariale also served as Secretary of a 14-man Assets Verification Committee established by Governor Okpebholo to probe the administration of the outgoing Edo State Governor, Godwin Obaseki. The committee's mandate included verifying state assets and providing recommendations for effective governance.
