= Christy Ogbah =

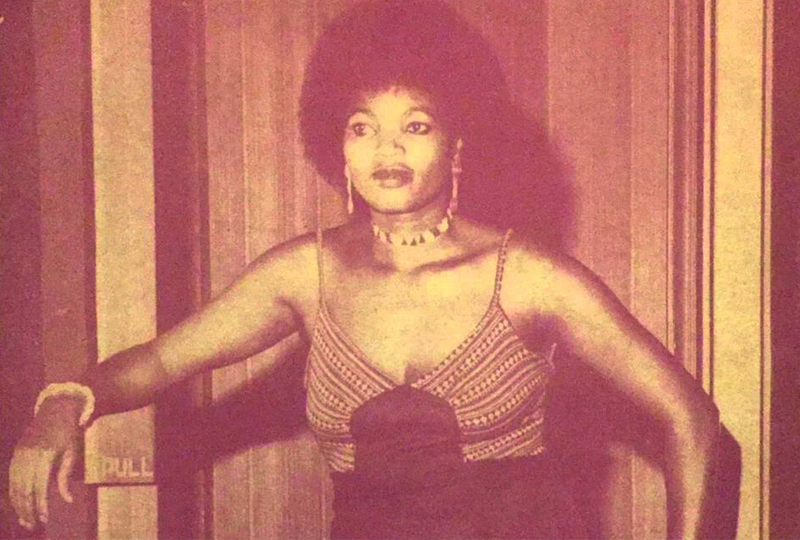
- Background Information
- Born: Ugboha, Edo State
- Style: Afro-funk, Highlife, Disco, Traditional Esan Music

Christy Ogbah is a Nigerian musician and one of the earliest prominent female Esan-language recording artists. She was active mainly in the 1970s and hails from Ugboha Kingdom, in present-day Esan South-East Local Government Area of Edo State, Nigeria. Ogbah is recognised for her fusion of Afro-funk, highlife, disco, and traditional Esan musical forms.

She is widely regarded as a pioneer among women in Nigeria popular music at a time when the Nigerian recording industry was largely dominated by male performers.

== Early life and background ==
Christy Ogbah was born and raised in Ugboha, an Esan-speaking Kingdom in Edo State. She grew up in a cultural environment in which music played an important role in ceremonies, storytelling, and community life. These early influences shaped her later use of Esan language, folklore, proverbs, and dirges in her recorded works.

== Career ==
Ogbah rose to prominence in the 1970s, recording music with Nigerian and international record labels including Duomo, Mosokam, Decca Records (Afrodisia imprint), and Blackspot Records. Her recordings blended contemporary popular styles such as disco and Afro-funk with traditional Esan lyrical content and melodic structures.

One of her most recognised songs, “Advice,” gained popularity for its dance-oriented arrangement and prominent use of electric guitar and synthesizers. During part of her recording career, Ogbah reportedly worked as a police officer, an uncommon parallel profession among Nigerian musicians of that period.

Her music has continued to circulate through reissues and digital releases, leading to renewed interest in her work decades after her original recordings.

== Musical style and themes ==
Christy Ogbah’s music is characterised by the extensive use of the Esan language, the fusion of traditional folk elements with modern popular music styles, and lyrical themes addressing morality, patience, social conduct, love, time, and communal values.

In addition to dance-oriented tracks, she recorded dirges and reflective songs that are used within Esan communities during periods of mourning and remembrance.

== Discography ==
=== Albums ===
- Advice
- Iziegbe
- Oyomon Ale (reissued 2023; 2025)

== Cultural significance and legacy ==
Ogbah is regarded as a notable Esan minstrel, with her music serving both entertainment and cultural functions. Her work has been referenced in academic and cultural discussions on Esan music, particularly in relation to the role of music in emotional expression and communal coping, including bereavement practices.

House of Irawo acknowledged Christy Ogbah inspiration for their TADA capsule collection.

Her recordings remain available on digital platforms such as YouTube, Apple Music, Boomplay, and SoundCloud, contributing to the preservation and continued appreciation of Esan musical heritage.
