= Sonny Okosun =

Nigerian musician (1947–2008)

- Also known as: Sunny Okosuns
- Born: 1 January 1947; Edo State, Nigeria
- Died: 24 May 2008 (aged 61) Howard University Hospital, Washington DC
- Genres: Highlife, reggae, gospel music
- Occupation: Musician
- Instruments: Electric guitar, flute, saxophone, electric piano, percussion, vocals
- Years active: 1960s–2000s
- Label: Ozzidi sound

Sonny Okosun (1 January 1947 – 24 May 2008) was a Nigerian musician, who was known as the leader of the Ozzidi band. He named his band Ozzidi after a renowned Ijaw river god, but to Okosun the meaning was "there is a message". His surname is sometimes spelled Okosuns and his first name Sunny. He was one of the leading Nigerian musicians from the late 1970s to mid-1980s.

Okosun's brand of African pop music, Ozzidi, is a synthesis of Afro-beat, reggae and funk music. From 1977, he became known for protest songs about Pan-Africanism, freedom and a few other social and political issues affecting Africans.

== Early life ==
As a young boy, Okosun spent his early childhood with his grandmother at Ibore, near Irrua in Edo State. Thereafter, he moved to Enugu to live with his parents, where his father worked with the Nigerian Railway Corporation. Okosun attended various training schools starting with St Brigid's School, Asata, Enugu before enrolling at a government trade centre in Enugu. He left the training centre before completing his studies. Excited by a career in entertainment, he traveled to Lagos to further his interest in acting. In Lagos, he took drama lessons at a drama school in Surulere but left after a few months returning to Enugu. In Enugu, Okosun found an opportunity in small roles where he participated in a few dramatic productions; he also worked with a notable Enugu drama studies teacher, professor John Okwerri. His participation in Okwerri's group and his determination to succeed in entertainment led him to be featured in some radio and TV skits with the Eastern Nigeria Television Station.

== Career ==
=== 1960s: Early years ===
Okwerri was a member of the Mbari Club, the movement started by Ulli Beier, with J. P. Clark and Wole Soyinka was a meeting spot for artists and writers. It was there that Okosun began to develop an interest in music. Appearances at the Eastern regional television station gained him notice from Mariam Okagbue, who bought him a guitar and encouraged him to continue working on music. In 1965, he was a participant in a drama group that won the first prize at a competition, the group's winning play was a dramatic version of J. P. Clark's Song of a Goat and Okwerri's Masquerades. As the winning group they represented Nigeria in the 1965 Commonwealth Arts Festival held in London. He used the opportunity to tour England attending concerts by the Rolling Stones, The Who, and Herman's Hermits. When he returned, Okosun joined the cast of Ukonu's Club, an Eastern Nigeria Television variety show where he was able to showcase his guitar playing abilities.

In 1966, he joined the band the Postmen as a rhythm guitarist. The band played the music of Cliff Richard, Elvis Presley and the Beatles.

At the onset of the civil war, Okosun and his family who were from the Mid-West and not from Eastern Nigeria had to flee the region and move to Lagos. In Lagos, he worked as a stagehand for a television station and jammed with a number of groups. In 1969, he found steady work as a second guitarist in Victor Uwaifo's Maestros. Uwaifo, still riding on his hit, "Joromi", took his band to a tour in Japan and Europe. While, he was with Uwaifo, he honed his skills in musical composition by experimenting with a fusion of African and rock rhythms.

=== 1970s: Ozzidi sound ===
From 1972 to 1974, he led a band that was originally called Paperback Limited but later regrouped as Ozzidi. Prior to regrouping as Ozzidi, he and some members of his group teamed with Fela and his group, the Koola Lobitos, to play gigs in the Yaba area of Lagos. On forming Ozzidi, Okosun released several albums either with the band or as a solo artist. The albums included Ozzidi, Living Music and Ozzidi for Sale. The band's early sound blended the highlife traditions of his Edo heritage with guitar-driven arrangements. The Times also noted that Ozzidi fused elements of Congolese rumba, western rock, Latin and calypso rhythms".

He had his first break with the single "Help", which sold close to a hundred thousand copies in Nigeria. The lineup of the Ozzidi band was headed by Okosun as lead vocalist, supported by three backup dancers, a trombone player, keyboardist, bass and trap drums.

Towards the late 1970s, Okosun began to release a string of reggae infused Afro-pop music. His 1977 song "Fire in Soweto" became a major international hit and his first gold album. He was featured on the anti-apartheid album Sun City, and his song "Highlife" was on the soundtrack of the 1986 film Something Wild. He released another LP album, Power to the People, followed with a tour in some Nigerian cities.

=== 1980s ===
He released his first American album in 1984 under Shanachie Records. His next American record, Which Way Nigeria, was released in 1985 under the EMI label in Nigeria and licensed to Jive Records for international promotions.

His mainstream success started to fade in the late 1980s, but he continued his career as a gospel musician under the name Evangelist Sonny Okosun.

=== 1990s ===
By 1993, Okosun had started moving towards gospel music, he released the gospel album Songs of Praise, followed by another gospel piece tagged Revival. In 1998, he started the House of Prayer Ministry, a Christian church located at Ogba area in Ikeja, Lagos state.

== Later life ==
Okosun died aged 61 of colon cancer on 24 May 2008 at Howard University Hospital, Washington DC. He was buried at his residence on Yaya Abatan Street, Ogba, Lagos, Nigeria.

His musical styles included reggae, highlife, Afro-funk, and gospel, among others. He made music in a number of languages, including Esan, Igbo, Yoruba, Hausa, and English.

== Discography ==
- Ozzidi (1976)
- Ozzidi For Sale (1976)
- Living Music (NCC, 1977)
- Papa's Land (NCC, 1977)
- Fire in Soweto (OTI, 1978)
- Holy Wars (NEMI, 1978)
- 3rd World (NEMI, 1981)
- Mother And Child (OTI, 1982)
- Which Way Nigeria? (Jive Afrika, 1983)
- Liberation (Shanachie, 1984)
- Revolution II (HMV, 1985)
- Africa Now Or Never (HMV, 1986)
- Ozzidi/Ozone (1989)
- African Soldier (Profile, 1991)

== Sources ==
- Collins, J. (1992). West African Pop Roots. Philadelphia: Temple University Press.
