= Ujiogba =

Ujiogba is a kingdom located in Esan West Local Government Area of Edo State, South South Nigeria. The Kingdom is headed by an Onojie shares boundary with Ogwa community and Ehor Village. The kingdom is largely an agrarian society and dominated by the Esan speaking people.

The current king of Ujiogba Kingdom is HRM Zaiki Solomon Ojeaga Izuware I, installed July 2011
