= Benard E. Aigbokhan =

Nigerian academic and educator

- Born: October 3, 1951 (age 74); Ewu, Edo, Nigeria
- Occupation: Economist
- Spouses: Fummilayo Ogedengb (m. 1985; div. 1988) Rita Ekhuelohan Atoe (m. 1991)
- Children: 3

Academic background
- Education: University of East London; University of Stirling
- Alma mater: University of Paisley

Academic work
- Discipline: Economics

Benard E. Aigbokhan is a Nigerian academic, (born October 3, 1951) and an economics educator. He served as the Vice-Chancellor of Samuel Adegboyega University, Nigeria from January 7, 2013 to January 6, 2020.

== Early life ==
Eronmonsele was born in Ewu Ishan, Edo, Nigeria to the family of David Ikhifa and Comfort Otiti Aigbokhan on October 3, 1952. In 1978 he earned his Bachelor of Science in Economics at the University East London, England, and his Master of Science in Economics at the University of Stirling, Scotland, 1979. His PhD in Economics came at University of the West of Scotland, formerly University of Paisley, Scotland, 1985.

== Career ==
Eronmonsele started his career serving as a Clerical officer in Federal Ministry of Information, Lagos state from 1972 to 1973. Then, he went to Scotland and worked as Teaching assistant at Paisley University from 1982 to 1985. After that, he returned to Nigeria on an appointment as a Lecturer in Imo State University in 1986 and proceeded to Edo State University, Ekpoma, from 1987 to 1992 as a reader. He became a professor in Economics in 1995. He later became a Resource person for the National Committee for UNESCO in Lagos state from 1989 to 1991 and in National Center for Economic Management and Administration in Ibadan, Nigeria, beginning in 1991.

== Works ==
Eronmonsele wrote on Planning, Employment and Income Distribution in Nigeria in 1988. He wrote on Macroeconomic Theory, Policy and Evidence in 1995. He worked as an Editor for Iroro Journal of Arts and Social Sciences from 1987 to 1992. He was a Contributor for Global Visions: Beyond New World Order in 1993. He wrote 13 works in 23 publications in 1 language. He has also attended and presented papers in many numerous academic conferences.

== Personal life ==
Eronmonsele married Fummilayo Ogedengb on August 3, 1985. They divorced in November 1988. He married Rita Ekhuelohan Atoe on January 2, 1991 and has 3 children.
