= Godly Showpromoter =

Musician and producer

Chief Ozemire Godly Showpromoter Okoduwa
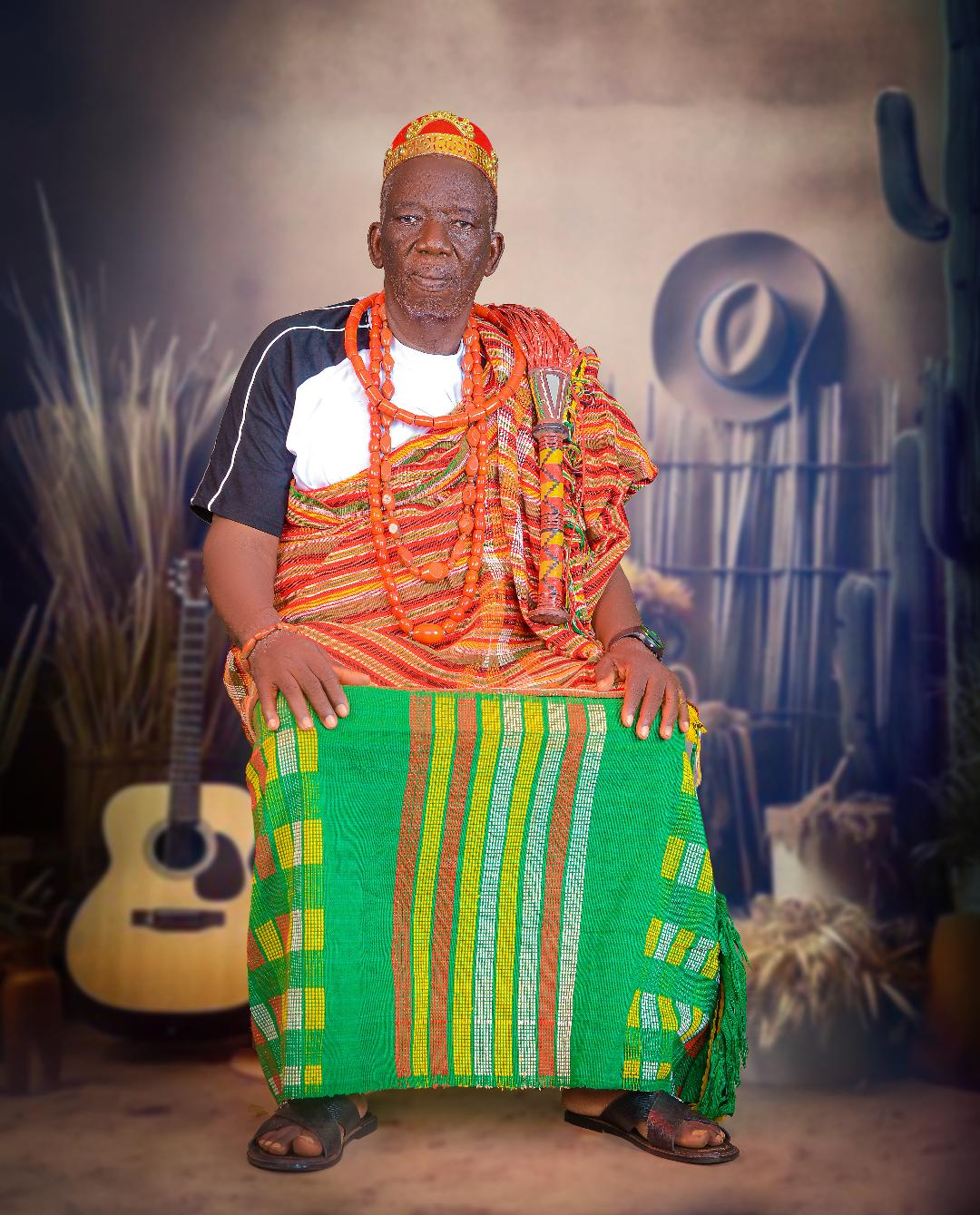

Background information
- Born: John Okoduwa; 1948 (age 77–78); Idunmhu Ague Afandion in Uromi
- Genre: Highlife
- Occupations: Musician, songwriter and producer

John Okoduwa (born 1948), known professionally as Godly Showpromoter, is a Nigerian highlife musician from Uromi in Esanland, Edo State. He is regarded as one of the early promoters of Obito Highlife music, an Esan variant of highlife music performed at weddings, funerals and social events. He adapted traditional Esan musical styles such as Asonogun, Ojeke and Umahenbhonlen to modern band instrumentation, leading to the establishment of indigenous Esan live-band music within ceremonial contexts in Esanland.

== Early life and career ==
Godly Showpromoter was born in 1948 to the family of Okoduwa Eboh in Uromi, Edo State. He developed interest in music after watching a live performance of Sir Victor Uwaifo in Uromi. He later relocated to Benin City, where he joined Uwaifo’s band and received practical training in live band performance, stagecraft, musical arrangement, and instrumental coordination.

== Obito highlife music ==
Godly Showpromoter infusion Asonogun, Ojeke, and Umahenbholen using modern instruments gave birth to the Obito genre of highlife music, growth, and live‑band performances in Esanland at social ceremonies. The style emerged from his attempt to modernise traditional Esan sounds by incorporating modern instruments, including guitars, saxophones, drums and amplified band arrangements.

=== Selected Songs ===
A 2026 profile in The Guardian Nigeria listed the following songs:

- "Osenebula Nomagbon"
- "Shokolokobagoshi"
- "Eyemo Olealen"
- "Ibhokhan Nmukpano"
- "Alebalu"
- "Nigeria My Country"

In 2024, he marked his 50th year in music with the album Golden Jubilee: God the Creator, in which he revisited and remastered some of his classic songs. His songs often incorporate Esan language, proverbs, storytelling traditions, and reflections on daily life.

== Mentorship and recognition ==
The Guardian 2026 profile states that Godly Showpromoter mentored several Esan musicians such as Dr Afile, Sir Sunny Ben, Ambassador Joker Boy, Alasagbon, Jereke Super Star, and Young Shall Grow.

In 2022, he was conferred with a chieftaincy title "Ozemire" (meaning The Pioneer) by His Royal Majesty, Zaiki Anslem Odaloighe Edenojie II, the Onojie of Uromi Kingdom, making him the Chief Ozemire of Uromi Kingdom; coming decades after being recognized by the Esan National Students Association, for his role in the popularization of Obito Highlife music.
