= Festus Iyayi =

Nigerian writer (1947–2013)

- Born: 29 September 1947; Ugbegun, Esanland, Edo State, Nigeria
- Died: 12 November 2013 (aged 66)
- Occupations: Writer, academic
- Notable work: Former president of the Academic Staff Union of Universities (ASUU)

Festus Iyayi (29 September 1947 – 12 November 2013) was a Nigerian leftist writer, best known for advancing his politics through realist novels depicting the sociopolitical environment of contemporary Nigeria. He was also a former president of the Academic Staff Union of Universities (ASUU). He died in a road accident on his way to Kano.

== Life and education ==
Iyayi was born in Ugbegun in Esanland, Edo State, Nigeria. His family lived on little means but instilled in him strong moral lessons about life. Iyayi started his education at Annunciation Catholic College (ACC) in the old Bendel State, finishing in 1966, in 1967 he went to Government College Ughelli, graduating in 1968. In that same year he was a zonal winner in a Kennedy Essay Competition organised by the United States Embassy in Nigeria.

Iyayi left Nigeria to pursue his higher education, obtaining a MSc in industrial economics from the Kiev Institute of Economics, in the former USSR (now Ukraine), and then his PhD from the University of Bradford, England. In 1980, he went back to Benin and became a lecturer in the Department of Business Administration at the University of Benin. As a member of staff of the university, he became interested in radical social issues, and a few years after his employment, he became the president of the local branch of the Academic Staff Union of Universities (ASUU), a radical union known for its upfront style on academic and social welfare. He rose to the position of president of the national organization in 1986, but in 1988, the union was briefly banned and Iyayi was detained. In that same year he won the Commonwealth Writers Prize for his novel Heroes. He was later removed from his faculty position by the Alele Williams administration and he got back his job after winning the court case against the school authority and the government with the help of human rights lawyer Femi Falana.

Iyayi was one of the best lecturers at the Department of Business Administration, University of Benin. His students spanned from Undergraduates to Postgraduates. His interests included behavioural science in business, human resources management, key concepts such as workplace alienation, theory of needs, work and task, recruitment and selection, different paradigms: radical, system, political etc. Iyayi was a key resource person who delivered lectures in the University of Benin Business School (MBA), whose graduates can attest to the qualities of his lectures and supervisions.

He died in a car accident caused by a convoy of the then Kogi State governor Idris Wada while on his way to Kano State to attend the National Executive Council meeting of the Academic Staff Union of Universities (ASUU) concerning a four-month strike embarked upon by the union. Iyayi was a member of different Nigerian literary organizations and worked in the private sector as a consultant.

== Works ==
- Violence, Longman (1979). ISBN 0-582-64247-7
- The Contract, Longman (1982). ISBN 0-582-78524-3
- Heroes, Longman (c1986). ISBN 0-582-78603-7
- Awaiting Court Martial, Ikeja, Lagos: Malthouse Press (1996). ISBN 978-2601-79-9

== See also ==
- Ngũgĩ wa Thiong'o
- Meja Mwangi
