= Igbabonelimhin =

Acrobatic dance unique to Esan people

Igbabonelimhin is an acrobatic, masquerade dance-theatre common with the Esan people of Edo State of Nigeria. The word literally means “clapping for the spirit”. Igbabonelimhin is a compound word for 'Igbabo' which literary means to clap and 'Elimlin' which means Spirit. Conjuctively, it means to clap hands or commune with the spirit. Hence, the name is derived from the action of the dance or performance.

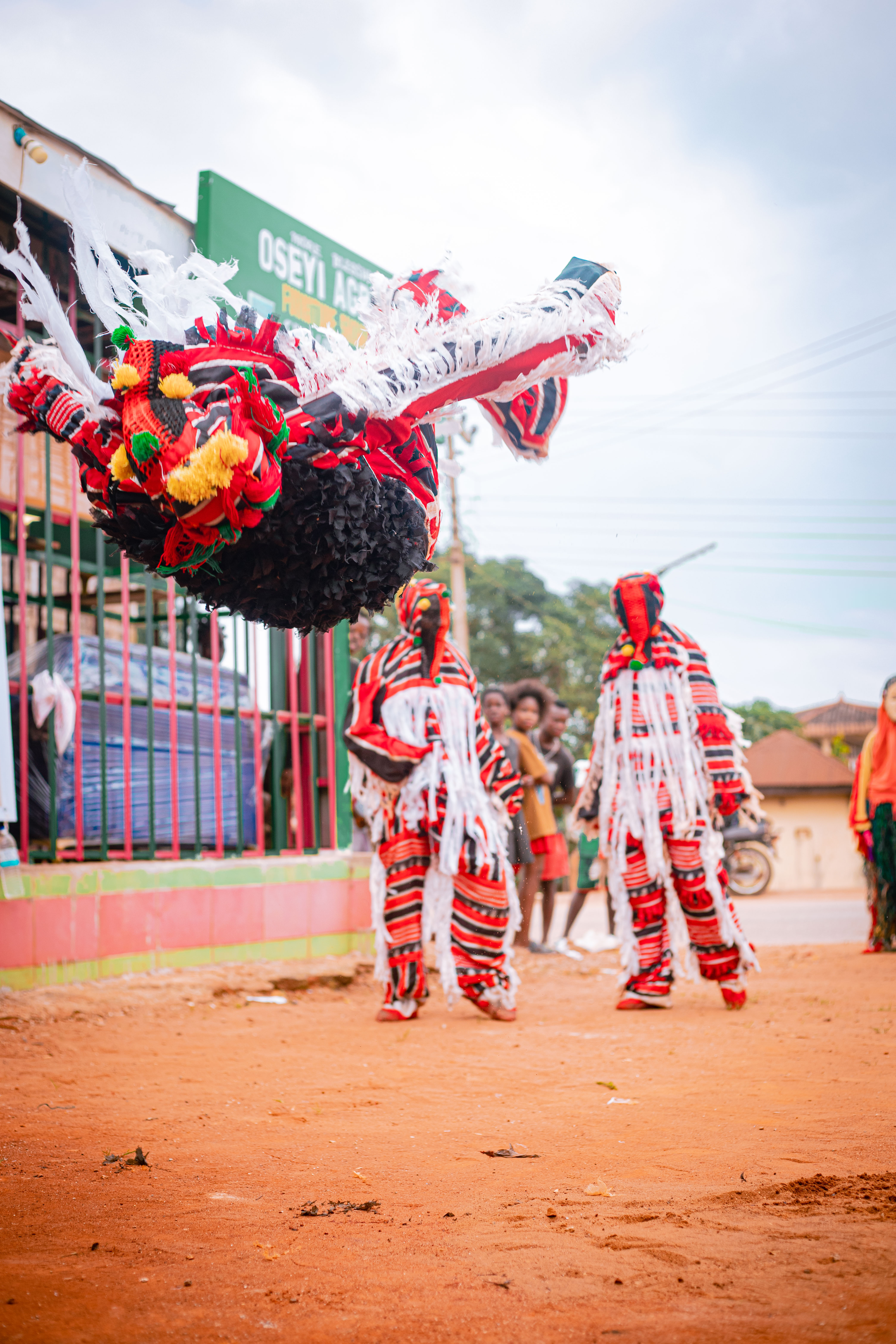
Igbabonelimhin dancer, a unique acrobatic dance of the Èsán people

== Background ==
The Igbabonelimhin dance is performed by masquerades with costumes made from hand-woven, multi-coloured fabrics called Igbuluododo.

The Igbabonelimhin is performed by a group (sect) of young adults who must go through special training stages and initiation rites to be eligible. The training stages includes: the Ikhienlen Oto (ground dance), Ogayikeken (summersaulting) and Iruen-Ebe (initiation rites) into the sect are performed by the elders of the sect.

Igbabonelimhin is also seen as a social cult with its own regulations and taboos. Characters who perform are seen to have come from 'elimhin' (spirit world) and are revered as such, especially by non-initiates called 'ogbodu'. The structure of or seniority of the elimhins (spirit) is also hierarchical. In the context of performance, the smaller of the elimhins dance first, then the "Odion-elimhin" (senior spirit). The most senior of the elimhin which is the overall head of the cult controls the cult and the dancers. He makes sure that no one goes against the regulations of the organisation.
