= Ewohimi =

Town in Edo State, Nigeria

Ewohimi Ebhoikimi
- Town
- Location in Nigeria
- Coordinates: 6°28′N 6°19′E
- Country: Nigeria
- State: Edo
- Time zone: UTC+1 (WAT)
- Climate: Aw

Ebho-Ikhimi, popularly called Ewohimi is an ancient kingdom in Esan South East Local Government Area of Edo State, Nigeria. Ebho-Ikhimi lies on the geographical coordinate of latitude 6°28′N 6°19′E and consists of several towns.

== History ==
The name of the Kingdom is EbhoIkhimi (meaning "people of Ikhimi") The Kingdom was founded by a man named Ikhimi.

It has various infrastructural facilities, example: Ewohimi General Hospital at Okaigben, the head office and asphalt plant of Skaff Construction Company Nigeria Limited is in Ewohimi, the Ewohimi water project, three government secondary schools, private secondary schools, private health centres, hotels, guest house and some streets and major roads constructed with two side drainages.

== Religion and Belief ==
The EbhoIkhimi people, predominantly found in the Esan South East Local Government Area Edo State of Nigeria, are known for their rich cultural heritage, which encompasses a wide range of beliefs, mythology, and rituals. They are one of the major populous Kingdom in Esan land and their language also is called Esan, is a member of the Niger-Congo language family. The Esan people's traditions and folklore revolve around an intricate pantheon of deities, heroes, and mythical creatures.

Deities in Esan Mythology:

Osenobula: Osenobula also known as Osenudazi, He is the supreme deity and Creator of the Heavens and the Earth and all its inhabitants. He is the omniscient, omnipresent, and omnipotent God who create and rules over all other gods and goddesses. Osanobula is responsible for the creation of the world, humankind, and the Esan cosmology, which comprises the heavens, the earth, the waters and the underworld.

Olokun: Olokun is the Esan god of the sea and is often associated with wealth, fertility, and beauty. Depicted as a water-dwelling being with an ornate crown, Olokun is revered for their power over the seas and their ability to provide bountiful harvests and prosperity to his worshipers. Worshippers of Olokun engage in various rituals, including offerings of food, dance, and prayer.

Ogun/Idigun: Idigun is the Esan god of iron, metalwork, and war. He is a revered deity among the Esan people, known for his role in the creation of the world. As the patron god of blacksmiths and warriors, Idigun is often invoked for protection and guidance during battles or when dealing with conflict.

Osun: This is the Esan god of medicine.

Esu: Esu is the trickster deity in Esan mythology, often associated with chaos, mischief, and unpredictability. Despite his mischievous nature, Esu is an essential figure in the Esan pantheon, serving as the messenger between humans and gods. He is responsible for conveying prayers and offerings to the gods, ensuring that people receive their just rewards and punishments.

== Unique Beliefs in Esan Culture ==
The Esan people have several unique beliefs that differentiate their mythology from other African cultures. One such belief is the concept of "Erinmwin," which refers to the spirit world or the unseen realm. The Esan people believe that the physical world and the spirit world coexist and interact with each other, influencing the lives of humans. Ancestors, deities, and spirits all reside in Erinmwin, and the Esan people engage in various rituals to communicate with these beings.

Another unique belief is the significance of "Ehi," a person's guardian spirit or soul. The Esan people believe that each individual has an Ehi, which guides and protects them throughout their life. The Ehi is thought to possess knowledge of a person's destiny, and it is very essential to develop a strong connection with one's Ehi to achieve success and fulfillment in life.

== Notable people ==
- Asue Ighodalo, a lawyer, chairman of sterling bank, and Nigeria brewery
- Alex Usifoh, a Nollywood actor
