= Ebelle =

Town in Igueben, Edo, Nigeria

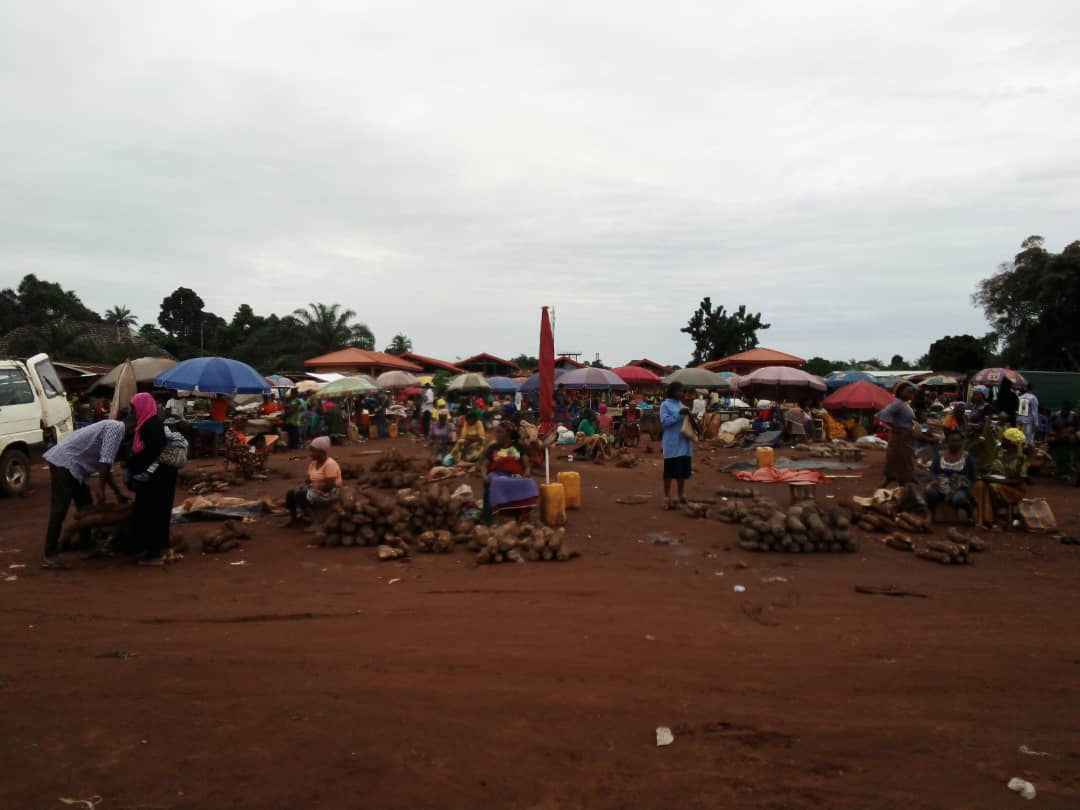
Ebelle Market

Ebelle, one of the major Esan kingdoms in Edo State, Nigeria, is a populated place located in Igueben Local Government Area of Edo State, Nigeria. Within Ebelle are the villages of Owa, Ologhe, Okuta, Okpujie, Idumowu, and Eguare.

== Origin ==
Ebelle was founded in the middle of the 14th century AD when Prince Agbabhoko of Uta-gbunuo clan of Kwale migrated from his community to the area now known as Ebelle because of a political crisis in his place of origin. This happened during the reign of Oba Ogbeka of Benin Kingdom (during his reign, there was wide spread migration from Benin to escape wars, search for an adventure or a convenient place of abode).

When Prince Agbabhoko came to Ebelle, he told the people of his royal pedigree. As a result, he was made king. When news of the prince reached the Oba of Benin, he was summoned. The Oba was impressed with the prince and placed him under royal protection. He was also given a royal sword of rulership over Ebelle thereby solidifying his reign as king.

== Leadership ==
Ebelle is ruled by a king, called Onojie by the Esan people. Since the history of Ebelle Kingdom, it has been ruled by 17 Onojies. The Onojie rules from the administrative capital - Eguare. Below is a list of all the Onojies of Ebelle from its founding till date:

1. Agbabhoko (1410 - 1459)
2. Omlu (1459 - 1462)
3. Idigba (1462 - 1575)
4. Okokhere (1575 - 1611)
5. Okisi (1611 - 1672)
6. Imi (1672 - 1720)
7. Enohomijie (1720 - 1782) - the longest reigning king
8. Iguare (1782 - 1790)
9. Osawemen (1790 - 1800)
10. Ogun (1800 - 1849)
11. Ogbeide (1849 - 1880)
12. Akhuiwu (1880 - 1899)
13. Akhimien (1899 - 1907)
14. Emovuon (1907 - 1910) - the shortest reigning king
15. Igbinigie (1910 - 1971)
16. Imadogiemu (1971 - 1998)
17. Aikpaogie (1998 - present)
