= Esan West =

Coordinates: 6°45′12″N 6°4′26″E

- LGA
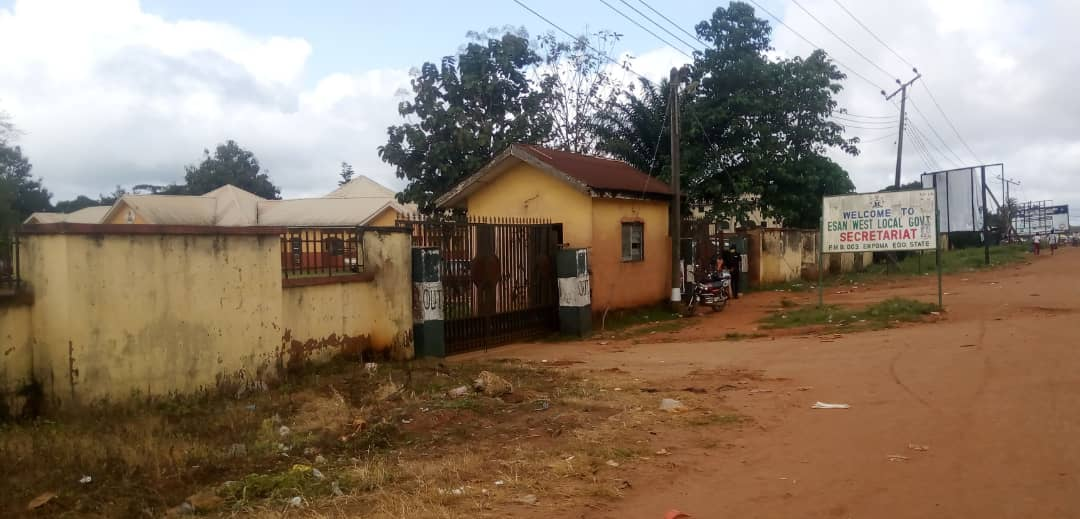
- Esan West Local Government Secretariat
- Interactive map of Esan West
- Country: Nigeria
- State: Edo State
- Capital: Ekpoma

Government
  - Type: Local Government
  - Honourable: Godsent Aigboibo LGA Chairman from December 2024

Area
  - Total: 502 km^{2} (194 sq mi)
  - Density: 333.3/km^{2} (863/sq mi)
- Density from 2016
- Time zone: UTC+1 (WAT)

Esan West (formerly Okpevbo) is a Local Government Area of Edo State, Nigeria. Its headquarters are in the town of Ekpoma.

It has an area of 502 km^{2} and Esan West (Ekpoma) has an estimated population of over 190,000 people which consists of an adult male population of over 60,000 and adult female population of over 60,000. The postal code of the area is 310.

It has an area of 502 km^{2} and a population density of 333.3/km^{2} [2016]

== Towns and villages ==
Ekpoma, Iruekpen, Ujemen, Idumebo, Ihumudumu, Uhiele, Emuhi, Ogwa, Ekhiro, Ukpenu, Ujoelen Eguare, Emaudo, Egoro Amede, Egoro Naoka, Ebhakuala, Ukhun, Idoa, Urohi, Akahio, Illeh, Ekoh-Ine, Ujiogba.

== Tourist centers and attractions ==
Commemorative statue of Professor Ambrose Alli, Ibiekuma River and Onojie Palaces; Ekhuan Shrine, Itio-Ukhun; Oghedekpe River, and Orosun Water falls both in Ukhun Kingdom.

== Geography and climate ==
Esan West has an average temperature of 28 degrees Celsius or 82.4 degrees Fahrenheit and a total area of 502 square kilometres or 194 square miles. The LGA has an average wind speed of 9 km/h (5.6 mph) and an average humidity of 69%. The rainy and dry seasons are the two main seasons of Esan West LGA, which has a tropical savannah climate. With an average daily high of about 32 °C (90 °F) in the larger Southwest Nigeria region, the area sees hot temperatures all year round. Generally speaking, relative humidity ranges from 50% to 75% during the dry season and from 75% to 90% during the wet season.

== Educational facilities ==
In addition to the Ambrose Alli University, Ekpoma and Samuel Adegboyega University, Ogwa, there are 48 primary and 12 secondary schools in Ekpoma.

Hubus-Salam Educational Foundation, Mount Camel School John Bosco International School, Christ Foundation Nursery and Primary School, Moscow International School; Christ the King Nursery & Primary School, Christ Adam College, Cosmopolitan Church Primary School, Ujoelen Grammar School, Ujoelen Ekpoma.
