= Esanland =

Esanland Otọesan
- Cultural Region
- Motto: "Ma khato, ma khale, ise" "We shall live long, we shall reign, amen"
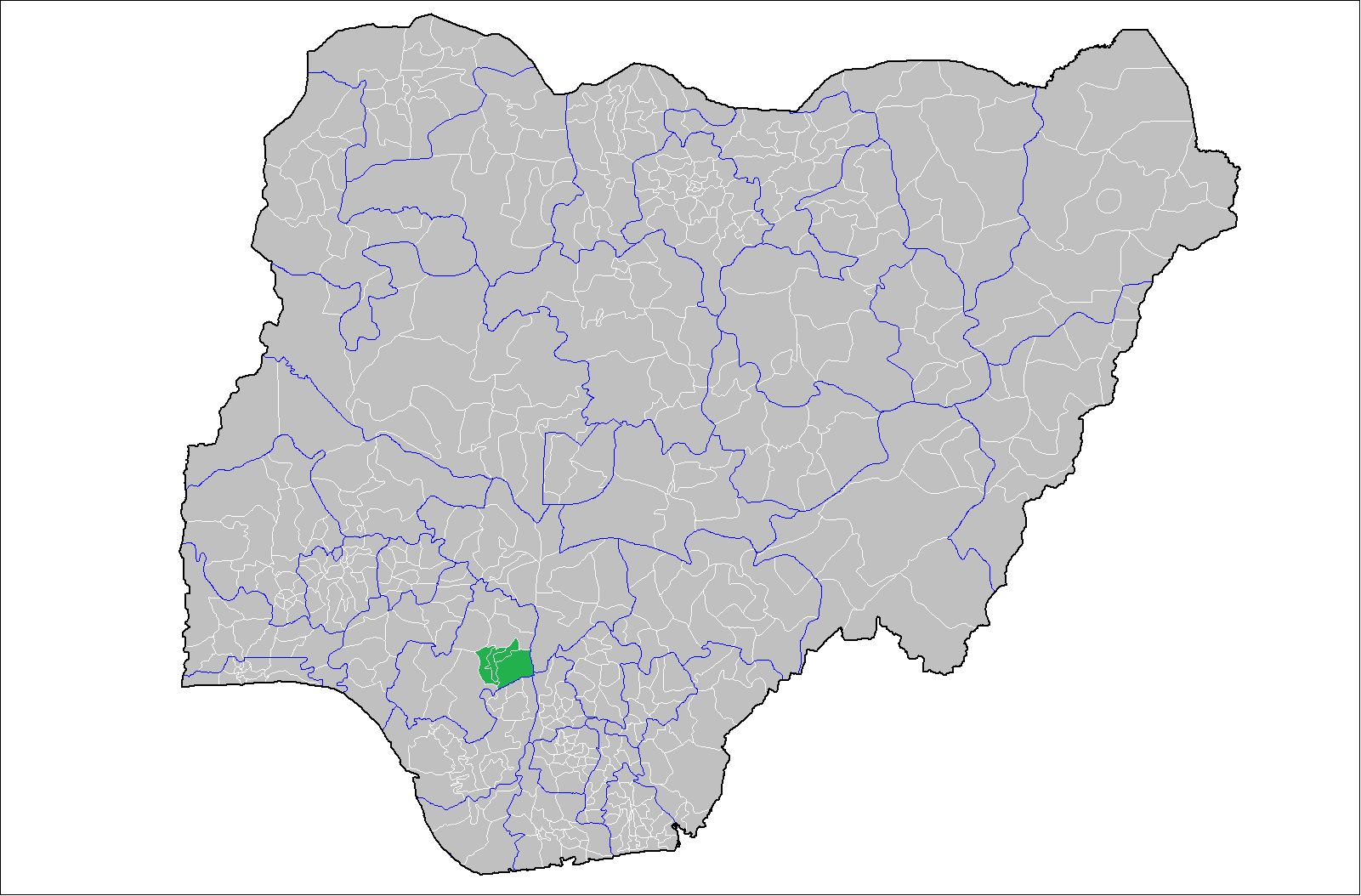
- Esanland (green) depicted in Nigeria (grey).
- Country: Nigeria
- Foundation: 1000 BC

Area
  - Total: 2,814.347 km^{2} (1,086.625 sq mi)

Population (2023)
  - Total: 900,900
  - Density: 320.1/km^{2} (829.1/sq mi)
- Demonym: Esan
- Time zone: UTC+1 (WAT)

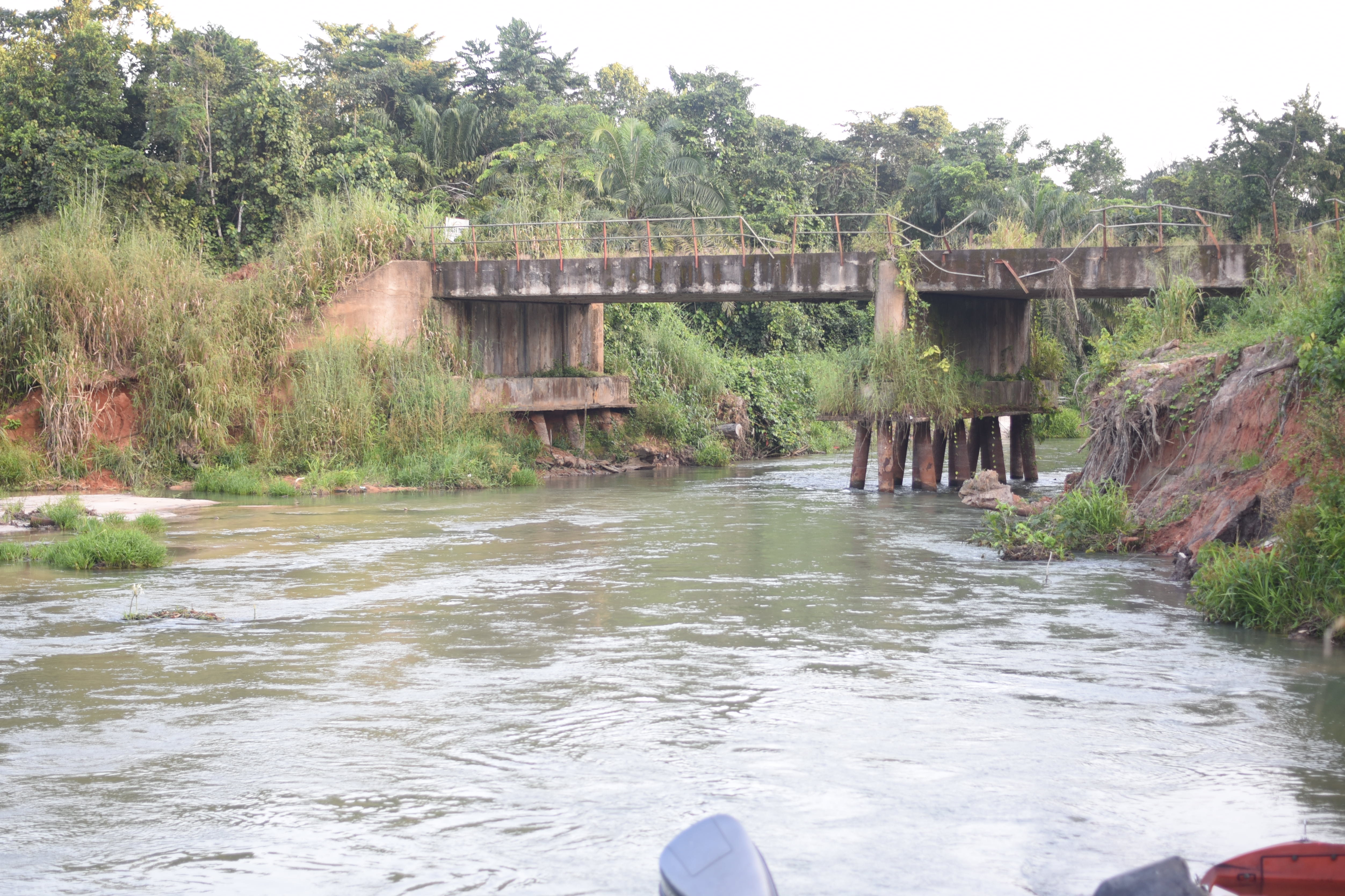
Ujiogba River

Esanland (Esan: Otọesan), otherwise known as Esan Nation, is a cultural region located in Edo State, Nigeria. It is composed of five Local Government Areas in Edo State. Esanland lies west of the banks of the Niger River. It is bordered by Kogi State, Delta State, Edo South Senatorial District, and Edo North Senatorial District. Esanland covers about 2,800 square kilometers and is home to over half a million people. The Esan people and culture of Esanland are generally homogenous.

Esanland has been inhabited since the late Iron Age, by hunter-gatherers from the Nok culture. The hunter gatherers formed a society in northern Esanland until the 12th century. In the 15th century, indigenes from the Great Benin Empire moved to Esanland and renewed Edo-Esan cultural bonds as the Benin were the Royal blood and Emperor controlling the Southern Hemisphere. Esan nations often worked either in tandem or subordination towards the Benin Empire, sending soldiers to the Benin army and treating their rulers as dukes to the Oba of Benin.

Trade with the Portuguese brought modern innovations such as Dane guns and spoons, and new crops.

Independent rule in Esanland continued into the 1800s, until the British claimed the entire region for the Royal Niger Company as part of the colony Nigeria. Local opposition to the conquest was vocal, and enijie such as King Ogbidi Okojie of Uromi banded together their soldiers in an unsuccessful attempt to fight British rule. After the British takeover, independence movements sprung up. Leaders in Esanland such as Anthony Enahoro successfully campaigned for independence, which was granted to the whole of Nigeria. Since independence, Esanland has suffered from poor infrastructure and an attempted takeover in the Nigerian Civil War by Biafra.

== Etymology ==
The term Esan has been applied to the Esan people for thousands of years, and was used before contact with Europeans. The popular believed by many historians that the name 'Esan' (originally, 'E san fia') owes its origin to Benin (meaning, 'they have fled' or 'they jumped away') is not historically correct as there is historical evidence that the term Esan has been associated to this ethnic group before Oba dynasty in Edo

== History ==
According to archaeological and linguistic evidence, humans have resided in the savannah-forest ecotone in Esanland for at least 3000 years. These people were likely associated with the Nok people and came from the savannahs in the north to the southern forests. To this day, northern Esan dialects have more in common with Northern Edo languages such as Etsako and Owan than southern Esan dialects do, which happen to be closely related with Edo. These "proto-Edoid" peoples grew yam, oil palm and vegetables, but also hunted and gathered.

Starting from 500 AD to 750 AD, these hunter-gatherers started to colonize the savannah-forest ecosystem of Esanland and the forest ecosystem of the Benin Empire. They created a pre-Esan, pre-Edo society that built advanced structures such as moats and walls around family properties. These enclosures were, at maximum, three to five kilometers in diameter, and demarcated residential and agricultural property. Those properties enlarged to become villages, and by 800 AD, these village coalesced to form kingdoms with hierarchies. Modern-day digs in the region have found that these walls were situated in the eastern Benin Empire and northern Esanland. Settlements were close to permanent springs on the northern plateau, but never next to intermittent springs.

Esanland's culture, language and growth were majorly influenced by the mass exoduses to Esan territory from all adjacent polities Communities on Esanland's southern and eastern fringes (Ewohimi, Ewatto, Ekpon, Amahor) were heavily populated by Igbos and Igalas (into Uroh); from the north came the Emai into Ukhun, Idoa, and Amahor and the Etsako into Irrua; and from the south came the Itsekiri (into Ekpon) and Urhobo (into Ujiogba).

The biggest influence on Esanland came from the Benin Empire. In 1460, Oba Ewuare passed laws of mourning that prohibited sexual intercourse, bathing, drumming, dancing, and cooking. These laws proved too restrictive for many citizens, and these citizens fled the kingdom to Esanland. This exodus shaped Esanland's modern cultural identity and gave rise to the term "Esan," or "refugee." Oral tradition has heavily supported this theory. Prominent Esan and Edo historians have collected stories about this migration.

=== Pre-colonization ===
Esan kingdoms had a varying degree of autonomy, but were ultimately controlled by the Benin Empire. The Oba approved the enijie of Esanland, and Esan kingdoms paid tribute to Benin. Yet, several wars between Esan kingdoms and Benin were recorded. This was due to the Oba, at ascension on the throne, sending white chalk to the Esans as a term of friendship. If the chalk was rejected, then the Oba would try to invade Esanland. The varying political stabilities of Benin and the Esan kingdoms also led to warfare. Such warfare was so common that there is no recorded history of peace between all of the Esan kingdoms and Benin.

Esanland was extensively involved in world trade. Benin's sovereignty over Esanland enabled it to send long-distant traders, or ekhen. Ekhen procured cloth, ivory, peppers and resources. Portugal primarily received blue cloth, or ukpon ododo from Esanland in exchange for tobacco, brandy, mirror, beads, and firearms, primarily through ekhen.

During the 16th century, the Uzea War occurred. This war was between the Uromi Kingdom and the Benin Kingdom. The war lasted from 1502 to 1503, and resulted from a refusal of friendship from Oba Ozolua of Benin by Onojie Agba of Uromi. The war ended at the town of Uzea, when both leaders were killed. However, in peaceful times Esan kingdoms would loan soldiers to the Benin Kingdom, such as during the Idah War of 1515-1516, and the sacking of Akure in 1823.

During the nineteenth century, northern Esanland was continually attacked and sacked by the Muslim Nupe people in the hunt for slaves and converts to Islam, having previously taken over the Kukuruku peoples’ lands. Many Esan kingdoms from the south helped in the battle to fend off the Nupes. The battles came into the Esans’ favor; several Nupe and Etsako warriors were brought into Esan cities where their posterity reside today. The nineteenth century brought increasing influence of Europe on Esanland, as the English demanded palm-products.

=== Esan warfare and colonization ===
Prince Okojie and his entourage.

In 1897, the British sacked the Benin Empire, effectively leaving the Esans free from British rule. In 1899, the British led an invasion into the Esan kingdoms that lasted for seven years. Esanland chose to keep fighting the British even if its neighbors fell. Fallen Benin chiefs like Ologbosere and Ebohon were still resistant to British rule inadvertently guarded Esan soil from the west, by establishing military camps and blocking roads. This lasted from 1897 to April 22. 1899, where Ologbosere surrendered at the border village of Okemue.

The first kingdom to be attacked by the British was the Kingdom of Ekpon. Ekpon launched a fierce resistance against the British invasion on April 22, which nearly destroyed the kingdom. After the near genocide of Esans at Ekpon, the kingdom of Ekpon led an ambush of the British camp at Okueme, on April 29. This led British forces to retreat, consolidate their power, and kill Ologbosere in May. Subsequent attempts by the British failed as well: conquests into Irrua, for example, led to an adoption of a guerrilla warfare strategy followed by a retreat; this method was so successful that other Esan kingdoms adopted it and the British did not invade Esanland until 1901.

On March 16, 1901, the Kingdom of Uromi, headed by the old, yet intelligent Onojie Okolo, was attacked by the British. The Uromi resistance, led by Prince Okojie, was swift and employed guerrilla warfare. After a short time, British forces overtook the village Amedeokhian, where Okolo was stationed, and murdered him. This angered Prince Okojie so much that he killed the Captain of the British troops before reinforcements were brought in. The British then realized that Uromi was nigh impenetrable without native help, and contact local sympathizers such as Onokpogua, the Ezomo of Uromi. This succeeded in napping Prince Okojie out of the forest and deported to the British offices at Calabar.

This process was duplicated in most of the kingdoms that fought with Britain: guerilla warfare was excessively used by the Esans, resulting in prolonged battle time in spite of inferior weapons, and reinforcements from Benin City for the British. Even when villages were conquered, internal resistance was fierce: continued guerilla warfare in Uromi forced the British to release Prince Okojie. However, excessive cruelty on Britain's part razed many villages and displaced many people. Finally, in 1906, Esanland submitted to British rule, and the thirty-four kingdoms became the Ishan Division..

=== Civil War ===
The civil war reached Esanland on August 9, 1967, when Biafran forces invaded and captured the entire Mid-Western Region, including Esanland. Initially, many people in the region held a neutral stance or even sympathized with Biafra; this sentiment was largely due to widespread outrage at the 1966 anti-Igbo pogroms, which also impacted Esan and other southern ethnic communities in the North. Additionally, Esanland — like much of the Midwest — had historical and commercial ties to Igboland. However, the invasion quickly changed public perceptions of the Biafran cause across the Mid-West.

After securing control over Esanland, Biafran forces enforced strict curfews and set up roadblocks to prevent a potential federal counterattack. Suspected supporters of the federal government — particularly individuals with ties to the North or the military — were arrested, and in many cases, extrajudicially executed. These killings were often based on ethnicity, with Biafran troops targeting ethnic Hausa and other northern civilians along with others perceived to have northern physiognomy. Additionally, Biafran soldiers regularly killed people with mental illnesses, accusing people with disabilities of being undercover federal reconnoiters. Biafran forces also commandeered food supplies and transportation infrastructure, disrupting the local economy and civilian life. There were also instances of forced labor, where Esan civilians were compelled to dig trenches and reinforce defensive positions.

As the occupation continued into September 1967, fear and resentment grew in the communities of Esanland. The targeted killings of prominent Esanland political and community figures by Biafran forces along with mass executions by Biafran troops of detained civilians in Ewohimi, Uromi, and Ubiaja further alienated the population. Federal troops soon launched a counteroffensive to retake the Midwest, with the goal of pushing Biafran forces back across the River Niger. By mid-September, federal forces advanced into the Mid-West, clashing with retreating Biafran units. Much like the Biafran invasion, the advancing forces portrayed the move as a liberation campaign, but the advance was marked by widespread violence against civilians. Federal troops — at times aided by Esan civilians — targeted ethnic Igbo residents and those suspected of collaboration with the Biafrans, resulting in massacres that deepened ethnic divisions. Most of the Esanland population were caught in the middle of the brutal conflict, leading some Esan leaders to attempt to negotiate with federal forces to prevent large-scale destruction. By late September, federal troops fully reclaimed Esanland, ending the brief Biafran occupation.

== Politics and government ==
Esan kingdoms were structured in a way that eguares, or cities, were headed by enijies, singular onojie. Eguares were subdivided into villages, which were subdivided into idumu or quarters. Villages and idumu are headed by the oldest man in said village/idumu, the edionwele (plural odionwere).

== Geography ==
Esanland has an area of 2814.347km². It is dominated by the Ishan-Asaba Plateau in Midwestern Nigeria. This plateau is the source of many streams in the region.

== Sources ==
- Siollun, Max (2009). Oil, Politics and Violence : Nigeria's Military Coup Culture (1966-1976). New York: Algora Publishing. ISBN 9780875867106.
