= Ubiaja =

- Town
- Location in Nigeria
- Coordinates: 06°39′35″N 06°22′56″E
- Country: Nigeria
- State: Edo State
- Local Government Area: Esan South-East
- Elevation: 221 m (725 ft)
- Time zone: UTC+1 (WAT)
- Climate: Aw

Ubiaja is a community in the Esan South-East Local Government Area (LGA), Edo State, Nigeria. It is at an altitude of 221 m. Most of the people belong to the Esan tribe, one of the major town that make up Esanland.

Ubiaja is in a rain forest region, with 1,800 millimetres (71 in) to 2,000 millimetres (79 in) of rainfall each year. The red soil is fertile and many of the people farm crops such as yam, cassava and beans, or cash crops including oil palm, cocoa and rubber.

== History ==
The date of Ubiaja's founding is not known, but the kingdom of which it was the capital was founded in 1463 by immigrants from the Benin Empire. The town is said to have been founded by a man called Edeikholor, treasurer of the Bini empire during the reign of Ewuare the Great. The name may be a variant of "Obiaza", meaning treasurer, or may come from "Obize", a type of fish that helped Edeikholor cross a stream, a fish which the people of Ubiaja still abstain from eating. Sheffield United star Ehije Ukaki was born and raised in Ubiaja.

== Geography ==
Ubiaja is a Local Government area of Edo state, Esan South East. Ubiaja local Government consist of "Okuesan", "Emu", "Ugboha", "Emunokhua", "Ikeken", "Ebhohimi" and "Ohordua". These are the communities that make up Esan South East Local Government area of Ubiaja
