= Ugboha =

Town in Edo State, Nigeria

- Town
- Location in Nigeria
- Coordinates: 6°45′N 6°28′E
- Country: Nigeria
- State: Edo

Population (1953)
  - Total: 3,003
- Time zone: UTC+1 (WAT)
- Climate: Aw

Ugboha is a town in Esan South Local Government of Edo State Nigeria. Ugboha lies on the geographical coordinate of latitude 6°45′N 6°28′E.

The correct name is Owoha. Although the population was given as 3,003 in the 1953 census, the more accurate figure is likely to be nearer 5,000 than anything else, for Eguare, Emuado, Idumu-Ihaza, Uzogbon, Inemen and Amalu without Idegun and Otokhimin have a population of 4,480 people.

== Climate ==
In Ugboha, June, July and August are the most humid and wet months.
