= Glorious Vision University =

Nigerian university

- Other name: GVU
- Motto: To Nurture for Discipline & Excellence
- Established: 2011
- Chancellor: Emmanuel Segun Awojide
- Vice-Chancellor: Professor Shegun Ezekiel Asemah
- Location: Ogwa, Edo State, Nigeria; 6°30′57″N 6°11′46″E
- Website: https://www.gvu.edu.ng

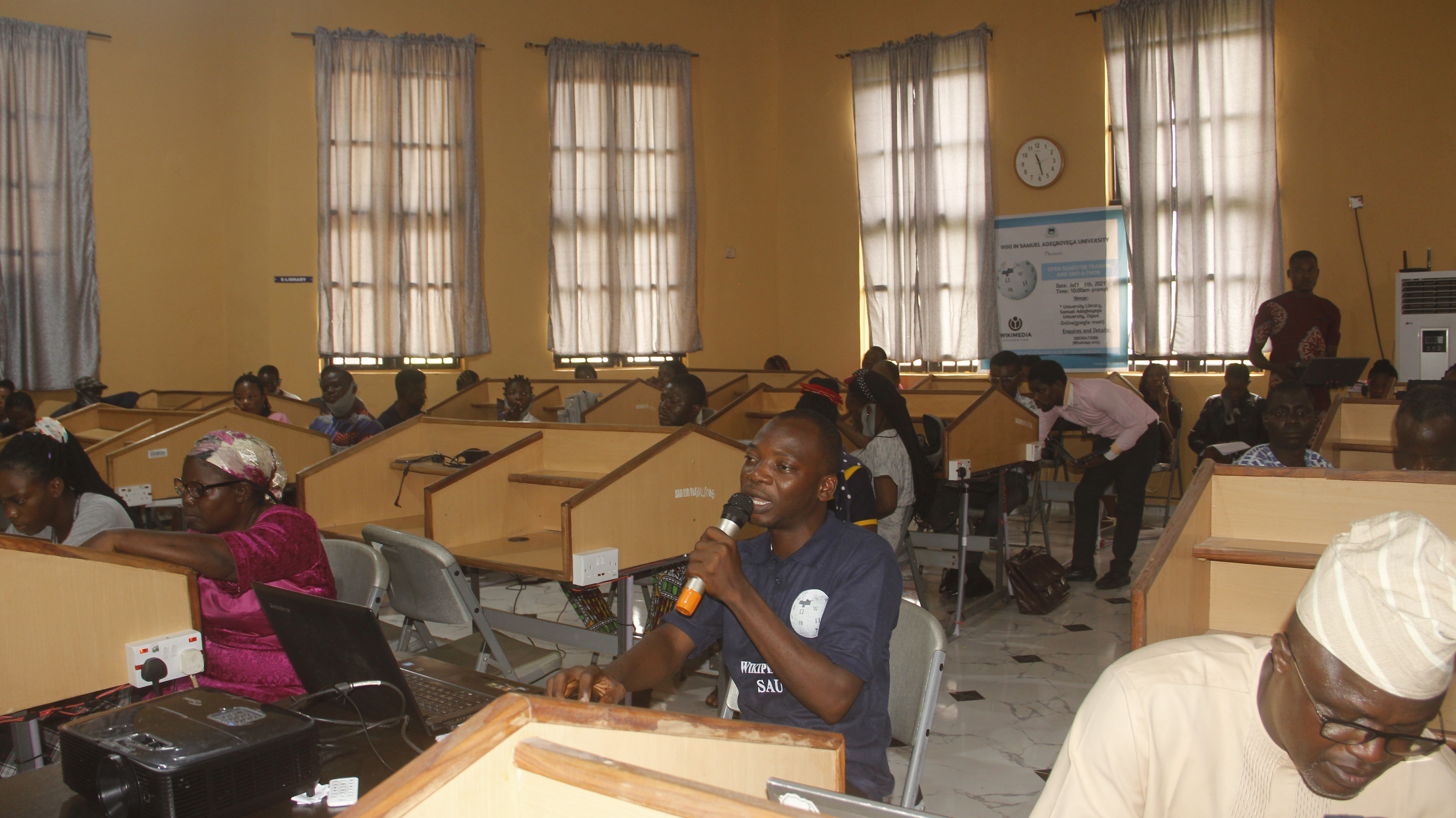
Training at Glorious Vision University

Glorious Vision University (GVU), formerly Samuel Adegboyega University is a religious University located in Ogwa, Edo State, Nigeria, West Africa. It was founded by The Apostolic Church Nigeria.

The university was named after the first Nigerian Superintendent of the church, Pastor Samuel Gbadebo Adegboyega. The institution received its licence from the Federal Government Of Nigeria on Monday, March 7, 2011, as the 45th Private University and 117th overall in the Nigerian University system. The university took off its first academic session in 2011/2012.

The inaugural class, consisting of 58 students, graduated in September 2015. In 2022, the National Universities Commission (NUC) approved the change of name request from the university. The name of the university was therefore changed from Samuel Adegboyega University to Glorious Vision University.

== Former vice chancellors ==
- Prof. Samson Adedoyin: 2011-2013
- Prof. Benard E. Aigbokhan: 2013 - 2020
- Prof. Babatunde A. Idowu: 2020-2023
