= Ekpoma =

Town in Edo State, Nigeria

- Town
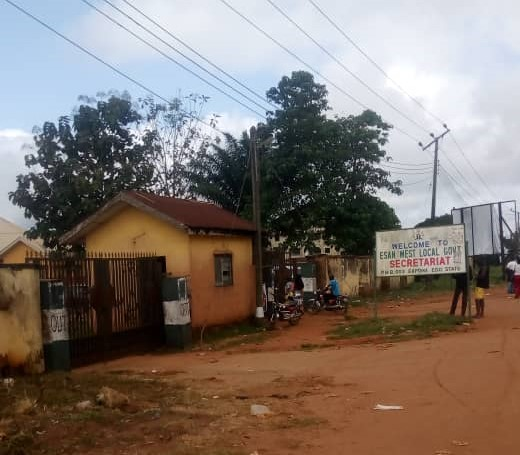

- Location in Nigeria
- Coordinates: 6°45′N 6°08′E
- Country: Nigeria
- State: Edo
- LGA: Esan West

Population
  - Total: 290,000
  - Density: 577/km^{2} (1,490/sq mi)
- Time zone: UTC+1 (WAT)
- Area code: 055
- Climate: Aw

Ekpoma is a town in Edo State, Nigeria. It is the administrative headquarters of the Esan West Local Government Area. Ekpoma lies on the geographical coordinate of latitude 6°45′N 6°08′E. The town has an official Post Office, and it is home to the Ambrose Alli University. Currently Ekpoma town is developing with major infrastructures, hospitals, schools, modern eateries and roads. The town is also secured.

== Population ==
It has a population of over 290,000 people. It has an adult male population of over 90,000 and adult female population of over 80,000. It is politically divided into 10 wards and occupies a land mass of 502 km^{2} (194 sq mi). Ekpoma along with Uromi are the prime towns of the Esan people. It has become a congregating center for years, the Esan people from other towns have consistently taken residence in Ekpoma and Uromi. Ambrose Alli University is located in Ekpoma.

== Climate Condition ==
The Raining season in Ekpoma is oppressive and over most year. the temperature varies from 63 degrees to 87 degrees.

== People ==
The people are mainly of Esan tribe, and are predominantly academic and non-academic staffs of Ambrose Alli University, owners of small scale medium enterprises (SME's), subsistence farmers and others which include civil service, trading, transportation and students of Ambrose Alli University. Ekpoma kingdom consists of 12 villages or communities with several quarters and sub-communities with Eguare as the headquarter. Though Eguare is the political headquarter of the Kingdom, Ihunmudumu is the ancestral headquarter as that's where the Otọ shrine (Alu Otọ) is located. The people of Ihunmudumu (Head town in Esan) are the once who consult the Alu Otọ. Many of these villages have been existing for centuries before they were incorporated into Ekpoma kingdom.

The people of Ekpoma speak the Esan language which is the same with the general Esan language.

The King of the town is known as or called the Onojie. This position is hereditary in which a son succeeds his father. The Onojie palace is in a community named Eguare. The village council comprises Iko-Edion, also known as the Elders, led by most Eldest in the community known as the Odionwele. The Edion are responsible for trying cases and settle disputes in the community. Messages or Information are passed from the Onojie through the Okhaimon to the Odionwele who will call a meeting of elders in order to discuss rising matters.

== Language ==
The people of Ekpoma speak the Esan language, which is related to the Etsako, Edo and Owan languages. Their dialect of Esan is very close to the general Esan which is the Irrua dialect.

== Health ==
The community enjoys a blend of traditional and orthodox medicine, with the presence of two general hospitals, some privately owned hospitals, and Government-owned health centers, and is also closely linked with Irrua Specialist Teaching Hospital, Irrua, where a lot of inhabitants visit to receive health care. Traditional bonesetters, traditional birth attendants, and herbal healers are also fairly distributed around the town setting. The caliber of staff commonly found at the health centers includes community health extension workers, nurses, auxiliary nurses and doctors. Services offered at these centers include health education, immunization, family planning counselling, treatment of minor ailments and first aid, referrals, and anti-natal.
