= Esan Central =

- LGA
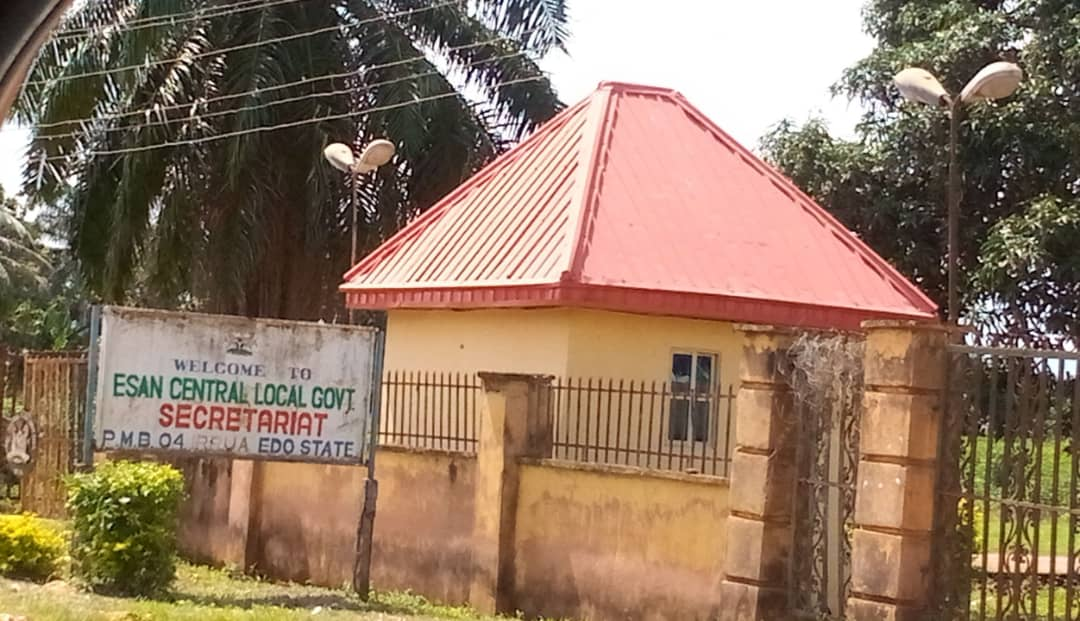
- Esan Central Secretariat
- Motto: N'Esan Gha amen!
- Interactive map of Esan Central
- Country: Nigeria
- State: Edo State

Area
  - Total: 253 km^{2} (98 sq mi)
  - Density: 545.1/km^{2} (1,412/sq mi)
- Time zone: UTC+1 (WAT)
- Postal code: 310

Esan Central Local Government Area is a Local Government Area of Edo State, Nigeria. Its administrative headquarters is located in the town of Irrua.

The postal code of the area is 310. It has an area of 253 km^{2} and a population density of 545.1/km^{2} [2016]

== Towns and villages ==
Irrua, Idumebo, Idumabi, Ewu, Opoji, Usugbenu, Eidenu, Adenu, Ugbalo, Ibore, (Uneah comprises Ibore, Atuagbo and Ugbalo) Unogbo, Idumoza, Ugbegun, Imokano, Afuogbo, Okharomi, Equare, Atuagbo Ujabhole, Ibhiolulu, Udomi, Afuda, Idumoza, Ohe, Idumoghodor, Ehenwen, Idoa, Uzokholo, Ehanlen, Eko, Ekori, Eko, Idunwele, Ugbokhare, and Ekilor to name a few.

== Climate ==
Esan Centra has two weather conditions which are wet and dry climates with high temperatures and humidity. The rainy season normally starts from April to October with heavy rainfall between June and September. The dry season usually start From November to march. The temperature are high with annual temperature of approximately 27 °C (81 °F).

== Health facilities ==
The Irrua Specialist Hospital, Otibhor Okhae Hospital, Irrua, Edo State, the School of Nursing and Midwifery, Public Primary Health Centers, public and private hospitals such as the Zuma Memorial Hospital. Clinics and maternity homes.

== Location ==
Esan Central is located at latitude 6.73634° N and longitude 6.21984° E, Nigeria.
