= Irrua =

Town in Edo state, Nigeria

Coordinates: 6.739°N 6.219°E

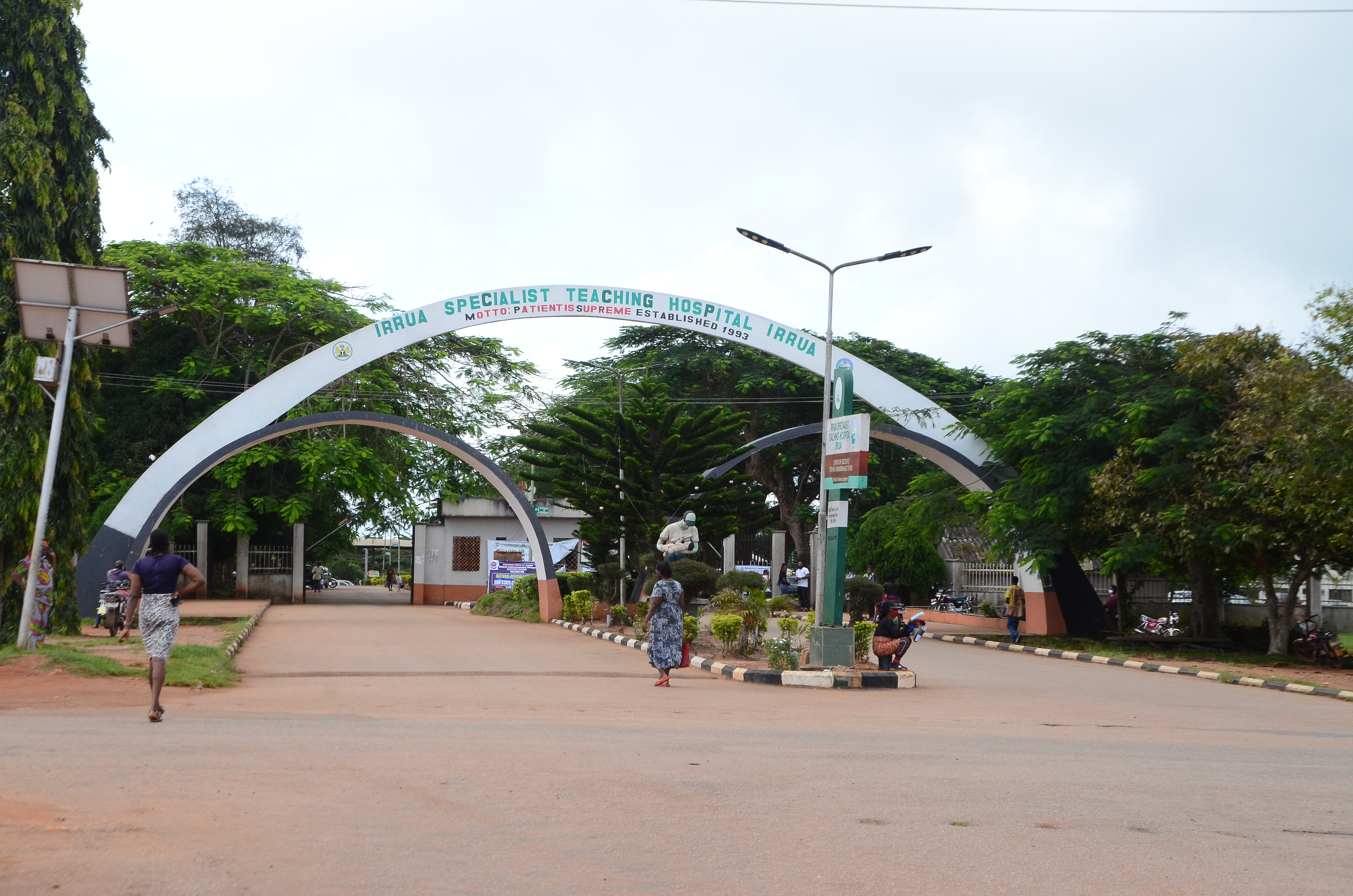
Irrua Specialist Teaching Hospital Main Entrance

Irrua is a town in Edo state and the administrative seat of the Esan Central local government area in Edo State Nigeria. Irrua was established by decree 92 of 1993 (Appendix I) to provide tertiary services to people of Edo State and beyond.

== History ==
It came to have this name on the arrival of the ruling house. Before this time, there were primitive settlements of Akho and the quarter today marked by Idunekhakpozi. The proud assertive immigrants from Benin settled in Eguare, close to the people they found. The domineering attitude of these strangers coupled with the inherent desire to please the newcomers on the part of the aboriginal settlers, made these first settlers move forward tody pe Opoji, leaving a handful of the more virile and stubborn type which is still represented today by Idunekhakpozi. Remnants of these people have almost been swallowed up by Uwenujie Eguare, but identifiable are the late Eranga Irabo, Akhidue, father of Egbele the palm wine tapper, Aboiralo and Ijiekhumen now in Idumebo. Irrua was known to be Irriowa, it was now changed when they found home and where they are satisfied to Iriuwa and much later Uruwa, and later had its final metamorphosis when the white men dealt it a final blow, reducing it to Irrua.

== Religion ==
Irrua has three major religions: Ebor; Islam; and Christianity.Christianity being the predominant religion. Islam was introduced in the early 20th century.

== Notable residents ==
- Augustus Aikhomu
- Christopher Okojie
- Sunny Okosun
- Monday Okpebholo

== See also ==
- Irrua Specialist Teaching Hospital
