= Jattu =

Jattu Ikpe Ikpe Uzairue
- Location in Nigeria
- Coordinates: 7°05′N 6°17′E
- Country: Nigeria
- State: Edo State
- Postal code: 312102
- Climate: Aw

Jattu is a town in Edo state Nigeria. It is the headquarters of Uzairue Clan in Etsako West council of Edo state. Uzairue Clan consist of twenty-one (21) villages, namely Jattu, Afowa, Elele, Iyamho, Ogbido, Uluoke, Ayaoghena, Ayua, Iyuku, Imeke, Afashio, Iyora, Apana, Imonikhe, Yelwa, Ozor, Ikabigbo, Idatto, Ugbenor, Irekpai, and Ayogwiri. Jattu is bounded by Auchi, Afashio, Elele/Iviamho, Ayua, and South Ibie.

Jattu is a prominent town in Etsakoland; with a large population of Etsako people as residents.

Notable locations in Jattu include the Palace of the Ogieneni of Uzairue, Jattu New Market (arguably the largest market in Afemailand), St. Philips Catholic Church, Utukwe Market, St James the Great Anglican Church, Central Mosque, Notre Dame Catholic hospital, NTA Uzairue, Jattu Grammar School, General Post Office and Divisional Police station.

The villages and quarters within Jattu are; Okotoukwe, Iyano, Iyogbe, Iyeate, Iyeremhe, Iyegbefue, Venus Quarter, Iyowha, Newsite and Ikoyi Quarters.

The people of Jattu speak the Ikpe language in the Uzairue dialect. They are mainly Christians, Muslims, and traditionalist. Jattu played a vital role in the migration of AFEMAI people from Benin Kingdom as it believed to be their first abode when they left in search for freedom.
