= Hussein Mustapha Lecky =

Nigerian politician

Chief Whip of the Edo State House of Assembly

Member of the Edo State House of Assembly
- Incumbent
- Assumed office June 2023
- Constituency: Etsako West I

Personal details
- Born: May 14, 1983 (age 43) Edo State, Nigeria
- Citizenship: Nigerian
- Party: All Progressives Congress
- Occupation: Politician

Hussein Mustapha Lecky (born 14 May 1983) is a Nigerian politician serving as a member of the Edo State House of Assembly, where he represents the Etsako West I constituency. A member of the All Progressives Congress (APC), he was elected in March 2023 and serves as the Chief Whip of the assembly.

== Political career ==
=== Election ===
Lecky contested the Edo State House of Assembly election for the Etsako West I constituency in March 2023 as the candidate of the All Progressives Congress (APC). He won the election and was inaugurated into the assembly in June 2023.

=== Legislative activity ===
Following his inauguration, Lecky was appointed Chief Whip of the House.

== Personal life ==
Lecky was born on 14 May 1983 and is from Edo State, Nigeria.
