= Agbede, Edo State =

Town in Edo State, Nigeria

Coordinates: 6.6781°N 3.5149°E

Agbede is a town in the Northern part of Edo State. It has been in existence since the 13th century. The inhabitants are predominantly Muslim. It is the door way into the North of the State.

== Geography ==
The town has several villages also referred to as Ayuele clans. It includes; Jagbe, Odigie, Egono, Ubiane, Ughiole and Egho. Agbede is bordered by Ewu, Idoa from the South and Auchi to the North. The main stay of the community is farming. Agbedes are famous for producing the unique staple cereal crop called Agbede Rice. The inhabitants of this geography also farm yam & cassava. They are blessed with the most arable flat land surface for agricultural production.

In terms of the weather, there are majorly two seasons; raining and dry season accompanied by harmattan.

== History ==
The Agbedes were the original makers of the artifacts in Benin before their exodus into the northern part of the geography called Edo State.

It is also said that the first Agbedes were originally Unemes. Another school of thought holds that Agbedes and Unemes were blessed with creativity in approaching arts.

The Agbede people can be called Agbedes (Anglicization). But, they call themselves in their language, Gbede.

=== Precolonial Agbede ===
Agbede is an ancient community. In precolonial times, it was the area through which iron was smelted for the Benin Empire warriors. The Agbedes and unemes were the Benin empire smelters. There is a school of thought that says Unemes are Agbede Ayuele and Agbedes are Unemes. The only difference is their geographical spread and linguistical alteration. Agbedes/Unemes were also blacksmiths for the Nupes.

=== Relationship with empires/kingdom ===
==== Benin empire ====
The Agbede Kingdom was then kukuruku (Edo north) administrative headquarters of Benin Empire. Jacob Egharevba in his classics succinctly put it clearly that "the headquarter of the colony or province of the old Benin empire in Kukuruku was Agbede." Agbede was also the administrative headquarters of the Nupe empire in Kukuruku/otoesan. Agbede Ayuele country's king, Oba Abdullahi (successor of Oba Momodu) served as the Head of kukuruku until he handed over to Otaru Momoh and he offered prayers for him.

Agbede established trade, social and Islamic education relationship with the following enviable historical empires

1. Ilorin Emirate

2. Kano Emirate

3. Kogi kingdom (probably igbira)

4. Benin Empire

5. Bida Emirate of Nupe Empire

== Agbede Ayuele contribution to Islamic education ==
Agbede concentrated fully on establishing itself as a center for traditional Islamic Education & thoughts.

The strong ties between Agbede kingdom with the Etsu Nupe and Bida Emirate paved way for the introduction Muslim scholars from Bida for Islamic theology on the town. They first settle at Agbede and are later sent to places in Kukuruku to enable Islamic learning. Shaykh Bawa amongst others was an example. He was sent to Auchi to enable Islamic learning. He became the chief Imam.

Agbede have always sent Scholars of Islam of Agbede or northern origin to aid Islamic understanding in different areas of Edo.

Agbede Kings were also reported to have directly asked for scholars from a kingdom in Kogi due to their relationship, it was easy for a scholar to be sent down to Agbede.

Agbede prided itself as the center of learning where Muslims and new Muslims come in groups around Afenmai (Kukuruku) and Esan to study Islam. Since the foundation for Islamic scholarship was well established and all encompassing, the sent Muslims studied to their fill and went back to become Imams and Mallams of their various towns and villages. They not only aided learning, they spurred further the growth of Islam in their societies.
