= Etsako West =

- LGA
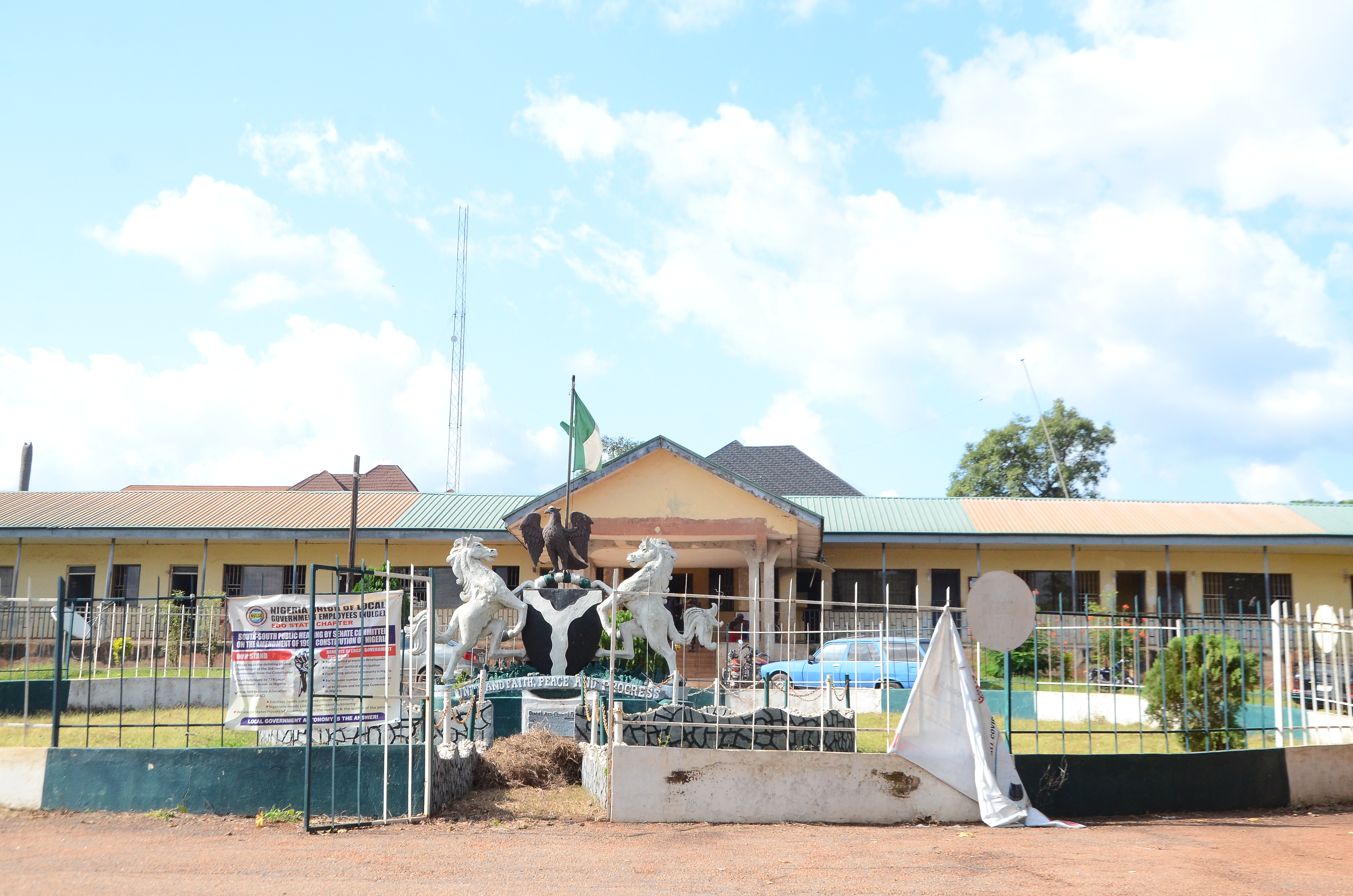
- Etsako West Local Government Area Secretariat
- Interactive map of Etsako West
- Country: Nigeria
- State: Edo State
- Capital: Auchi

Area
  - Total: 946 km^{2} (365 sq mi)

Population (2006)
  - Total: 197,609
  - Density: 209/km^{2} (541/sq mi)
- Time zone: UTC+1 (WAT)
- Postal code: 312

Etsako West is a Local Government Area of Edo State, Nigeria. Its headquarters are in the town of Auchi. Etsako West is made up of six clans: Uzairue, Auchi, South Ibie, Anwain, Jagbe and Aviele.

The major towns in this LGA includes: Auchi, Jattu, Agbede, Ughiole, Odighie, Egho, Ubiane, Iyamho, Iyuku, Ayogwiri, Apana, Iyora, Afowa, Afashio, Ikabigbo, Irekpai, Ogbido, Ayaoghena, Ikholo, Uluoke, Ugbhenor, Idato, Ayua, Imeke, Elele, Sabo Iyakpi, Ibienafe, Ughieda, Iyerekhu, Egbogio, Jagbe clan (Ikhwa, Imiokono, Inhianmhen, Imogian) and Awain clan (Ewora, Idegun, Ama, Ibhioba).

The Agbedes were originally the makers of the artifacts that are seen in Benin. There was a threatened elimination of the Agbedes in Benin, which led to the evacuation of the Agbede people from the Benin Kingdom.

== History ==
The first king of Agbede was — Oba Momodu, the 1st of Agbede, who was not educated, but was assumed to be or endowed with the knowledge of various Languages; who was also the first Muslim King in the area now known as Edo State. He could speak many languages even though he had no schooling in these tongues. It is said that he began to pray and act like a Muslim, years before he came across Nupe and Hausa Mallams in his community, Ayuele Country of Agbede.

Oba Momodu the 1st who ruled from 1890-1912 was unique in many ways, so say the accounts. He was the Oba of Agbede in Edo State, and could speak countless languages. But he was never taught any of these tongues, some of which were European languages. This has both puzzled and impressed many people over the years.

== Geography ==
It has an area of 946 km^{2} and a population of 197,609 at the 2006 census.

It also has the Prestigious Federal Polytechnic attended by students all over the state.

The postal code of the area is 312.

== Climate condition ==
The climate of Etsako West is tropical wet in some areas and savanna dry in others. With year-round high temperatures and heavy humidity, the climate is distinguished by two distinct seasons: a lengthy rainy season and a shorter dry season.
