= Johnson Suleman =

Nigerian pastor and televangelist (born 1971)

Apostle Johnson Suleman
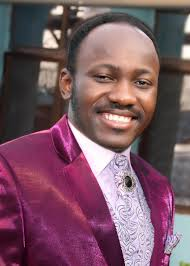
- Suleman c. 2012
- Born: Johnson Sule; March 24, 1971 (age 55); Benin City, Edo State, Nigeria
- Education: University of Benin
- Occupations: Pastor, televangelist
- Website: apostlejohnsonsuleman.com

Johnson Suleman (born Johnson Sule; 24 March 1971) is a Nigerian televangelist and the senior pastor and general overseer of Omega Fire Ministries International, a church with its headquarters (Restoration City) located in Auchi, Edo State, Nigeria. After working as an assistant pastor in the Armor of God Church in Lagos from 1998, he started Omega Fire Ministries in 2004.

He identifies fellow Nigerian pastor Enoch Adeboye as his "spiritual father".

== Early life ==
Suleman was born Johnson Sule on 24 March 1971, to Mrs Esther Sule and Hon. Imoudu Sule. He has a younger brother, Dr Sule Emmanuel, who was formerly a pastor in the South African branch of Suleman's Omega Fire Ministries International.

Suleman had his primary and secondary education in Auchi.

According to Suleman, he grew up under the tutelage of the late Benson Idahosa prior to the formation of Omega Fire Ministries International. He has an informal father–son relationship with Ayo Oritsejafor, having previously submitted under his ministry.

== Criticism and controversy ==
Suleman has faced criticism for his public statements on the Nigerian government and its agenda. He is regarded as a "controversial" religious figure.
