= Idoa, Nigeria =

Esan community in Edo State, Nigeria

Idoa Community
Idoa (Odoa)
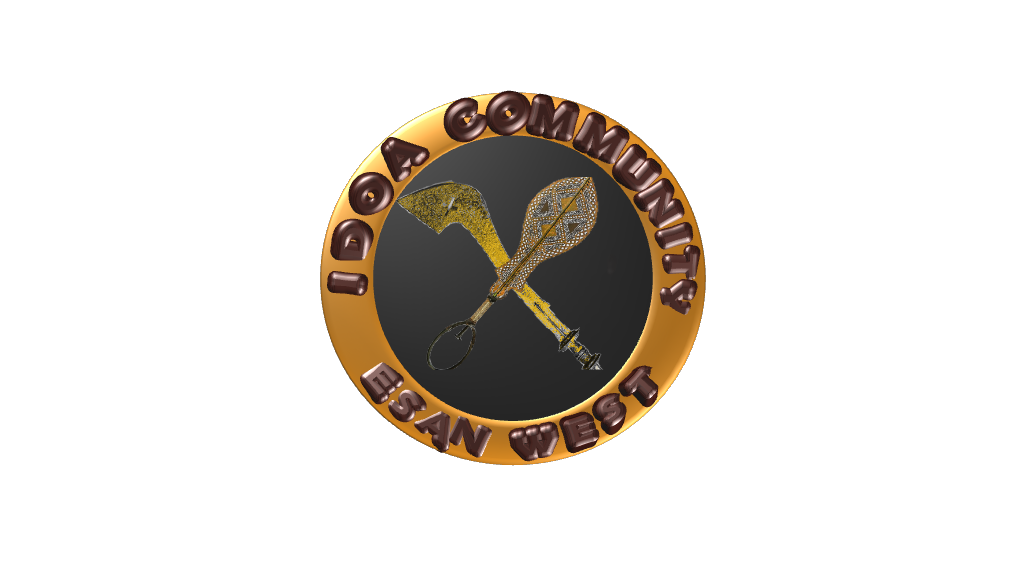

Total population
- c. 500,000

Regions with significant populations
- Nigeria: 170 million

Languages
- Esan and English

Religion
- Christianity; Islam; Traditional African religion

Related ethnic groups
- Esan, Idoani

Idoa is an Esan community in Edo, Nigeria. The city, an Esan tribe, stretches through the highlands and plains of central Edo State. It is 120 kilometres north of Benin City, the capital of Edo State, having boundaries with Ekpoma in the west, Ukhun in the south, Ewu in the east and Agbede in the north. Residents are primarily farmers, cultivating various crops, including yams, rice, cassava, taro and cocoa. The city of Idoa is currently made up of the following five clans: Afuku-N'Edo, Afokolo, Atologua, Ubi and Ofie.

== Religion ==
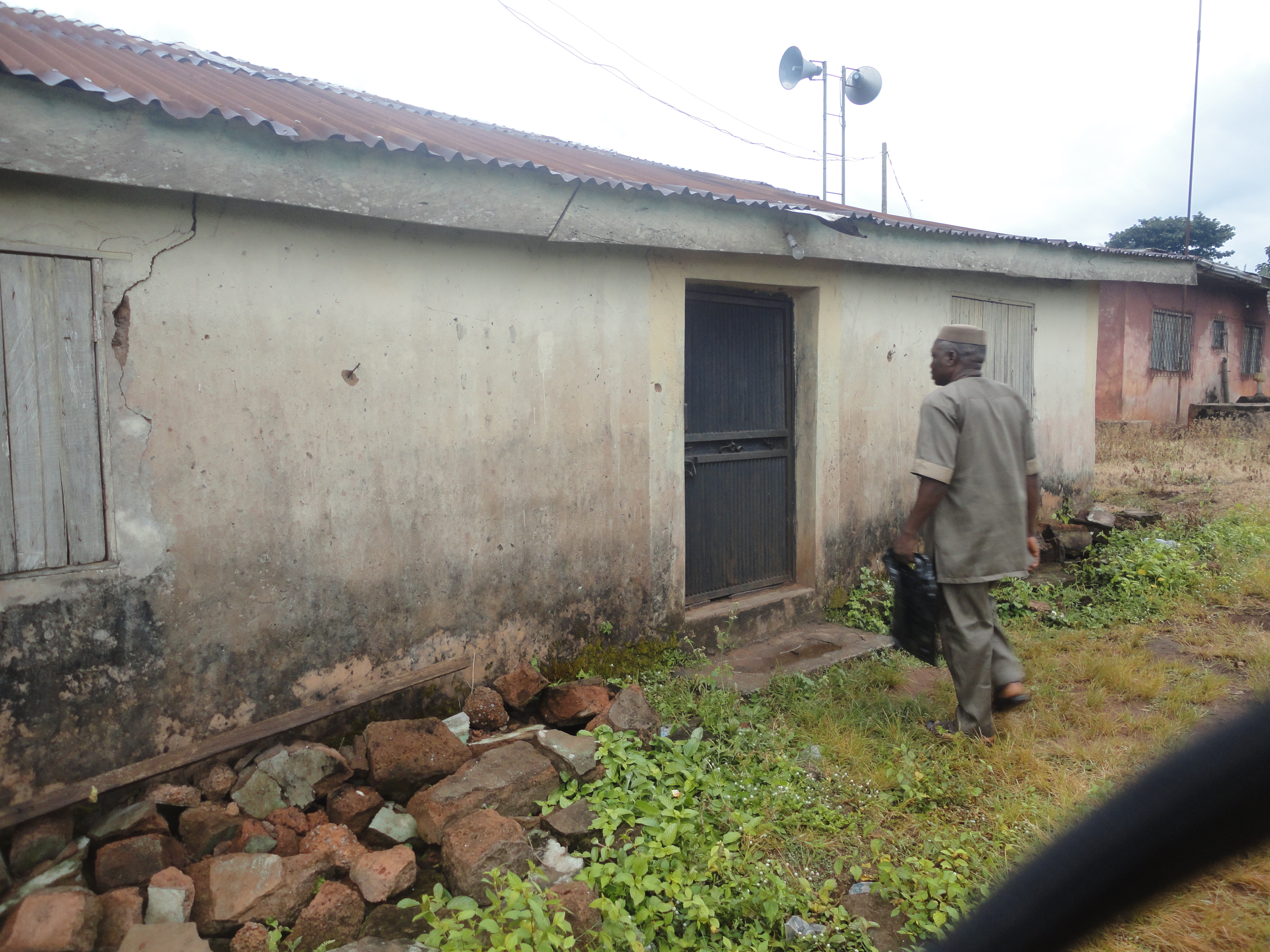
Idoa mosque

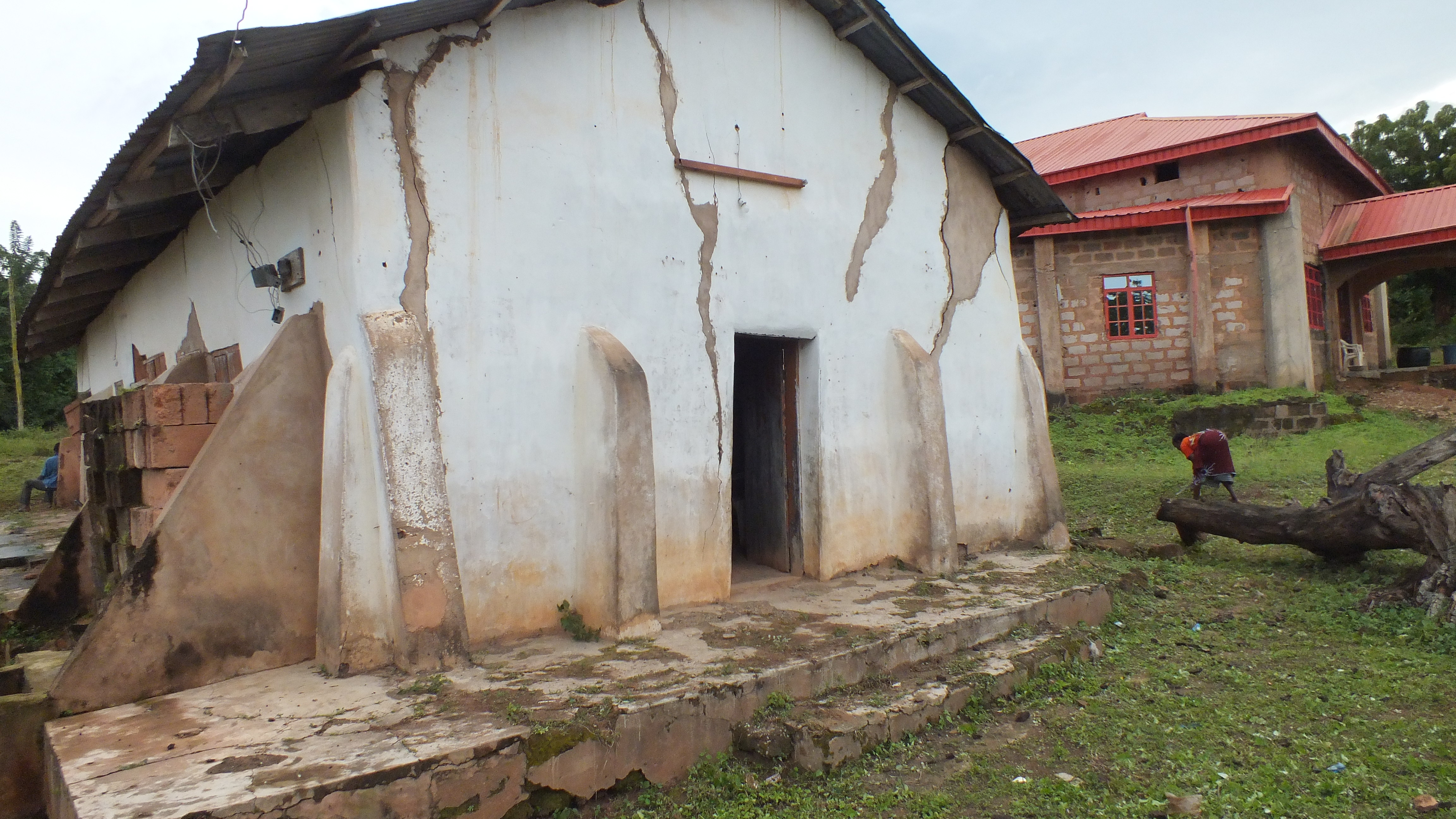
St Peters Anglican Church, Idoa

Idoa people were originally herbalists. During the reign of Ifidon in the late 1890s, Islamic Religion was introduced to the community with the assistance of Oba Momodu I of Agbede. The first mosque was built in 1918. Today, Islam, Christianity and other religions are present in the community

== History of Idoa Kingdom ==
In 1460 AD, Oba Ewuare passed laws of mourning that prohibited sexual intercourse, bathing, drumming, dancing, and cooking. These laws proved too restrictive for many citizens, and these citizens fled the kingdom to Esanland. This exodus shaped Esanland's modern cultural identity and gave rise to the term "Esan," or "refugee." Oral tradition has heavily supported this theory. Prominent Esan and Edo historians have collected stories about this migration.

During this migration it was said that three brothers, Ojie-Ekpende, Udah, and Ojieosan, left Benin and moved towards the north side called Ukukuruku. Udah stayed at Ekunma (Ekpoma), and told his brothers and their followers to move further. He told them that Ojie-Ekpende is stronger than Ojiesan, and ordered that the weaker should stay closer to him while the stronger should move further with his men (meaning Ojie-Ekpend should move further). Among them was Okolo, the father Ojie-Amen. However, Okolo could not get to Idoa land.

Among Ojie-Ekpende's companions was his wife, Urabi. They settled in this land but later discovered that a group of people were already living there. With Edo people all over the Edo Region he was respected by his group and those he met. Ojie-Ekpende's people were Ojie-Amen, Oghodor, and Okokhun. These men had wives except Ojie-Amen, who lost his father on their way to Odoa. Some months later Ijiekhea, also from Edo, traced his friend Ojie-Ekpende to the land of Odoa. Ojie-Ekpende gave birth to four sons and a daughter by names: Ebe-Ehirakha-Okogimen, Enabohifor, Okpikhor, and Ailmonka while the daughter was named Udumen.

Some say that the warrior by name Ijie-Akhea founded Atuogwa and Ofie, though some said that he came with a brother, Ofie.

== Festivals in Idoa Community ==
In all of Esan land, festivals are carried out periodically. They are a means to encourage social interaction and to promote unity among the people.

Iluoror Festival, also called the New Yam Festival, is held in February every year and dates back to the beginning of the community. It is held to mark the beginning of the planting season, to appreciate the gods for the success of the last year's planting season, and to appease the gods for strength for the next planting season in ancient times. The first meal is ihihea and it is eaten either with water or yams, after which every household pounds yam and slaughters animals like goats, rams, and cows depending on their financial position. From there, everyone goes to the palace for display of traditional dance according to their groups.

Ilukpe festival

The Ilukpe festival is a thanksgiving festival held annually in June. In this festival, sons and daughters offer thanksgiving to their late fathers. This is normally done on the "eke" (ize) market day. Every first son of the family slaughter's a goat while the woman slaughter's a hen. In a polygamous house, the first son of the late man has to slaughter the goat and send the right leg that contains the tail to the eldest living uncle, while his or her younger siblings will do the same to him. The meat is used for cooking.

Ihaelen Otu (age group naming ceremony)

The Ihaelen Otu Festival is a festival held when the community deems necessary as an initiation into adulthood. The ceremony is carried out to give names to youths in Idoa community that have come of age. Once named, these youths (now classified as adults) are entitled to the same rights as all other adults.

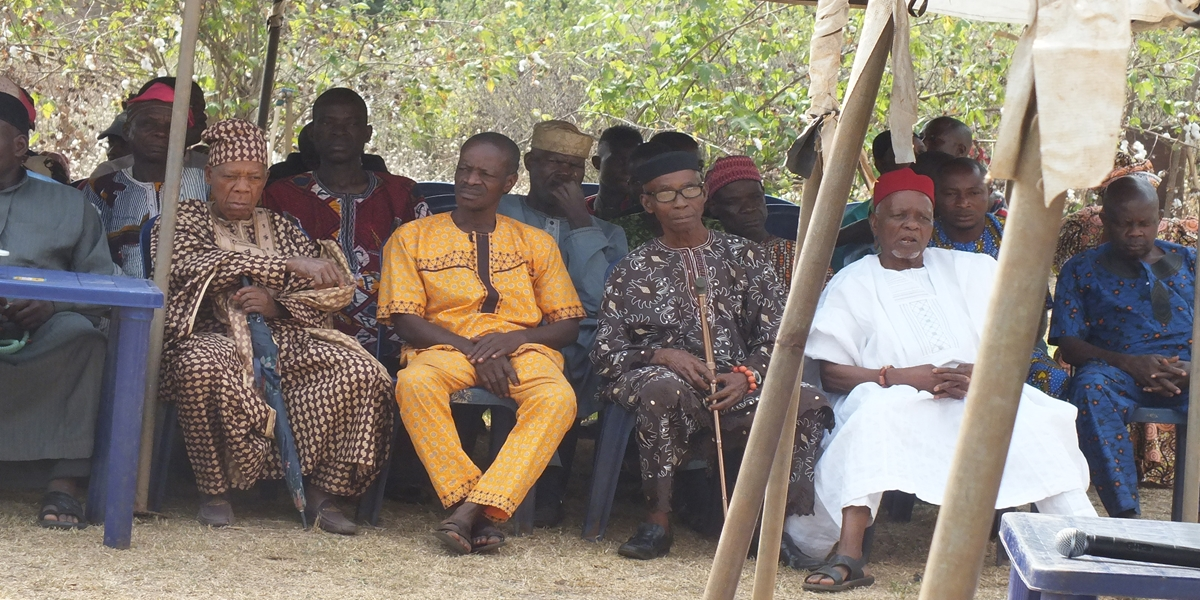

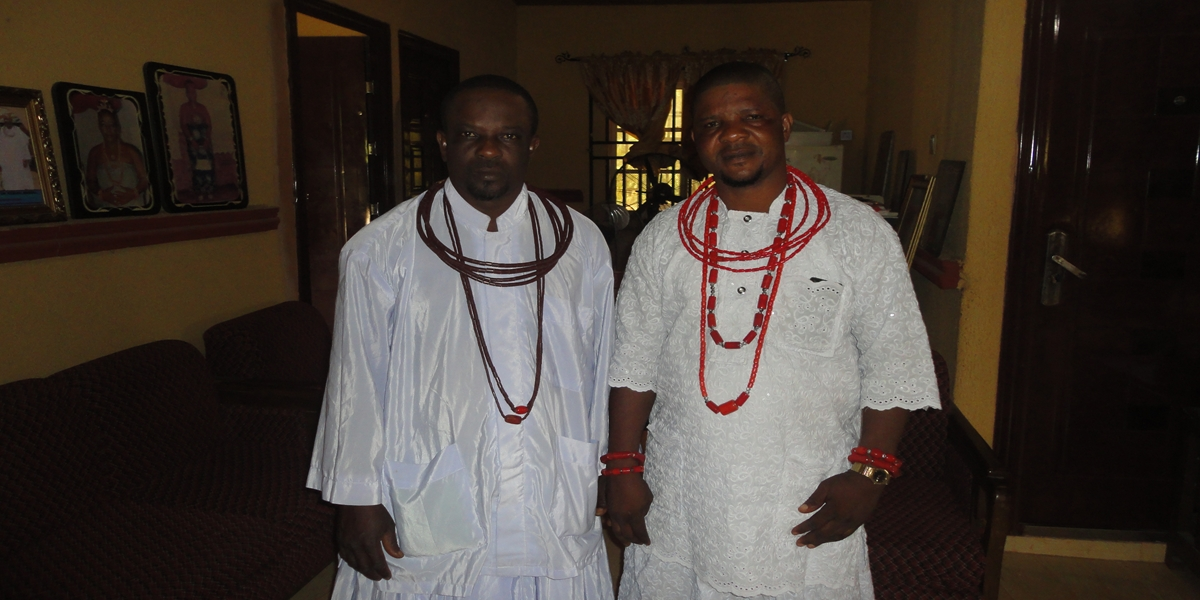

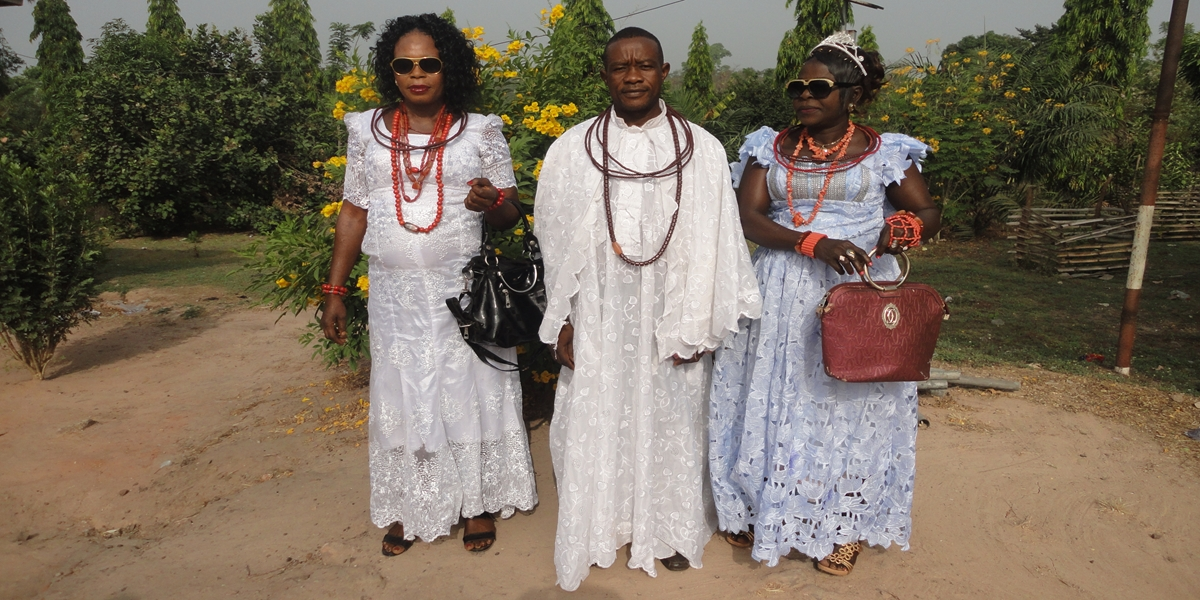

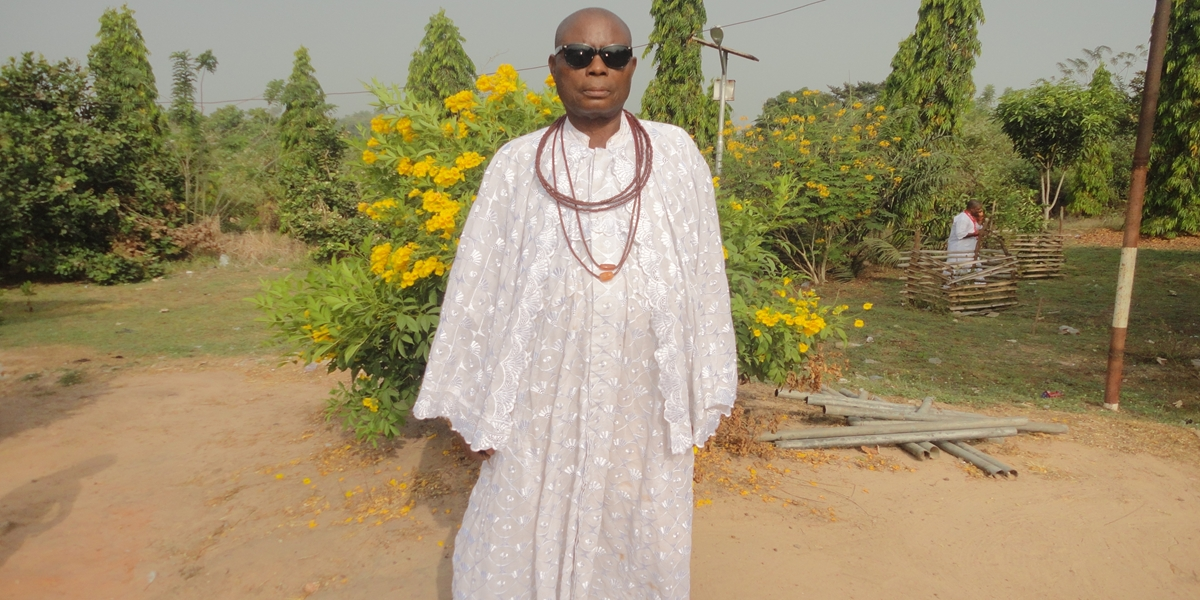

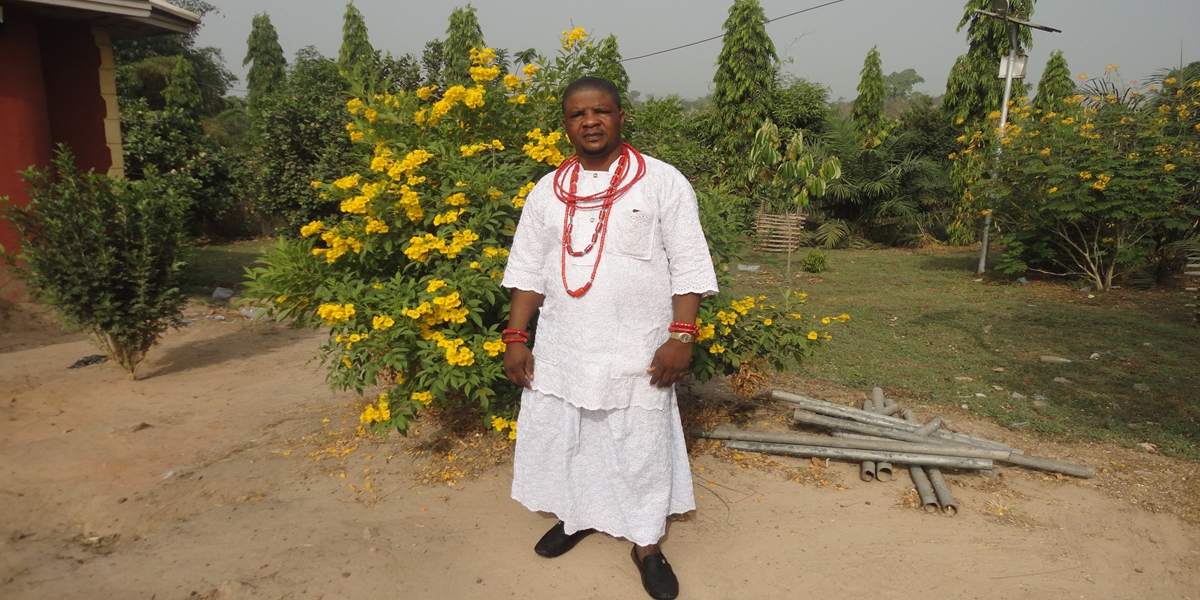

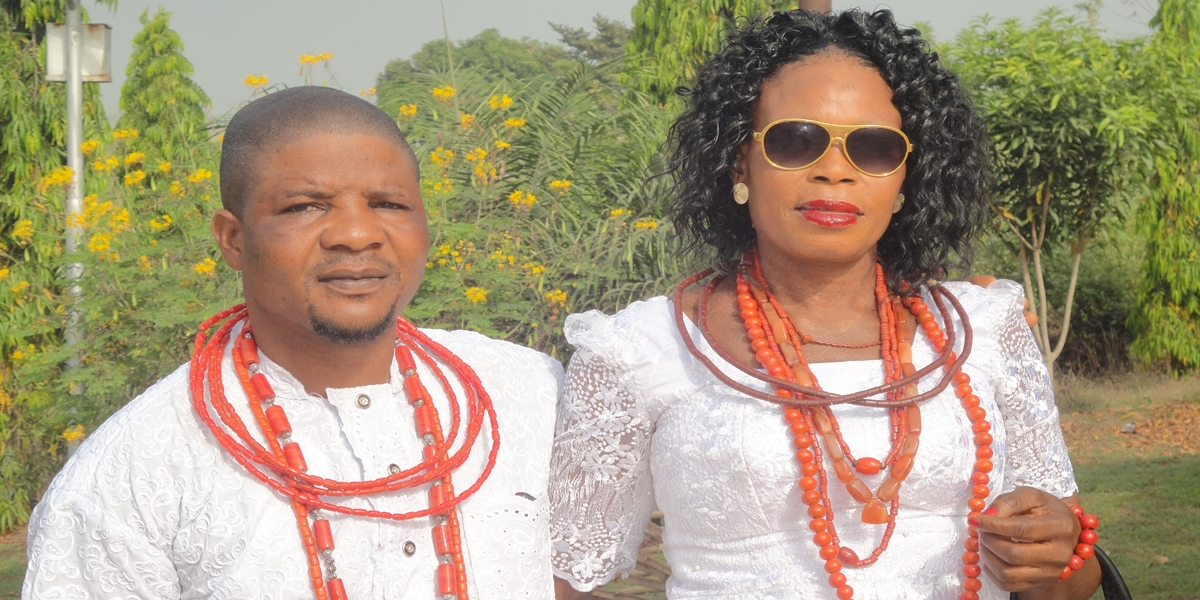

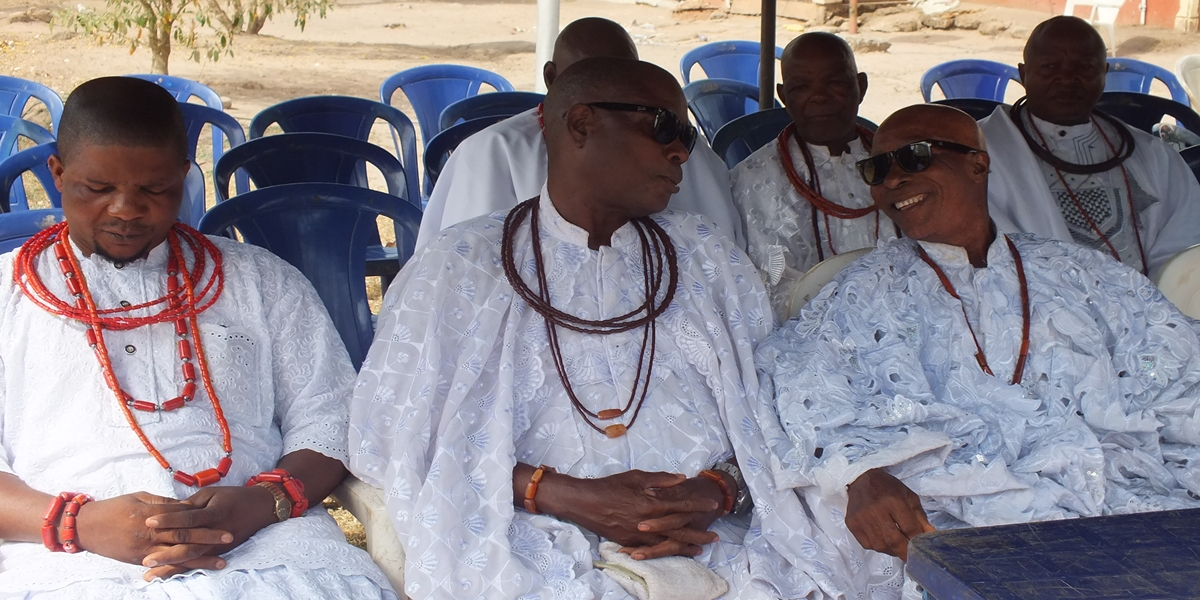

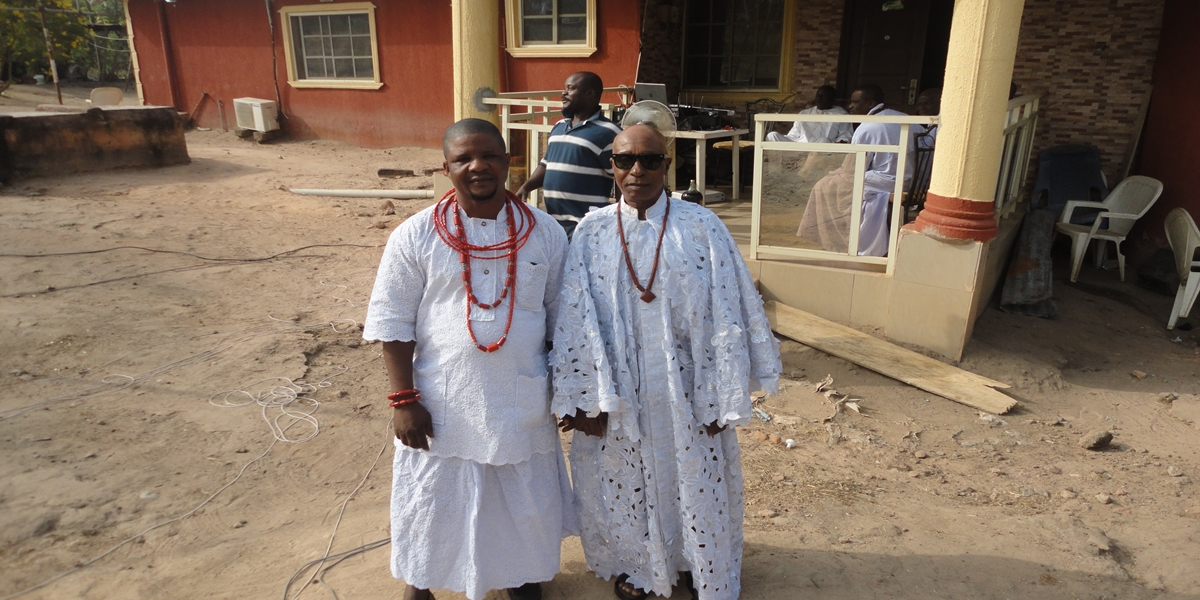

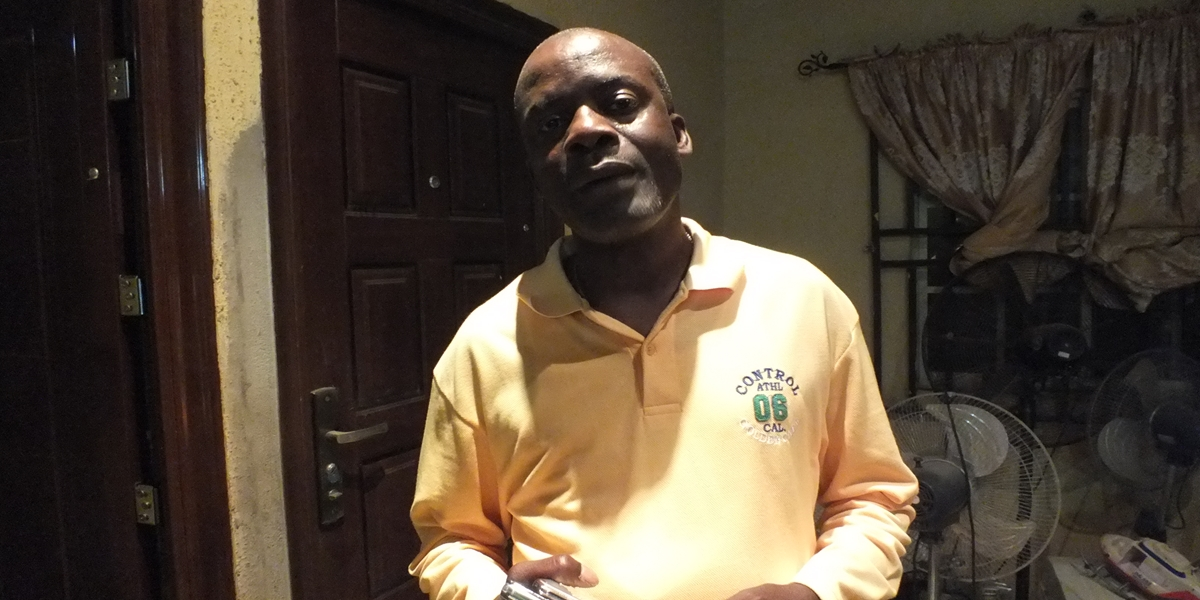

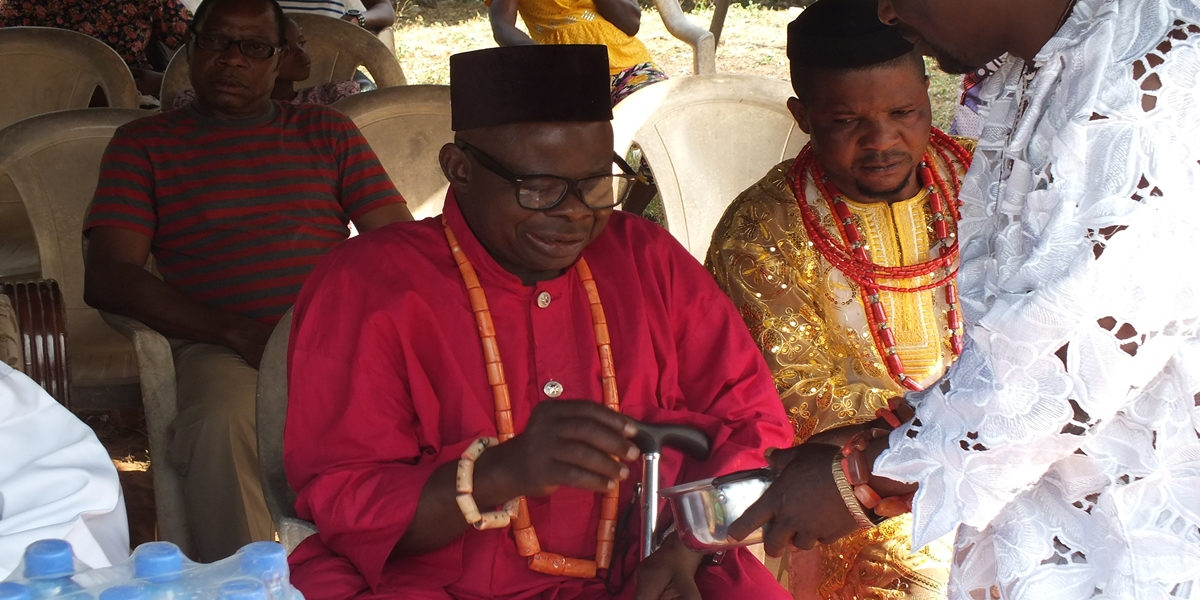

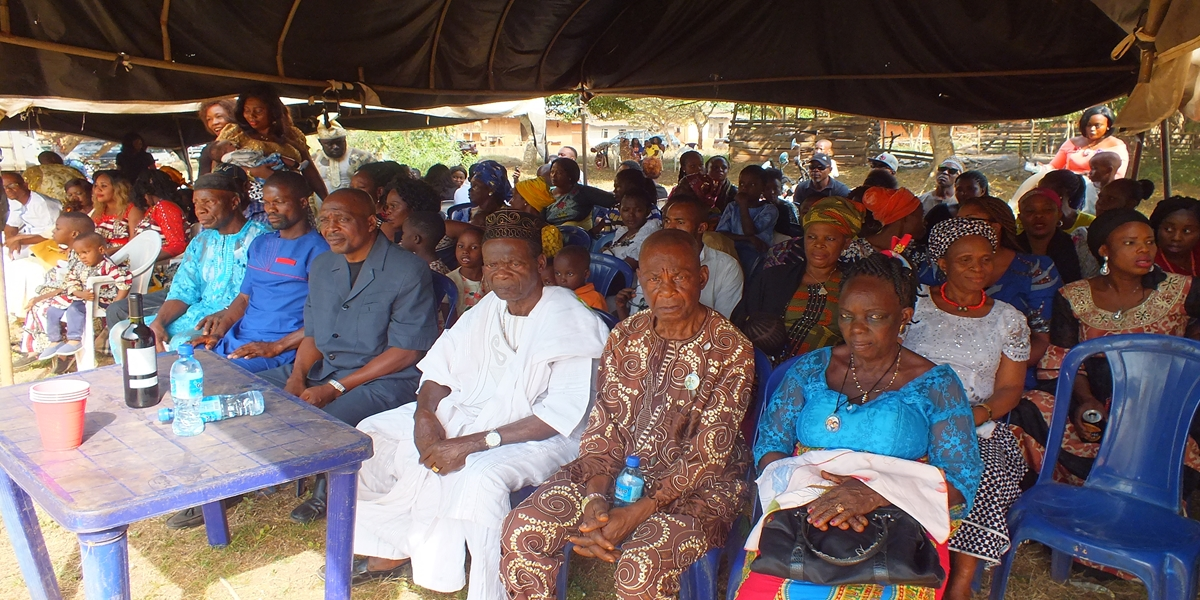

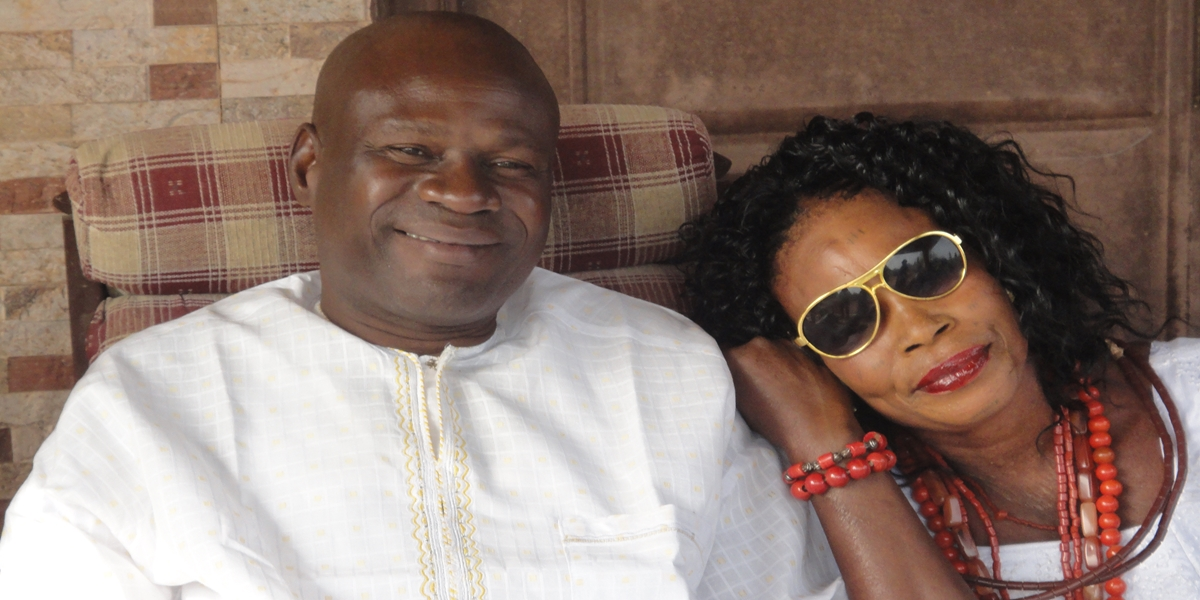

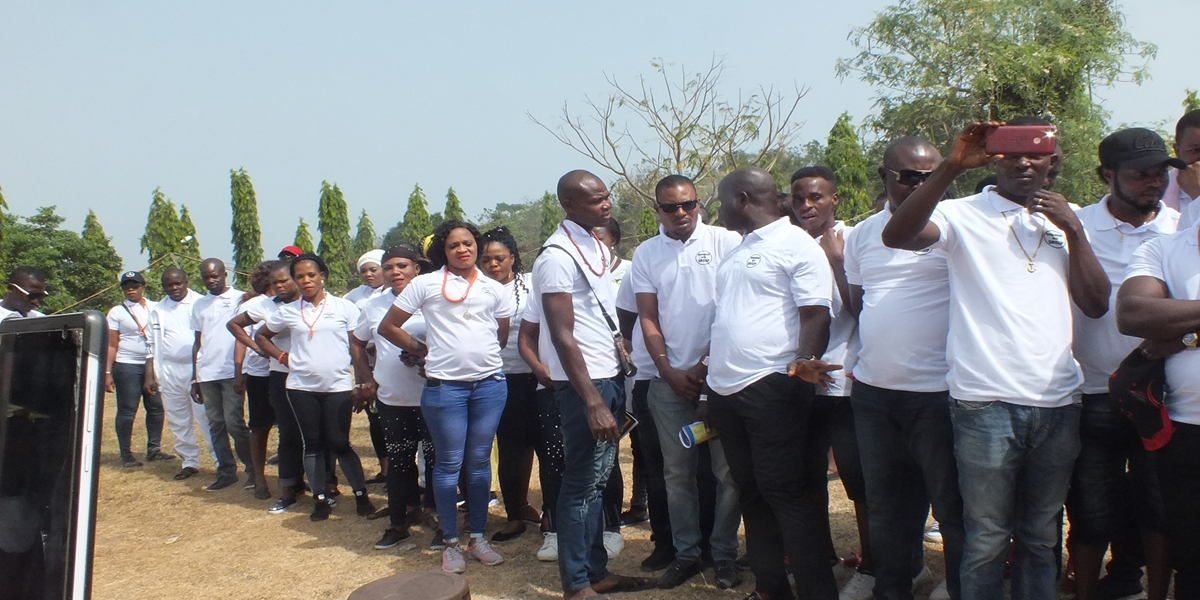

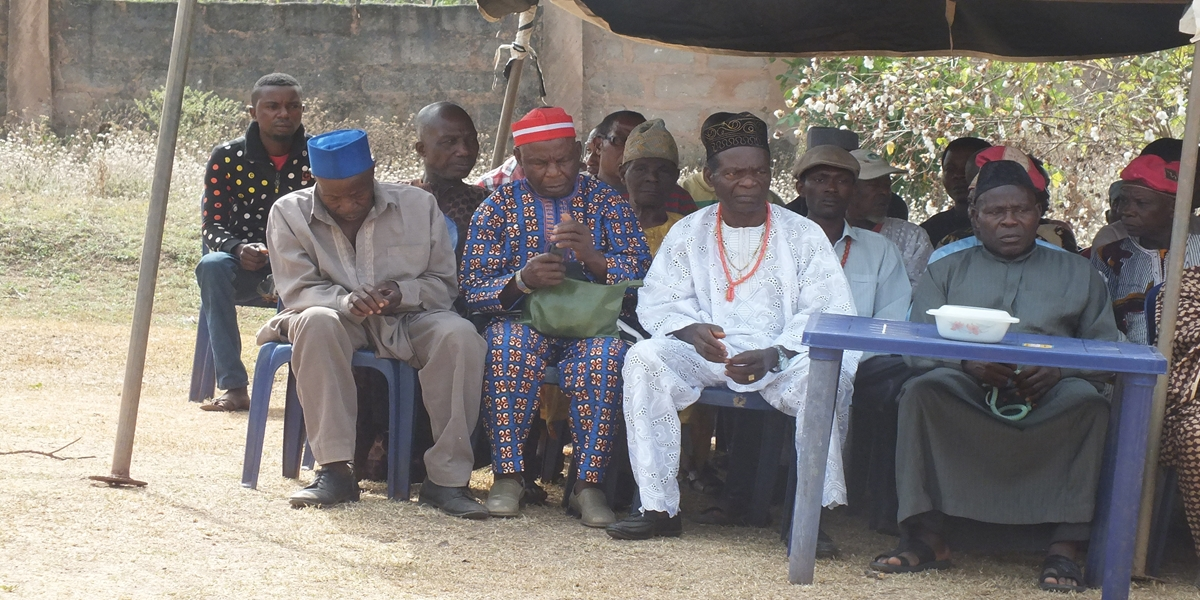

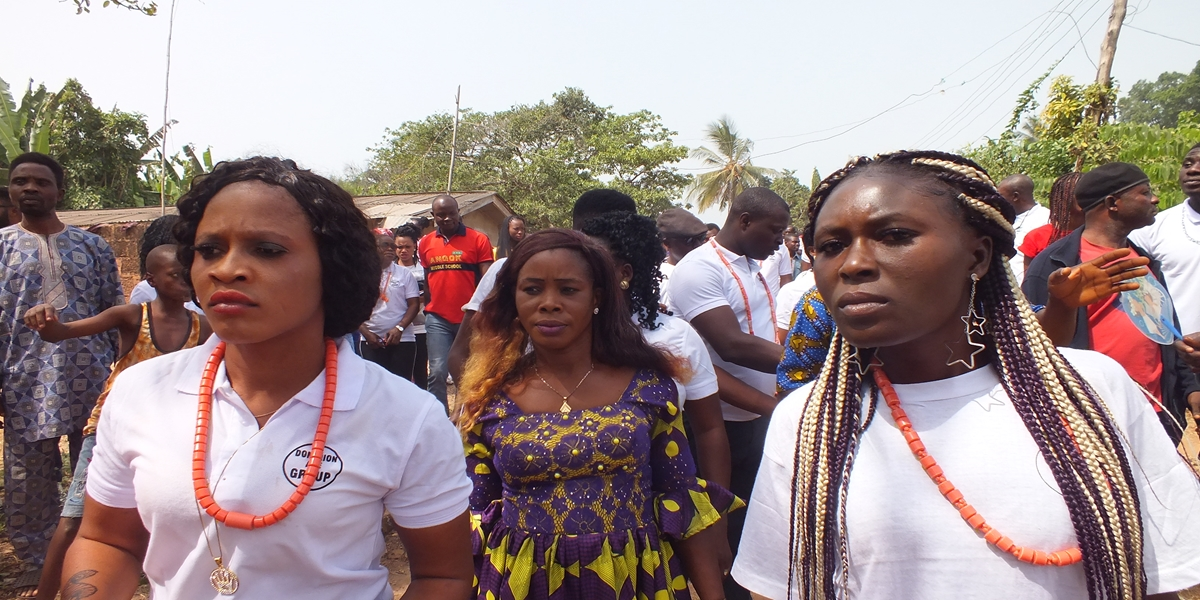

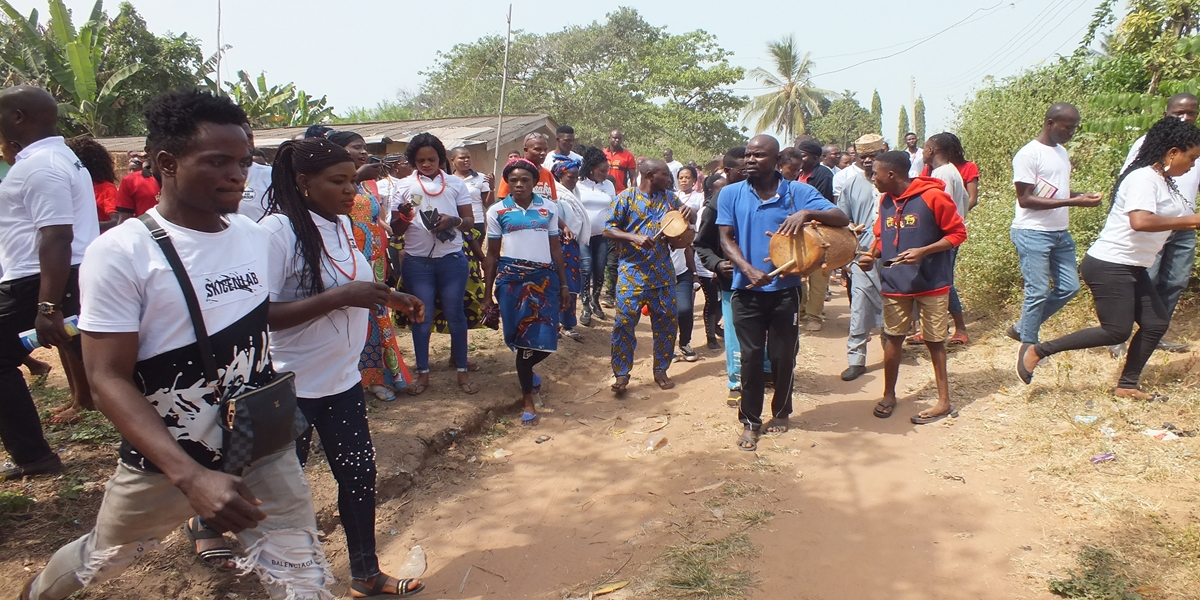

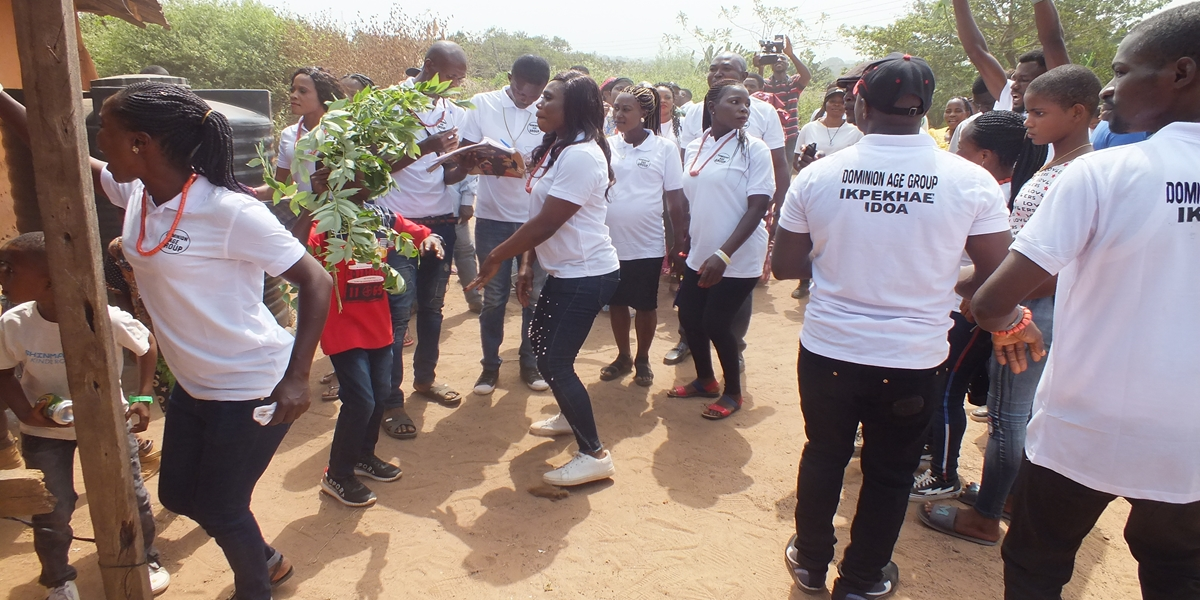

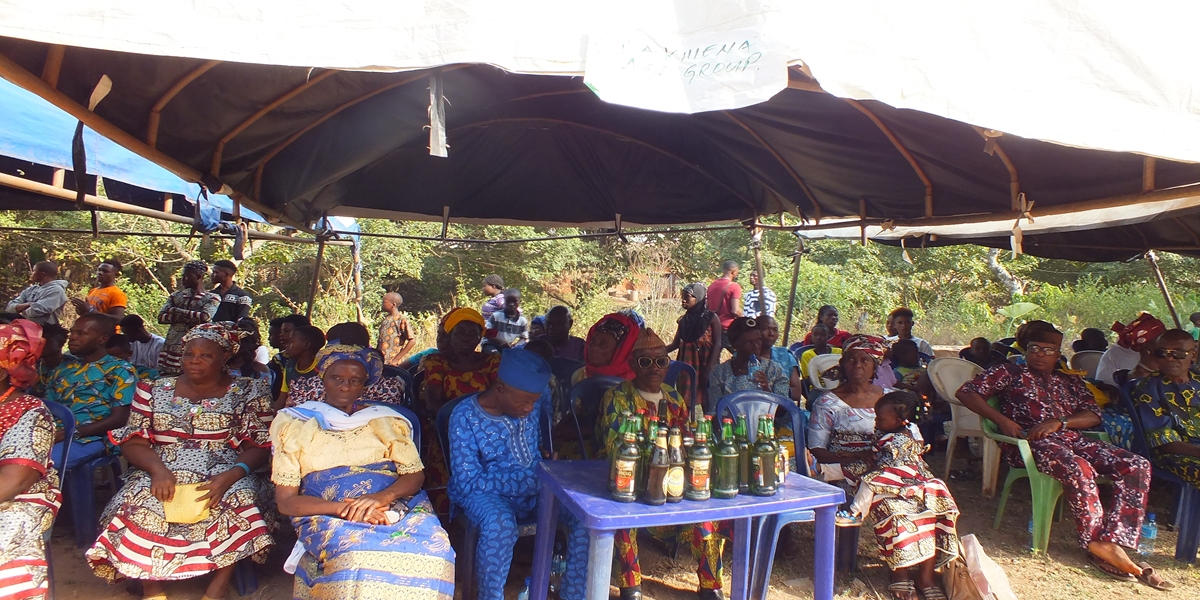

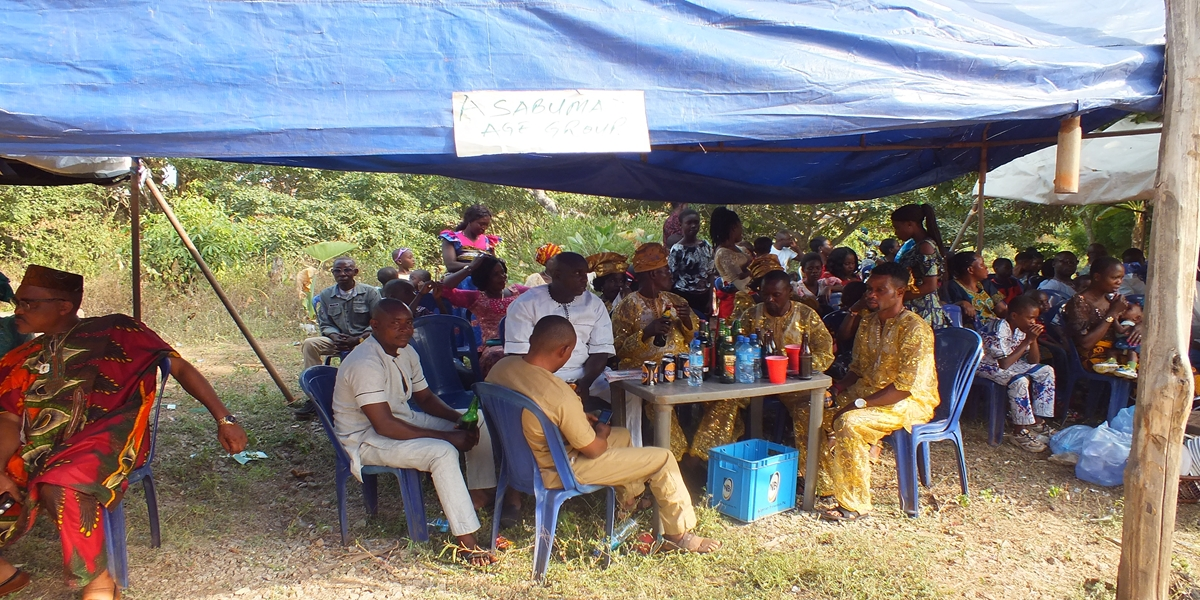

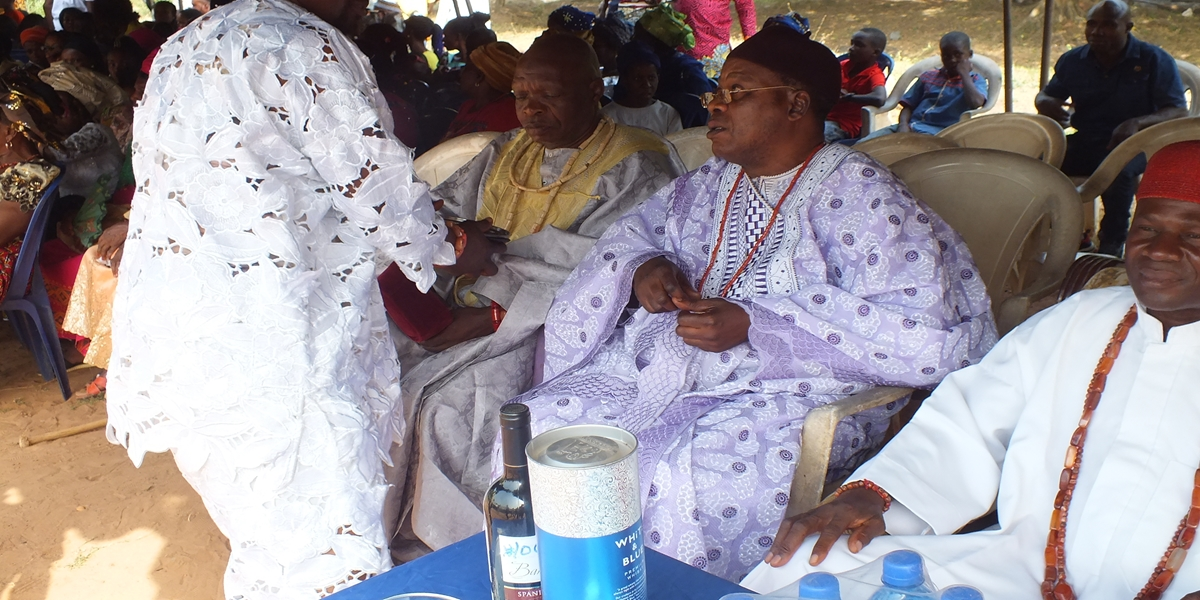

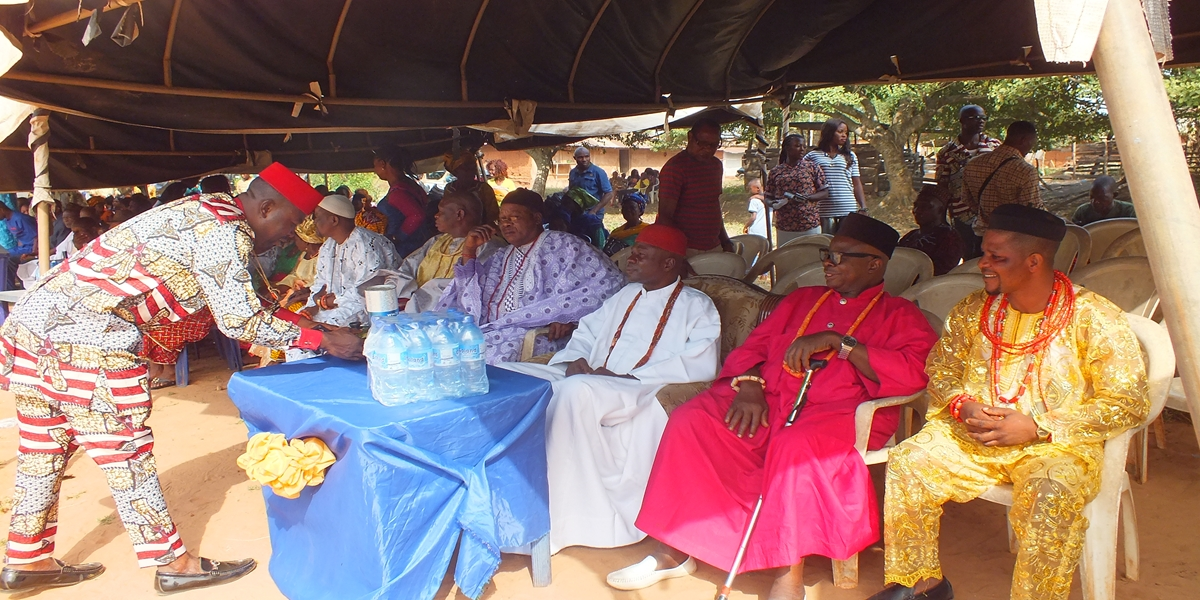

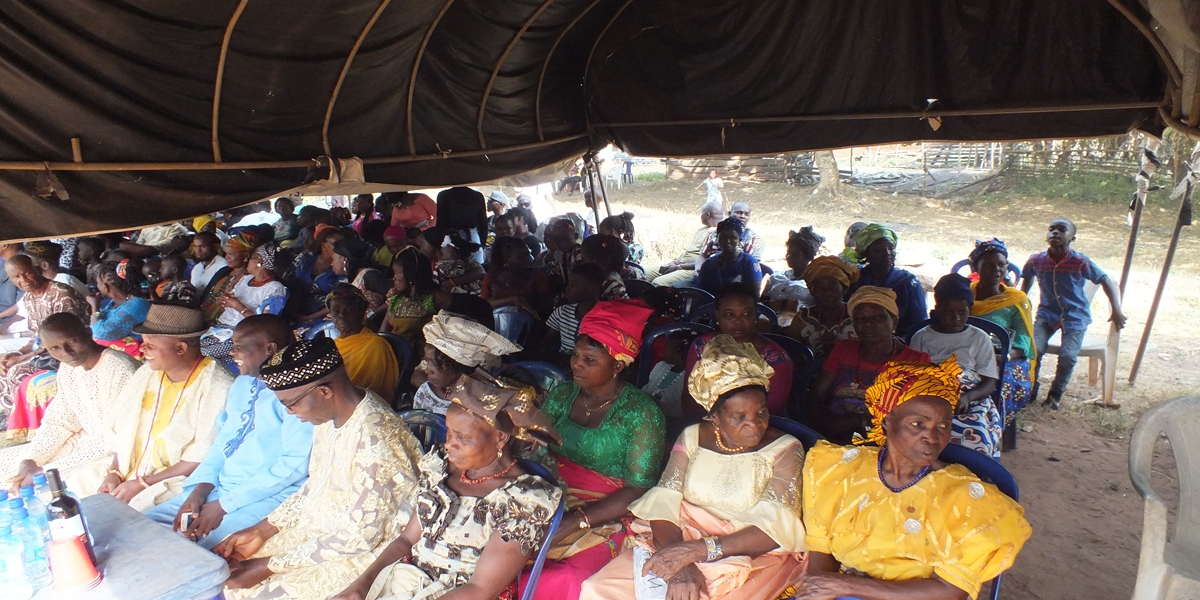

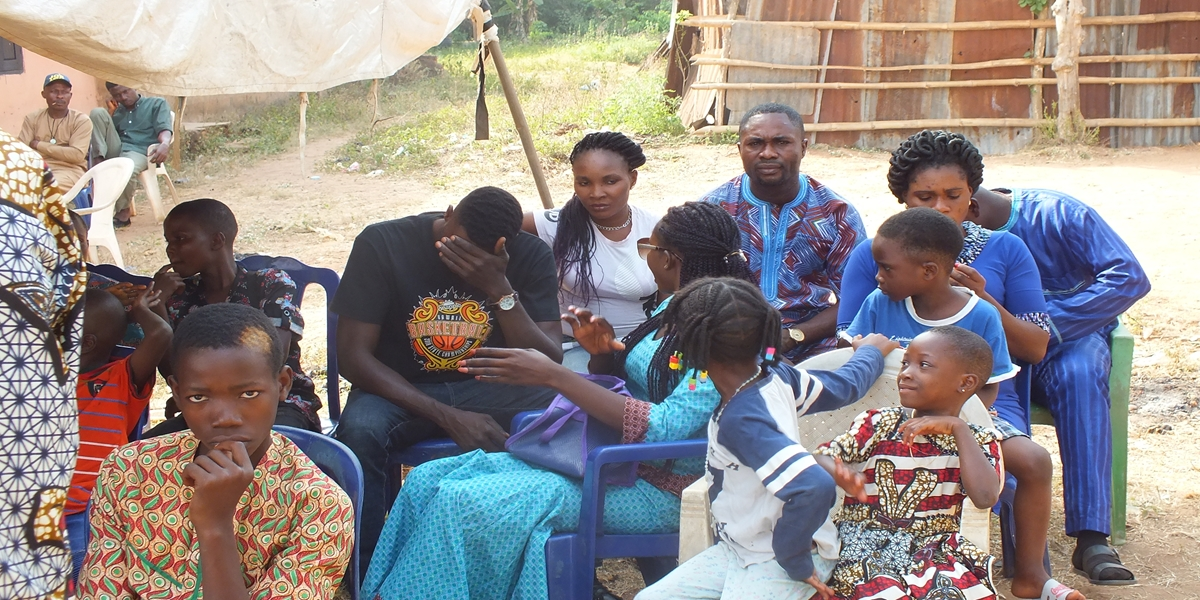

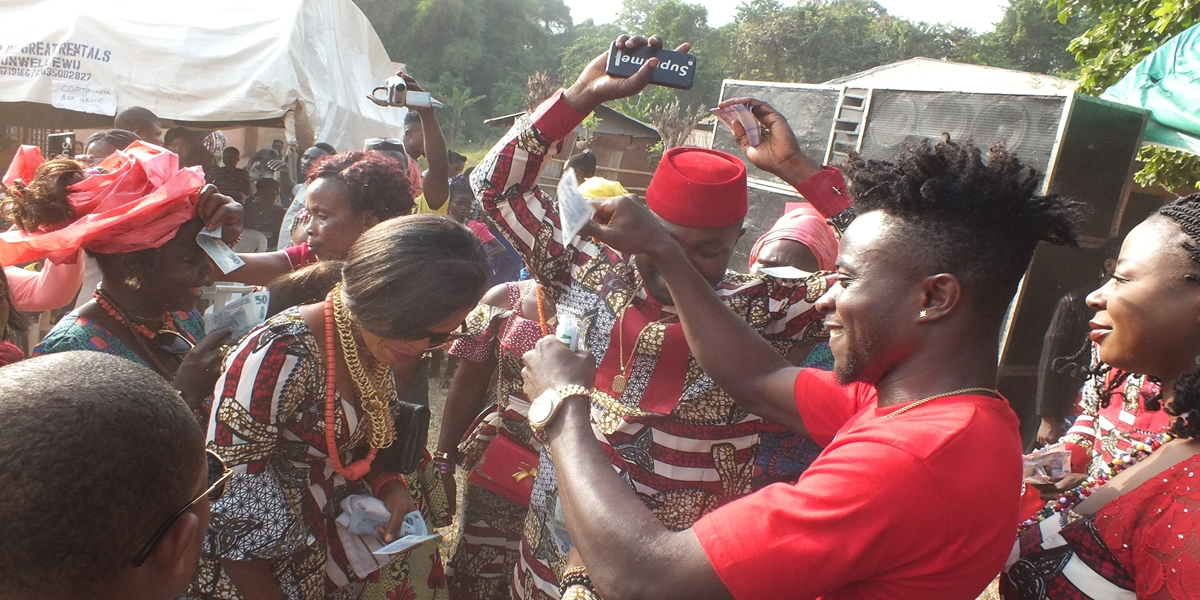

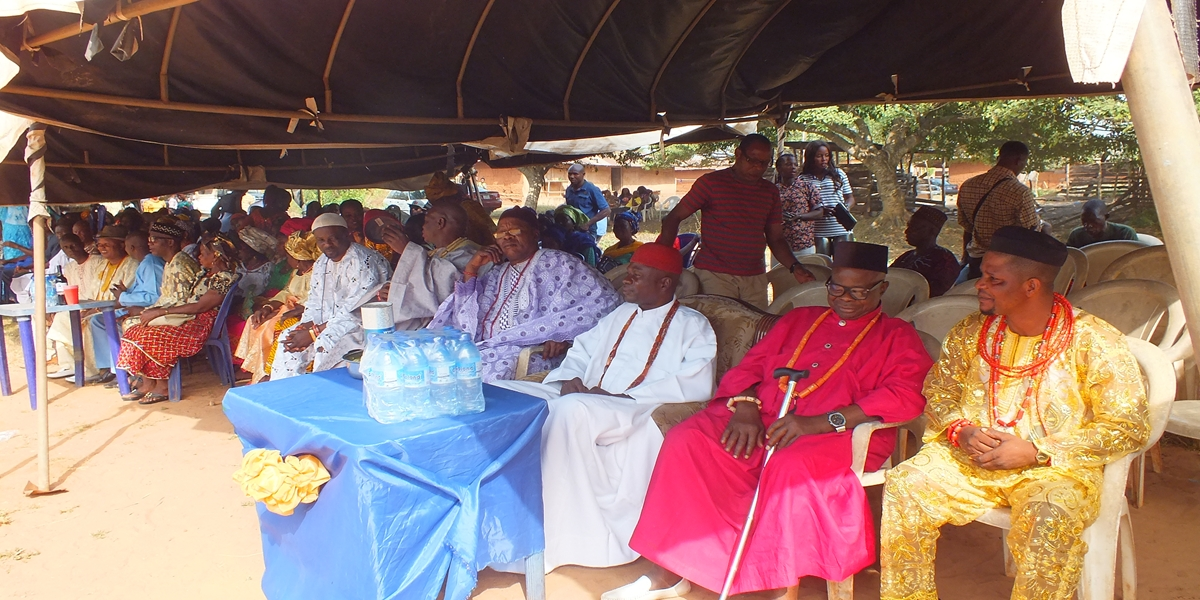

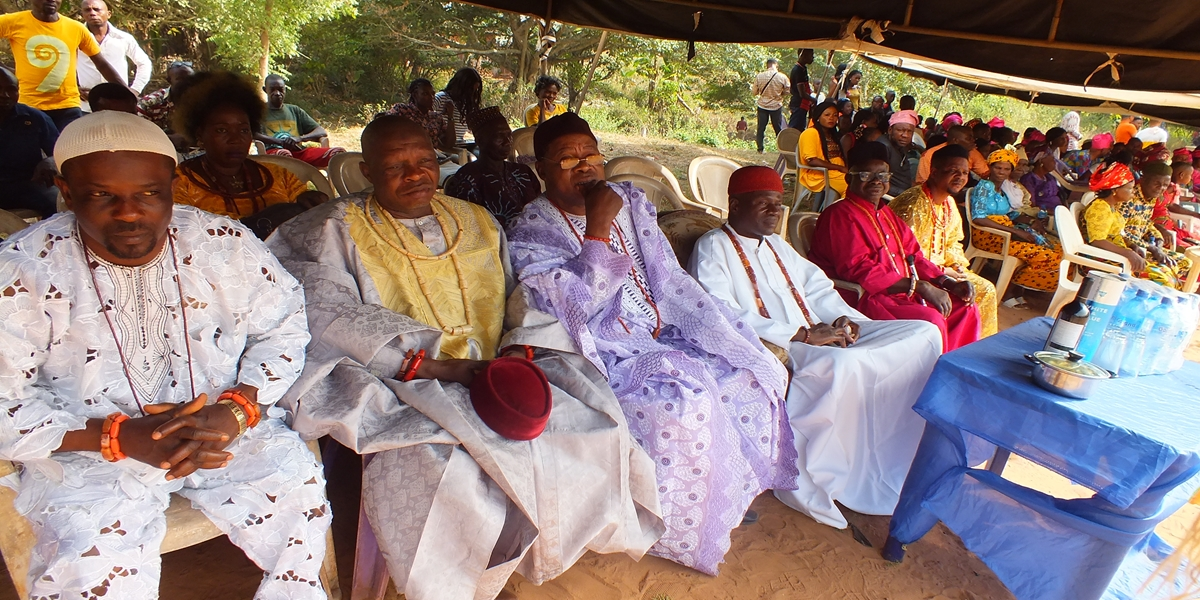

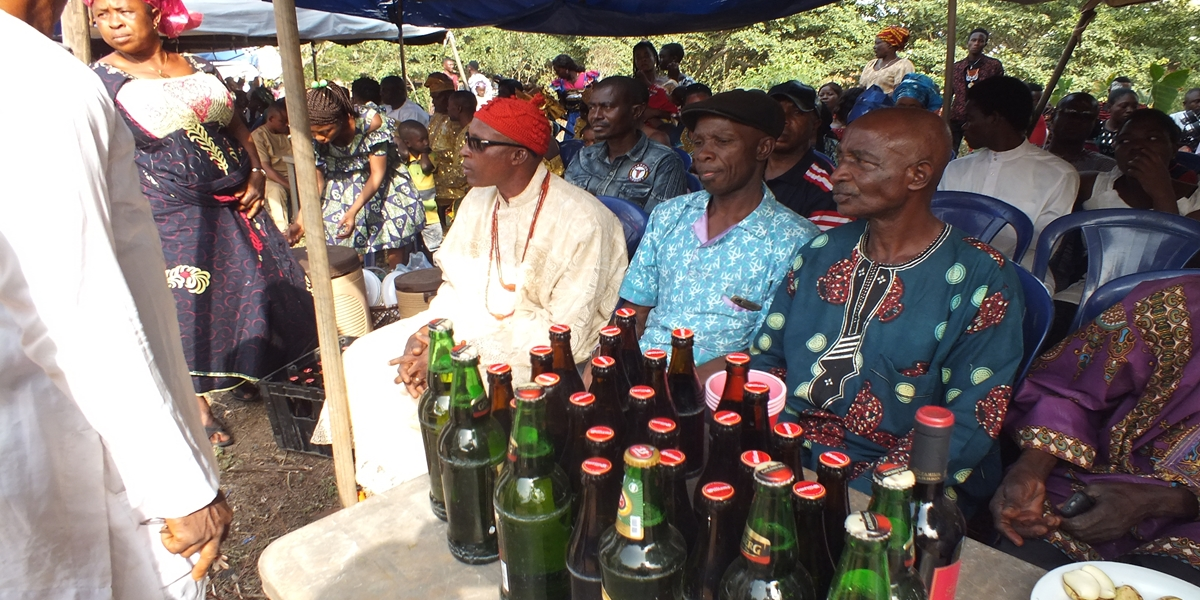

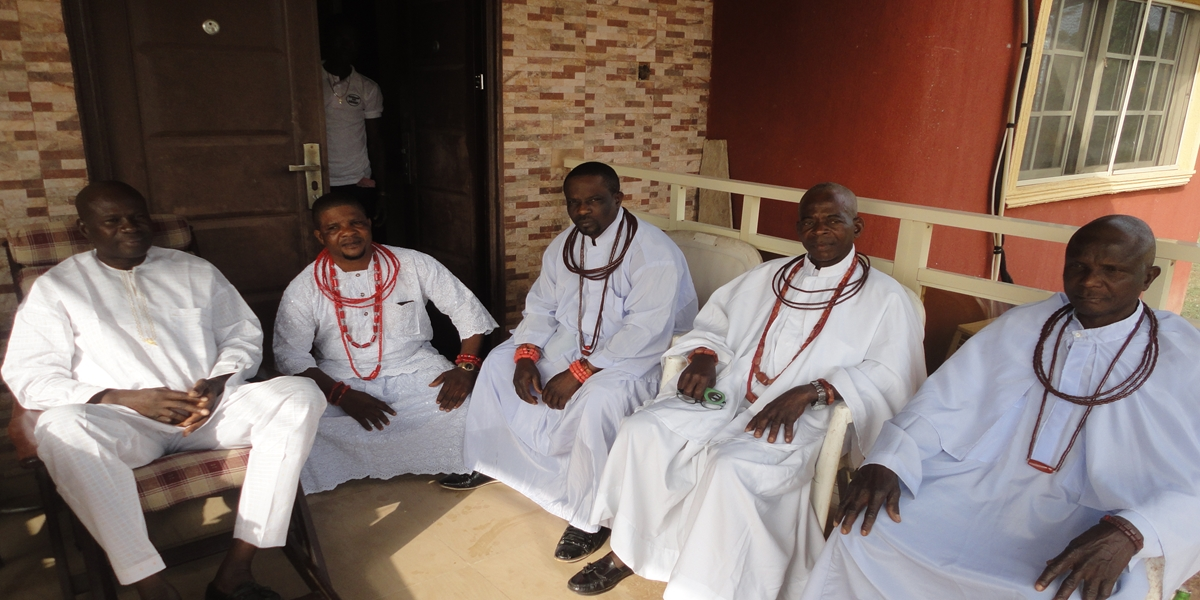

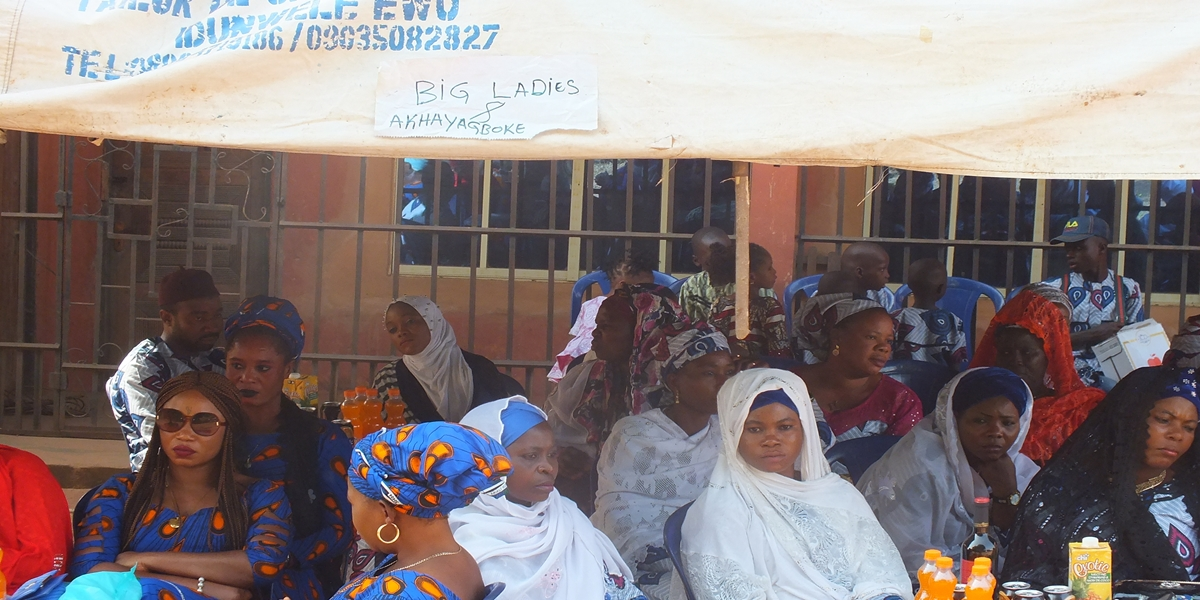

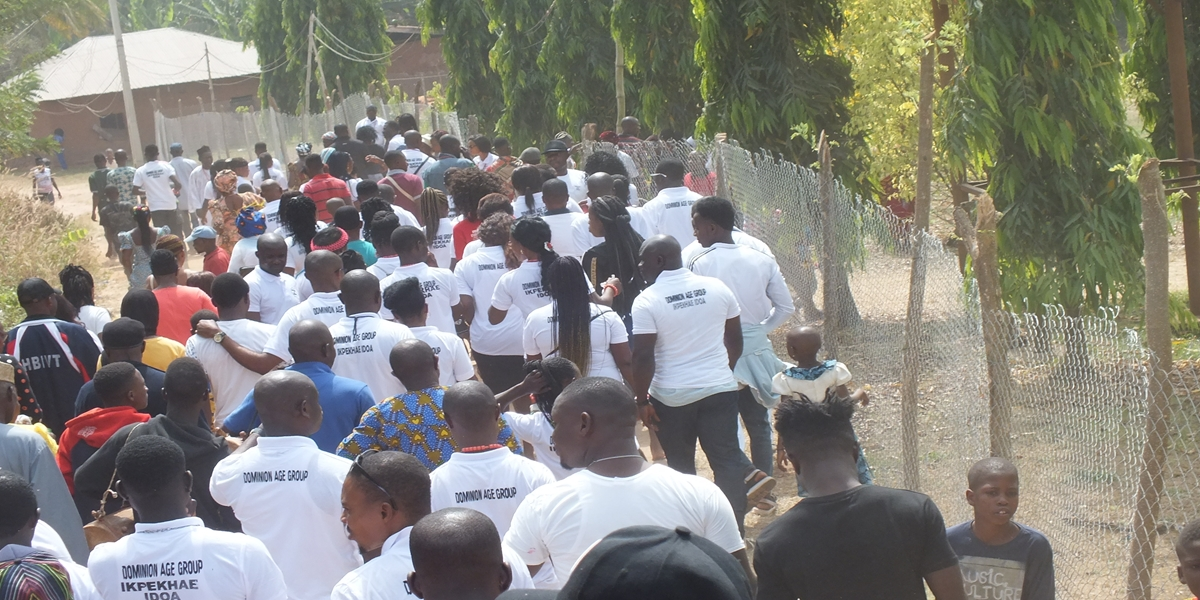

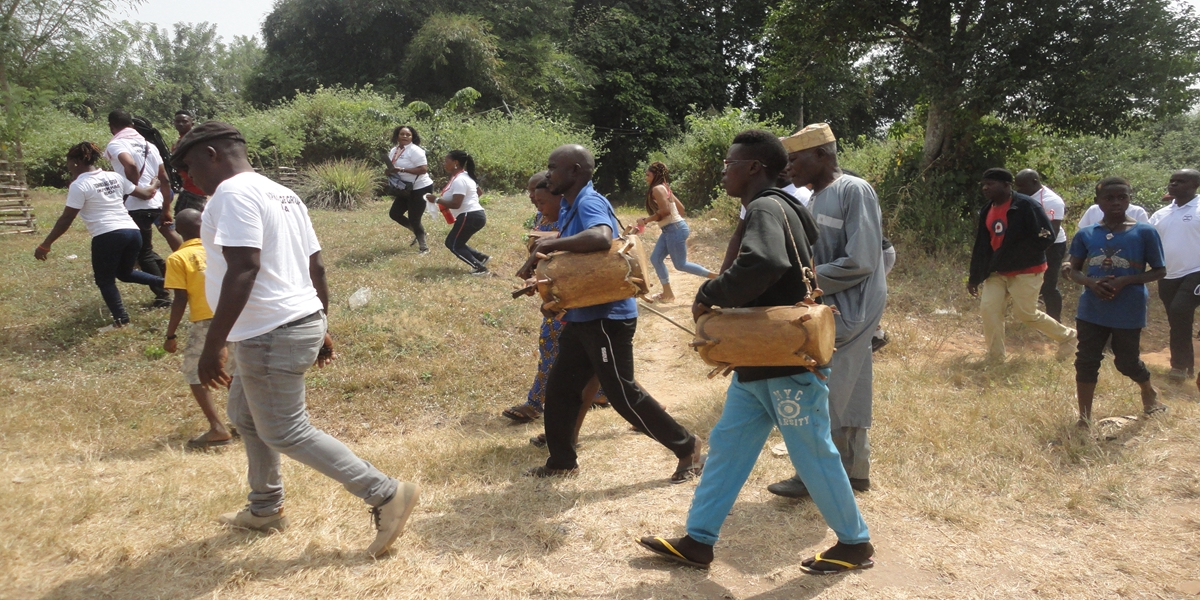

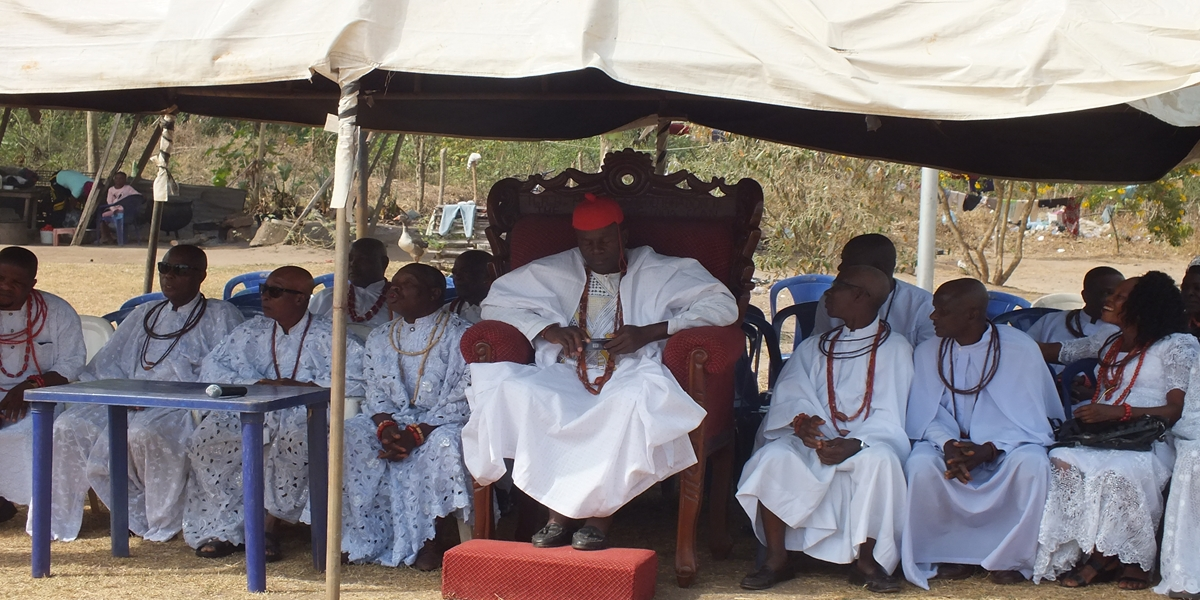

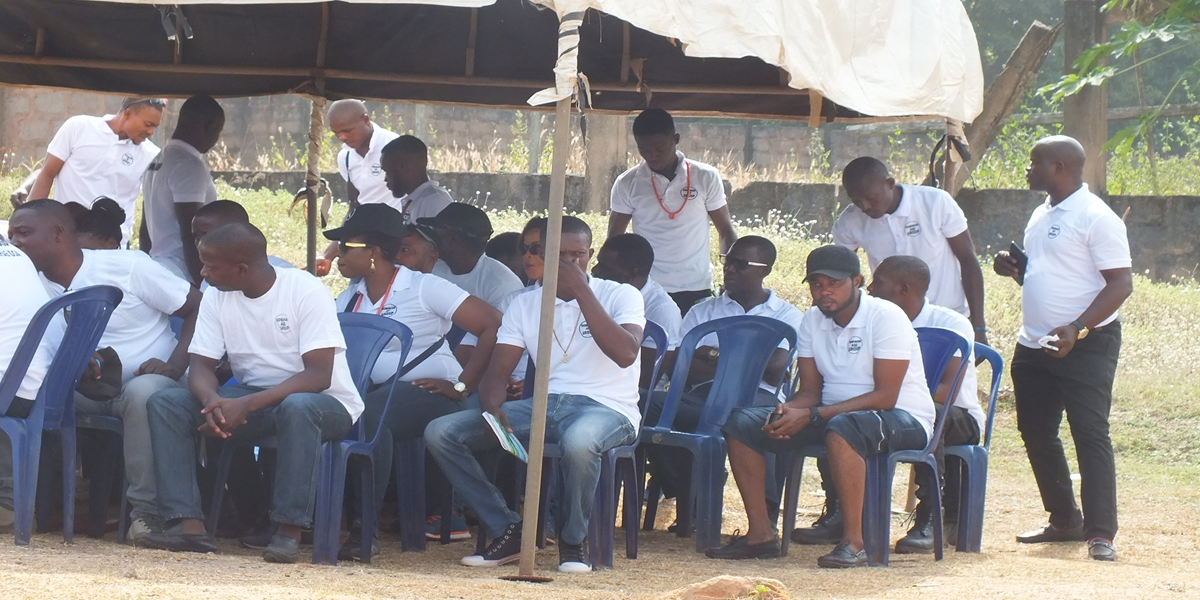

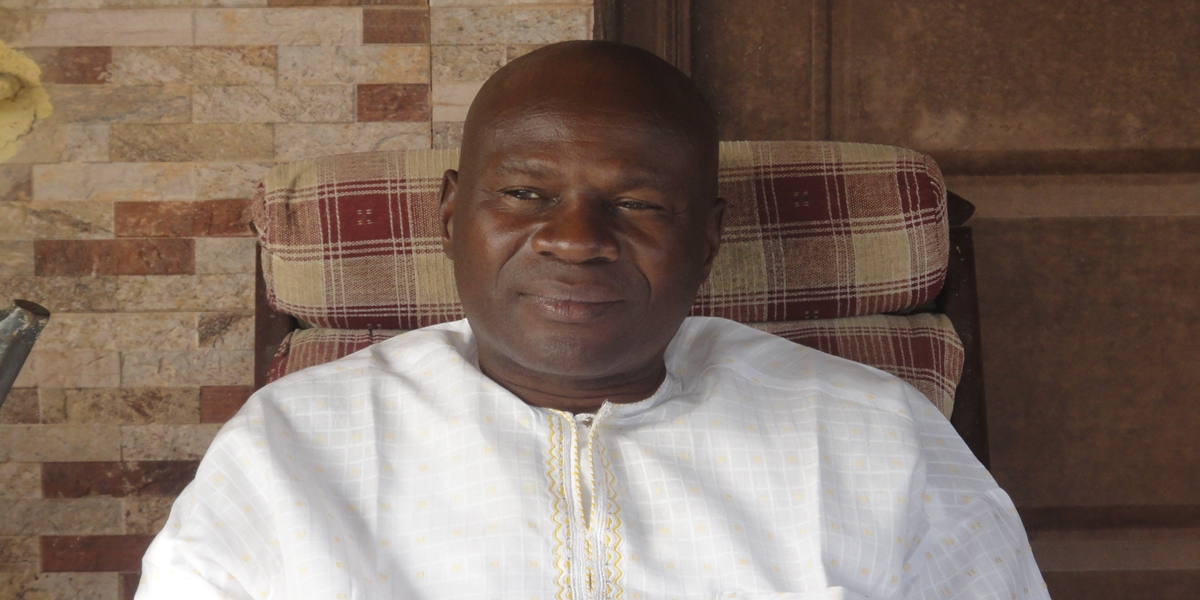
