= Auchi =

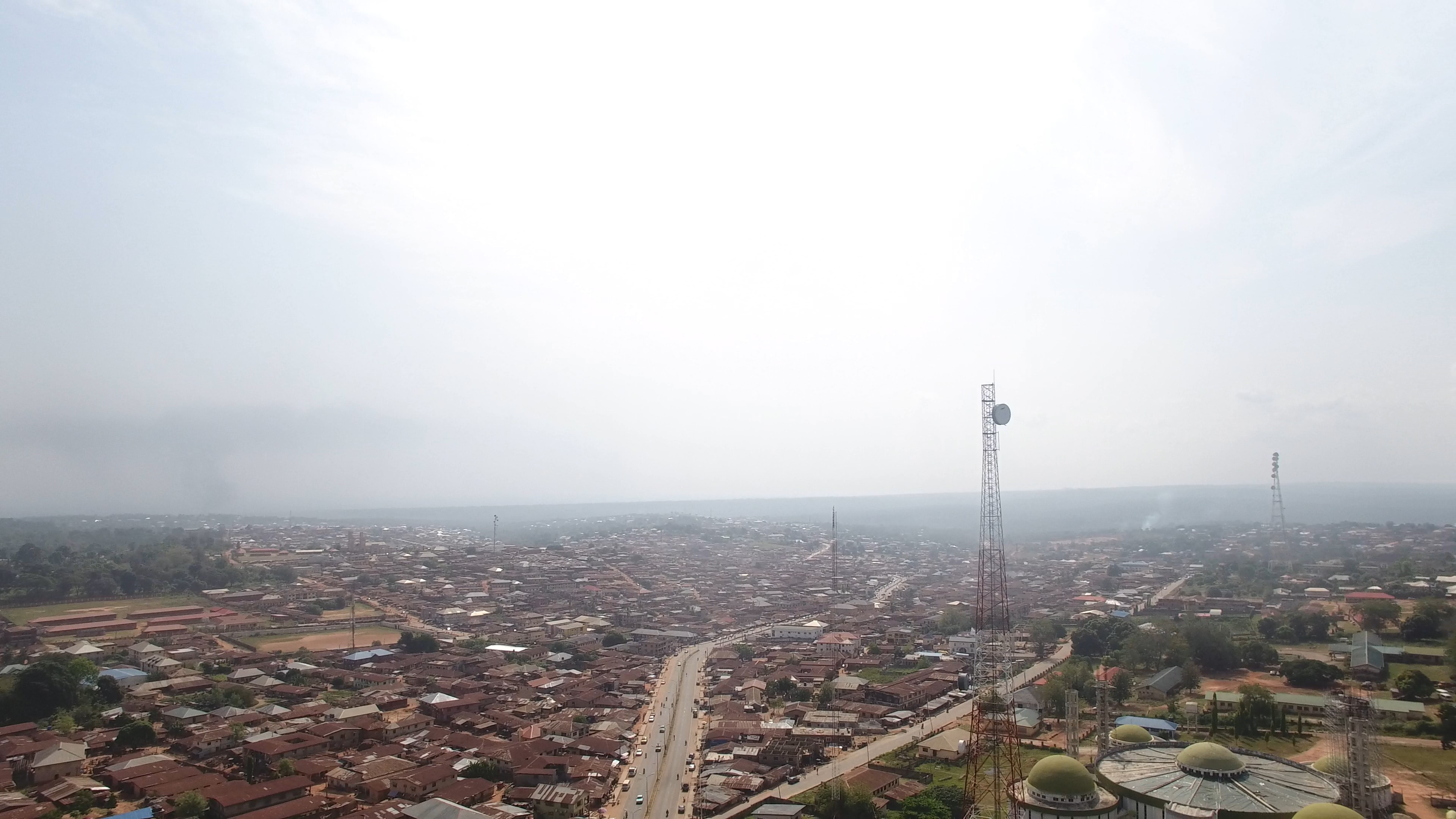
- Aerial view of Auchi Town overhead the Arafat Mosque

- Location in Nigeria
- Coordinates: 7°04′N 6°16′E
- Country: Nigeria
- State: Edo State

Population (150,000)
  - Total: 150,000
- 2006 census

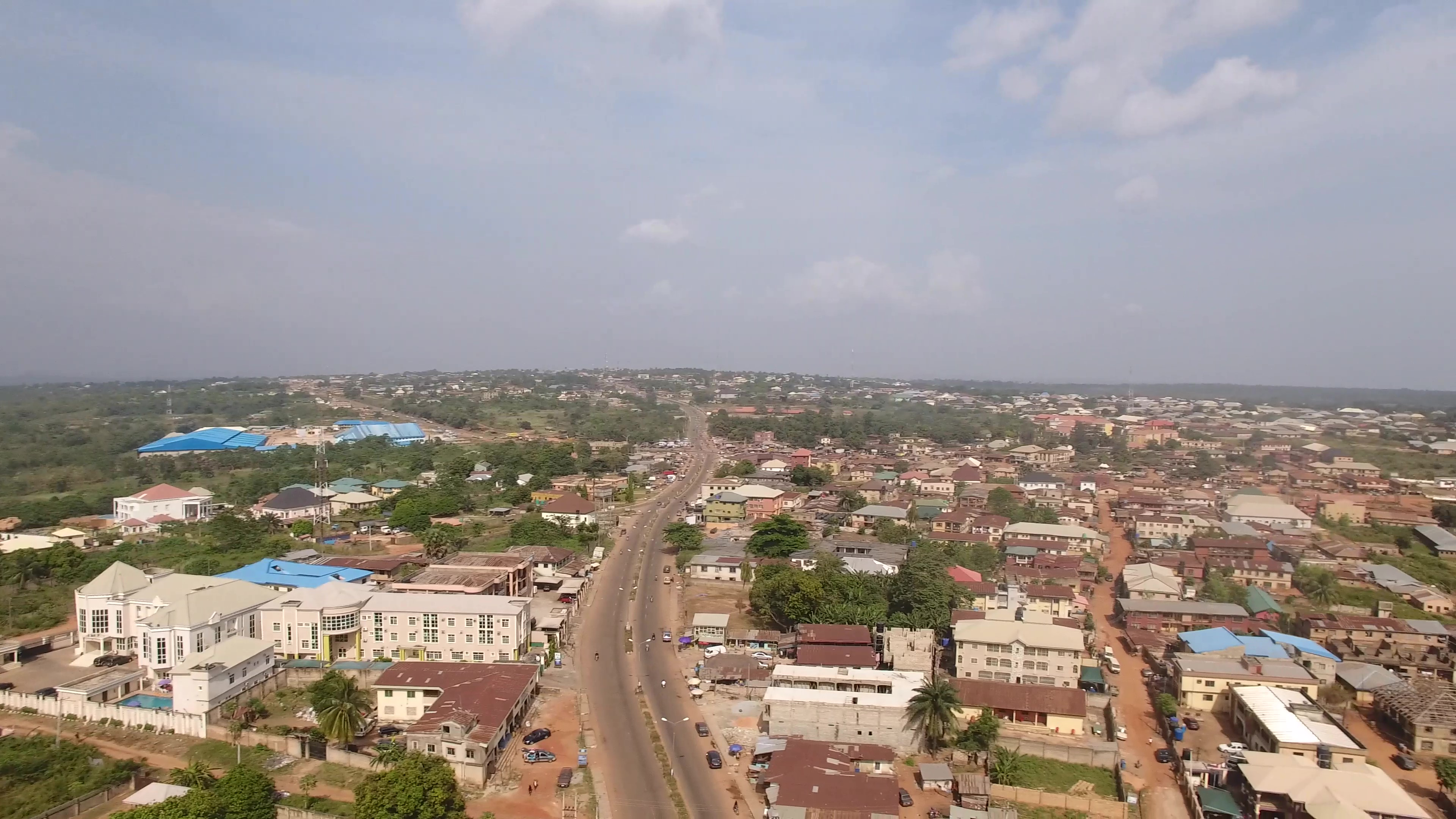
Auchi-Jattu Road

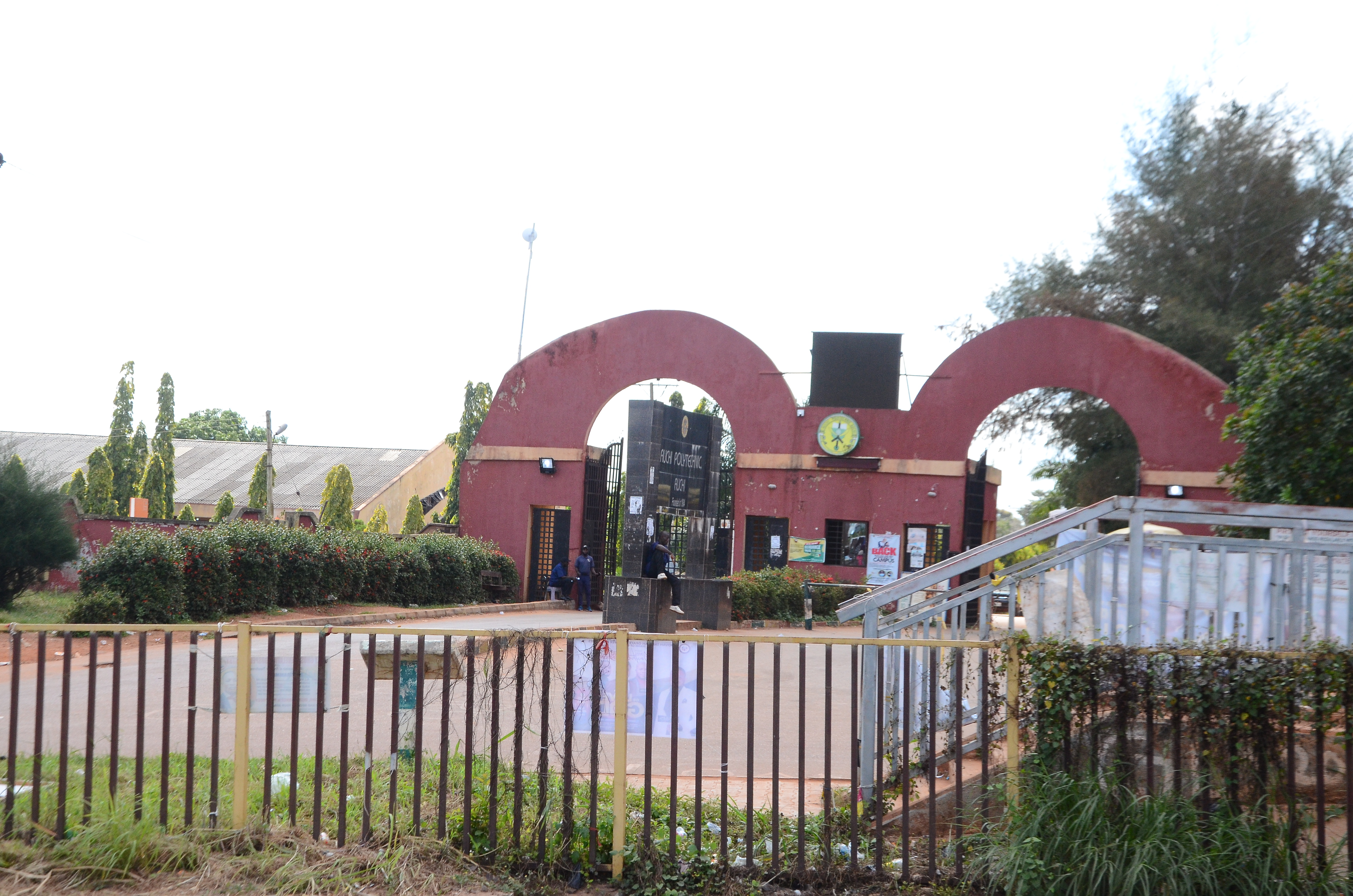
Auchi Polytechnic Main Entrance

Auchi is a city in southern Nigeria.

Located in the Edo State of Nigeria, and part of the Etsako West Local Government Area of the Edo State, Auchi serves as the Local Government headquarters. Other towns in the Etsako West local government area include: Uzairue, South Ibie, Agbede and The Anwain Clan. During the British colonial rule, Auchi served as the headquarters of the Kukuruku Division. It also serves as the administrative headquarters of five districts which was also referred to as quarters and they are: Utsogu, Akpekpe, Aibotse, Igbhei and lyekhei. Auchi is home to the Auchi Polytechnic.

== History ==
There are varied historical accounts relating to the origins of the Auchi people. The most popular of these legends asserts that a mass migration from Udo in present-day Benin City led by a man called Uchi accompanied by his family, and followers headed north and finally settled for the relative calm of the Guinea Savannah belt known today as Etsako land. This migration is believed to have taken place in the mid-15th century, during the reign of Oba Ewuare of the Benin Kingdom. This period in the Benin empire was characterised by constant wars and incessant strife.

In the 19th century, Auchi experienced a major shift due to the Nupe invasion of 1860, which led to a period of foreign rule lasting 37 years (1860–1897). The Nupe, led by Emir Masaba, imposed their administration and introduced elements of Islamic influence, taxation, and military control. Although the Nupe brought economic and religious changes, their rule was largely exploitative, leading to resistance among Auchi’s people. In 1897, the British defeated the Nupe at Bida, and Auchi was subsequently absorbed into the British colonial structure. By 1904, British colonial officers formally took over Auchi, integrating it into the Kukuruku Division under the Southern Protectorate of Nigeria.

During British rule (1904–1960), Auchi was governed under indirect rule, where the traditional Otaru system (monarchical rule) was maintained under British supervision.British policies introduced Western education, new economic systems, and infrastructural developments such as roads and administrative buildings. However, colonial rule was also exploitative, as Auchi’s resources and labor were used to benefit the British administration. By 1960, Nigeria gained independence, and Auchi transitioned into a modern urban center while maintaining its traditional governance structure. Today, Auchi remains a key economic and cultural hub in Edo State, with a strong Islamic influence, historical landmarks, and a diverse population.

=== Language ===
The language spoken by the Auchi people is 'Yekhè' or Etsako, amongst the Afenmai language. It is an Edoid language dialect or variant.

=== Geography ===
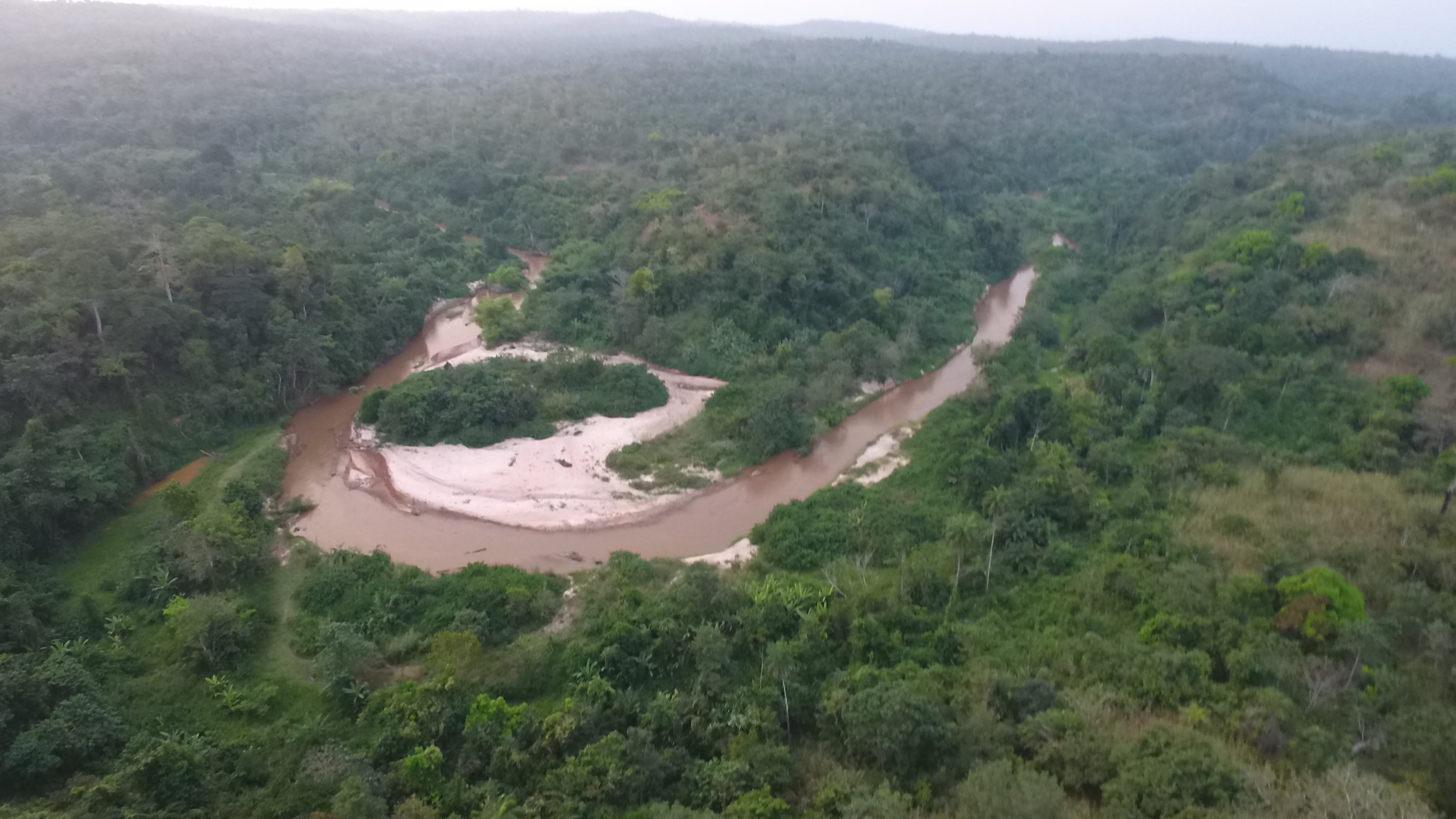
The River Orle

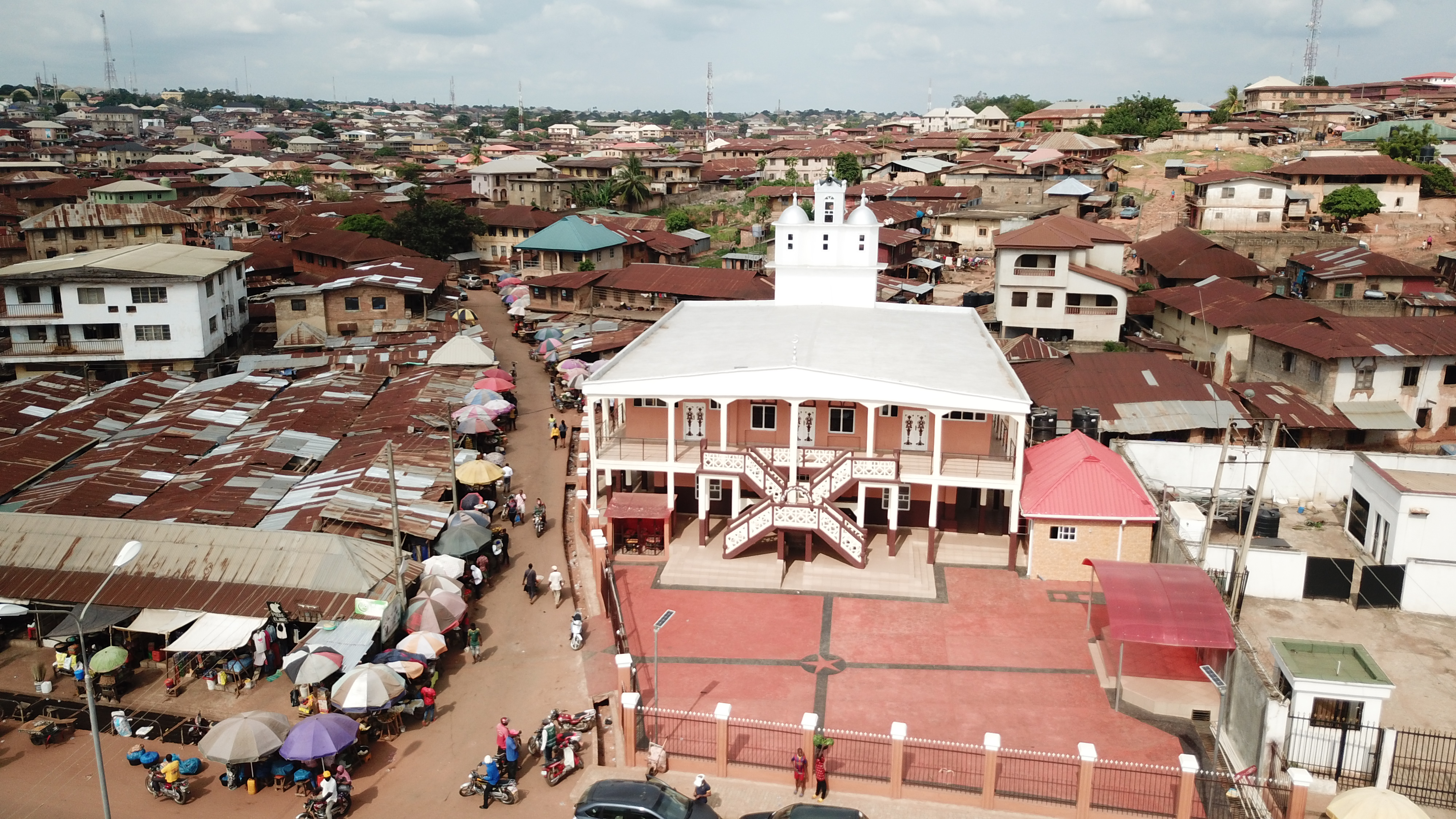
Central Mosque Auchi

Auchi town is divided into five grand quarters which could also be referred to as districts; these are in turn made up of 25 villages.

The five grand quarters are:

- UTSOGUN
- AKPEKPE
- AIBOTSE
- IGBHEI
- IYEKHEI
- In recent times, 24 extra villages have been created.

=== Culture and traditions ===
Auchi Kingdom is headed by a monarchy and the traditional ruler is referred to as the Otaru of Auchi. The 8 January is designated as Auchi Day. This commemorative day was previously called Uchi Day.

== Religion ==
Auchi has been a major Islamic town. Oba Momodu was the first person to embrace Islam in the present-day Edo State, and also the dynamic king of the kingdom and passed on in 1944, Auchi followed quickly in the wake of his action. The people live peacefully. The nice nature of the Auchi people has contributed to the cultural and religious diversity of the town.

=== Religious Origins of Auchi ===
Auchi's religious history dates back to its founding during the late 15th century, when Uchi, a warrior prince from the Benin Kingdom, established the settlement following a dispute with the Oba of Benin. Prior to the adoption of Islam, the people of Auchi practiced African traditional religion, which was characterized by the worship of a multiple deities. The Auchi people believed in a supreme deity, referred to as Oghena or Ogie Okuli, while also worshipping intermediary deities and ancestral spirits or deities including Uchi (the spirit of the kingdom’s founder), Orle (the River goddess), Amanue, and Ogholodio. Shrines dedicated to these gods served as religious centers where offerings of food and livestock were made to seek divine blessings. Ancestor veneration was also practiced, where deceased family members were believed to influence the well-being of their descendants. The Uchi Festival, an annual religious event, was an important occasion during which the community gathered at the site of Uchi’s original settlement to make sacrifices and prayers. However, the spread of Islam in the early 20th century led to the decline of these practices, with Islamic reformers actively dismantling shrines and replacing traditional religious institutions with Islamic structures.

=== Introduction of Islam to Auchi (1914) ===
Islam was introduced to Auchi through interactions with Nupe, Hausa, Fulani, and Yoruba traders in the 19th century, but it was not widely practiced until the early 20th century. The formal adoption of Islam as the official religion of Auchi occurred in 1914, largely due to the efforts of King Momoh I (King Momoh Idaeo), a progressive leader who sought to modernize the kingdom through religious transformation. To encourage mass conversion, Momoh I incentivized religious participation by offering free Islamic clothing to those who learned how to pray and adopted Muslim names. He also invited Muslim scholars to educate the population, further integrating Islamic teachings into the daily lives of Auchi residents. By 1919, when Momoh I officially became Otaru of Auchi, Islam had become deeply rooted in the kingdom, leading to the destruction of traditional religious shrines and the widespread adoption of Islamic governance structures. The establishment of centralized prayer locations reflected the kingdom’s transition to a predominantly Muslim society. Despite this, some Auchi residents continued to consult traditional priests and oracle diviners in secrecy, particularly in matters related to infertility, personal misfortune, and spiritual guidance.

=== Religious Demographics and Contemporary Influence ===
Today, Islam remains the dominant religion in Auchi, shaping both its governance and daily life. The city is often described as resembling a northern Nigerian Muslim community due to the strong influence of Islamic customs. The Arafat Mosque, built in 2002, stands as a major Islamic landmark, symbolizing Auchi's religious significance in the region. However, Christianity has also maintained a presence in the city, particularly with the establishment of the Catholic Diocese of Auchi in 2002, which serves the Christian minority. The first secondary school in Auchi, Our Lady of Fatima College, founded by Christian missionaries in 1962, further reflects Christianity’s continued influence.While African Traditional Religion has largely faded, some elements of pre-Islamic spirituality persist, with certain individuals still offering private sacrifices to Orle (the River Goddess) for fertility and spiritual protection. This religious transformation highlights Auchi’s journey from a traditional African religious society to a prominent Islamic community, while still retaining pockets of religious diversity.

== Population ==
The population grew to 42,638 by 1952, including people from many Nigerian tribes. As of 1995, its population was 140,612. As of 2005–2006, currently, the population is about 150,000 persons. In 2019, Auchi was regarded amongst the fastest growing urban area in Edo State, Nigeria.

== List of Otarus (traditional kings) ==
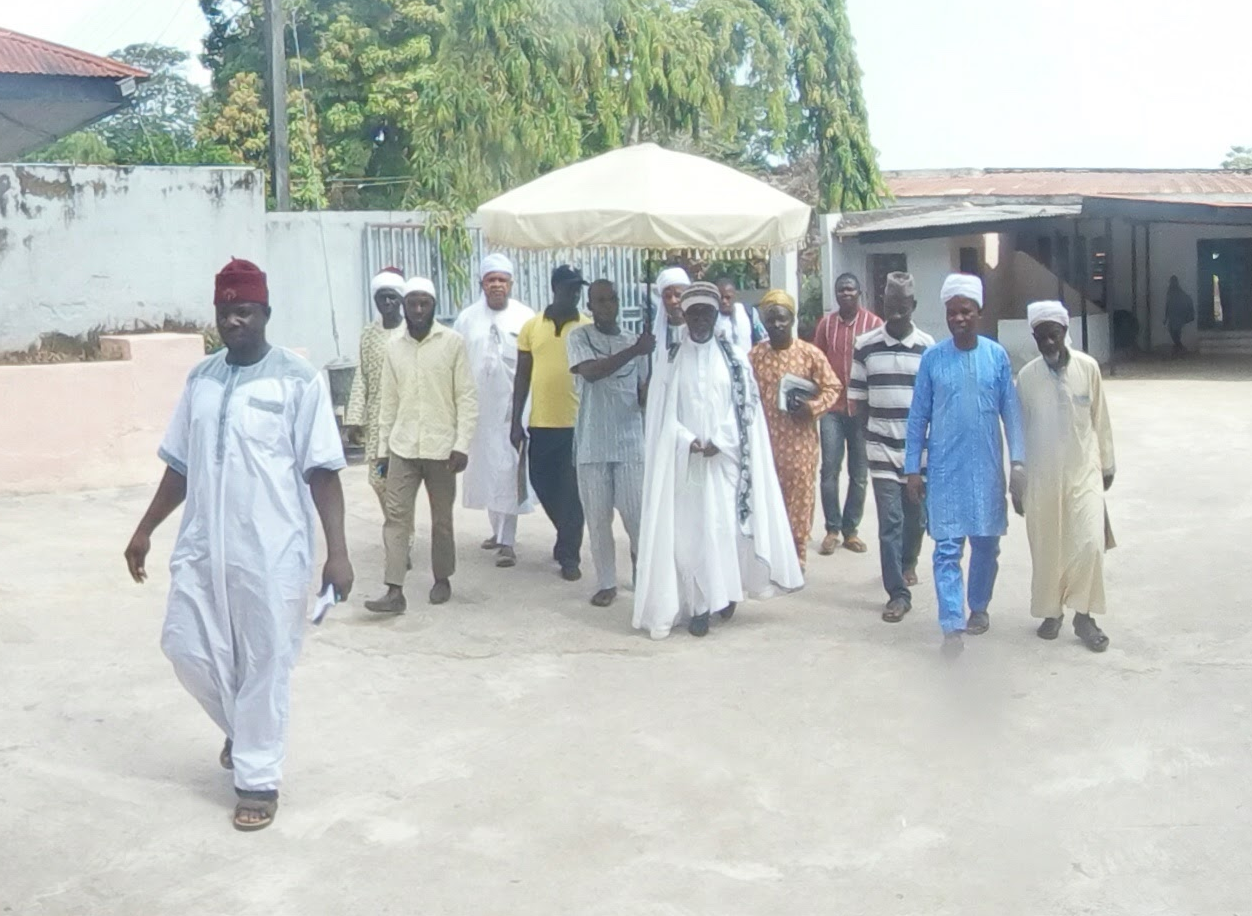
The Otaru of Auchi accompanied by the Daudus (chiefs)

- Alhaji Aliru H. Momoh (Ikelebe III) 10th Otaru of Auchi (1996 -)
- Alhaji Ahmed Guruza Momoh, the 9th Otaru of Auchi (1973 - 1996)
- Abubakar Keremi Momoh, The 8th Otaru of Auchi (1955 - 1970)
- King Momoh Jimah Momoh, the 7th Otaru of Auchi (1945 - 1955)
- King Momoh Idaeo, the 6th Otaru of Auchi (1919 - 1944)
- King Ikharo Ikelebe, the 5th Otaru of Auchi (1905 - 1919)
- Odifili, the 4th Otaru of Auchi (1905)
- Idaeo Ikelebe, the 3rd Otaru of Auchi (1884 - 1905)
- Imoudu Iburogamhe, the 2nd Otaru of Auchi (1872-1884)
- Ikelebe the first, 1st Otaru of Auchi (1819 - 1861)

== Notable people ==
- Kamaru Usman, former UFC Welterweight Champion
- John Momoh, media personality
- Tony Momoh, politician
- Johnson Suleman, pastor
- Aikhunegbe Anthony Malik, Lawyer & the first Senior Advocate
- Major General Hafiz Brahim Momoh, Former Director General of the National Youth Service Corps (NYSC)

== Institutions and infrastructure ==
Auchi is home to:

- Auchi Polytechnic
- Nigerian Army School of Electrical and Mechanical Engineering
- Edo Fertilizer Milling Plant (commenced operation in June 2017)
- Arafat Mosque

== Climate ==
The climate at Auchi, which has an elevation of 0 meters (None feet) above sea level, is tropical wet and dry or savanna (Aw classification). The district's average annual temperature is -0.74% lower than Nigeria's averages at 28.72 °C (83.7 °F). 183.14 millimeters (7.21 inches) of precipitation and 265.4 rainy days (72.71% of the time) are typical yearly totals for Auchi.

== Erosion ==
Erosion Devastation in Auchi

Some parts of Auchi have been seriously devastated due to soil erosion. The Federal Government of Nigeria through the Nigeria Erosion and Watershed Management Project (NEWMAP), assisted by the World Bank, are now tackling the menace and are making fast progress.

== Gallery ==
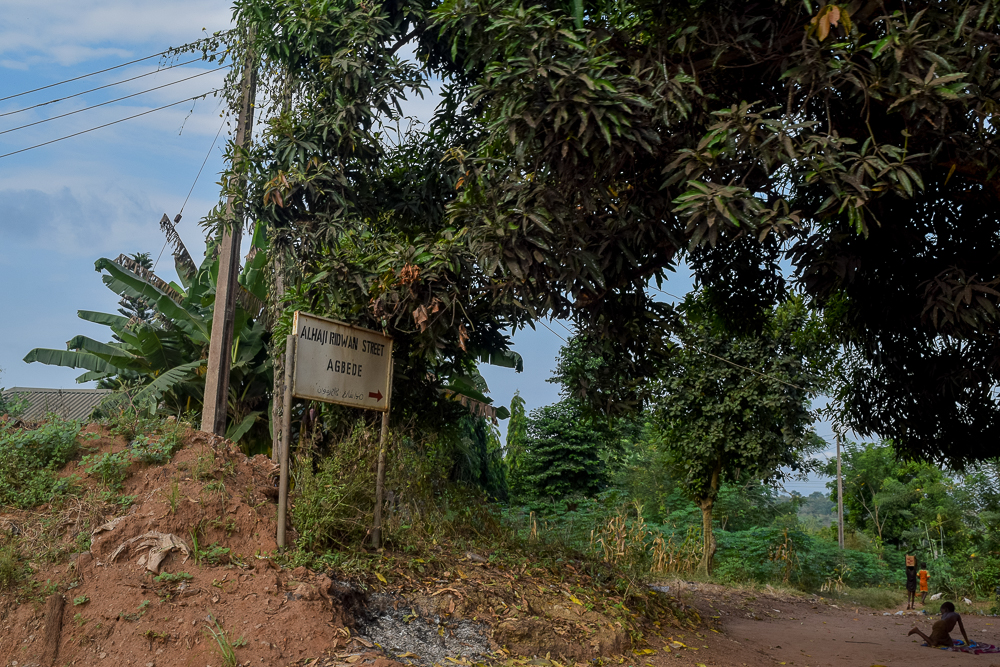

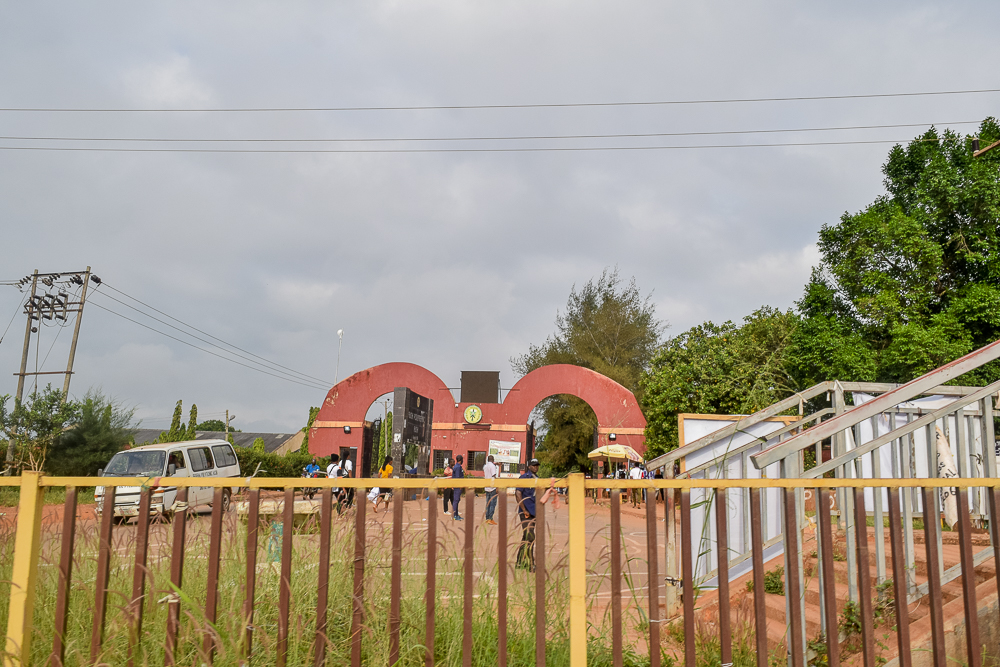

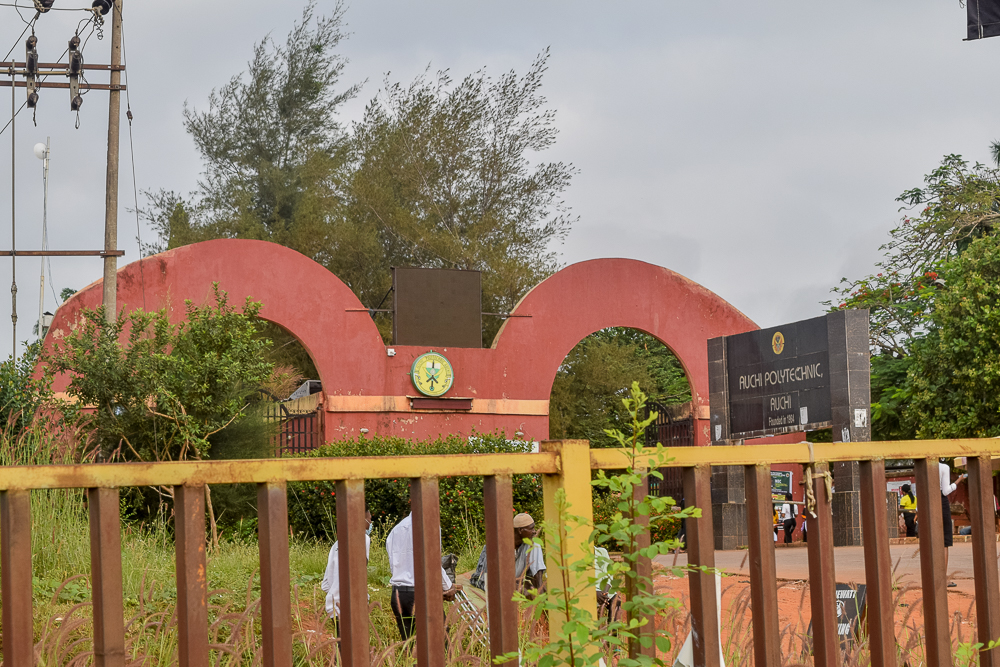

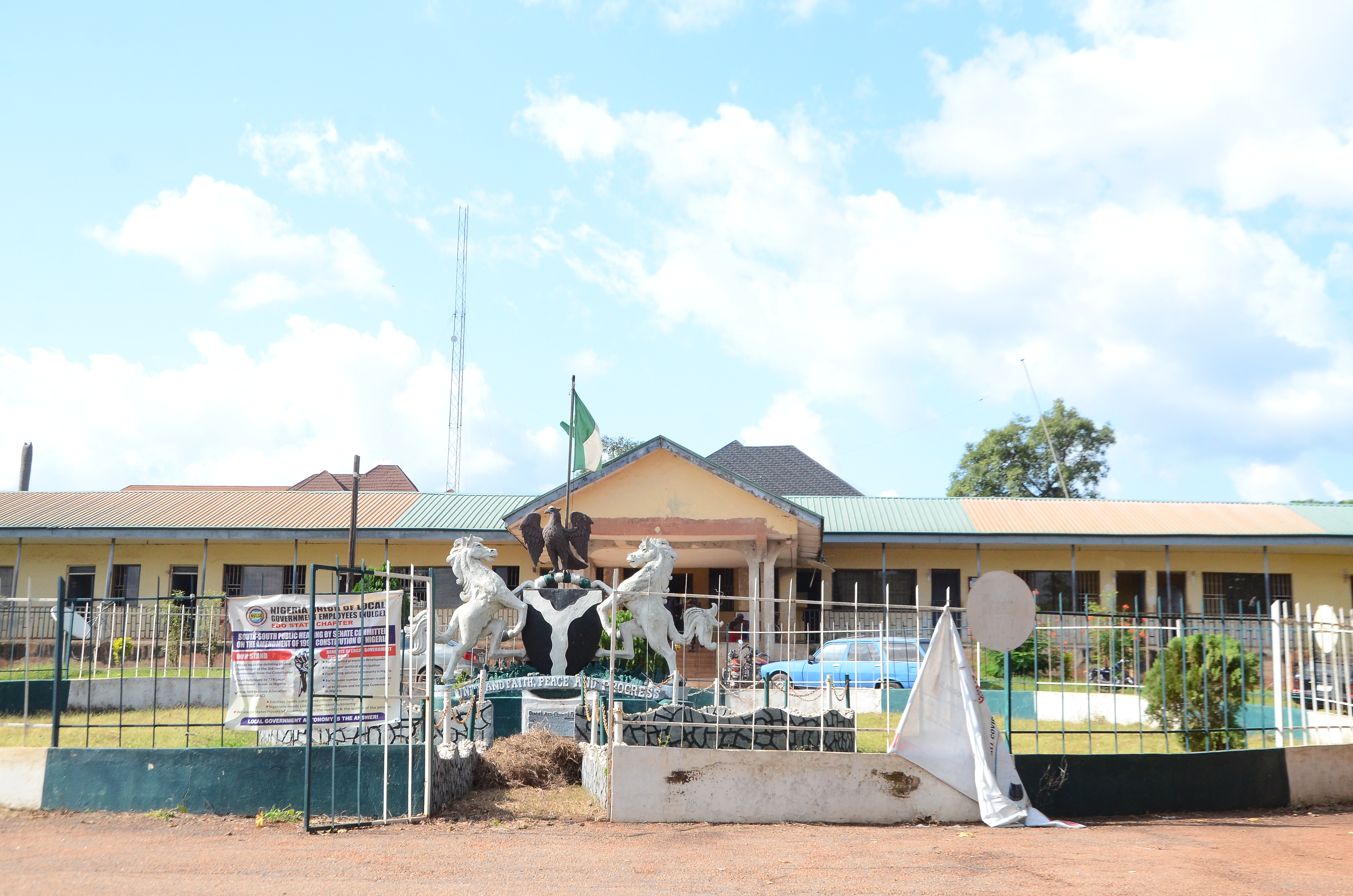
