= Uzairue =

Town in Edo State, Nigeria

- Town in Etsako West
- Interactive map of Uzairue
- Country: Nigeria
- State: Edo State
- LGA: Etsako West
- Time zone: UTC+1 (WAT)
- ZIP code: 300212

Uzairue is a town in the Etsako West Local Government Area of Edo State. Uzairue, which shares boundary with Okpella, includes several villages and it is home to Edo State University, one of the state government owned tertiary institutions in Edo State.
