= Anwain =

Village in Nigeria

Anwain or Anwain Clan is a geographic area in Nigeria and also the people who live in it. Anwain Clan is one of the thirteen clans in Etsakọ land. The geographic area of Anwain is situated in the southern part of Etsakọ West, a local government area of Edo State. It is ward eight among the twelve wards of the Etsakọ local government area. Within Etsakọ West, Anwain is bounded by Ayuele, South Uneme, South Ibie, Ekperi, and Jagbe Clans. It also has boundaries with the clans Uzea and Afuda in the local government areas of Esan-North-East and Esan North Central respectively.

== Culture ==
Predominant religions are Christianity, traditional religions, and Islam. The Anwain people speak Esan (Ishan) language, with a dialect influenced by the Etsakọ language.

The Anwain people perform several traditional dances. They are among the clan that within Esan that performs the Egbabonalimhiin dance. Egbabonalimhiin was devised by hunters in about 1400 CE; it is performed only by initiated males. Other traditional dances include: Ilegheze, performed by AKHOBA title holders of Eware during the Ukpe festival; IKOIGO, performed by women during special ceremonies such as burial of women title holders or marriages; Abayion (Asono); and Agbe.

== Economy ==
Most Anwain people are farmers who practice shifting cultivation. Common crops include yam, cassava, rice, corn, groundnut, cashew, beans, pepper, tomatoes, and plantains. Rice marketed under the trade name Ekpoma is produced in the Anwain region. Bamboo grows wild in this region and is sometimes harvested for commercial sale. There are some small businesses that sell household goods to the local people. Both agricultural and commercial trade is severely restricted by the poor condition of local roads.

== Infrastructure ==
Idegun is the premier village of Anwain. Its other villages are Idegun, Amah, Ibhioba, Uzokin, Ovughu, Otteh, and Eware. All these villages are in close proximity of an average of four kilometers. The villages are linked by seasonal motorable (untarred) roads which are under the supervision of the local government council. The nearest accessible trunk "A" (Benin-Agbede-Auchi-Abuja road) is eighteen kilometers away.

The clan has only one secondary school. The community is virtually running the school with the engagement of auxiliary teachers, and provision of teaching aids from textbooks to chalks. Each of the villages has a maximum of four teachers.

There is only one health clinic with a midwife and an assistant in the clan.

The only water supply in the clan is streams and a few private wells. The Olen river transverses most of the villages; because of this, it is referred to as a "river of unity".

The Anwain clan is ruled by a traditional ruler known as the Clan Head, other villages also have a traditional ruler. The Clan Head is rotational from one community ruler to another after the demise of the present clan head. This rotation has been in practice for years which started from Aware community.
