= Anselm Adodo =

Nigerian scholar (born 1969)

Reverend Fr. Anselm Adodo OSB
- Gbenga
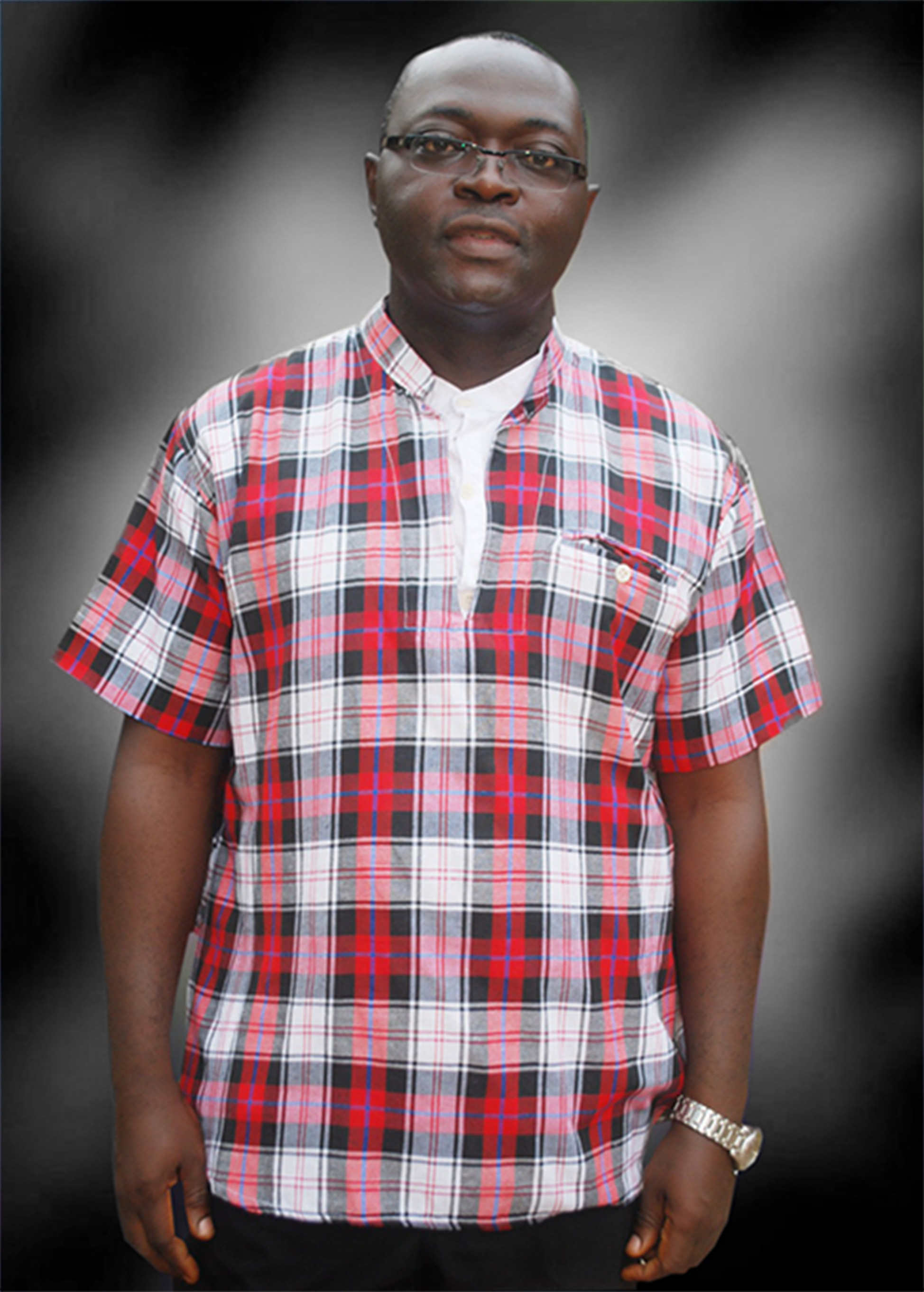
- Born: 1969 (age 56–57); Akure, Ondo State
- Education: Da Vinci Institute, South Africa (Ph.D.)
- Occupation: Social scientist
- Years active: 2000-present
- Employer(s): Paxherbals, University of Ibadan
- Known for: Promoting Traditional African Medicine, Healthy nutrition and lifestyle in Africa

Ecclesiastical career
- Religion: Christianity
- Church: Roman Catholic Archdiocese of Benin City
- Ordained: 4 January 1997
- Writing career
- Genre: Alternative medicine, Epidemiology, Traditional African medicine,
- Notable awards: Entrepreneur of the year Alternative medicine – Association of West African Journalists; 2012
- Website: www.adodoanselm.com

Adodo Anselm Gbenga (born 1969) is a Nigerian scholar and priest. He is a Benedictine monk and priest of the Roman Catholic Church in Edo State, Nigeria.

Adodo is an advocate for alternative medicine. He founded Nigeria’s first alternative medicine and research laboratory enterprise, called Pax Herbal Clinic and Research Laboratories, in 1997. He has also written several books on alternative medicine, nutrition, health and epidemiology.

== Education and career ==
In 1979, Adodo joined St. Thomas Aquinas College Akure to begin his secondary school education. He completed his secondary education in 1985 and earned a West African school certificate. He visited the Ewu Monastery in 1987 and he joined that November.

Adodo obtained a Higher Diploma in Scholastic Philosophy from the Ewu Monastery in 1992 and a BA in Religious Studies from the University of Nigeria, Nsukka, in 1995. In 1997, he obtained a Master's degree in Systematic Theology from Duquesne University. The Da Vinci Institute in South Africa awarded him a PhD (Management of Technology and Innovation Systems) in 2015 for his doctoral studies, which started in 2012. He obtained a PhD in Medical Sociology from the University of Benin in 2017.

Adodo is an adjunct professor at the Institute of African Studies (IAS), the University of Ibadan, Nigeria (where he teaches African Transformation Studies and Traditional African Medicine), and he is also the Chief Executive Officer at Paxherbals and the director of Ofure (Pax) Integral Research and Development Initiative.

== Alternative medicine ==
Adodo is a proponent of African traditional medicine, which he refers to as a system of healing rooted in indigenous knowledge and cultural practices. He defines it as an approach that integrates herbal remedies with spiritual and communal perspectives on health. According to Adodo, this system includes theories about the human body and its relationship to the community, nature, and the environment.

He began studying traditional healing practices in the early 1990s, travelling across Nigeria to interview traditional healers. He has stated that these experiences motivated him to document and preserve local knowledge systems that he believed were being marginalised.

== Personal life ==
Adodo is the third of five children- Bankole, Funke, Bandele (Dele), and Omotola (Tola).

== Honours ==
- Fellow, Nigeria Society of Botanists

== Works ==
- Herbs for healing. Receiving God’s Healing Through nature (1997). Ilorin: Decency Printers
- Nature power - A Christian Approach to Herbal Medicine (2000). Akure: Don Bosco Publishers
- The Healing Radiance of the Soul. A Guide to Holistic Healing (2003). Lagos: Agelex Publication
- New Frontiers in African Medicine (2005). Lagos: Metropolitan Publishers; Herbal Medicine and the Revival of African Civilization (2010). Lagos: Zoe Communications
- Disease and Dietary Patterns in Edo Central Nigeria. An epidemiological survey (2013) Germany: Lambert Academic Publishing
- Nature Power: Natural Medicine in Tropical Africa (2013 revised edition). UK: Author House
- Integral Community Enterprise in Africa. Communitalism as an Alternative to Capitalism (2017) London: Routledge.
