= Ogbu =

- Gender: Male
- Language: Igbo

Origin
- Origin: Nigeria
- Region of origin: South east

Ogbu (audio) is a given name and family name, with origins in Igbo language and commonly found in Nigeria.

== People with the given name Ogbu ==
- Ogbu Kalu (1942 – 2009), Nigerian theologian

== People with the surname Ogbu ==
- Chigozie Ogbu, Nigerian academician
- Derick Ogbu (born 1990), Nigerian professional footballer
- Igoh Ogbu (born 2000), Nigerian professional footballer
- John Ogbu (1939–2003), Nigerian-American anthropologist and professor
- Liz Ogbu, American architect, designer and urbanist
- Moses Ogbu (born 1991), Nigerian footballer
- Ollie Ogbu (born 1987), American Defensive Line coach for Wagner College
- Osita Ogbu, Nigerian professor of economics at the University of Nigeria
