= Chima Korieh =

Nigerian academic (born 1962)

Prof. Chima Korieh
- Born: 1962 (age 63–64); Mbaise, Imo State, Nigeria

Academic background
- Education: University of Toronto (PhD, 2003); University of Bergen (1996); University of Helsinki (MA, 1994); University of Nigeria, Nsukka (BA, 1991)

Chima Jacob Korieh (born 1962) is a Nigerian writer and professor of African History who was the former president of "Igbo Studies Association", and the founding editor of Igbo Studies Review, a journal of the association. He was awarded the Rockefeller Foundation's "African Dissertation Internship Award" in 1999 and has written many books and scholarly articles including The Land Has Changed and The Way We Lived. Korieh is a Fellow of the African Studies Centre, Leiden and at University of Oxford in 2008. While in Nigeria, he taught History and International Studies at the University of Nigeria, Nsukka. He was also the director of Africana Studies at Marquette University, Milwaukee.

== Early life and education ==
Chima as he is called in Igbo was born in 1962 in Mbaise, a locality in Imo State, Nigeria. He attended Kaduna Polytechnic, Kaduna, where he earned his Ordinary National Diploma in Print Technology in 1989. He proceeded to the University of Nigeria and earned a bachelor's degree in History and Education in 1991. Chima left Nigeria for Finland and studied at University of Helsinki, Finland, where he earned a master's degree in education in 1994. Two years later, he also acquired a Master of Philosophy degree in history from the University of Bergen, Norway. Continuing in 2003, he got his PhD in African History from the University of Toronto, Canada.

== Career ==
Chima began his career in 2001 as an instructor in African History at the University of Toronto, Scarborough. Later, he became a Jacob Jameson Teaching Fellow at Hartwick College, Oneonta from 2001 to 2002. From 2002 to 2004, he was an assistant professor of African History at Central Michigan University, US as well as an associate professor at Rowan University, New Jersey subsequently from 2004 to 2007. In 2008, he was awarded a British Academy Fellow at Oxford University. Chima later became an adjunct professor at the University of Manitoba, Canada and in 2014, he was promoted to professorship at the University of Nigeria, as well as Marquette University.

He served as the head of department at the Department of History and International Studies, University of Nigeria (2015–2017) and later was appointed the deputy director of the Institute of African Studies, University of Nigeria. In 2005, he co-edited with Ogbu Kalu a book entitled, Religion, History, and Politics in Nigeria and was the African associate editor of the Encyclopedia of Western Imperialism and Colonialism since 1450.

His researches have spanned teachings on imperialism, colonialism and African Diaspora history, which is evident to his writings. On March 27, 2014, Korieh delivered a paper entitled "Fighting for the Empire: Petition as African Voices During the Second World War" at the "Eye on Africa" weekly seminar series of the African Studies Center at Michigan State University. He was the Director of Africana Studies at Marquette University, Milwaukee where his research focused on West African economic and social history in the colonial period. During the COVID-19 pandemic in 2020, Chima Korieh advised that online classes in summer at Marquette University would help to continue the process of teaching and learning. He began teaching classes online to demonstrate his resolve. His view on racism is for greater respect for and inclusion of black people in America and more communalism with lesser individualism in that regard.

In 2021, he was appointed member, of the Governing Council, Ihechukwu Madubuike Institute of Technology, Isuochi, Abia State. In 2023, he was part of the documentary film about Giannis Antetokounmpo.

== Editorship of journals ==
He is the founding editor of the Igbo Studies Review in 2013. He is also the Founding Managing Editor, Journal of African Gender Studies from 2020; editor-in-chief, Oxford Bibliographies.; Editor, Nigerian Studies Review as from 2015.; Editorial board member, Notes and Records: An International Journal of African and African Diaspora, Kentucky State University; editor-in-chief, Ikenga International Journal of African Studies, Institute of African Studies, University of Nigeria, Nsukka (Scopus-indexed).; Managing Editor, Ofo: Journal of Transatlantic Studies (African Studies Program, Bowling Green State University); Editor, Nsukka Journal of History and member of the Goldline and Jacobs Publishing company.; and, Editorial board member, Lexington Books – After the Empire: The Francophone World and Postcolonial France Series.

== Awards and grants ==
Korieh has won many awards. Some of them are the Rowan University Achievement in Research Recognition (2007); British Academy Fellow, St Anthony's College, Oxford University (2008); and, Thabo Mbeki Award for Research Leadership, the University of Texas at Austin (2021). He was awarded the Council for the Development of Social Science Research in Africa (CODESRIA) grant for a Graduate Workshop ($8,800); British Academy Research Fellowship, African Studies Center, Oxford University, Spring 2008 (£4,017); Lisbet Rausing Charitable Fund, UK/Endangered Archives Program in 2007 for the Project: "Rescuing Eastern Nigerian history: preserving the holdings of Enugu and Calabar regional archives," (£16, 012); Visiting Research Fellowship, African Research Center, Leiden, Netherlands (April–July 2006) ($8,000); Rockefeller Foundation African Dissertation Internship Award ($21,000) and many others.

== Research ==
=== The Land Has Changed (2010) ===
The Land Has Changed: History, Society and Gender in Colonial Eastern Nigeria was published by the University of Calgary Press in 2019. Chima has cited researching the book when he was a British Academy Fellow and at the African Research Center, Leiden, Netherlands.

According to him, "Agriculture has dominated Africa's economy over the past century, but in 1990s, African farmers faced declining incomes and economic hardships." His study of southeastern Nigeria's Igbo region offered an understanding of this decline. In the research, he explored the dangers of colonialism, statism, and globalization.

=== Nigeria and World War II (2020) ===
Chima Korieh's book, Nigeria and World War II: Colonialism, Empire, and Global Conflict was published by Cambridge University Press. He write the book which has been praised for its exploration and string portrayal of Nigeria's involvement in the World War II. In a viewpoint by the Nigerian newspaper Vanguard, it was listed among books that displays more about wars in Nigeria; it implores the impact of the war on Nigerian society, economy, and politics, while highlighting the role of propaganda in drawing Nigerians into the conflict and experiences of Nigerians (men and women) enlisted into the military. The book was reviews and welcomed with highly acclaimed contributions. Yakubu Suleiman in a review on Africa Spectrum praised the book writing, "Through its accessible writing and innovative approach, the book contributes significantly to the understanding of Nigeria's role in World War II and challenges Eurocentric narratives of the conflict."

== Publications ==
- ——— (ed.). "Olaudah Equiano and the Igbo world : history, society and Atlantic diaspora connections". Smithsonian Institution.
- ———; Nwajiaku, Ijeoma C., eds. (2022). Chinua Achebe and the Igbo-African world: between fiction, fact, and historical representation. Lexington Books. ISBN 978-1-7936-5269-0.
- ———; Onogwu, Elizabeth O., eds. (2020). Sexuality, human rights, and public policy. Fairleigh Dickinson University Press; Rowman & Littlefield. ISBN 978-1-68393-233-8.
- ——— (2014). Life not worth living: Nigerian petitions reflecting an African society's experiences during World War II. African world series. Carolina Academic Press. ISBN 978-1-61163-607-9.
- ——— (2013). The way we lived: essays on Nigerian history, gender and society. Goldline & Jacobs Publishing. ISBN 978-1-938598-03-6.
- ———, ed. (2012). The Nigeria-Biafra War: genocide and the politics of memory. Cambria Press. ISBN 978-1-60497-811-7.
- ———; Nwauwa, Apollos O., eds. (2011). Against all odds: the Igbo experience in postcolonial Nigeria. Goldline & Jacobs Pub. ISBN 978-978-49498-5-9.
- ——— (2001). "The Invisible Farmer? Women, Gender, and Colonial Agricultural Policy in the Igbo Region of Nigeria, 1913-1954". African Economic History (29): 117–162. doi:10.2307/3601709. ISSN 0145-2258. JSTOR 3601709.
- ——— (2003). "Alcohol and Empire: Illicit Gin Prohibition and Control in Colonial Eastern Nigeria". African Economic History (31): 111–134. doi:10.2307/3601949. ISSN 0145-2258. JSTOR 3601949.
- ——— (2010). "May It Please Your Honor: Letters of Petition as Historical Evidence in an African Colonial Context". History in Africa. 37: 83–106. doi:10.1353/hia.2010.0034. ISSN 0361-5413. JSTOR 40864621.
- ——— (2006). "Voices from within and without: Sources, Methods, and Problematics in the Recovery of the Agrarian History of the Igbo (Southeastern Nigeria)". History in Africa. 33: 231–253. doi:10.1353/hia.2006.0015. ISSN 0361-5413. JSTOR 20065772.
- ———; Kolapo, Femi James, eds. (2007). The aftermath of slavery: transitions and transformations in southeastern Nigeria. Africa World Press. ISBN 978-1-59221-515-7.
- ———; Ezeonu, Ifeanyi (2010). Remembering Biafra: narrative, history, and memory of the Nigeria-Biafra War. Goldline & Jacobs Publishers. ISBN 978-978-49498-3-5.
- ———; Nnaemeka, Obioma (2010). Shaping our struggles: Nigerian women in history, culture and social change. Africa World Press. ISBN 978-1-59221-746-5.
- ———; Mbanaso, Michael U. (2010). Minorities and the state in Africa. Cambria Press. ISBN 978-1-60497-669-4.
- ———; Njoku, Raphael Chijioke (2007). Missions, States, and European Expansion in Africa. Taylor and Francis.
- ——— (April 2, 2024). Religion, History, and Politics in Nigeria: Essays in Honor of Ogbu U. Kalu. University Press of America. ISBN 9780761831402.
