= Paxherbals =

Nigerian alternative medicine product manufacturing company

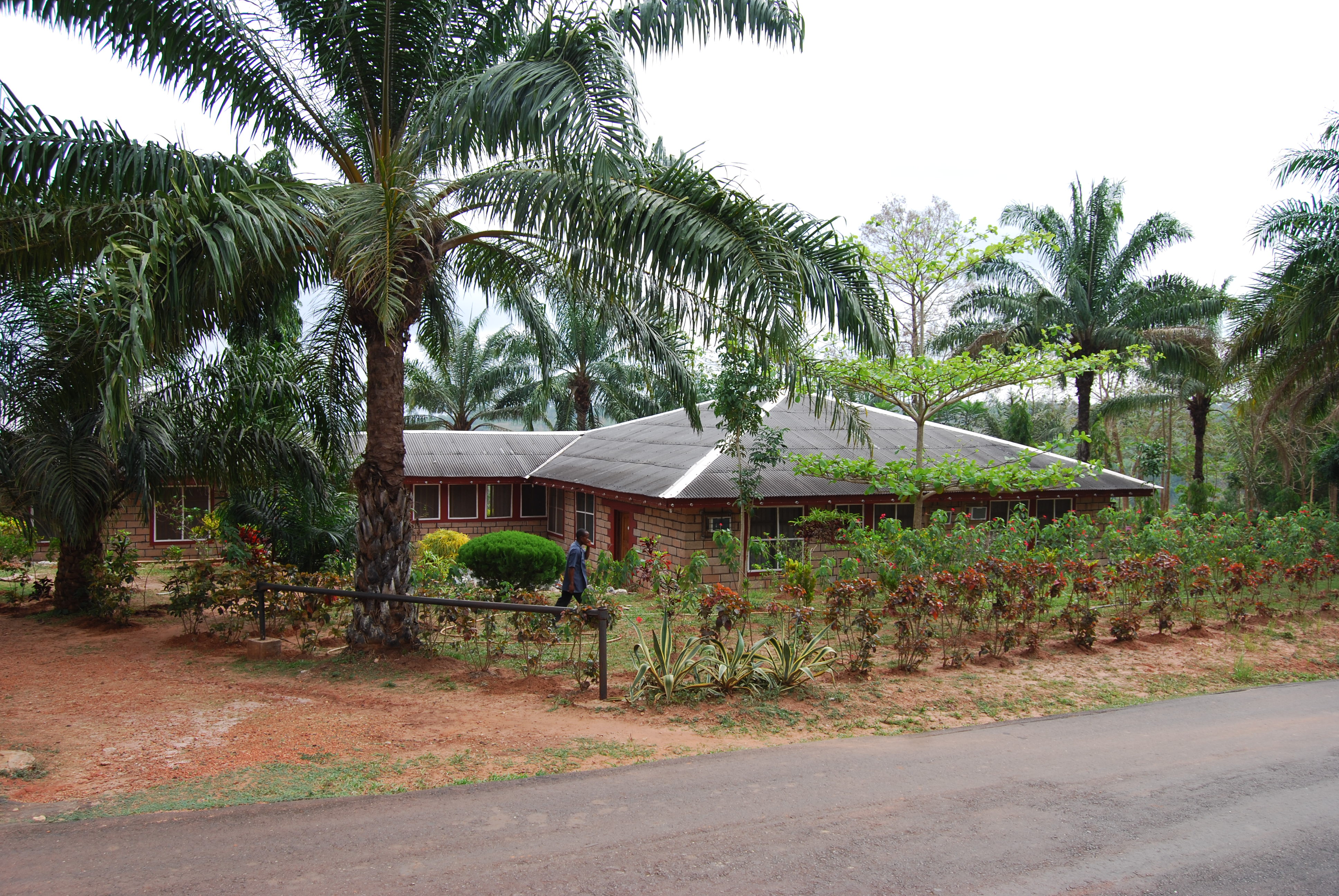
- Pax Herbal Center in Ewu-Esan
- Company type: Private
- Industry: Alternative medicine Products Manufacturing
- Founded: July 12, 1996; 29 years ago in Ewu-Esan, Edo State, Nigeria
- Founder: Adodo Anselm
- Headquarters: Ewu-Esan, Nigeria
- Number of locations: 1000 stores (2017)
- Area served: Africa; UK; U.S.A
- Key people: Peter Egwhrujakpor (Chairman); Anselm Adodo (CEO)
- Products: Capsules; Decoction; Tinctures
- Number of employees: ▲150 (2016); 155 (2017)
- Website: www.paxherbals.net

Paxherbals also known as Pax Herbal Clinic and Research Laboratories is a Nigerian alternative medicine product manufacturing company founded by Adodo Anselm in 1996 at Ewu Monastery.

The company adopted a science-based approach to its Traditional African medicine brand of alternative medicine by establishing three sets of science laboratories for its operations. This was with a view to diffusing the age-long bias associated with African herbal practices in Nigeria and in most parts of Africa which associated herbal medicine with witchcraft, sorcery, ritualism, paganism, and all sorts of fetish practices.

As of 2017, Paxherbals has a presence in 26 states out Nigeria's 36 states with a network of 1,000 alternative medicine product distributors. Thirty-three health products are certified by Nigerian National Agency for Food and Drug Administration and Control (NAFDAC). (Note: Certification by NAFDAC means certified products do not contain harmful substances. The certification does not certify product efficacy.)

== History ==
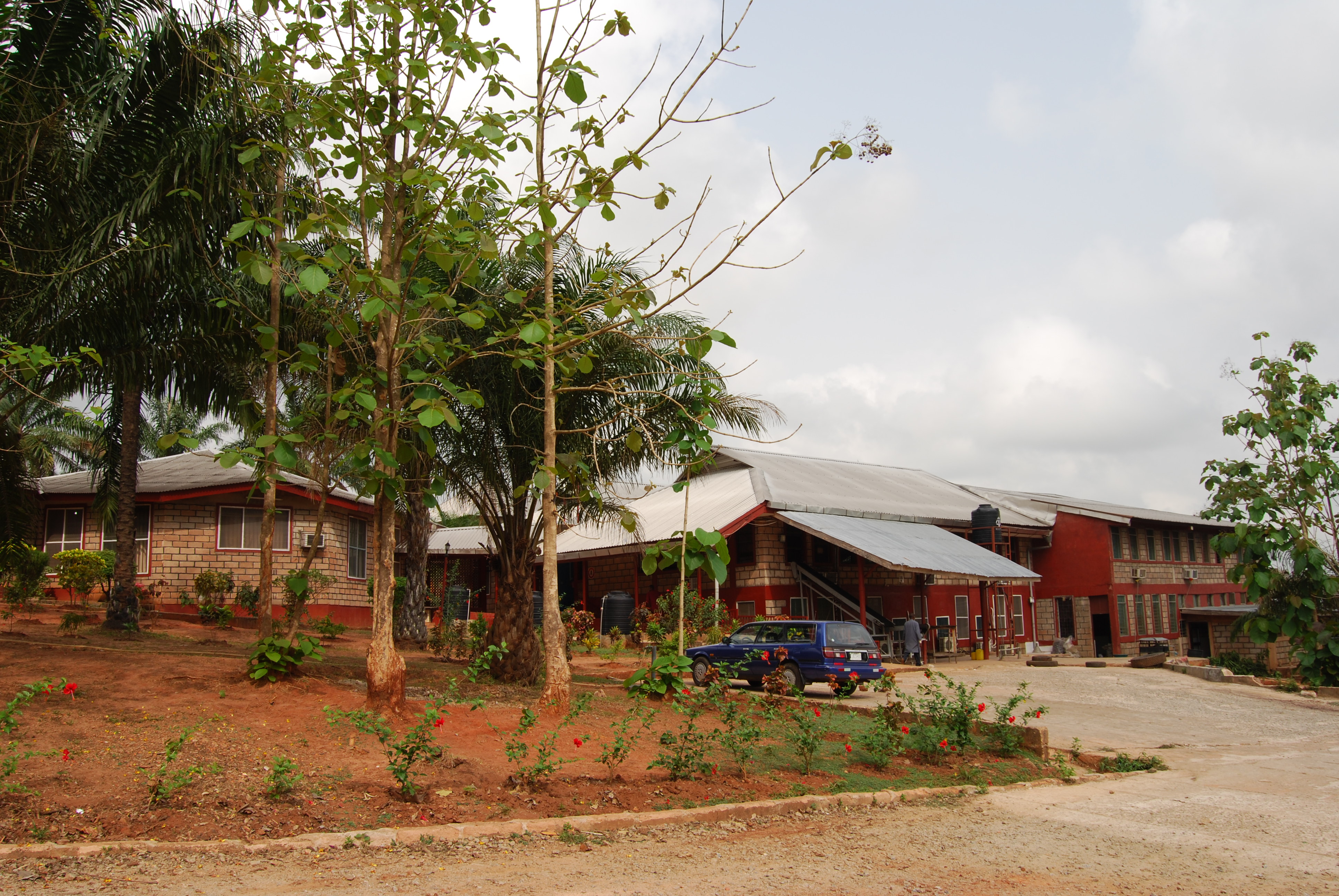
Pax Herbal Center complex

=== 1997 to 2007 ===
In 1997, the founder of Paxherbals (Adodo Anselm) started a small herbal garden in Ewu Monastery where he grew medicinal plants. The first herbal preparations from the herbal garden were used in making herbal remedies for common ailments like malaria and cough. A loan of about thirty thousand Nairas (NGN 40,000 or approx. $200) was used to build a three-room clinic where patients from nearby villages were attended to by Anselm and his first employee Gbogbo John. The three-room clinic soon came to be called Pax Herbal Center. By May 2006, Paxherbals have built a set of laboratories which was commissioned by Chief Lucky Igbinedion, Governor of Edo State (1999-2007). The laboratories include a quality control laboratory and microbiology laboratory. By 2008, Pax Herbal Clinic and Research Laboratories had become the biggest, best-equipped, best organized, and most modern herbal research center in Africa.

== Research ==
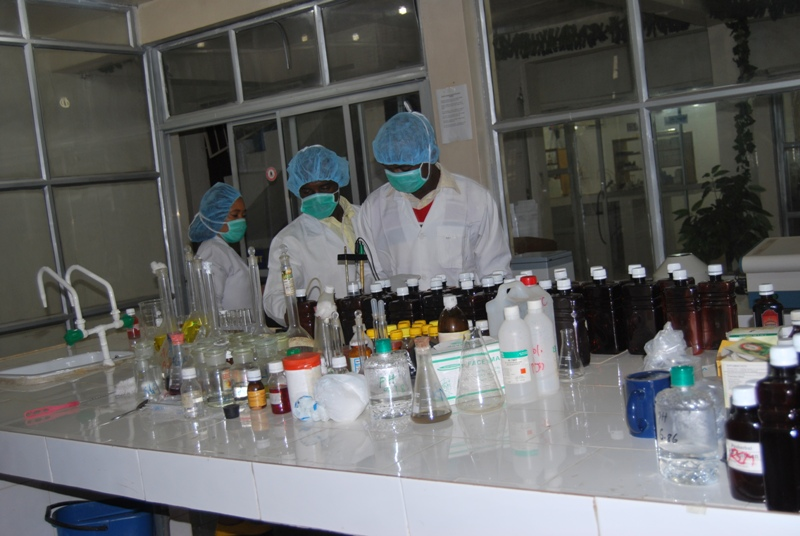
Paxherbal research and quality control laboratory

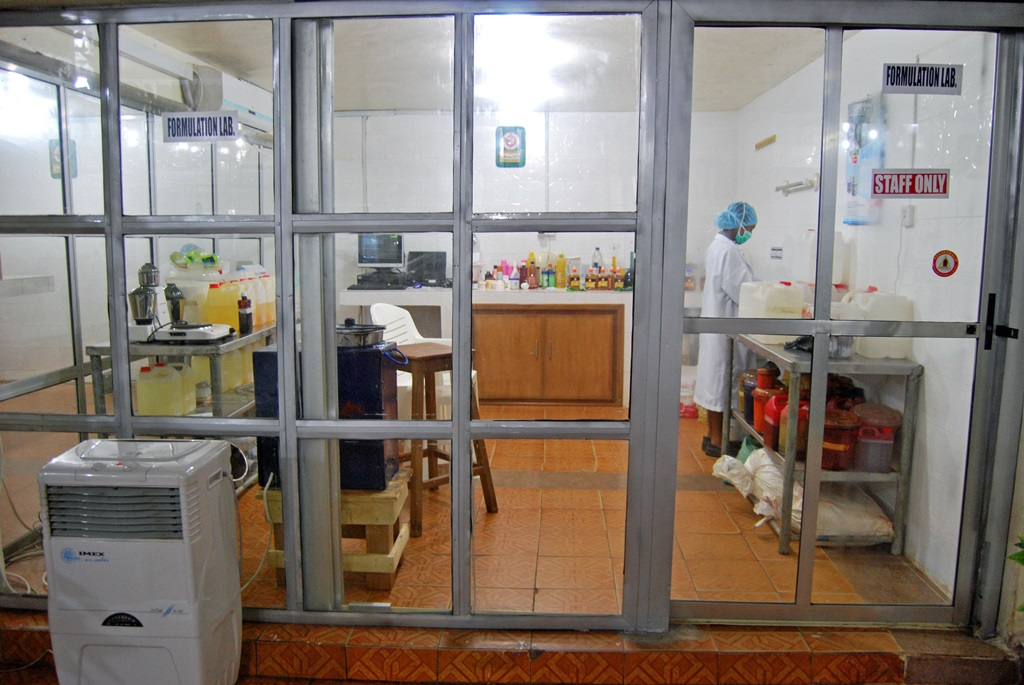
Paxherbals Product formulation laboratory

Poor regulation and insufficient research has always been the bane of herbal medicine practice in Africa. In order to change this narrative, Paxherbals created a research team which is a mixture of exogenous (pharmacists, botanists, pharmacologists, microbiologists, laboratory scientists and plant scientists) and the indigenous (traditional birth attendants, bone setters, local taxonomists, village historians, and chemists). The research team is headed by professor Okogun Joseph, who is the head of Scientific Research and Development.

=== With Institute of African Studies ===
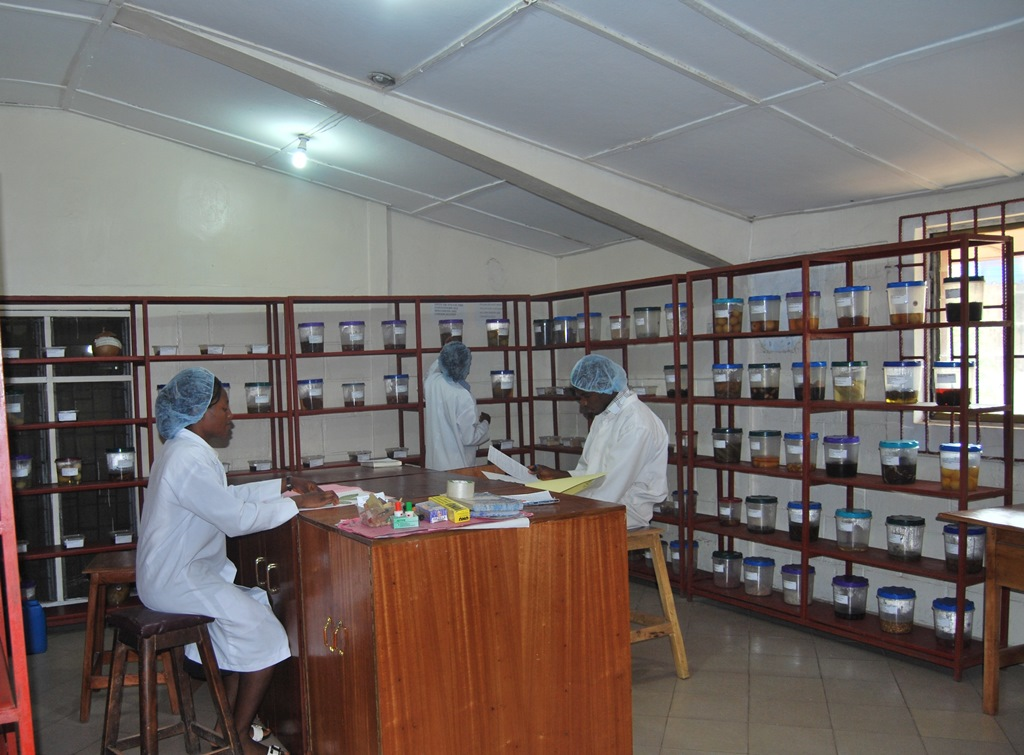
Paherbals herbarium laboratory

Paxherbals have formed a partnership with the Institute of African Studies (IAS) with the view of changing the way herbal medicine is learned and taught in Nigeria. With the university's curriculum committee approving a new curriculum, the university is open to admitting students for masters and Ph.D studies in Traditional African Medicine.

== Challenges ==
A major challenge to research effort at Paxherbals has been Nigerian government's regulations which requires that clinical trials have to be done in partnership with the government and so far, this have not proved possible until 2016 when some collaborative efforts was recorded.
