= Institute of African Studies, University of Nigeria =

Nigerian institution

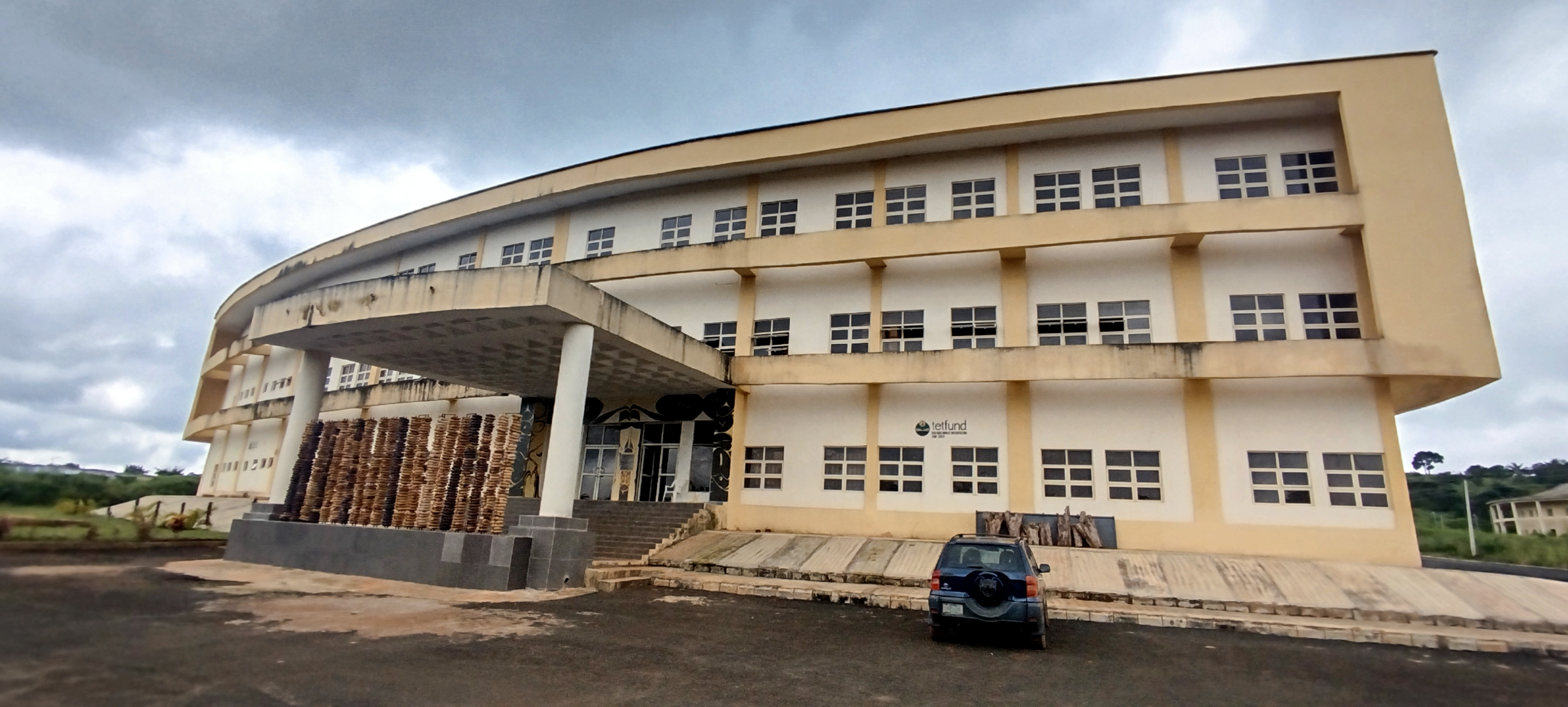
- Former names: Hansberry Institute
- Type: Research Institute
- Established: 1963
- Location: Nsukka, Enugu, Nigeria
- Campus: Suburban
- Website: https://ias.unn.edu.ng/

The Institute of African Studies at the University of Nigeria, formerly known as Hansberry Institute, is a graduate research institution of African, peace and conflict resolution studies. It is an interdisciplinary center, with previous directors of the institute coming from the fields of English, fine arts, religious studies and history.

== History ==
The institute was established in 1963 as a research center for African culture and to also function as a repository of oral and documented African history. At inception, during a period following the country's independence, the institute acted as an initiative to promote understanding of African cultural identity and also scholarly cooperation within the African diaspora. Its first director was William Leo Hansberry, who served as director while abroad. Hansberry was an African American historian and scholar who was also a former teacher of Nnamdi Azikiwe, one time premier of the Eastern Region.

Hansberry was succeeded in 1964 by Edward Blyden III and then Samuel Nwabara.

Between 1967 and 1970, Nigeria underwent civil strife, causing the institute to re-assess some of its goals. From 1970, the institute directed increased focus to the cultural identity of groups from the Southeastern region of Nigeria.

The author Chinua Achebe was a senior research fellow of the institute from 1967 to 1972. In the early 1970s, it began publishing Ikenga and Ikorok, the former a scholarly journal on African studies and the latter, a bulletin of activities and research of the institute (later renamed Ikoro).

In 1982, a salvage project was initiated to record and document practices and norms of the Igbo-speaking peoples of Southeastern Nigeria. This collection included traditional folklore, medical practices, food, clothing, and oral history.

== Activities ==
The institute organises the Chinua Achebe International Conference annually.

In February 2022, through the efforts of the then director, Ozioma Onuzulike, and the deputy director, Chima Korieh, the institute collaborated with the Nobel laureate (Economics), James A. Robinson and Maria Angélica Bautista of the Harris School of Public Policy, University of Chicago, US, to organise a conference and also transcode audio information in cassettes gathered from a previous Salvage ethnography project in 1983, with the aid of a grant.

== Facilities ==
- Cinematographic Unit
- Contemporary Arts Museum
- General Museum and Exhibitions
- Archives
- Library
- Documentation and research Publications Unit

== Past directors ==
- William Leo Hansberry
- Edward Blyden III
- Adiele Afigbo
- Chike Aniakor
- Uche Okeke
- Donatus Nwoga
- Osmond Enekwe
- Ogbu Kalu
- Emeka Nwabueze
- Florence Orabueze

== Gallery ==
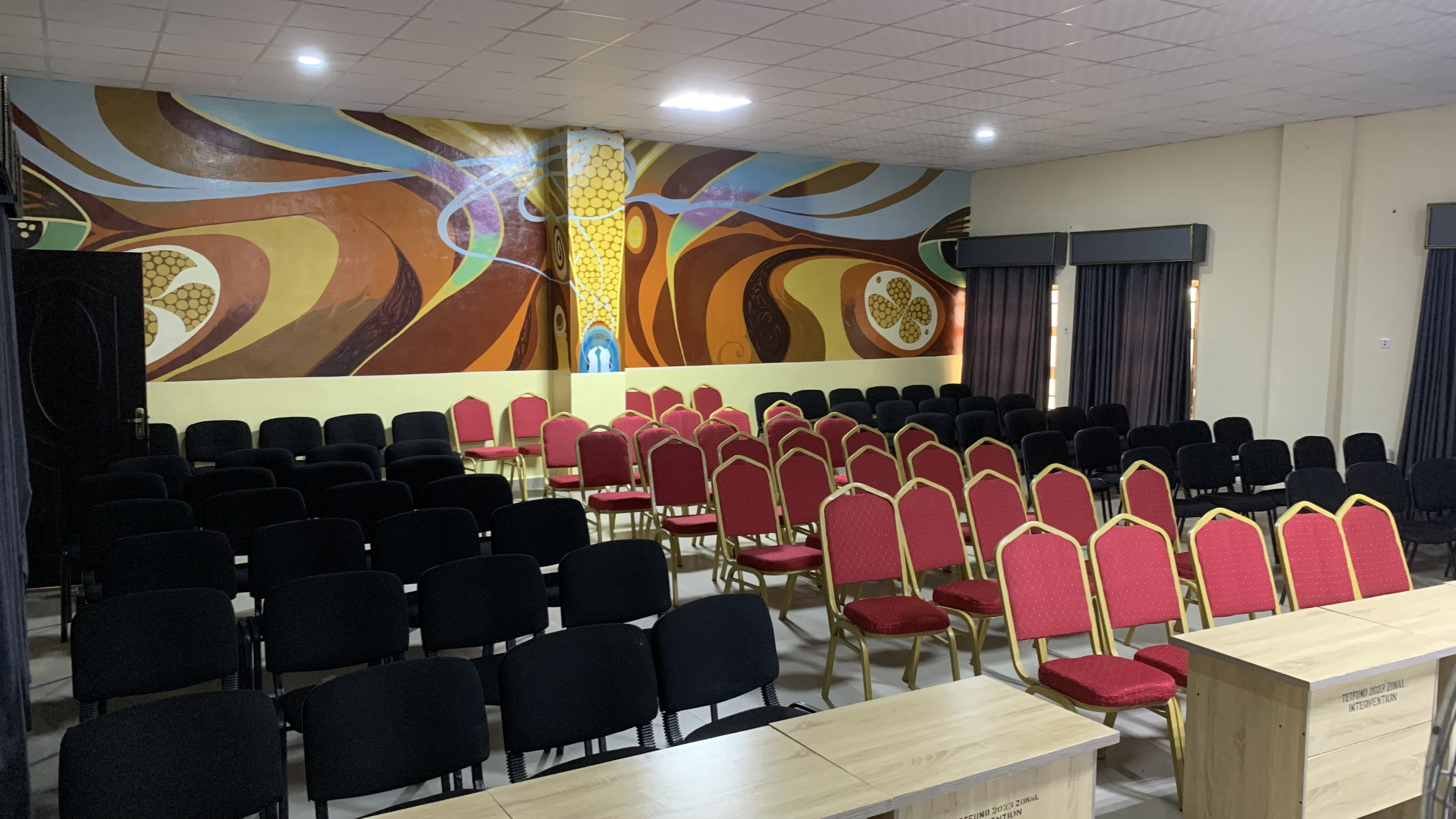

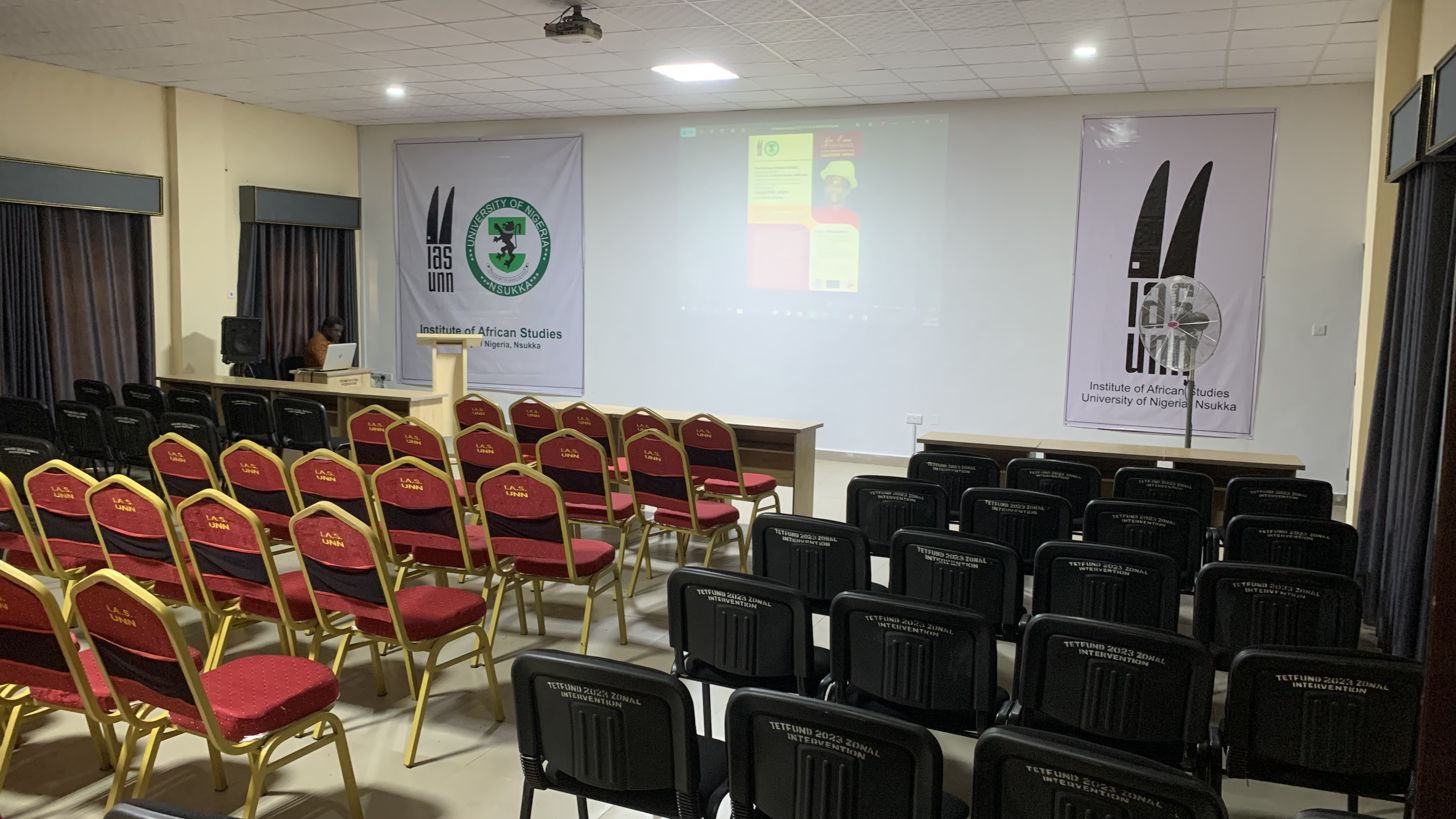

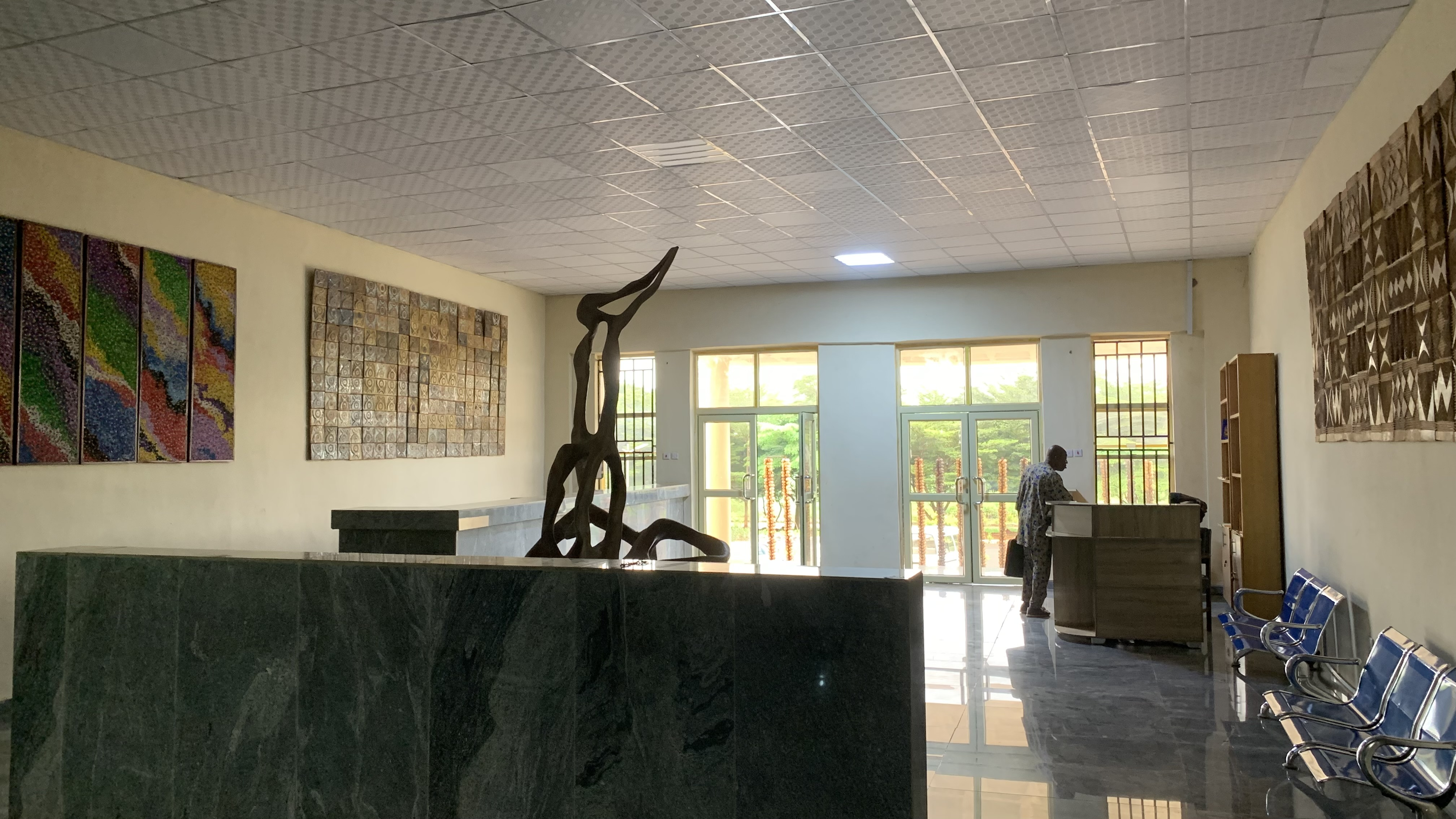

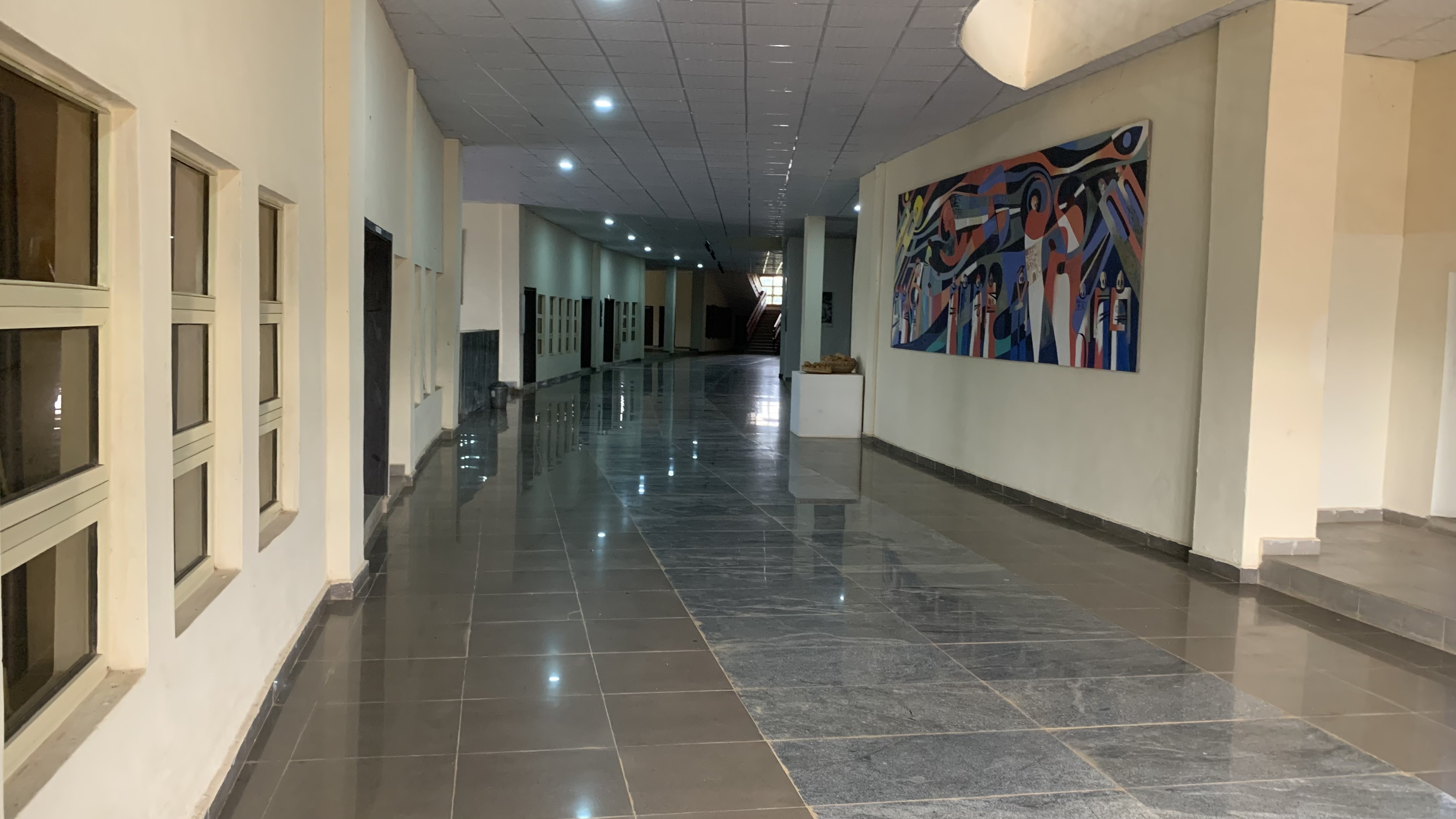

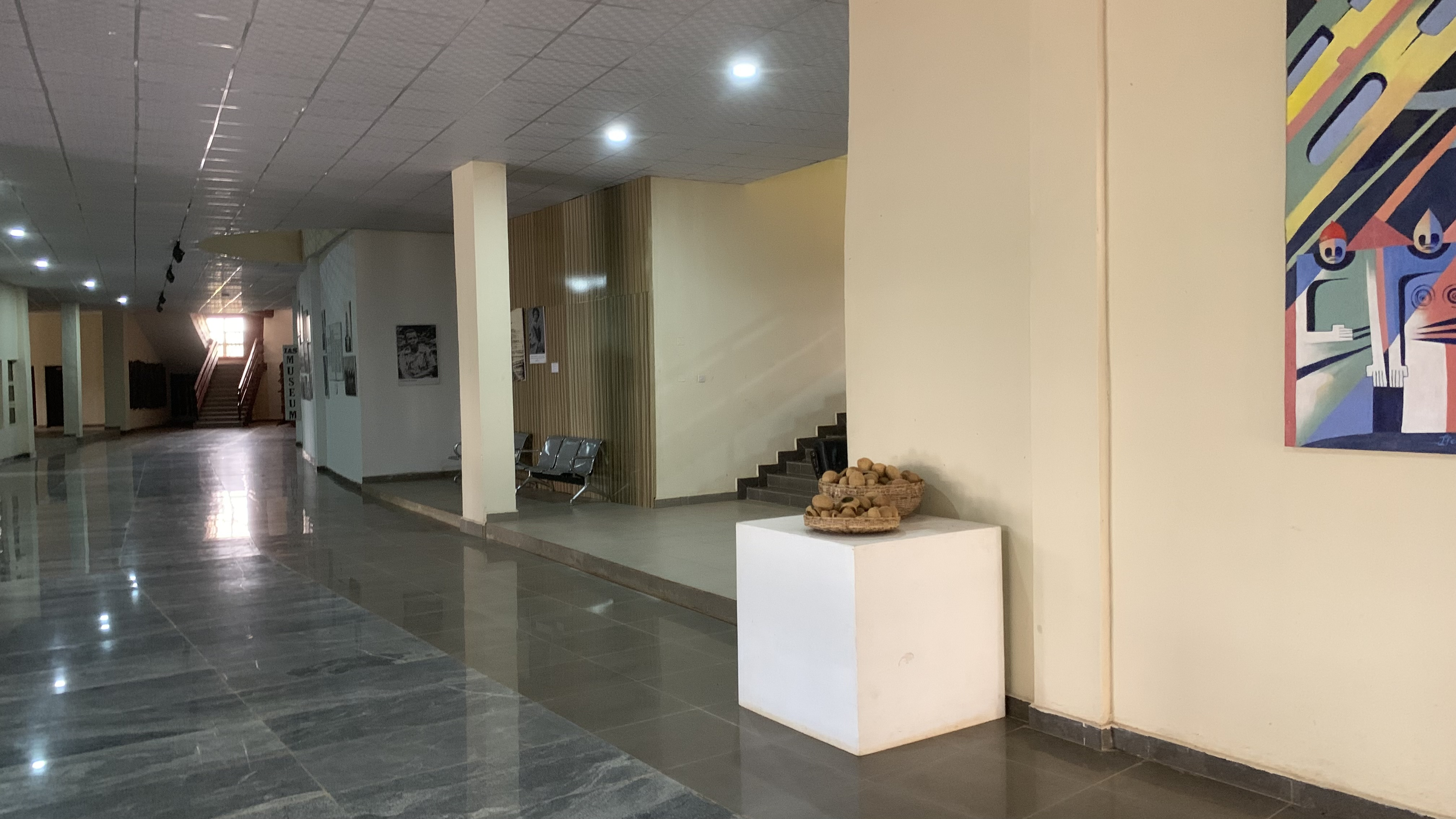

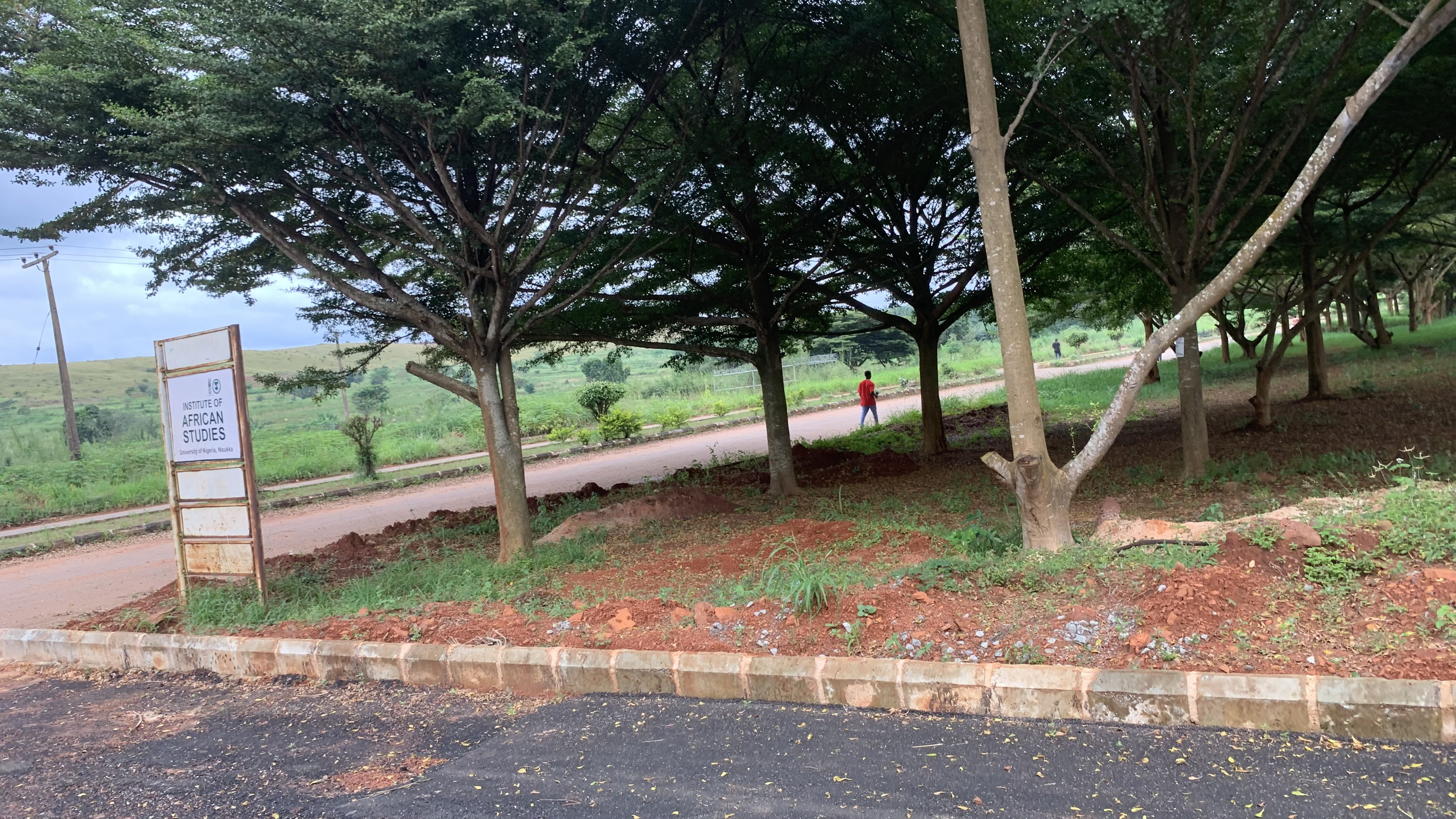

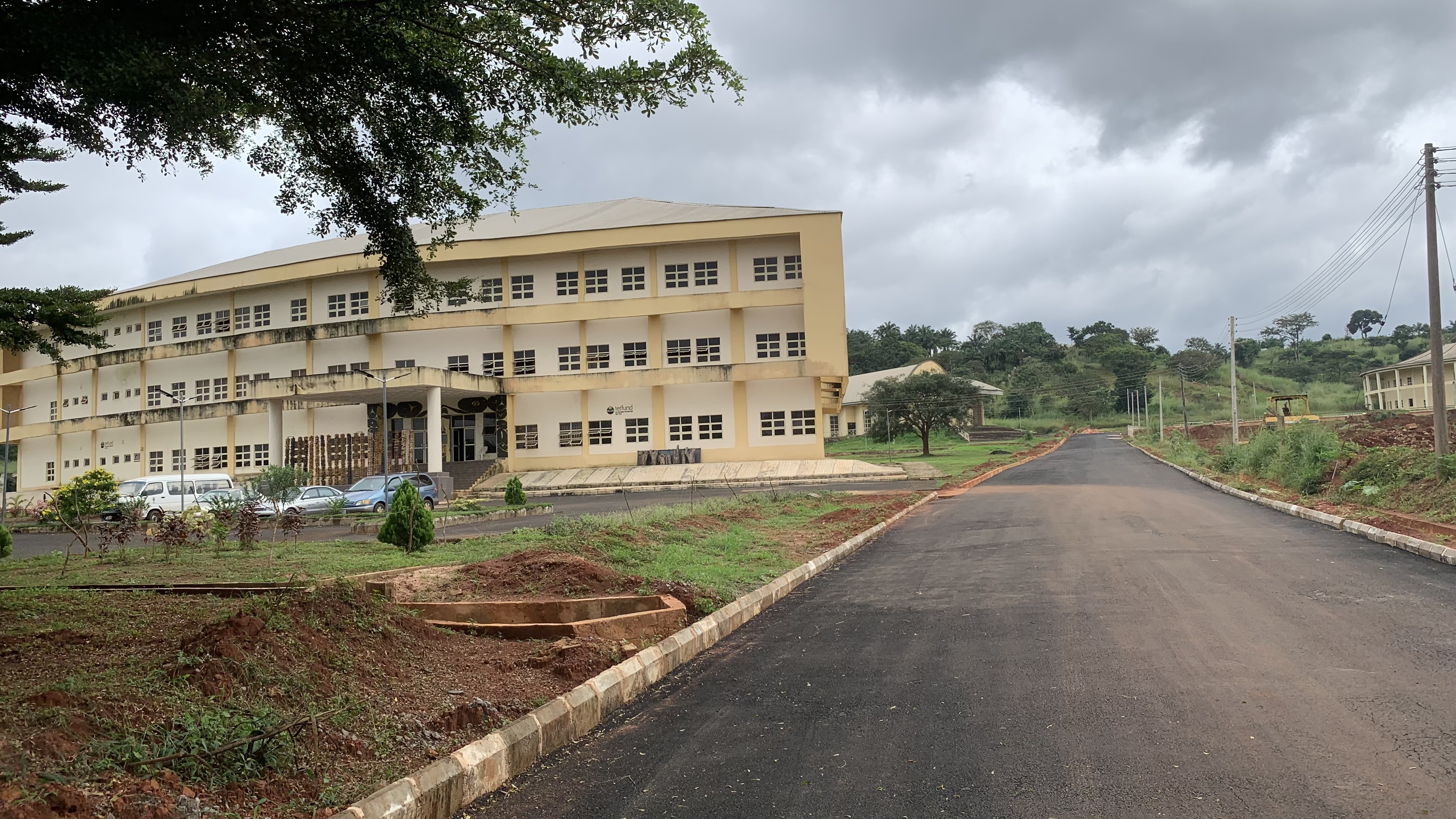
Photo galleries from the Institute of African Studies, UNN

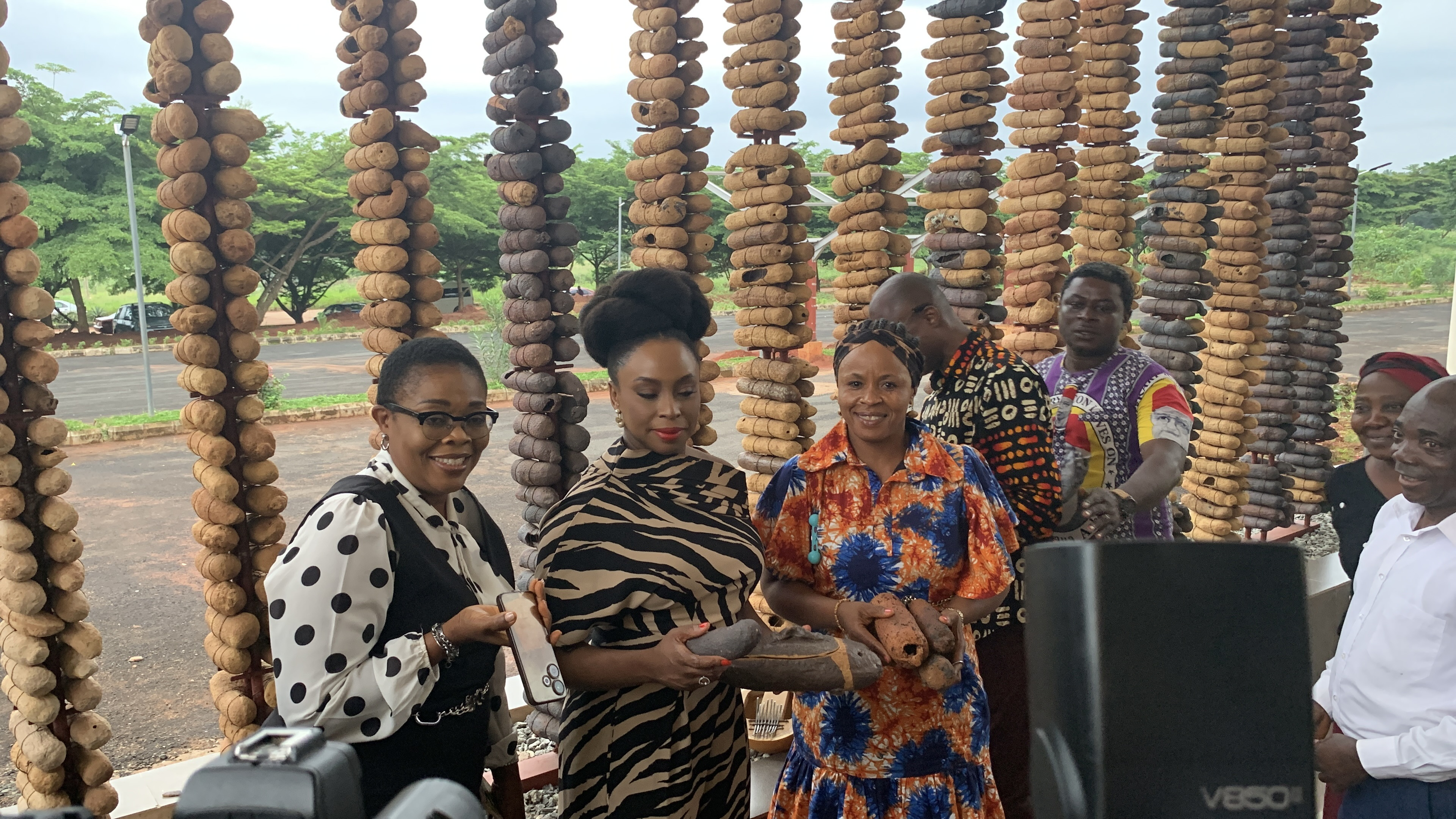
