= Amechi Akwanya =

Nigerian professor, priest, poet and novelist (born 1952)

Rev. Fr. Amechi Akwanya FNAL
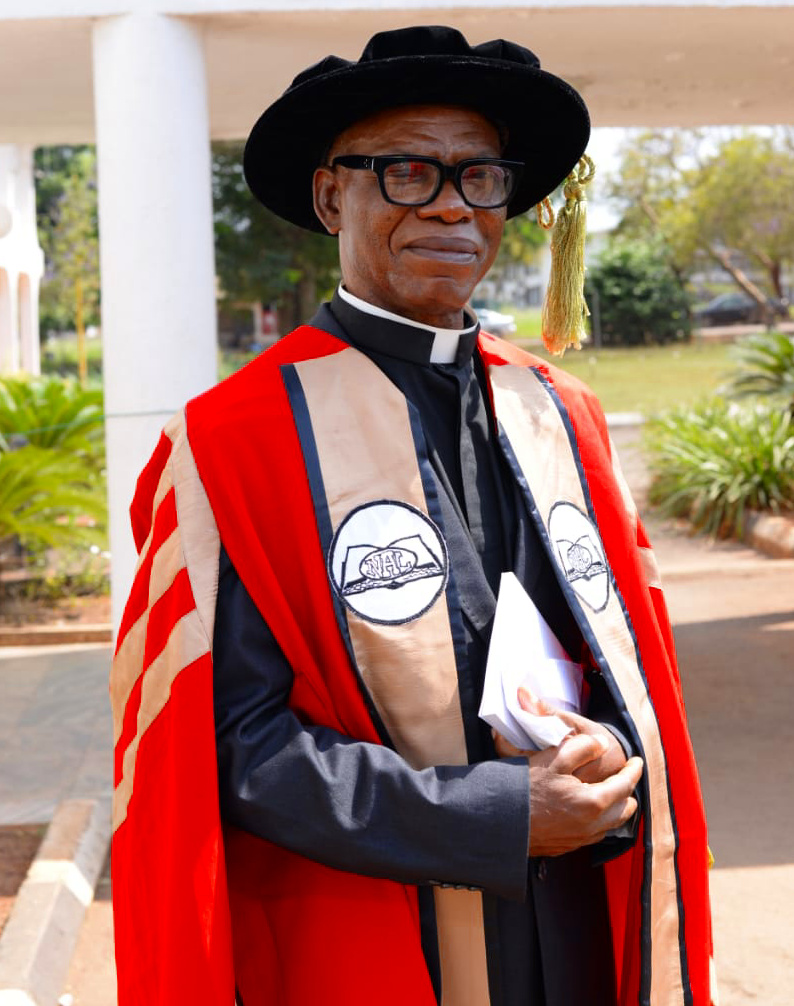
- Born: Nicholas Amechi Akwanya; December 1952 (age 73); Awkuzu, Oyi, Anambra State
- Occupations: Researcher, academic, author
- Known for: Orimili

Academic background
- Education: National University of Ireland (BA, MA and PhD)
- Thesis: Structuring and Meaning in the Nigerian Novel (1989)

Academic work
- Institutions: University of Nigeria, Nsukka

Nicholas Amechi Akwanya, FNAL is a Nigerian retired professor, priest, poet and a novelist. He was a former dean of Postgraduate studies of the University of Nigeria, Nsukka and a former head of department of English and Literary Studies of the institution. He is a fellow of Nigeria Academy of Letters.

== Early life and education ==
Akwanya was born on 6 December 1952 in Awkuzu, Oyi LGA of Anambra State. He attended his primary education in Akwuzu and he moved to Hallows Seminary, Onitsha. But during the civil war (1967–1970) Onitsha was taken by the federal forces, the school was moved to Awka-Etiti near Nnewi, and then Ukpor, south of Nnewi. In 1972 he began his philosophy studies in Bigard Memorial Major Seminary, Enugu. He later proceeded to Theology in 1976 and finished in 1980 with Priestly Ordination. In 1982 he was given an admission in the National University of Ireland where he bagged double Honours degree in English and Geography. He later obtained his master's degree in English in (1986), and finished his PhD in 1989 with a thesis entitled Structuring and Meaning in the Nigerian Novel.

In 2022 there are two published Festschrifts on Akwanya which include Literature and Literary Criticism in Nigeria: Essays on the Works of A.N. Akwanya edited by Mary JanePatrick N. Okolie & Ogochukwu Ukwueze, Shadows of Interstitial Life: Essays on African Literature in Honour of Rev. Fr. Professor Amechi N. Akwanya edited by Ignatius Chukwuma and Martin Okwoli Ogba.

== Career ==
In 1985 Akwanya was employed by the Department of English, St Patrick's College, Maynooth, Ireland as a graduate assistant. But he resigned and enrolled for his PhD in 1986. Upon the completion of his programme, he returned to Nigeria and took his first academic appointment as a lecturer II at the Department of English, University of Nigeria, Nsukka in 1991. In 1994 he became Lecturer I and in 1996, he was promoted to a Senior Lecturer. In 1999, he became a full professor.

On February 28, 2007, he delivered the seventeenth Inaugural Lecture of the University of Nigeria entitled, "English Language Learning in Nigeria: In Search of an Enabling Principle" It was later serialised in weekly installments in the Daily Champion newspaper pages 19, 58 and 89 of March 21, 2007 to May 2, 2007. He also delivered the 4th Valedictory Lecture of the University of Nigeria on December 1, 2022, entitled, "No Longer a Tribe: Chinua Achebe, the Novel, and Optimistic Postcoloniality". He retired from the University of Nigeria on 6 December 2022 and tn March 17, 2023, he was appointed Vicar General, Diocese of Aguleri.

== Administrative appointment ==
Akwanya was the Head of Department of English & Literary Studies, University of Nigeria from 2002 to 2005 and 2011 to 2013. From 2009 to 2011 he was appointed as the Dean of School of Postgraduate Studies and he was made an acting Vice-Chancellor, University of Nigeria, Nsukka, from 19 to 21 October 2009.

== Editorship of academic periodicals ==
Akwanya served as consulting editor to Nsukka Journal of the Humanities in 2018; A Journal of Language and Literature (AJOLL) in 2017; IBADAN Journal of English Studies (IBJES); Africa and world Literature in 2007, and, JONASS: Journal of the Nigerian Association for Semiotic Studies in the same year.

In 1992 Ossie Enekwe invited Amechi Akwanya to become assistant editor of Okike: An African Journal of New Writing (which was earlier founded by Prof. Chinua Achebe in 1971 and later handed over to Enekwe in 1984). When Enekwe retired in 2010, he handed over the editorship of Okike to Akwanya. There have been more than thirteen issues of the Journal since then.

== Awards and honours ==
In 2004 he was awarded the Most Dedicated Staff Award of the University of Nigeria, Nsukka and the Most Innovative Head of Department Award, by English Students Association. In 2007, he was listed in The Nigerian Book of Great People.

== Research areas and contributions ==
Akwanya research focuses on discourse theory or discourse studies, literary theory and criticism, study of language, African & European literatures and semantics. His research contribution in literary studies stems from functionalism and axiomatic functionalist linguistics as sketched out by Sandor W.F. Mulder by focusing on literary theory and literary discourse analysis. This came to light with his 1996 edition of his Semantics and Discourse: Theories of Meaning and Textual Analysis. He also elaborated a theory of literary discourse analysis based on André Martinet's notion that ‘function is the criterion of linguistic reality’ to the effect that the function that determines literature is art.

== Fellowship and membership ==
He is a Fellow of the institute of Industrial Administration (FIIA). In 2012 he became an Honorary Fellow, Institute of Certified Professional Managers of Nigeria. In the same year, he became a Fellow of the International Academy of Management. In 2015, he became a Fellow of the Nigerian Academy of Letters (FNAL) and in 2022 he was made Papal Chamberlain, an entitled Monsignor.

== Selected publications ==
- Orimili (1991)
- Chinua Achebe's Writing: An Investment in Speech (1989).
- Semantics and Discourse: Theories of Meaning and Textual Analysis.
- Verbal Structures: Studies in the Nature and Organizational Patterns of Literary Language.
- Communication Skills: Needs Analysis,’ in Common Frontiers in Communication Skills: Focus on the Nigerian University System.
- Discourse Analysis and Dramatic Literature.
- Official Language Policy and the Decline in the Standard of Language Use.
- Language and Habits of Thought
- The Criticism of African Literature. Major Themes in African Literature
- Pilgrim Foot: A Collection of Poems.
