= Ossie Enekwe =

Nigerian educator, dramatist, novelist, poet (1942–2010)

Professor Ossie Enekwe
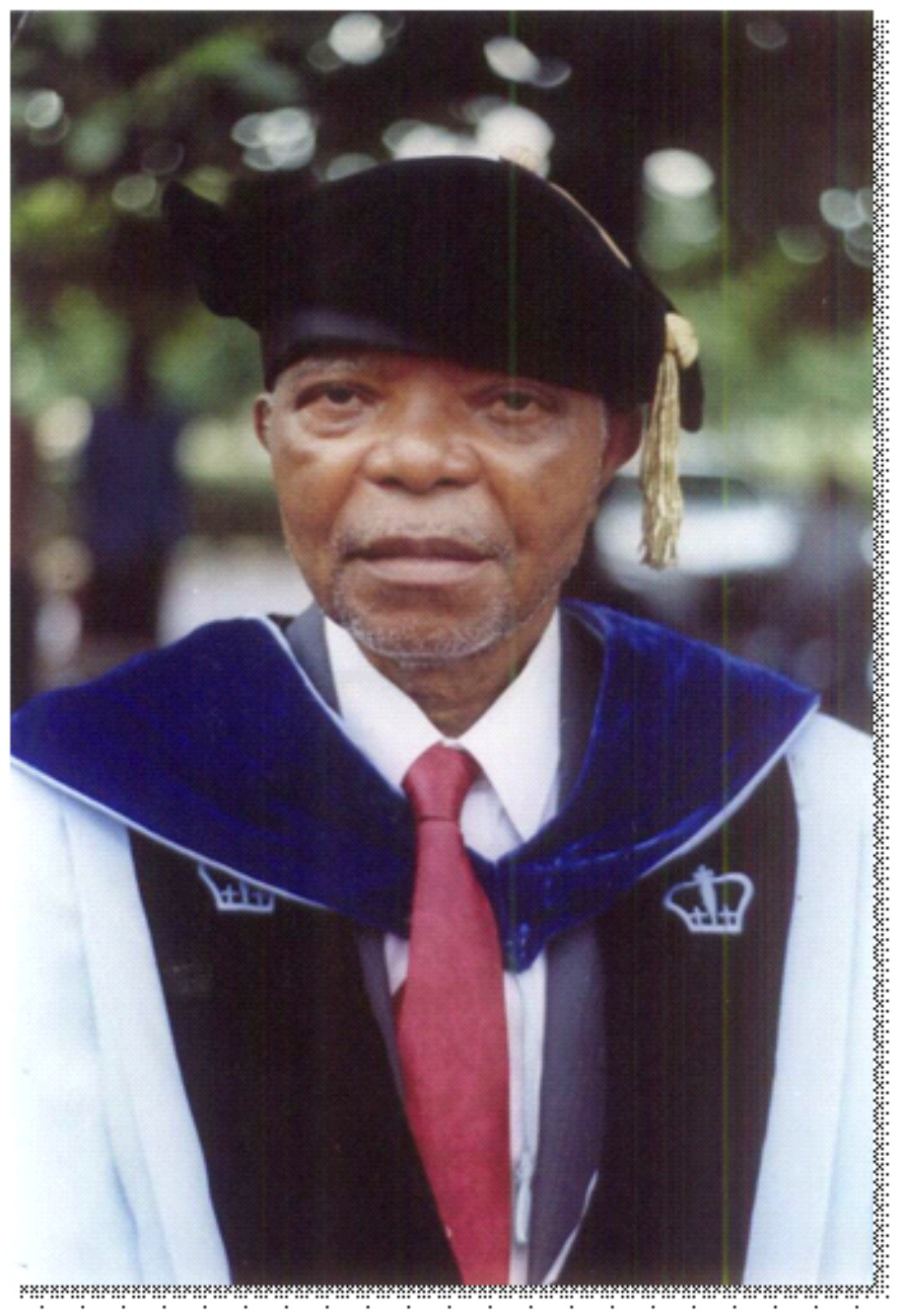
- Born: Onuora Osmond Enekwechi; 12 November 1942; Affa, Udi LGA, Enugu State, Nigeria
- Died: 29 April 2010 (aged 67)
- Education: University of Nigeria (B.A.); Columbia University (M. Phil and PhD)
- Occupations: Dramatist; poet; novelist; professor
- Spouse: Josephine Chioma Enekwe (née Adinde)
- Children: 7
- Writing career
- Notable works: Igbo Masks: The Oneness of Ritual and Theatre (1987)

Ossie Enekwe, born Onuora Osmond Enekwechi (12 November 1942 – 29 April 2010), was a Nigerian dramatist, poet, novelist, and professor of theatre arts.

He was a former vice president of the Association of Nigerian Authors (ANA), as well as the former director of the Institute of African Studies at the University of Nigeria in Nsukka (1998–2004). He helped to establish the University of Nigeria's Dramatic Arts Department.

Enekwe was the editor of Okike: The African Journal of New Writing from 1984 to 2010, after being appointed by its founder, Chinua Achebe, who founded it in 1971. When Enekwe retired in 2010, he handed over the editorship of Okike to Amechi Akwanya.

== Early life and education ==
Ossie Enekwe was born on 12 November 1942, at Affa in Udi LGA, Enugu State, to Albert Nkomatolu Enekwe's family.

He began formal education at St. Patrick's School, Ogbette, Enugu, in 1949, continuing till 1952, and again from 1955 to 1957. He then attended Holy Ghost School, Ogui, Enugu, 1953; St. Mary's School, Uwani, Enugu, 1954; Trinity High School, Oguta, 1958–62 and the University of Nigeria, Nsukka, 1964–72.

Enekwe became a Foundation Scholar after gaining admission to the department of English in the Faculty of Arts of the university, and, he was refunded his first year school fees and had his subsequent school fees paid by the university. As an undergraduate student, he quite often went around campus with a guitar slugged to his shoulders.

During 1963–64, he worked as a clerk in the third class at the Ministry of Local Government in Enugu. The following year, he established a music club named "Kiss Me Quick" and had already started appearing on Enugu TV in the series Ossie Melody. Enekwe was part of the Eastern Nigeria Theatre Group from 1963 to 1967.

Starting in 1966, and until the outbreak of the Nigerian Civil War, he served as a literature freelancer for the Christian Radio, Enugu. This radio station was affiliated with UTLF, the Voice of the Gospel station in Addis Ababa, Ethiopia.

During the Nigerian Civil War that spanned from 1967 until January 1970, Enekwe was employed in one of Biafra's branches and was frequently spotted playing the guitar in order to offer solace to both troops and refugees. It was during this time that he developed a close relationship with and was mentored by Achebe.

As a student in 1970, Enekwe founded the Oak Theatre, a performing arts group that is mentioned in The Cambridge Guide to World Theatre, edited by Martin Banham. He invited his superior, Prof. Kalu Uka, who was then the head of department, to serve as the director of the drama group.

Enekwe completed his studies in the Department of English at UNN with Second Class Honours, Upper Division in 1971. He quickly secured a position as an English master at St. Peter's College in Achina, Anambra, Nigeria. Later that same year, he was appointed a Junior Research Fellow at the Department of English at the University of Nigeria, Nsukka.

== Early career ==
Starting from 1972, Enekwe took up postgraduate studies at Columbia University, New York, and was awarded a writing fellowship. During his time there, Enekwe played a key role in establishing the Columbia Reader in 1974, serving as the first editor. Further, he collaborated with The Greenfield Review to prepare the 14th Annual African Poetry issue.

Enekwe earned multiple degrees from Columbia, including an MFA in writing (1974), M.Phil. in theatre (1977) and finally, a PhD in theatre (1982). His doctoral thesis portrays the organic connection between ritual and theatre. The thesis was published as a book entitled Igbo Masks: The Oneness of Ritual and Theatre (1987). The book is listed by UNESCO as a classic text in anthropology.

Enekwe was a teacher and scholar in the fields of creative writing, drama, and literature for more than thirty years. He taught at the University of Nigeria and various educational institutions in the United States. Throughout his teaching career, he held different positions, including Junior Research Fellow at the Department of English, University of Nigeria, Nsukka; Adjunct Lecturer in African-American Literature at the City University of New York (1973–76) and Fairleigh Dickinson University in New Jersey, USA (1977). He was also an Associate in African-American Literature at Columbia University in New York (1977–78) and rose through the ranks from Lecturer 1 (1978) to Senior Lecturer in the English Department at the University of Nigeria, Nsukka in 1980.

The drama program at the University of Nigeria was initially housed within the Department of English, where it was taught as a form of literature. In 1975, when Enekwe was pursuing a Master of Philosophy degree at Columbia University, he was invited by Dr. D.I. Nwoga, the Head of the Department of English at the University of Nigeria, to return to his alma mater. The request was also backed by Prof. Emmanuel N. Obiechina and Achebe, who encouraged Enekwe to help establish a new Sub-Department of Dramatic Arts. Despite Bernard Beckerman's efforts to retain him, Enekwe resigned from his position at Columbia as a sign of respect for his academic mentors. He returned to the University of Nigeria in 1978 and, together with Dr. J.N. Amankulor, Mr. Kalu Uka (now Prof. Kalu Uka), and Dom Asomba, developed the curriculum for the new Sub-Department, which became an independent entity separate from the Department of English in the 1982/83 academic year.

Amankulor was the first co-ordinator of the Sub-Department (1983–1986). Enekwe was appointed the Coordinator of Dramatic Arts at the University of Nigeria, Nsukka in 1986 until 1989. The Sub-Department was eventually elevated to a full department in 2004.

== Stage direction/theatre productions ==
Many of Enekwe's days were spent in theatre practice and scholarship. In 1980, the Department of English, under Achebe, gave him full support for the Oak Theatre production of Shakespeare's Macbeth with which Enekwe's team toured secondary schools in the Eastern States of Nigeria. Earlier, it had been staged for the 1980 convocation of the University of Nigeria.

In 1984, Enekwe directed The Trial of Dedan Kimathi by Ngugi wa Thiong’o and Micere Mugo, as a convocation play for the University of Nigeria. Impressed by the production, the then-Vice-Chancellor, Prof. Frank Nwachukwu Ndili, with the support of Alhaji Ali Mungono, the then-Pro-Chancellor, gave Enekwe's troupe full financial and logistic support, which made it possible for them to perform in the major higher institutions, including the University of Benin, Obafemi Awolowo University, Ile-Ife, the University of Ibadan, the University of Lagos, and the University of Port Harcourt.

The troupe also performed in Abuja Capital Territory, under the ministerial control of late General Mamman Vatsa. So, the production of The Trial of Dedan Kimathi that Enekwe directed was the first modern theatre production in Abuja, Capital Territory. In his remarks, Vatsa said that the production would assure Nigerians of the reality of Abuja Capital Territory. In a report of the Sub-Department of Dramatic Arts to the Justice Robert Okara-led visitation panel, the then-Coordinator of the Sub-Department Amankulor, stated:

In 1983/84 session, our production of the play, The Trial of Dedan Kimathi, directed by Dr Onuora Ossie Enekwe hit the headlines within the country and abroad as a very successful and meaningful African drama. Its positive lessons in patriotism and nationalism were widely acknowledged, as well as its artistic excellence.

Before the exodus of talented theatre scholars and practitioners, such as late Prof. J. N. Amankulor, Kalu Uka (now Professor Kalu Uka), Dr. Chimalum Nwankwo, Esiaba Irobi, Eni-Jones Umuko and Osy Okagbue, and others, the Sub-Department of Dramatic Arts was a beehive, presenting a wide variety of plays that touched on various theatre traditions, allowing members to fulfil themselves.

Academic staff and students participated as actors, actresses, etc. in the productions. In those years, they had regular productions at noon, under the name Noon Theatre, in the Paul Robeson Building where students practised what they were taught. They were encouraged to write plays, direct them or play any other relevant roles.

In 1997 and 1998, the troupe went on two very successful tours, on invitation by the Shell Petroleum Club in Warri, to stage Enekwe's Dance of Restoration, directed by Felix Egwuda, and Esiaba Irobi's Nwokedi, directed by Oyibo Eze.

Enekwe undertook many performance tours. His directing credits include Wole Soyinka's The Trial of Brother Jero, Jewels of the Shrine by Ene Henshaw, The Trial of Dedan Kimathi by Ngugi Wa Thiong'o and Micere Mugo, which was the first modern professional theatre production in Abuja, Nigerian capital city. He has also directed Edward Albee's The Zoo Story, Shakespeare's Macbeth, The Marriage of Anasewa by Efua Sutherland, as well as his own poem, Marching to Kilimanjaro.

Two dance troupes he had worked with have toured the United States and Europe. He equally wrote and choreographed many dance dramas, one of which was first performed at Colgate University, Hamilton, New York, in 1992, and at the Shell Club, Warri, Nigeria, in 1997.

He was the consultant director of the University of Nigeria Comedy Squad. Enekwe's drama productions attest to his creative imagination and directoral procedure informed by attention to details.

== Academic/literary contributions ==
Enekwe was made a full professor of theatre arts in 1988. After many years of application to the Postgraduate School of the University of Nigeria, the MA, PhD and D.Phil. programmes of theatre arts which Enekwe designed were approved.

He had an abiding interest in African, African-American literatures. His poems and short stories have appeared in major literary anthologies worldwide, notable of which are Almanakh Africa (1982); African Rhapsody: Short Stories of Contemporary African Experience (1974); Dobsirao Moi Nigeria Koltok (Lament of the Drums); Contemporary Nigerian Poets (1977); An Anthropology of Contemporary African Poetry (1993).

Enekwe's "Happy Baby" is the model poem in Ghana Senior Secondary School English, Book 1, published for the Government of Ghana by the Oxford University Press (1991). Many of his short fictions and poems have been translated into French, Italian, Spanish, Serbian, Hungarian and many other languages. He is listed amongst editorial consultants in many journals, local and international, and his lectures and scholarly writings have inspired a great number of people.

In 1984, Achebe appointed Enekwe the editor of Okike: An African Journal of New Writing; Achebe had founded the journal in 1971. When Enekwe retired in 2010, he handed over the editorship of Okike to Akwanya.

His Theories of Dance in Nigeria (1991) unraveled many salient and hidden features of theatrical and dance practices. Enekwe argued for the existence of traditional African theatre as against the widely held view in the western world of its non-existence. He points to a large and vast existence of traditional groups outside the stage of the elitist audience in western permeated circles in Nigeria. His works demonstrated versatility of craft that manipulates ironies and dramatic actions to startling aesthetic effects. His creative and literary talents elucidated African literature and literary criticism.

Enekwe dedicated his life to the pursuit of academic excellence and nation building through committed theatre. He conceptualized an African theatre that is markedly different from Aristotelian postulations using the Igbo masking tradition. He has through his numerous works, especially his study of Igbo masks, which resulted in the unity of ritual and theatre as one, contributed a lot in the area of theatre scholarship. The work is regarded as one of the best in the field of Igbo scholarship. Enekwe was in the forefront of the movement for an independent African aesthetics freed from western theoretical conditions and prejudices that precludes the admission of African contributions in the evolution of theatre, literature and world cultures. Enekwe had left indelible marks in his various works that dot books and reputable journals. His services to learning, especially dramatic arts and poetry, are vast.

In September 2007, Enekwe delivered the 25th Inaugural Lecture of the University of Nigeria, Nsukka entitled, "Beyond Entertainment: A Reflection on Drama and Theatre".

In 2008, GMT Emezue edited a Festschrift-like book entitled, Critical Approaches (Volume Two): Onuora Ossie Enekwe. The book concentrates on the Enekwe's works, assessing the maturation of his craft and analysing the contents of his writings.

== Administrative appointments/ establishments ==
Aside his creative expressions, Enekwe had time for serving in many capacities for the development of higher education in Nigeria. He was the chairman, Governing Council, College of Education, Eha Amufu, Enugu State, Nigeria (1987–1989), and, Associate Dean of Arts, University of Nigeria, Nsukka. He strengthened these institutions and laid solid foundations for more rapid expansion in facilities and in student and faculty population. He was founding chairman of the University of Nigeria Transport Routes Implementation Committee.

Enekwe established the first individual multi-disciplinary research centre at the University of Nigeria, Nsukka. The Enekwe Research Centre, which holds rare and contemporary collections, has continued to assist students and researchers of various categories.

As director of the Institute of African Studies of the University of Nigeria, Nsukka, a position he held from 1998 to 2004, Enekwe raised the tone of research at the institute, by rejuvenating research infrastructure, and encouraging more adventurous research commitments.

Enekwe was on the national panel of experts on community theatre for social mobilization from 1981 to 1988, and he was a member of the Federal Government Planning Committee for International Symposium for African Literature in honour of Prof. Wole Soyinka. He was also president of the Okigbo Poetry Club in the University of Nigeria, Nsukka. He ran a regular column in the Sunday Punch newspapers from 1987 to 1989. From 1988 to 1991, he was the vice president of the Association of Nigerian Authors.

== Awards ==
His awards include:

- University of Nigeria Junior Research Fellowship
- Columbia University Writing Fellowship
- East-Central State Scholarship

He won the Silver Gong Prize for Dramatized Poetry in English at the 6th National Festival of Arts in Maiduguri in 1983, as well as the Silver Gong Prize for his short story, War in the Head.

As an English and dramatic arts teacher, he motivated his students to aspire to academic heights with focus.

== Later years ==
Enekwe was made editor-in-chief emeritus of the Okike journal in 2006 by Achebe.

== Personal life ==
Enekwe was a devoted Christian. He was a member of the Christian Men Organization, Laity Council and Legion of Mary of St. Peter's Chaplaincy, UNN. He carried out legionary works along with his friend, Prof. Onukogu. He was a member of the Knight of St. Molumba, Nigeria. Enekwe was known to have visited motherless babies homes quite often. In page three of Gentle Birds, Come to Me, he said:

The sun smiles in the sky, it is time to rise and go, no reason to sigh, no cause to say no.

Enekwe married Josephine Chioma Enekwe (née Adinde) in 1974 and they had six daughters (Uche, Chinwe, Chioma, Ginika, Olivia and Sylvia) and a son (Osinachi Albert Enekwe) and many grandchildren.

He died on 29 April 2010.

== Works ==
- Wole Soyinka as Novelist (1975)
- The Modern Nigerian Theatre: What Tradition? (1978)
- Broken Pots (1977)
- Come Thunder (1984)
- Minstrelsy in Igboland (2002)
- The Last Battle and Other Stories (1996)
- Theories of Dance in Nigeria: An Introduction (1991)
- Broken Humanity
- Igbo Masks: The Oneness of Ritual and Theatre (1987)
- The Betrayal in Two Experimental Plays (1992)
- Trails in the Mines: The Life and Works of Edmund B.O. Nwasike (2000)
- Marching to Kilimanjaro (2005)
- Gentle Birds, Come to Me (2007)
