= Ewu Monastery =

Roman Catholic monastery in Ewu-Esan, Nigeria

- Location within Nigeria
- Interactive map of Ewu Monastery

Monastery information
- Full name: Ewu Monastery
- Other names: Ewumonastery; Benedictines Ewu; Ewu Benedictines; Monks of Ewu; St. Benedict Monastery Ewu
- Order: Order of Saint Benedict
- Established: July 11, 1979
- Mother house: Glenstal Abbey
- Dedication: Mary, mother of Jesus
- Diocese: Catholic Diocese of Uromi

People
- Founders: Dom Augustine O'Sullivan OSB; Dom Columba Breen OSB
- Prior: DOM Egwhrujakpor Peter OSB
- Archbishop: Augustine Akubueze
- Bishop: Donatus Ogun OSA
- Important associated figures: Father Prior

Site
- Location: Ewumonastery road off Ekpoma-Auchi expressway, Ewu-Esan, Edo State
- Country: Nigeria
- Coordinates: 6°12′07.7″N 6°15′07.8″E
- Public access: Open to people of all faith
- Website: www.ewumonks.org

Ewu Monastery is a Nigerian Roman Catholic Church monastery belonging to the Order of Saint Benedict located in Ewu-Esan in Edo State of Nigeria. The monastery was established on July 11, 1979 by Dom Augustine O'Sullivan and Dom Columaba Breen of Glenstal Abbey.

== History ==
The Abbot and members of the monastic community of St. Columba Abbey, Murroe, Ireland in 1969 wanted to establish a new monastic foundation at that point in their history. After unsuccessful attempts to establish a monastic community in South America (Uruguay) and East Africa (Kenya), three monks of St. Columba Abbey set out for Nigeria in 1974. Father Ambrose, Dom Columba Breen, and Fr. Columba Cary-Elwes were the tree monks dispatched to Nigeria to seek out the possibility of establishing a new monastic foundation after the failed initial efforts elsewhere.

== Monks Occupation ==
=== Hospitality ===
“Let all guests who arrive be received like Christ…” sets the tone for hospitality as stated in the Rule of Saint Benedict. The monks are expected to live by the rule of their founder Saint Benedict.

=== Herbal Enterprise ===
The monastery most visible enterprise is an herbal product manufacturing private company known as Pax Herbal Clinic and Research Laboratories.

=== Retreat Center ===
The monastery retreat center can accommodate up to 50 guests at any given time.
