= Ogbu Kalu =

Nigerian theologian

- Born: 1942; Isiugwu village, Ohafia, Abia State, Nigeria
- Died: January 7, 2009 (aged 66–67)
- Honours: Honorary Doctor of Divinity at Presbyterian College at McGill University (1997)

Ogbu Uke Kalu (1942 – 2009) was a Nigerian theologian. He was known as a major figure in the study of African Christianity, especially with relationship to African Pentecostalism.

== Biography ==
Born in Isiugwu village of Ohafia (now part of Abia State, Nigeria), Kalu first studied at Hope Waddell Training Institute in Calabar before moving to Canada, completing a BA at the University of Toronto (1967), MA in history at McMaster University (1968), and a PhD in history at the University of Toronto (1972). He later completed an MDiv at Princeton Theological Seminary (1974).

In 1974, Kalu took up a post in the Department of Religious Studies at the University of Nigeria, holding various teaching and administrative posts within the university's structures until 2001. He served as director of the Institute of African Studies, University of Nigeria in 1983 and again from 1995 to 1996. He took up the Henry Winters Luce Professor of World Christianity and Mission at McCormick Theological Seminary, a post he held until his unexpected death in 2009.

He is most known for his scholarship in African Christianity, especially his magnum opus African Pentecostalism: An Introduction (Oxford 2008).

== Honors ==
In 1997, Kalu was honored with an honorary Doctor of Divinity at Presbyterian College at McGill University. In 2019, the Ogbu Kalu Center for Christianity and African Culture was established at Abia State University.

In 2005, a festschrift was published in his honor, entitled Religion, History, and Politics in Nigeria: Essays in Honor of Ogbu U. Kalu.

== Works ==
- Kalu, Ogbu (2008). African Pentecostalism: An Introduction. New York: Oxford University Press. ISBN 978-0-19-534000-6.
- Kalu, Ogbu; Low, Alaine, eds. (2008). Interpreting Contemporary Christianity: Global Processes and Local Identities. Wm. B. Eerdmans Publishing. ISBN 978-0-8028-6242-6.
- Kalu, Ogbu, ed. (2007). African Christianity: An African Story. Africa World Press. ISBN 978-1-59221-580-5.
- Kalu, Ogbu (2003). The Embattled Gods: Christianization of Igboland, 1841-1991. Africa World Press. ISBN 978-1-59221-116-6.
