= 2023 Delta State gubernatorial election =

2023 gubernatorial election in Delta State, Nigeria

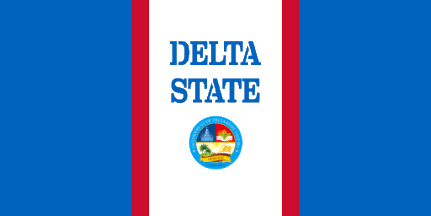
- 18 March 2023
- Registered: 3,221,697
Nominee	Sheriff Oborevwori	Ovie Omo-Agege	Ken Pela
Party	PDP	APC	LP
Running mate	Monday John Onyeme	Friday Osanebi	Julie Nwabogo Umukoro
Popular vote	53.63%	35.76%	7.15%
Percentage	360,234	240,229	48,027
- Omo-Agege: 40–50% 50–60% 60–70% Oborevwori: 40–50% 50–60% 60–70% 70–80%
Governor before election
Ifeanyi Okowa
PDP
Elected Governor
Sheriff Oborevwori
PDP

The 2023 Delta State gubernatorial election was held on 18 March 2023, to elect the Governor of Delta State, concurrent with elections to the Delta State House of Assembly as well as twenty-seven other gubernatorial elections and elections to all other state houses of assembly. The election — which was postponed from its original 11 March date — was held three weeks after the presidential election and National Assembly elections. Incumbent PDP Governor Ifeanyi Okowa was term-limited and could not seek re-election to a third term. Speaker of the House of Assembly Sheriff Oborevwori held the office for the PDP by a 18% margin over Senator Ovie Omo-Agege (APC).

Party primaries were scheduled for between 4 April and 9 June 2022 with the Peoples Democratic Party nominating Oborevwori on 25 May while the All Progressives Congress nominated Omo-Agege — the serving Senator for Delta Central — on 26 May. Although Oborevwori was initially disqualified by a Federal High Court on 7 July due to issues with his certificates, an Appeal Court overturned the ruling and reinstated Oborevwori on 29 August.

When collation completed on 20 March, INEC declared Oborevwori as the victor with official totals showing Oborevwori won about 360,000 votes (~54% of the vote) as runner-up Omo-Agege received around 240,000 votes (~36% of the vote) while LP nominee Ken Pela gained just over 48,000 votes (~7% of the vote). Omo-Agege rejected the results and filed legal challenges with the proceedings eventually reaching the Supreme Court, which affirmed Oborevwori's victory in January 2024.

== Electoral system ==
The Governor of Delta State is elected using a modified two-round system. To be elected in the first round, a candidate must receive the plurality of the vote and over 25% of the vote in at least two-thirds of state local government areas. If no candidate passes this threshold, a second round will be held between the top candidate and the next candidate to have received a plurality of votes in the highest number of local government areas.

== Background ==
Delta State is a diverse state in the South South; although its oil reserves make it one of the most wealthy states in the nation, Delta has faced challenges in frequent oil spills, environmental degradation, and cult violence in large part due to years of systemic corruption.

Politically, the state's 2019 elections were categorized as a continuation of the PDP's control as Okowa won with over 80% of the vote and the party won a majority in the House of Assembly along with holding two senate seats. For the federal House, the PDP won back one seat lost from a defection but the seat of a different defector from the PDP went to the APC leaving the total results at 9 PDP, 1 APC. Although the state was easily won by PDP presidential nominee Atiku Abubakar, it still swung towards Buhari compared to 2015 and had much lower turnout.

In Okowa's May 2019 inauguration speech, he said that his second term focuses would include establishing nineteen new technical colleges, transport infrastructure, healthcare, entrepreneurship training programmes, and agriculture development. Performance-wise, Okowa was praised for increasing government transparency and improving infrastructure but was criticized for the controversial Delta Line privatization and his administration’s systemic budget misappropriation.

== Primary elections ==
The primaries, along with any potential challenges to primary results, were to take place between 4 April and 3 June 2022 but the deadline was extended to 9 June. An informal zoning gentlemen's agreement sets the Delta Central Senatorial District to have the next governor as Delta Central has not held the governorship since 2007. However, groups from both the Delta North Senatorial District and Delta South Senatorial District claimed that as one full rotation of district would be complete in 2023, the next rotation could start from any district. Furthermore, Governor Ifeanyi Okowa claimed that there was no zoning agreement for the PDP while the Delta APC chastised the comments and committed to zoning their ticket to Delta Central. Nonetheless, both major parties ended up nominating natives of the Central district.

=== All Progressives Congress ===
The year prior to the APC primaries were categorized by party infighting between Senator Ovie Omo-Agege and several other Delta APC politicians led by minister Festus Keyamo and Great Ogboru who accused Omo-Agege of hijacking the party to guarantee his victory in the 2023 gubernatorial primary. The two groups held separate parallel party congresses in late 2021 but as Omo-Agege is a high-ranking senator, his faction's congress was recognized as legitimate by the national party and he announced his gubernatorial candidacy in April 2022.

On 20 April 2022, the APC National Executive Committee announced the party's schedule for gubernatorial primaries, setting its expression of interest form price at ₦10 million and nomination form price at ₦40 million with a 50% nomination form discount for candidates younger than 40 while women and candidates with disabilities get free nomination forms. Forms were to be sold from 26 April to 6 May until the deadline was later extended to 10 May then 12 May. After the submission of nomination forms by 13 May, candidates were screened by a party committee on 14 and 15 May while 16 May was the date for the screening appeal process. Ward congresses and LGA congresses were set for between 7 and 9 May to elect delegates for the primary. Candidates approved by the screening process advanced to a primary set for 26 May, in concurrence with other APC gubernatorial primaries; challenges to the result could be made the next day.

Ahead of the primary, Omo-Agege continuously reached out to aggrieved party members in an attempt to unify the party. On the primary date, Omo-Agege was the sole candidate and won the nomination unopposed. In his acceptance speech, Omo-Agege thanked his supporters and claimed that the state party reconciliation had succeeded. However, Ogboru left the party to become APGA's gubernatorial nominee, thus splitting the former state APC. About a month later, Omo-Agege picked Friday Osanebi as his running mate; Osanebi, a former House of Assembly member, was noted to be from the northern region and an ethnic Ndokwa, the group expected to get the deputy slot.

==== Nominated ====
- Ovie Omo-Agege: Senator for Delta Central (2015–present) and Senate Deputy President (2019–present)
  - Running mate—Friday Osanebi: former House of Assembly member for Ndokwa East

==== Withdrew ====
- Micheal Ighofose

==== Declined ====
- Jaro Egbo: lawyer

==== Results ====
APC primary results
Party	Candidate	Votes	%
APC	Ovie Omo-Agege	1,190	100.00%
Total votes		1,190	100.00%
Invalid or blank votes		45	N/A
Turnout		1,235	Unknown

=== People's Democratic Party ===
Analysts viewed the PDP primary as a proxy battle between outgoing Governor Ifeanyi Okowa (who allegedly supported Assembly Speaker Sheriff Oborevwori) and former Governor James Ibori (who backed former finance commissioner David Edevbie). Another element of the race is zoning with the vast majority of candidates coming from Delta Central but two exceptions from Delta South.

On 16 March 2022, the national PDP announced its gubernatorial primaries' schedule, setting its expression of interest form price at ₦1 million and the nomination form price at ₦20 million with a 50% discount for candidates between 25 and 30. Forms were to be sold until 1 April but the party later extended the deadline four times before reaching a final deadline of 22 April. After the submission of nomination forms by 25 April, candidates were screened by a party committee on 28 April while 2 May was the rescheduled date for the screening appeal process. Ward congresses were set for 29 April and LGA congresses were rescheduled for 10 May to elect delegates for the primary. Candidates approved by the screening process advanced to a primary set for 25 May, in concurrence with all other PDP gubernatorial primaries; challenges to the result could be made in the following days.

Pre-primary analysis noted the previous political closeness of Okowa, Ibori, Oborevwori, and Edevbie before claiming that scandals revolving around Oborevwori credentials could hurt him. On the primary date, over a dozen candidates contested an indirect primary at the Stephen Keshi Stadium that ended with Oborevwori's victory with results showing him winning over 70% of the delegates' votes. Shortly before vote collation ended, Edevbie and Deputy Governor Kingsley Otuaro staged a walkout in protest of the proceedings. After the primary, observers initially asked if the party could unite in the wake of the contentious primaries but when Okowa was selected as the PDP vice presidential nominee, observers noted that he had taken effective control of the entire state party from ibori for the first time since 1999. On 23 June, Monday John Onyeme — the state Board of Internal Revenue Chairman — was announced as Oborevwori's running mate; Onyeme was noted to be from the northern region and an ethnic Ndokwa, the group expected to get the PDP deputy slot. However, while Oborevwori was beginning his general election campaign, Edevbie went to court for the annulment of the primary based on discrepancies in Oborevwori's submitted certificates; Oborevwori was disqualified on 7 July by a Federal High Court. The court ruling restarted the internal power struggle between Okowa and Obori as some party members feared that the infighting could led to the disqualification of the party. While the Oborevwori appeal was pushed to August by an Appeal Court sitting in Abuja, a different High Court division found the primary election to have been validly conducted in a lawsuit filed by a different unsuccessful candidate — Ikie Agbarianovwe. On 29 August, the Appeal Court ruled in favour of Oborevwori, reinstating him as the PDP nominee on the grounds that his opponents had not conclusively proven forgeries in his certificates. Edevbie immediately initiated an appeal to the Supreme Court with Chief Justice Olukayode Ariwoola appointing a panel led by Justice Amina Augie to hear the case. On 21 October — the day of the verdict, a violent crowd of PDP supporters forced their way into the courtroom; after it was cleared, the panel's unanimous verdict in favour of Oborevwori was announced in which the court held that Oborevwori was the valid PDP nominee for governor. Both Okowa and Oborevwori publicly celebrated the verdict as a victory for internal democratic practices while the state PDP released a statement calling for unity.

==== Nominated ====
- Sheriff Oborevwori: House of Assembly member for Okpe (2015–present) and Speaker of the House of Assembly (2017–present)
  - Running mate—Monday John Onyeme: Chairman of the Delta State Board of Internal Revenue

==== Eliminated in primary ====
- Ikie Agbarianovwe
- Braduce Angozi: former Commissioner for Agriculture
- David Edevbie: former Commissioner for Finance, former Chief of Staff to Governor Ifeanyi Okowa, 2015 PDP gubernatorial candidate, and former Principal Secretary to President Umaru Musa Yar'Adua
- Abel Esievo: former Delta State Auditor General for Local Government
- Lucky Idike: economist
- Chris Iyovwaye: businessman
- Fred Majemite: former Commissioner and husband of former Ethiope West Local Government Chairwoman Faith Majemite
- James Manager: Senator for Delta South (2003–present), former Chairman of the Delta State PDP (1998–1999), former Commissioner for Sports, and former Commissioner for Works
- Peter Mrakpor: former state Attorney General and Commissioner for Justice and ex-husband of former House of Representatives member for Aniocha North/Aniocha South/Oshimili North/Oshimili South Joan Onyemaechi Mrakpor
- Ejaife Odebala: former aide to Governor Ifeanyi Okowa, former House of Assembly member for Sapele, and former Sapele Local Government Chairman
- Bright Edejeghwro Onajefe-Gift
- Kingsley Otuaro: Deputy Governor (2015–present)

==== Withdrew ====
- Emmanuel Aguariavwodo: former Senator for Delta Central (2013–2015) and former House of Representatives member
- James Augoye: former Commissioner for Works (2015–2019) and former Okpe Local Government Caretaker Chairman (2012–2014)
- Kenneth Gbagi: 2015 PDP gubernatorial candidate and former Minister of State for Education (defected prior to the primary to successfully run in the SDP gubernatorial primary)
- Ediri Idimi: engineer
- Efe Ofobruku: former aide to Governor Ifeanyi Okowa and former House of Assembly member for Uvwie

==== Results ====
Candidates' vote share
1. Sheriff Oborevwori (71.9%)
2. David Edevbie (13.8%)
3. James Manager (10.1%)
4. Other candidates (4.26%)

PDP primary results
Party	Candidate	Votes	%
PDP	Sheriff Oborevwori	590	71.86%
PDP	David Edevbie	113	13.77%
PDP	James Manager	83	10.11%
PDP	Peter Mrakpor	9	1.10%
PDP	Kingsley Otuaro	9	1.10%
PDP	Fred Majemite	6	0.73%
PDP	Ejaife Odebala	3	0.37%
PDP	Bright Onajefe-Gift	3	0.37%
PDP	Braduce Angozi	2	0.24%
PDP	Abel Esievo	2	0.24%
PDP	Lucky Idike	1	0.12%
PDP	Ikie Agbarianovwe	0	0.00%
PDP	Chris Iyowaye	0	0.00%
Total votes		821	100.00%
Invalid or blank votes		3	N/A
Turnout		824	Unknown

=== Minor parties ===
- Helen Agboola Onokiti (Accord)
  - Running mate: Iweanya David Okolie
- Jenkins Duvie Gwede (Action Alliance)
  - Running mate: Timis Tonbra Okonma
- Emmanuel Samuel Ogba (Action Democratic Party)
  - Running mate: Gift Valentina Okeh
- Annabel Cosmas (Action Peoples Party)
  - Running mate: Udoka Francis
- Efeoghene Shedrack Ekure (African Democratic Congress)
  - Running mate: Happiness Okoro
- Ekene Eze (Allied Peoples Movement)
  - Running mate: Oghenefegor Patrick Upama
- Great Ogboru (All Progressives Grand Alliance)
  - Running mate: Chinedu Sydney Allanah
- Sylvester Umudjane (Boot Party)
  - Running mate: Dorcas Ekpe
- Kennedy Kawhariebie Pela (Labour Party)
  - Running mate: Julie Nwabogo Efemena Umukoro
- Goodnews Agbi (New Nigeria Peoples Party)
  - Running mate: Bolaji Anthony Alabi
- Emmanuel America (National Rescue Movement)
  - Running mate: Blessing Tochi Njoagwuani
- Immanuel Edijala (People's Redemption Party)
  - Running mate: Glory Ndidi Umerah
- Kenneth Gbagi (Social Democratic Party)
  - Running mate: Ishoma Rosemary Oshilim
- Sunny Ofehe (Young Progressives Party)
  - Running mate: Eloho Chalele
- Emmanuel Okoh (Zenith Labour Party)
  - Running mate: Eziunor Onyefudsaonu

== Campaign ==
After the primaries in June 2022, observers stated that then-PDP nominee Sheriff Oborevwori focused on unifying the state PDP while the APC began general election preparations. Analysts also noted two notable minor party nominees — longtime politician Great Ogboru (APGA) and former Minister Kenneth Gbagi (SDP) — while also writing about the power shift as all prominent candidates were from the central district. By late June and July, both major parties' focus had shifted to the search for a deputy gubernatorial nominee as regional and ethnic balance was considered; as both Omo-Agege and Oborevwori are ethnic Urhobos from the central district, they looked towards the northern district for a running mate. As the Ndokwa people had never produced a governor or deputy governor, both Omo-Agege and Oborevwori picked a running mate from the ethnic group — Friday Osanebi and Monday John Onyeme, respectively.

Despite attempts at PDP reconciliation, a lawsuit challenging Oborevwori's candidacy by runner-up David Edevbie was not withdrawn and emerged successful on 7 July. The court ruling disqualified Oborevwori for discrepancies in his certificates and ordered the PDP to conduct a new primary. Oborevwori immediately appealed the decision and the PDP insisted that he was the party nominee but INEC omitted his name from the list of recognized nominees later in July. Although Oborevwori was reinstated as nominee by an Appeal Court ruling in late August, the month was dominated by PDP infighting and observer questions over the party's electoral strength. Coupled with the previous infighting was the shadow of Edevbie's appeal to the Supreme Court, which reporters said signified the continuation of the PDP crisis. When the official campaign period began in early October, analysis focused on various candidates while noting that the PDP had not resolved its crisis. The PDP dispute was finally concluded in mid-October as the Supreme Court ruled in favour of Oborevwori, affirming him as the valid PDP nominee.

At the end of October, negative campaigning escalated as Omo-Agege labeled Oborevwori as simply a proxy of Okowa while Oborevwori derided the APC as non-performing. By the next month, the jabs had intensified further with Omo-Agege accusing Oborevwori of running the House of Assembly as a rubber stamp for Okowa while Oborevwori responded by labeling the Senate as a rubber stamp for Buhari. The attacks were in the wider context of internal party rifts within both the APC and PDP as there were notably absences from campaign events by the intraparty rivals of Omo-Agege and Oborevwori. As campaigning continued into the new year, pundits noted the seeming disinterest in campaigning from the Edevbie-aligned camp within the PDP along with waves of defections from several parties in January 2023. Other observers noted the renewed political salience of ethnic identity politics. By February, analysts reviewed the chances of each candidate, noting that no minor party nominee seemed to have gained a foothold or have a chance of victory. Premium Times analysis labeled the race as a tossup between Oborevwori and Omo-Agege; noting the outcome of the presidential election and the moves of James Ibori as two key unknown factors before Election Day.

Later in February, focus switched to the presidential election on 25 February. In the election, Delta State voted for Peter Obi (LP); Obi won the state with 55.6% of the vote, beating Atiku Abubakar (PDP) at 26.3% and Bola Tinubu (APC) at 14.7%. Considered a slight surprise as Okowa was Abubakar's running mate, the result led to increased focus on the gubernatorial race. Additionally, the presidential result pushed journalists to label Ken Pela (LP) as a major candidate due to Obi's win.

== Projections ==
Source	Projection	As of
Africa Elects (Note: AfricaElects projections predict the likelihood of a candidate winning a state by categorizing a state as "Safe" for exceedingly likely, "Likely" for somewhat likely, and "Lean" for least likely. If no clear determination could be made, states are categorized as "tossups".)	Tossup	17 March 2023
Enough is Enough- SBM Intelligence (Note: EiE-SBM projections predict which candidates will win states.)	Oborevwori	2 March 2023

== Conduct ==
=== Electoral timetable ===
On 26 February 2022, the Independent National Electoral Commission released the timetable, setting out key dates and deadlines for the election. Months later on 27 May 2022, INEC made a slight revision to the timetable, allowing parties extra time to conduct primaries.

- 28 February 2022 – Publication of Notice of Election
- 4 April 2022 – First day for the conduct of party primaries
- 9 June 2022 (Note: The original deadline was 3 June; however, INEC pushed it back to 9 June at the behest of parties.) – Final day for the conduct of party primaries, including the resolution of disputes arising from them
- 1 July 2022 – First day for submission of nomination forms to INEC via the online portal
- 15 July 2022 – Final day for submission of nomination forms to INEC via the online portal
- 12 October 2022 – Commencement of the official campaign period
- 16 March 2023 (Note: The original deadline was 9 March; however, INEC pushed it back to 16 March.) – Final day of the official campaign period

== General election ==
=== Results ===
Candidates' vote share
1. Sheriff Oborevwori (PDP) (53.6%)
2. Ovie Omo-Agege (APC) (35.8%)
3. Ken Pela (LP) (7.15%)
4. Other candidates (3.46%)

2023 Delta State gubernatorial election
Party	Candidate	Votes	%
A	Helen Agboola Onokiti		
AA	Jenkins Duvie Gwede		
ADP	Emmanuel Samuel Ogba		
APP	Annabel Cosmas		
ADC	Efeoghene Shedrack Ekure		
APM	Ekene Eze		
APC	Ovie Omo-Agege		
APGA	Great Ogboru		
BP	Sylvester Umudjane		
LP	Kennedy Kawhariebie Pela		
New Nigeria Peoples Party	Goodnews Agbi		
NRM	Emmanuel America		
PDP	Sheriff Oborevwori		
PRP	Immanuel Edijala		
SDP	Kenneth Gbagi		
YPP	Sunny Ofehe		
ZLP	Emmanuel Okoh		
Total votes			100.00%
Invalid or blank votes			N/A
Turnout			

==== By senatorial district ====
The results of the election by senatorial district.

Senatorial District	Ovie Omo-Agege APC		Ken Pela LP		Sheriff Oborevwori PDP		Others		Total Valid Votes
Senatorial District	Votes	Percentage	Votes	Percentage	Votes	Percentage	Votes	Percentage	Total Valid Votes
Delta Central Senatorial District (Note: Comprising the local government areas of Ethiope East, Ethiope West, Sapele, Okpe, Udu, Ughelli North, Ughelli South, and Uvwie.)	115,860	47.98%	13,682	5.67%	100,089	41.45%	11,856	4.91%	241,487
Delta North Senatorial District (Note: Comprising the local government areas of Aniocha North, Aniocha South, Ika North East, Ika South, Ndokwa East, Ndokwa West, Oshimili South, Oshimili North, and Ukwuani.)	57,509	22.81%	27,783	11.02%	160,453	63.65%	6,322	2.51%	252,067
Delta South Senatorial District (Note: Comprising the local government areas of Bomadi, Burutu, Isoko North, Isoko South, Patani, Warri North, Warri South, and Warri South West.)	67,476	37.87%	5,782	3.24%	99,692	55.95%	5,235	2.94%	178,185
Totals	240,229	35.76%	48,027	7.15%	360,234	53.63%	23,247	3.46%	671,737

Percentage of the vote won by Omo-Agege and Oborevwori by district.
Omo-Agege <30% 30–40% 40–50%	Oborevwori; 40–50% 50–60% 60–70%

==== By federal constituency ====
The results of the election by federal constituency.

Federal Constituency	Ovie Omo-Agege APC		Ken Pela LP		Sheriff Oborevwori PDP		Others		Total Valid Votes
Federal Constituency	Votes	Percentage	Votes	Percentage	Votes	Percentage	Votes	Percentage	Total Valid Votes
Aniocha/Oshimili Federal Constituency (Note: Comprising the local government areas of Aniocha North, Aniocha South, Oshimili North, and Oshimili South.)	19,099	15.83%	19,321	16.01%	78,085	64.70%	4,177	3.46%	120,682
Bomadi/Patani Federal Constituency (Note: Comprising the local government areas of Bomadi and Patani.)	9,471	32.95%	185	0.64%	18,409	64.05%	677	2.36%	28,742
Burutu Federal Constituency (Note: Comprising the local government area of Burutu.)	11,736	47.02%	123	0.49%	12,641	50.64%	462	1.85%	24,962
Ethiope East/Ethiope West Federal Constituency (Note: Comprising the local government areas of Ethiope East and Ethiope West.)	18,358	43.51%	834	1.98%	20,095	47.63%	2,901	6.88%	42,188
Ika North East/Ika South Federal Constituency (Note: Comprising the local government areas of Ika North East and Ika South.)	11,523	18.90%	6,485	10.64%	42,043	68.97%	906	1.49%	60,957
Isoko South/Isoko North Federal Constituency (Note: Comprising the local government areas of Isoko North and Isoko South.)	26,765	40.28%	1,386	2.09%	35,862	53.98%	2,428	3.65%	66,441
Okpe/Sapele/Uvwie Federal Constituency (Note: Comprising the local government areas of Okpe, Sapele, and Uvwie.)	33,158	38.96%	8,953	10.52%	39,537	46.46%	3,457	4.06%	85,105
Ndokwa East/Ndokwa West/Ukwuani Federal Constituency (Note: Comprising the local government areas of Ndokwa East, Ndokwa West, and Ukwuani.)	26,887	38.18%	1,977	2.81%	40,325	57.26%	1,239	1.76%	70,428
Ughelli North/Ughelli South/Udu Federal Constituency (Note: Comprising the local government areas of Udu, Ughelli North, and Ughelli South.)	64,344	56.35%	3,895	3.41%	40,457	35.43%	5,498	4.81%	114,194
Warri North/Warri South/Warri South West Federal Constituency (Note: Comprising the local government areas of Warri North, Warri South, and Warri South West.)	19,504	33.60%	4,088	7.04%	32,780	56.48%	1,668	2.87%	58,040
Totals	240,229	35.76%	48,027	7.15%	360,234	53.63%	23,247	3.46%	671,737

Percentage of the vote won by Omo-Agege and Oborevwori by constituency.
Omo-Agege <30% 30–40% 40–50% 50–60%	Oborevwori; 30–40% 40–50% 50–60% 60–70%

==== By local government area ====
The results of the election by local government area.

LGA	Ovie Omo-Agege APC		Ken Pela LP		Sheriff Oborevwori PDP		Others		Total Valid Votes	Turnout Percentage
LGA	Votes	Percentage	Votes	Percentage	Votes	Percentage	Votes	Percentage	Total Valid Votes	Turnout Percentage
Aniocha North	4,386	26.88%	1,883	11.54%	8,938	54.78%	1,109	6.8%	16,316	18.93%
Aniocha South	4,623	22.59%	5,107	24.95%	10,032	49.01%	706	3.45%	20,468	21.06%
Bomadi	4,728	26.93%	100	0.57%	12,340	70.28%	391	2.23%	17,559	17.38%
Burutu	11,736	47.02%	123	0.49%	12,641	50.64%	462	1.85%	24,962	22.71%
Ethiope East	11,600	41.71%	530	1.91%	13,030	46.85%	2,654	9.54%	27,814	26.49%
Ethiope West	6,758	47.02%	304	2.11%	7,065	49.15%	247	1.72%	14,374	13.52%
Ika North East	4,733	14.00%	1,990	5.89%	26,760	79.15%	325	0.96%	33,808	26.38%
Ika South	6,790	25.01%	4,495	16.56%	15,283	56.29%	581	2.14%	27,149	27.63%
Isoko North	10,811	38.16%	894	3.16%	15,899	56.12%	728	2.57%	28,332	20.02%
Isoko South	15,954	41.87%	492	1.29%	19,963	52.38%	1,700	4.46%	38,109	27.62%
Ndokwa East	9,044	45.58%	251	1.26%	10,146	51.13%	402	2.03%	19,843	23.70%
Ndokwa West	10,252	37.99%	935	3.46%	15,539	57.58%	263	0.97%	26,989	26.62%
Okpe	8,679	34.68%	1,155	4.62%	14,544	58.11%	649	2.59%	25,027	21.97%
Oshimili North	5,327	11.74%	2,183	4.81%	35,966	79.28%	1,892	4.17%	45,368	44.22%
Oshimili South	4,763	12.36%	10,148	26.34%	23,149	60.08%	470	1.22%	38,530	20.07%
Patani	4,743	42.41%	85	0.76%	6,069	54.27%	286	2.56%	11,183	23.13%
Sapele	12,090	40.55%	1,458	4.89%	15,217	51.04%	1,050	3.52%	29,815	21.36%
Udu	13,769	52.67%	1,886	7.21%	9,746	37.28%	741	2.84%	26,142	18.72%
Ughelli North	34,955	65.67%	1,438	2.70%	15,198	28.55%	1,641	3.08%	53,232	24.71%
Ughelli South	15,620	44.86%	571	1.64%	15,513	44.55%	3,116	8.95%	34,820	26.50%
Ukwuani	7,591	32.17%	791	3.35%	14,640	62.05%	574	2.43%	23,596	26.89%
Uvwie	12,389	40.94%	6,340	20.95%	9,776	32.30%	1,758	5.81%	30,263	16.31%
Warri North	4,165	27.51%	205	1.35%	10,367	68.48%	402	2.66%	15,139	14.04%
Warri South	11,569	36.42%	3,743	11.78%	15,299	48.16%	1,157	3.64%	31,768	17.61%
Warri South West	3,770	33.86%	140	1.26%	7,114	63.90%	109	0.98%	11,133	15.86%
Totals	240,229	35.76%	48,027	7.15%	360,234	53.63%	23,247	3.46%	671,737	22.06%

Percentage of the vote won by Omo-Agege and Oborevwori by LGA.		Turnout Percentage by LGA
Omo-Agege <30% 30–40% 40–50% 50–60% 60–70%	Oborevwori <30% 30–40% 40–50% 50–60% 60–70% 70–80%	Turnout <30% 40–50%

== See also ==
- 2023 Nigerian elections
- 2023 Nigerian gubernatorial elections
