= 2023 Nigerian presidential election in Delta State =

- 25 February 2023
- Registered: 3,221,697
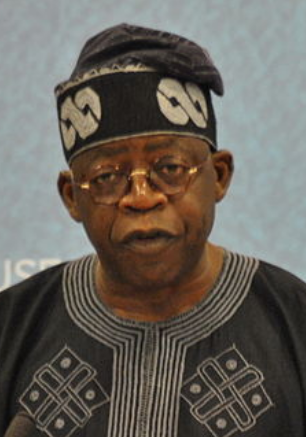

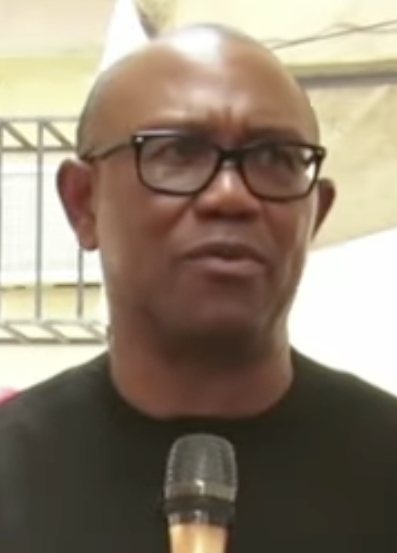

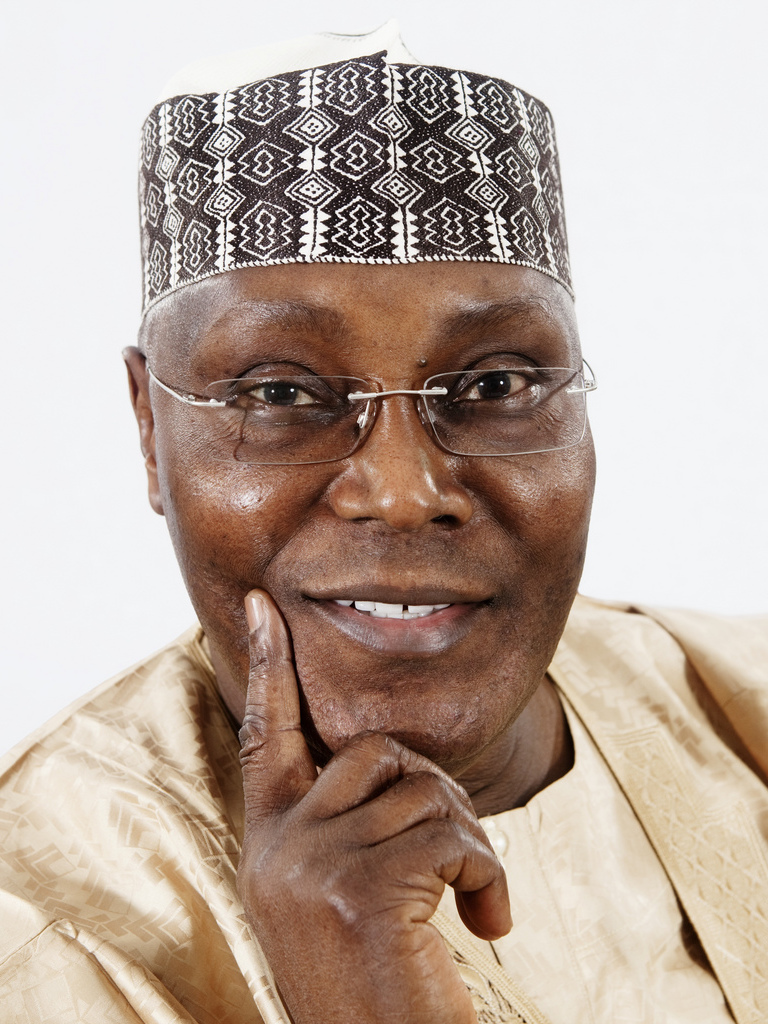
Nominee	Bola Tinubu	Peter Obi
Party	APC	LP
Home state	Lagos	Anambra
Running mate	Kashim Shettima	Yusuf Datti Baba-Ahmed
Nominee	Rabiu Kwankwaso	Atiku Abubakar
Party	New Nigeria Peoples Party	PDP
Home state	Kano	Adamawa
Running mate	Isaac Idahosa	Ifeanyi Okowa
President before election
Muhammadu Buhari
APC
Elected President
TBD

The 2023 Nigerian presidential election in Delta State will be held on 25 February 2023 as part of the nationwide 2023 Nigerian presidential election to elect the president and vice president of Nigeria. Other federal elections, including elections to the House of Representatives and the Senate, will also be held on the same date while state elections will be held two weeks afterward on 11 March.

== Background ==
Delta State is a diverse state in the South South; although its oil reserves make it one of the most wealthy states in the nation, Delta has faced challenges in frequent oil spills, environmental degradation, and cult violence in large part due to years of systemic corruption. Politically, the state's 2019 elections were categorized as a continuation of the PDP's control as Governor Ifeanyi Okowa won with over 80% of the vote and the party won a majority in the House of Assembly along with holding two senate seats. For the federal House, the PDP won back one seat lost from a defection but the seat of a different defector from the PDP went to the APC leaving the total results at 9 PDP, 1 APC. Although the state was easily won by PDP presidential nominee Atiku Abubakar, it still swung towards Buhari compared to 2015 and had much lower turnout.

== Polling ==
Polling organisation/client	Fieldwork date	Sample size					Others	Undecided	Undisclosed	Not voting
Polling organisation/client	Fieldwork date	Sample size	Tinubu APC	Obi LP	Kwankwaso NNPP	Abubakar PDP	Others	Undecided	Undisclosed	Not voting
BantuPage	December 2022	N/A	4%	68%	4%	10%	–	6%	3%	4%
BantuPage	January 2023	N/A	10%	40%	4%	15%	–	9%	7%	16%
Nextier (Delta crosstabs of national poll)	27 January 2023	N/A	2.3%	65.9%	–	30.7%	–	1.1%	–	–
SBM Intelligence for EiE (Delta crosstabs of national poll)	22 January-6 February 2023	N/A	5%	56%	–	9%	–	30%	–	–

== Projections ==
Source	Projection		As of
Africa Elects (Note: Africa Elects projections predict the likelihood of a candidate winning a state by categorizing a state as "Safe" for exceedingly likely, "Likely" for somewhat likely, and "Lean" for least likely. If no clear determination could be made, states are categorized as "tossups".)	Tossup		24 February 2023
Dataphyte (Note: Dataphyte projections predict candidates' projected votal shares in each state.)
Dataphyte	Tinubu:	15.99%	11 February 2023
Dataphyte	Obi:	57.94%	11 February 2023
Dataphyte	Abubakar:	20.84%	11 February 2023
Dataphyte	Others:	5.23%	11 February 2023
Enough is Enough- SBM Intelligence (Note: EiE-SBM projections predict which candidates will win states.)	Obi		17 February 2023
SBM Intelligence (Note: SBM projections predict which candidates will win states or, if no determination could be made, categorizes states as "Too close to call" (TCC).)	Abubakar		15 December 2022
ThisDay (Note: ThisDay projections predict candidates' projected votal shares in each state.)
ThisDay	Tinubu:	15%	27 December 2022
ThisDay	Obi:	30%	27 December 2022
ThisDay	Kwankwaso:	–	27 December 2022
ThisDay	Abubakar:	40%	27 December 2022
ThisDay	Others/Undecided:	10%	27 December 2022
The Nation (Note: SBM projections predict which candidates will win states or, if no determination could be made, categorizes states as "Battlegrounds.")	Abubakar		12-19 February 2023

== General election ==
=== Results ===
2023 Nigerian presidential election in Delta State
Party	Candidate	Votes	%
A	Christopher Imumolen		
AA	Hamza al-Mustapha		
ADP	Yabagi Sani		
APP	Osita Nnadi		
AAC	Omoyele Sowore		
ADC	Dumebi Kachikwu		
APC	Bola Tinubu		
APGA	Peter Umeadi		
APM	Princess Chichi Ojei		
BP	Sunday Adenuga		
LP	Peter Obi		
NRM	Felix Johnson Osakwe		
New Nigeria Peoples Party	Rabiu Kwankwaso		
PRP	Kola Abiola		
PDP	Atiku Abubakar		
SDP	Adewole Adebayo		
YPP	Malik Ado-Ibrahim		
ZLP	Dan Nwanyanwu		
Total votes			100.00%
Invalid or blank votes			N/A
Turnout			

==== By senatorial district ====
The results of the election by senatorial district.

Senatorial district	Bola Tinubu APC		Atiku Abubakar PDP		Peter Obi LP		Rabiu Kwankwaso NNPP		Others		Total valid votes
Senatorial district	Votes	%	Votes	%	Votes	%	Votes	%	Votes	%	Total valid votes
Delta Central Senatorial District (Note: Comprising the local government areas of Ethiope East, Ethiope West, Sapele, Okpe, Udu, Ughelli North, Ughelli South, and Uvwie.)	TBD	%	TBD	%	TBD	%	TBD	%	TBD	%	TBD
Delta North Senatorial District (Note: Comprising the local government areas of Aniocha North, Aniocha South, Ika North East, Ika South, Ndokwa East, Ndokwa West, Oshimili South, Oshimili North, and Ukwuani.)	TBD	%	TBD	%	TBD	%	TBD	%	TBD	%	TBD
Delta South Senatorial District (Note: Comprising the local government areas of Bomadi, Burutu, Isoko North, Isoko South, Patani, Warri North, Warri South, and Warri South West.)	TBD	%	TBD	%	TBD	%	TBD	%	TBD	%	TBD
Totals	TBD	%	TBD	%	TBD	%	TBD	%	TBD	%	TBD

==== By federal constituency ====
The results of the election by federal constituency.

Federal constituency	Bola Tinubu APC		Atiku Abubakar PDP		Peter Obi LP		Rabiu Kwankwaso NNPP		Others		Total valid votes
Federal constituency	Votes	%	Votes	%	Votes	%	Votes	%	Votes	%	Total valid votes
Aniocha/Oshimili Federal Constituency (Note: Comprising the local government areas of Aniocha North, Aniocha South, Oshimili North, and Oshimili South.)	TBD	%	TBD	%	TBD	%	TBD	%	TBD	%	TBD
Bomadi/Patani Federal Constituency (Note: Comprising the local government areas of Bomadi and Patani.)	TBD	%	TBD	%	TBD	%	TBD	%	TBD	%	TBD
Burutu Federal Constituency (Note: Comprising the local government area of Burutu.)	TBD	%	TBD	%	TBD	%	TBD	%	TBD	%	TBD
Ethiope East/Ethiope West Federal Constituency (Note: Comprising the local government areas of Ethiope East and Ethiope West.)	TBD	%	TBD	%	TBD	%	TBD	%	TBD	%	TBD
Ika North East/Ika South Federal Constituency (Note: Comprising the local government areas of Ika North East and Ika South.)	TBD	%	TBD	%	TBD	%	TBD	%	TBD	%	TBD
Isoko South/Isoko North Federal Constituency (Note: Comprising the local government areas of Isoko North and Isoko South.)	TBD	%	TBD	%	TBD	%	TBD	%	TBD	%	TBD
Okpe/Sapele/Uvwie Federal Constituency (Note: Comprising the local government areas of Okpe, Sapele, and Uvwie.)	TBD	%	TBD	%	TBD	%	TBD	%	TBD	%	TBD
Ndokwa East/Ndokwa West/Ukwuani Federal Constituency (Note: Comprising the local government areas of Ndokwa East, Ndokwa West, and Ukwuani.)	TBD	%	TBD	%	TBD	%	TBD	%	TBD	%	TBD
Ughelli North/Ughelli South/Udu Federal Constituency (Note: Comprising the local government areas of Udu, Ughelli North, and Ughelli South.)	TBD	%	TBD	%	TBD	%	TBD	%	TBD	%	TBD
Warri North/Warri South/Warri South West Federal Constituency (Note: Comprising the local government areas of Warri North, Warri South, and Warri South West.)	TBD	%	TBD	%	TBD	%	TBD	%	TBD	%	TBD
Totals	TBD	%	TBD	%	TBD	%	TBD	%	TBD	%	TBD

==== By local government area ====
The results of the election by local government area.

Local government area	Bola Tinubu APC		Atiku Abubakar PDP		Peter Obi LP		Rabiu Kwankwaso NNPP		Others		Total valid votes	Turnout (%)
Local government area	Votes	%	Votes	%	Votes	%	Votes	%	Votes	%	Total valid votes	Turnout (%)
Aniocha North	TBD	%	TBD	%	TBD	%	TBD	%	TBD	%	TBD	%
Aniocha South	TBD	%	TBD	%	TBD	%	TBD	%	TBD	%	TBD	%
Bomadi	TBD	%	TBD	%	TBD	%	TBD	%	TBD	%	TBD	%
Burutu	TBD	%	TBD	%	TBD	%	TBD	%	TBD	%	TBD	%
Ethiope East	TBD	%	TBD	%	TBD	%	TBD	%	TBD	%	TBD	%
Ethiope West	TBD	%	TBD	%	TBD	%	TBD	%	TBD	%	TBD	%
Ika North East	TBD	%	TBD	%	TBD	%	TBD	%	TBD	%	TBD	%
Ika South	TBD	%	TBD	%	TBD	%	TBD	%	TBD	%	TBD	%
Isoko North	TBD	%	TBD	%	TBD	%	TBD	%	TBD	%	TBD	%
Isoko South	TBD	%	TBD	%	TBD	%	TBD	%	TBD	%	TBD	%
Ndokwa East	TBD	%	TBD	%	TBD	%	TBD	%	TBD	%	TBD	%
Ndokwa West	TBD	%	TBD	%	TBD	%	TBD	%	TBD	%	TBD	%
Oshimili North	TBD	%	TBD	%	TBD	%	TBD	%	TBD	%	TBD	%
Oshimili South	TBD	%	TBD	%	TBD	%	TBD	%	TBD	%	TBD	%
Patani	TBD	%	TBD	%	TBD	%	TBD	%	TBD	%	TBD	%
Sapele	TBD	%	TBD	%	TBD	%	TBD	%	TBD	%	TBD	%
Udu	TBD	%	TBD	%	TBD	%	TBD	%	TBD	%	TBD	%
Ughelli North	TBD	%	TBD	%	TBD	%	TBD	%	TBD	%	TBD	%
Ughelli South	TBD	%	TBD	%	TBD	%	TBD	%	TBD	%	TBD	%
Ukwuani	TBD	%	TBD	%	TBD	%	TBD	%	TBD	%	TBD	%
Uvwie	TBD	%	TBD	%	TBD	%	TBD	%	TBD	%	TBD	%
Warri North	TBD	%	TBD	%	TBD	%	TBD	%	TBD	%	TBD	%
Warri South	TBD	%	TBD	%	TBD	%	TBD	%	TBD	%	TBD	%
Warri South West	TBD	%	TBD	%	TBD	%	TBD	%	TBD	%	TBD	%
Totals	TBD	%	TBD	%	TBD	%	TBD	%	TBD	%	TBD	%

== See also ==
- 2023 Delta State elections
- 2023 Nigerian presidential election
