= 2019 Delta State gubernatorial election =

2019 gubernatorial election in Delta State, Nigeria

- (Nigeria)
- March 9, 2019
- Turnout: 41.62%
Nominee	Ifeanyi Okowa	Great Ogboru
Party	PDP	APC
Running mate	Kingsley Otuaro
Popular vote	925,274	215,938
Percentage	80.17%	18.71%
Governor before election
Ifeanyi Okowa
PDP
Elected Governor
Ifeanyi Okowa
PDP

The 2019 Delta State gubernatorial election occurred on March 9, 2019. Incumbent PDP Governor Ifeanyi Arthur Okowa won re-election for a second term, defeating APC's Great Ovedje Ogboru, and several minor party candidates.

Okowa won in 23 LGAs with a total of 80.17% of popular vote, while Ogboru won in the other two of the state's 25 LGAs with a total of 18.71% of popular vote having 709,336 votes less than Okowa.

Ifeanyi Okowa emerged unopposed in the PDP gubernatorial primary as the sole candidate, retaining his deputy, Kingsley Otuaro.

Of the 50 candidates who aspired for the governorship seat, 42 were male, eight were female.

== Electoral system ==
The Governor of Delta State is elected using the plurality voting system.

== Primary election ==
=== PDP primary ===
The PDP primary election was held on 30 September 2018. Senator (Dr.) Ifeanyi Okowa, the incumbent governor, who was the party sole aspirant, emerged winner with 3,252 delegate votes. The chairperson of the PDP gubernatorial primary elections in Delta State announced there were 3,278 accredited delegates from across the state's local government areas, who cast 26 invalid votes.

=== Candidates ===
- Party nominee: Ifeanyi Okowa: Incumbent governor.
- Running mate: Kingsley Otuaro.

=== APC primary ===
The emergence of Chief Great Ogboru and Prof. Pat Utomi as the All Progressives Congress (APC) 2019 Delta State governorship candidates got messy, as the APC primary elections could not be held in a single venue but ran concurrently in two locations in Asaba. This crisis began early in the month of the elections. The elections returning officer at one venue announced Pat Utomi as the winner with 2,481 votes out of the 3,755 total delegate votes, followed by Rt. Hon. Victor Ochei, Dr. Cairo Ojougbuoh and Chief Great Ogboru, respectively. Great Ovedje Ogboru was, however, declared winner by the returning officer at the second venue, and said to have polled 3,292 votes of 3,515 valid votes; 129 votes were declared invalid. Ochei polled 160 votes, Utomi 26 votes and Ojougbuoh 12 votes. The elections were held on 30 September 2018.

After the elections were concluded, BusinessDay reported one of the candidates, Hon. Victor Ochei, taking the said winner to the Federal High Court in Abuja, asking the court to nullify the results, which were nullified in April 2019.

=== Candidates ===
- Party nominee: Great Ogboru.
- Running mate: .
- Pat Utomi: 1st Runner-up
- Victor Ochei: 2nd Runner-up
- Cairo Ojougbuoh: 3rd Runner-up

== Results ==
A total of 50 candidates registered with the Independent National Electoral Commission to contest in the election. PDP Governor Ifeanyi Okowa won re-election for a second term, defeating APC's Great Ovedje Ogboru, and several minor party candidates. Okowa polled 925,274 votes representing 80.17% of total vote cast, and Ogboru 215,938 votes representing 18.71%.

The total number of registered voters in the state was 2,831,205 while 1,188,784 voters were accredited. Total number of votes cast was 1,178,335, while total number of valid votes was 1,154,188. Total rejected votes were 24,147.

Candidate	Party	Votes	%
Ifeanyi Arthur Okowa	People's Democratic Party (PDP)	925,274	80.17
Great Ovedje Ogboru	All Progressives Congress (APC)	215,938	18.71
Chukwu Prince Joe	African Democratic Congress (ADC)	2,032	0.18
Richard Kimeku	Democratic People's Party (DPP)	1,185	0.10
Akwara John Ogheneovo	Social Democratic Party (SDP)	1,136	0.10
Ashikodi David	Accord (A)	1,027	0.09
Mohammed Oluremi Jane Batsone	People for Democratic Change (PDC)	1,001	0.09
Frank Ufuoma Esanobi	African Action Congress (AAC)	914	0.08
Obire Odiakpo Justine	Progressive Peoples Alliance (PPA)	549	0.05
Odibo Golly Hannah Atata	Advanced Congress of Democrats (ACD)	429	0.04
Edward Okiya	Labour Party (LP)	411	0.04
Onikiti Helen	Advanced Peoples Democratic Alliance (APDA)	331	0.03
Ajaguogbadim Joshua Patrick Chidinma	United Progressive Party (UPP)	321	0.03
Augustine Chukwuemeka Obi	Re-build Nigeria Party (RBNP)	294	0.03
Gabriel Mamuzo	Nigeria People's Congress (NPC)	284	0.02
Brando Omu	All Grand Alliance Party (AGAP)	275	0.02
Monu-Olarewaju Theodora Chime	Advanced Allied Party (AAP)	258	0.02
Michael Egoh	Action Democratic Party (ADP)	228	0.02
Ejumedia Prince Sunny	Hope Democratic Party (HDP)	224	0.02
Illoh Awele Onyisi	Mega Party of Nigeria (MPN)	183	0.02
Enwose Williams B. N.	Freedom and Justice Party (FJP)	180	0.02
Isamade Paul	Allied Congress Party of Nigeria (ACPN)	162	0.01
Victor Egwuenu	People's Party of Nigeria (PPN)	134	0.01
Godwin Mojume Asikawali	Justice Must Prevail Party (JMPP)	115	0.01
America Emmanuel Ogheneochuko	National Rescue Movement (NRM)	110	0.01
Gordson Korogha Enhubareh	National Conscience Party (NCP)	100	0.01
Bidokwu Emeka	Action Alliance (AA)	98	0.01
Cosmos Annabel	Association for Better Nigeria (ABN)	92	0.01
Umudjane Sylvester Omonigho	Better Nigeria Progressive Party (BNPP)	95	0.01
Lucky Dikadi	People's Redemption Party (PRP)	83	0.01
Amaye John Oghenemohwo	Allied Peoples Movement (APM)	70	0.01
Ossai Edward Olie	Grassroots Development Party of Nigeria (GDPN)	61	0.01
Ejiro Odu Tolbert	National Interest Party (NIP)	59	0.01
Friday Udumebraye Togbe	Sustainable National Party (SNP)	51	0.00
Jean Chiazor Anishere	People's Trust (PT)	49	0.00
Olotu Stanley Omohwo	Reformed Advanced Party (RAP)	46	0.00
Efetoboh Patricia	National Action Council (NAC)	41	0.00
Iselegwu Clement	Restoration Party of Nigeria (RP)	39	0.00
Nkwoala Emeka Mathias	Zenith Labour Party (ZLP)	38	0.00
Obiodogwu Augustine	Democratic Alternative (DA)	33	0.00
Okolugbo Gloria	Change Advocacy Party (CAP)	30	0.00
Anthony Mejebi Clarke	Green Party of Nigeria (GPN)	29	0.00
Edozien Leroy Chuma	Alliance of Social Democrats (ASD)	25	0.00
Anyiraodiakaose Nelly	Nigeria Community Movement Party (NCMP)	25	0.00
Enuakpoje Peters Erho	Independent Democrats (ID)	31	0.00
Oghotevwo Lucky Oyovwi	Movement for the Restoration and Defence of Democracy (MRDD)	25	0.00
Atagbuzia Chibueze Sixtus	Kowa Party (KP)	22	0.00
Endurance Udubrai Eddy	National Democratic Liberty Party (NDLP)	21	0.00
Okotcha Odinma Eric	Mass Action Joint Alliance (MAJA)	15	0.00
Obichie David Egwebuike	Nigeria for Democracy (NFD)	15	0.00
Total		1,154,188	100.00
Valid votes		1,154,188	97.95
Invalid/blank votes		24,147	2.05
Total votes		1,178,335	100.00
Registered voters/turnout		2,831,205	41.62
Source: INEC

=== By local government area ===
Here are the results of the election from the local government areas of the state for the two major parties. The total valid votes of 1,154,188 represents the 50 political parties that participated in the election. Green represents LGAs won by Okowa. Blue represents LGAs won by Ogboru.

County (LGA)	Ifeanyi Okowa PDP		Great Ogboru APC		Total votes
County (LGA)	#	%	#	%	#
Aniocha North	17,054		4,653		
Aniocha South	20,947		3,138		
Bomadi	63,851		4,437		
Burutu	49,722		4,437		
Ethiope East	11,489		21,141		
Ethiope West	62,044		6,211		
Ika North-East	67,417		2,303		
Ika South	33,371		3,877		
Isoko North	29,648		9,817		
Isoko South	43,730		14,259		
Ndokwa East	30,670		4,306		
Ndokwa West	30,971		5,722		
Okpe	20,415		9,424		
Oshimili North	37,744		2,906		
Oshimili South	54,766		2,700		
Patani	19,683		3,288		
Sapele	18,572		10,457		
Udu	9,042		8,605		
Ughelli North	19,045		22,081		
Ughelli South	32,086		20,233		
Ukwuani	18,328		7,264		
Uvwie	15,454		10,467		
Warri North	44,713		11,116		
Warri South	34,977		12,982		
Warri South West	139,534		10,906		
Totals					-
