= Julius Robinson =

Nigerian police officer

- Born: October 20, 1974 (age 52); Kaduna State, Nigeria
- Occupation: Police officer
- Years active: 1999–present
- Employer: Nigeria Police Force
- Known for: Intelligence-led policing; Commander of CP-SAT (Delta State)
- Awards: Security Watch Africa Triple Award; Africa’s Most Outstanding Policeman (2025)

Julius Robinson (born 20 October 1974) is a Nigerian police officer who serves as an Assistant Superintendent of Police (ASP) in the Nigeria Police Force. He is the commander of the CP-Special Assignment Team (CP-SAT) under the Delta State Police Command and is known for his role in intelligence-led operations against kidnapping syndicates and armed robberies.

== Early life and education ==
Julius Robinson was born in Kaduna State, Nigeria. He was raised in Imburu in Numan Local Government Area, Adamawa State, having lost both his parents at a young age. Robinson attended LEA Primary School in Kaduna, and completed secondary education in Jos and Yola, Adamawa State. He later obtained a Diploma in Common Law from the University of Maiduguri and a postgraduate degree in Cybersecurity from Novena University, Ogume.

== Police career ==
Robinson joined the Nigeria Police Force on 4 January 1999 after completing training at the Police College, Maiduguri. Over the years, he has served in a variety of units, including the Criminal Intelligence Bureau in Minna, the State Intelligence Bureau, the Special Anti-Kidnapping Squad, cybercrime units, and the Inspector-General of Police Intelligence Response Team.

He commands the CP-Special Assignment Team (CP-SAT) in the Delta State Police Command. In this role, his team has carried out a number of high-profile operations:

- In March 2025, operatives under his leadership trailed suspected kidnappers into Rivers State and arrested a suspect, recovering an AK-47 rifle and live ammunition.
- In March 2025, five suspected kidnappers were neutralised in a gun duel after being traced to a forest in Ughelli North LGA, Delta State. Weapons recovered included an AK-47, a pump-action gun, and locally made firearms.
- In May 2025, during a covert patrol along Ughelli–Patani Road, CP-SAT led by Robinson engaged suspects in a shuttle bus, resulting in a gun duel. Three suspects were fatally wounded, and one AK-47 rifle with 18 rounds of live ammunition was recovered.
- In July 2025, his team, in collaboration with other squads, arrested a notorious kidnap suspect, Chiadiji “Smooth” Collins, and recovered an AK-47 rifle and 40 rounds of 7.62 mm ammunition.
- In February 2025, his team arrested suspected armed robbers and kidnappers in Ughelli North Local Government Area, recovering firearms, ammunition, military uniforms, and other paraphernalia.

== Awards and recognition ==
In November 2025, Robinson was named the only African police officer included in the Who’s Who Africa Bibliographical Compendium (2025), published by Time Africa Magazine. He was honoured as “Africa’s Most Outstanding Policeman of the Year” at the award event. He has also received other awards, including the Security Watch Africa Triple Award and Crime Buster of the Year (2023) from the Crime Reporters Association of Nigeria.

== Professional development ==
Robinson has undertaken international training to completed a basic intelligence and VIP protection course in Israel and later trained in intelligence analysis in California, United States.

== See also ==
- Nigeria Police Force
