= Novena University =

Nigerian university

Novena University Ogume
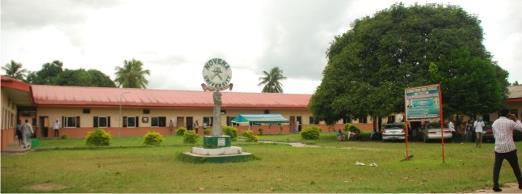
- Motto: Knowledge through diligence
- Established: 2005
- Chancellor: Alfred Papapereye Diete-Spiff
- Vice-Chancellor: Nduka, Godwin Chukwuenweniwe
- Location: Ogume, Delta State, Nigeria
- Website: www.novenauniversity.edu.ng/index.php

Novena University is the first private university in Delta State located in Ogume, Delta State, Nigeria. Novena University was established to meet the needs of Nigerian students who are not accepted by existing tertiary institutions, which cannot accommodate a good percentage of those seeking admission each year.

Novena University was founded in 2005. It boasts of several academic and non-academic facilities and services to the students. These include the library and the administrative services.

== Accredited courses ==
Novena University is one of the private universities in Nigeria that has been fully and officially accredited by the National Universities Commission (NUC). It offers different undergraduate programmes that are open to interested candidates.

In 2024, the National Universities Commission (NUC) gave full accreditation status on Nursing Degree program to Novena university. This was signed by the Director of Accreditation, Engr. Abraham Chundusu for the Executive Secretary of the Commission on the letter dated 6th of June, 2024.

In 2022, the University started LL.B Degree programme which covered Civil Law, Common Law, Customary Law, Religious Law and Mixed Legal Systems. The VC explained that "the Law courses curriculum covers new and modern frontiers of legal training that are crucial to national development. Such laws include, but are not limited to Environmental Law, Oil, Gas and Energy, International Trade Laws, Information Technology and Communication/Cyber Security and Gender Laws amongst others."

In 2021, Novena University got NUC approval to start programmes in Medicine, Dentistry and Pharmacy. These included other Health Sciences programmes like Nursing, Doctor of Optometry, Medical Laboratory Science, Anatomy, Physiology, Pharmacology, Public and Community Health which is offered up to PhD specialising in Public Health, Biostatistics, Epidemiology, Health Information Systems, Primary Healthcare and Environmental Health. In another development, A project of €100 million from a German Development Bank approved a project of €100 million to build 240-bed high standard facilities for the University's Teaching Hospital. The University also offers program in Public and Community Health up to Ph.D level.

Novena University also has the NUC approval and accreditation for the following courses at the postgraduate level: PGD, MSc, MBA, and PhD degrees.

== Academic activities ==
Novena University performs various academic activities.

=== Matriculation ===
On the 16th matriculation ceremony of Novena University, which was also the 2020/2021 academic session, 952 students matriculated. During the ceremony, the Vice Chancellor, addressed the students and stated, "deviant behaviours such as cultism, examination malpractice, alcoholism, abuses, indecent dressing, stealing, fighting, damage to property, are not allowed and we advocate University community policing which makes it possible for all of us to be involved in ensuring our safety."

=== Convocation ===
Novena University had a combined convocation ceremony for the 2018/2019 and 2023/2024 academic sessions, which was its 5th convention. The ceremony took place at the Amai campus located at Ukwuani Local Government Area. It was at this ceremony that the Delta State Governor, Rt. Hon. Sheriff Oborevwori, was conferred with an honorary Doctor of Science (Honoris Causa) in Public Policy and Strategy. Among the graduates was the Delta State Deputy Governor, Monday Onyeme, who graduated with an award of a Master of Science degree in Accounting.

The Delta State Governor who received the Honorary PhD award donated a 200-capacity hall to the university. This was to improve the infrastructure in the University.

List of courses Novena University offers:

- Accounting
- Biochemistry
- Business administration
- Chemistry
- Computer science
- Computer science and Mathematics
- Economics
- Energy and petroleum studies
- Environmental management technology
- Finance
- Intelligence and security studies
- International relations and strategic studies
- Law
- Mass communication
- Microbiology
- Physics
- Physics with electronics
- Political science
- Public administration
- Public and community health
- Sociology
