= Delta North senatorial district =

Senatorial district in Nigeria

Delta North senatorial district in Delta State, Nigeria, covers 9 local governments namely Aniocha North, Aniocha South, Ika North East, Ika South, Ndokwa East, Ndokwa West, Oshimili South, Oshimili North and Ukwuani. The current representative of Delta North is Ned Nwoko of the All Progressives Congress, APC.

== List of senators representing Delta North ==
Senator	Party	Year	Assembly
Patrick Osakwe	Accord	1999 - 2011	4th 5th 6th
Ifeanyi Okowa	PDP	2011-2015	7th
Peter Nwaoboshi	PDP	2015–2023	8th 9th
Ned Nwoko	APC	2023–present	10th
