= David Edevbie =

Nigerian politician

- Occupation: Politician
- Known for: Peoples Democratic Party, PDP candidate for 2023 gubernatorial elections in Delta State, Nigeria
- Political party: People's Democratic Party (PDP)

David Edevbie is a Nigerian politician and a former candidate of the People's Democratic Party, (PDP) for 2023 Nigerian gubernatorial elections in Delta state He lost to Sheriff Oborevwori.

Edevbie was the Commissioner for Finance and Economic Planning under the James Ibori-led Administration between June 1999 to September 2005. He also was the Commissioner of Finance under Governor Ifeanyi Okowa from 2015 to 2019. Edevbie was the Finance Director of the Umaru Musa Yar’Adua Campaign Organization in 2006–2007 and later as Principal Secretary to President Umaru Musa Yar'Adua from 2008 to 2010. His most recent role in the public life was as Chief of Staff to Governor Ifeanyi Okowa, which he left to pursue his aspiration to become the next governor of Delta State.

== Education ==
Edevbie studied economics at the University of Lagos and graduated with a B.Sc. (Hons.) in 1985. He studied for a Master of Business Administration (MBA) in International Corporate Finance from Cardiff Business School of The University of Wales – Cardiff, UK between 1987 and 1988. Edevbie did the Advanced Management Program at Harvard Business School, 2003.

== Career ==
=== Project finance and administration ===
Edevbie worked with Barclays Bank Plc, UK as a trainee through the bank's Management Development Programme. Between 1988 and 1992, he rose to the position of Manager's Assistant, Corporate Lending.

In 1992, he worked with Hill Samuel, a U.K. merchant bank, as an Investment Banking Executive. In 1995, he worked with the Commonwealth Development Corporation (CDC), UK (CDC Group), as an Investment Officer responsible for Asia & Pacific Regions. In 1996, he was promoted to Deputy Country Head, and was responsible for establishing the CDC Philippines Office. In March 1998, he returned to the London Office and was promoted to Investment Manager.

Edevbie worked as a Principal Consultant for Avantgarde Project Finance Advisory & Monitoring Consultancy, Lagos, from 2010 to 2015.

=== Delta State politics ===
In June 1999, Edevbie was appointed Commissioner for Finance and Economic Planning, Delta State. In 2006, he was invited by one of the then PDP Presidential Aspirants, Umaru Musa Yar'Adua to join his small campaign team as Director of Finance and Strategy.

In 2008, President Yar’Adua appointed him as Principal Secretary to the President (PSP) to take over the responsibilities of the out-going Chief of Staff. He remained in the Presidency until shortly after President Yar’Adua's death in April 2010.

In 2015, Edevbie was appointed Commissioner of Finance, Delta State until May 2019. He was the Chief of Staff to Governor Ifeanyi Okowa from June 2019 to May 2021.

In 2021, Edevbie began pursuing his aspiration to become the next governor of Delta State under the platform of the People's Democratic Party for the oncoming 2023 gubernatorial elections in Delta State, Nigeria.

== See also ==
- 2023 Delta State gubernatorial election
- 2023 Nigerian gubernatorial elections
- 2015 Delta State gubernatorial election
