= Oghale =

- Gender: Unisex
- Language(s): Isoko

Origin
- Word/name: Delta State
- Meaning: Blessing

listen

Oghale means Blessing in the Isoko language, Delta State, Nigeria.

People with this name include:

- Samuel Óghalé Oboh, Canadian architect
- Sunny Oghale Ofehe, Nigerian-Dutch activist and politician
