= Obiaruku =

- Town
- Location in Nigeria
- Coordinates: 5°51′N 6°09′E
- Country: Nigeria
- State: Delta State
- LGA(s): Ukwuani
- Federal Constituency: Ndokwa-Ukwuani
- Senatorial District: Delta North

Government
  - Community leader: Ọkpala-Uku

Population (2021)
  - Total: 26,277
- Area code: 322112

Obiaruku is an Ukwuani town in Delta State, Nigeria. It was founded by the people of Ezhiọkpọ and Ụmụebu origin of Delta State. Obiaruku is the headquarters of Ukwuani Local Government Area of Delta State. It is one of the major homeland of the Ukwuani speaking (akashiada) people. The Ọkpala-Uku of Obiaruku is the oldest male in the town. Obiaruku is made of several communities and sub communities called quarters which includes Ọkụzụ, Ụmụsume, Ogbeaka, Ogwezhi etc. Each community or quarter has an Ọkpala-Uku who is the oldest male as the traditional head of the community. The Ọkpala-Uku has his cabinet made up of Chiefs (Ine-otu) including the One-otu-Uku (traditional prime minister), Ugo (Speaker), Ọnụeze etc. There is a general assembly of traditional rulers with the oldest Ọkpala-Uku as the Ọkpala-Uku General.
