= Kwale, Nigeria =

Kwale Utagba Ogbe
- Town
- Nickname: K town
- Location in Nigeria
- Coordinates: 5°42′39.24″N 6°26′28.68″E
- Country: Nigeria
- State: Delta State
- LGA: Ndokwa West

Population
  - Total: 20,267
- Climate: Aw

Kwale is an Ukwuani town in Delta State, Nigeria, located in the northern part of the state. The native language of the people is Ukwuani, an Igboid language. It is the headquarters of Ndokwa West local government area.

Kwale is host to oil and gas companies, some of which have presence in different parts of the African city such as a gas flow facility which is situated at Ebedei nearby Umukwata area and another at Ebendo and Umusadege with a pipeline running from Aboh and river Ase creeks.

There are considerations about the establishment of modular refineries within the area.
