= Edevbie =

Edevbie is a surname. Notable people with the surname include:

- Aghogho Edevbie, American lawyer and election official
- David Edevbie, Nigerian politician
