= Tobore Oborevwori =

Nigerian philanthropist

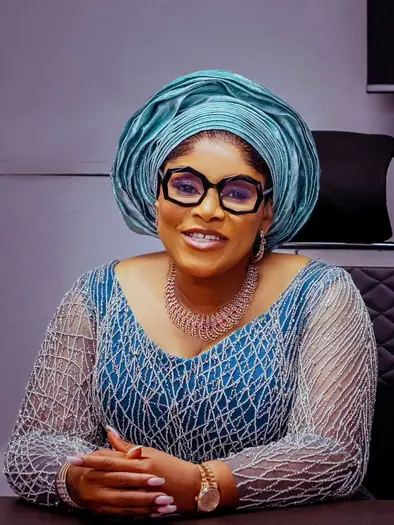
- First Lady of Delta State, Mrs. Tobore Oborevwori

First Lady of Delta State
- Incumbent
- Assumed office 29 May 2023
- Governor: Sheriff Oborevwori
- Preceded by: Dame Edith Okowa

Personal details
- Born: Tobore Oborevwori; February 5, 1970 (age 56) Lagos, Nigeria
- Spouse: Sheriff Oborevwori
- Occupation: Policy Advocate

Tobore Oborevwori (born February 5, 1970) is a Nigerian philanthropist and policy advocate.She has been the First Lady of Delta State since May 2023 as the wife of its current governor, Sheriff Oborevwori.

== Early life and education ==
Tobore Oborevwori was born in Lagos Local Government Area of Lagos, Nigeria to Christopher Ogi and Agnes Alere, Christian family.

She attended Otovwodo Primary School in Ughelli, and enrolled as a vocational student at St. Ita's Girls Grammar School in Sapele, Delta State.

She graduated from Delta State University, Abraka, where she obtained a bachelor's degree in sociology in 2010.

Tobore Oborevwori is married to Sheriff Oborevwori who she first met decades ago. They have five children.

== Philanthropy ==
Oborevwori launched You Matter Charity Foundation, a non-governmental organization which aims at solving needs of individuals with autism and other vulnerable members of the community.
