= 2003 Nigerian Senate elections in Delta State =

2003 Nigerian Senate election in Delta State

The 2003 Nigerian Senate election in Delta State was held on April 12, 2003, to elect members of the Nigerian Senate to represent Delta State. Patrick Osakwe representing Delta North, Felix Ibru representing Delta Central and James Manager representing Delta South all won on the platform of the Peoples Democratic Party.

== Overview ==
Affiliation	Party		Total
Affiliation	PDP	AD	Total
Before Election			3
After Election	3	0	3

== Summary ==
District	Incumbent	Party	Elected Senator	Party
Delta North			Patrick Osakwe	PDP
Delta Central			Felix Ibru	PDP
Delta South			James Manager	PDP

== Results ==
=== Delta North ===
The election was won by Patrick Osakwe of the Peoples Democratic Party.

2003 Nigerian Senate election in Delta State
Party	Candidate	Votes	%
PDP	Patrick Osakwe		
Total votes			
PDP hold			

=== Delta Central ===
The election was won by Felix Ibru of the Peoples Democratic Party.

2003 Nigerian Senate election in Delta State
Party	Candidate	Votes	%
PDP	Felix Ibru		
Total votes			
PDP hold			

=== Delta South ===
The election was won by James Manager of the Peoples Democratic Party.

2003 Nigerian Senate election in Delta State
Party	Candidate	Votes	%
PDP	James Manager		
Total votes			
PDP hold			
