= 2011 Nigerian Senate elections in Delta State =

2011 Nigerian Senate election in Delta State

The 2011 Nigerian Senate election in Delta State was held on 9 April 2011, to elect members of the Nigerian Senate to represent Delta State. Ifeanyi Okowa representing Delta North and James Manager representing Delta South won on the platform of Peoples Democratic Party, while Akpor Pius Ewherido representing Delta Central won on the platform of Democratic People's Party.

== Overview ==
Affiliation	Party		Total
Affiliation	PDP	DPP	Total
Before Election			3
After Election	2	1	3

== Summary ==
District	Incumbent	Party	Elected Senator	Party
Delta North			Ifeanyi Okowa	PDP
Delta South			James Manager	PDP
Delta Central			Akpor Pius Ewherido	DPP

== Results ==
=== Delta North ===
Peoples Democratic Party candidate Ifeanyi Okowa won the election, defeating other party candidates.

2011 Nigerian Senate election in Delta State
Party	Candidate	Votes	%
PDP	Ifeanyi Okowa		
Total votes			
PDP hold			

=== Delta South ===
Peoples Democratic Party candidate James Manager won the election, defeating other party candidates.

2011 Nigerian Senate election in Delta State
Party	Candidate	Votes	%
PDP	James Manager		
Total votes			
PDP hold			

=== Delta Central ===
Democratic People's Party candidate Akpor Pius Ewherido won the election, defeating other party candidates.

2011 Nigerian Senate election in Delta State
Party	Candidate	Votes	%
DPP	Akpor Pius Ewherido		
Total votes			
DPP hold			
