= Monday Onyeme =

Nigerian politician and chartered accountant

His Excellency Monday Onyeme

Deputy Governor of Delta State
- Incumbent
- Assumed office 29 May 2023
- Governor: Sheriff Oborevwori
- Preceded by: Kingsley Otuaro

Chairman, Delta State Board of Internal Revenue (DBIR)
- In office 2015–2022

Personal details
- Born: Monday John Onyeme; 30 March 1965 (age 61) Ibabu, Onicha Ukwuani, Delta State, Nigeria.
- Party: People's Democratic Party
- Occupation: Politician; Accountant

Monday John Onyeme (born 30 March 1965) is a Nigerian politician and chartered accountant who has been the Deputy Governor of Delta State since May 2023. He was sworn in on May 29 alongside the Governor, Sheriff Oborevwori after winning the 2023 gubernatorial election in March 2023.

== Background and early life ==
Monday Onyeme is a native of Ibabu, Onicha Ukwuani In Ndokwa West LGA of Delta State where he was born on 30 March 1965. He got his First Primary School Leaving Certificate in Army Children School, Sokoto, Sokoto State, before proceeding to Government Secondary School, Gummi, Kebbi State for his secondary education between 1977 and 1982. He's a graduate of Accountancy from the University of Calabar where he finished in 1990. He started his working career as a lecturer with Federal Polytechnic Kaura Namoda, Zamfara State between 1991 and 1992, and later joined Commercial Trust Bank Lagos from 1993 to 1995. He worked as Chief Accountant of Octopus Credential Limited in Lagos between 1995 and 1996 and National Agriculture Land Development Authority, Asaba from 1996 to 2000 as Head of Finance and Supply department. He joined the Federal College of Education (Technical) Asaba as the Chief Accountant in 2000 and later became the Bursar in 2005. In 2006, He was appointed the Bursar of the National Open University, Lagos, which he held for nine years.

== Political career ==
Monday Onyeme was appointed Chairman of the Delta State Board of Internal Revenue in 2015, and was reappointed in 2019 for another term. On 23 June 2022, He was announced the deputy governorship candidate and running mate to the governorship candidate, Sheriff Oborevwori.
