= Enebeli Elebuwa =

Nigerian actor (1947–2012)

- Born: Enebeli Elebuwa; 1946; Nigeria
- Died: 5 December 2012 (aged 65–66); India
- Occupation: Actor

Enebeli Elebuwa (1946–2012) was a Nigerian actor.

== Early life ==
Elebuwa was born in Delta State. He was of Ukwuani origin from the Isumpe quarters of Utagba-Uno in the Ndokwa-West Local Government Area.

== Death ==
Elebuwa suffered a stroke and was flown abroad for medical treatment. He died at the age of 66 in a hospital in India on 5 December 2012 and was buried at Vaults & Gardens, Ajah, Lagos, formerly Victoria Court Cemetery.

== Filmography ==
- Royal War (2009) as Chief Okalibe
- Bent Arrows (2010) as Mr. Okey
- Against My Blood (2006)
- A Prize to Pay (2006)
- City of Kings (2006) as Agbalanze
- Peoples' Club (2006)
- Last Dance (2006)
- South Connection (2004)
- Abuja Connection (2003)
- Honey (2003)
- Amadas (1998)
- Oracle (1998)
