= Kingsley Otuaro =

Nigerian politician and businessman

His Excellency Kingsley Otuaro
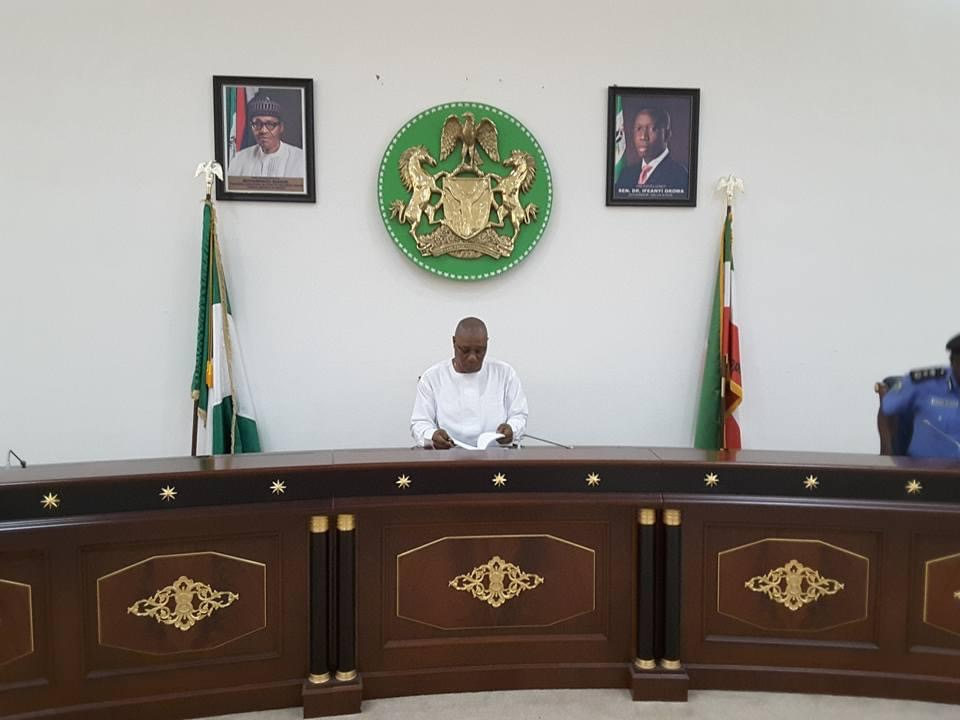

Deputy Governor of Delta State
- In office 29 May 2015 – 29 May 2023
- Governor: Ifeanyi Okowa
- Preceded by: Amos Utuama
- Succeeded by: Monday Onyeme

Personal details
- Born: 16 April 1968 (age 58) Oporoza,Warri South West, Delta State, Nigeria.
- Party: People's Democratic Party
- Children: 4
- Education: Ambrose Alli University, University of Ibadan
- Occupation: Politician

Kingsley Burutu Otuaro (born 16 April 1968) is a Nigerian politician and businessman who served as deputy governor of Delta State from May 2015 to May 2023.

== Education ==
Otuaro obtained his LLB with honours in 1999 from the Bendel State University (now Ambrose Alli University). He was called to the bar in 2005. He served as a special adviser to James Ibori on community affairs.

== Career ==
Otuaro served as the commissioner representing the Ijaw ethnic nationality on the board of the Delta State Oil Producing Areas Development Commission (DESOPADEC) before the board was dissolved. On the reconstitution of the DESOPADEC board, Governor Emmanuel Uduaghan reappointed him to serve in the same capacity from 2012 to 2014. Otuaro is member of the Peoples Democratic Party. He contested the 25 May 2022 primary election, in which Sheriff Oborevwori was declared the winner.
