= Sunny Ofehe =

Nigerian-Dutch activist and politician

- Born: 1 February 1972 (age 54); Lagos, Nigeria
- Education: University of Benin (BS)
- Political party: All Progressive Congress
- Movement: Niger Delta conservation
- Website: sunnyofehe.org

Sunny Ofehe is a Nigeria-born, Dutch environmental rights and human rights activist and a Nigerian political candidate whose activities focus on the environmental degradation human rights abuse in the oil-rich Niger Delta region of Nigeria. He was a governorship aspirant in the 2019 Nigerian governorship election in the oil rich Delta State under the ruling All Progressive Congress (APC) party., and a Delta State Governorship candidate in the 2023 general elections in Nigeria under the Young Progressive Party (YPP).

== Early life and education ==
Sunny Oghale Ofehe was born on 1 February 1972 in Lagos, Nigeria, to Chief Bernard Aghogho and Theresa Ofehe of Iyede, Isoko North Council area of Delta State.

Ofehe completed his primary education at Ogelle Primary School, Ughelli, Delta State, in 1983. His secondary education was completed at Unity School Agbarho also in Delta State in 1988. In 1991, Ofehe gained admission into the University of Benin to study industrial chemistry. He graduated in 1995.

After the annulled election of the late chief Moshood Abiola, Ofehe became an activist while in the university. He mobilized his fellow students to demonstrate against the annulment of the presidential election by the then-military Head of State, Ibrahim Babangida. Ofehe played an active role in the civil demonstrations led by the Student Union movement calling on the military junta to vacate power and confirm Chief MKO Abiola as the democratically elected president of the Federal Republic of Nigeria.

Started International/European Law B.Sc. program at The Hague University of Applied Sciences in the Netherlands in 2016 and suspended the studies to take part in the Delta State governorship elections in 2019.

== Career ==
Ofehe fled Nigeria for the Netherlands on 26 November 1995 where he sought political asylum to escape the hunt by the Abacha-led military government.

Ofehe's mother Mrs. Theresa Noghayin Ofehe sold their family home in Benin-City for Ofehe to be able to travel out of the country. Ofehe travelled to Kano State where he stayed for six months before he was able to board the KLM flight from Kano to Amsterdam where he arrived on 27 November 1995 and immediately requested political asylum at the airport. He was taken to a Dutch city called Zevenaar near the German border for processing and was eventually transferred to an asylum camp in the Dutch city of Kampen. In 1996 he moved to Rotterdam through the help of a childhood friend and eventually met his current wife Mrs. Dorothy Faluy-Ofehe and together they now have four children: all boys!

Ofehe founded a non-governmental organization, Hope for the Niger Delta Campaigns (HNDC) headquartered in Rotterdam, Netherlands, in 2005. HNDC is focused on bringing the plight of the people of the Niger Delta to international awareness. The HNDC facilitated a dialogue with the militants in the creeks of the Niger Delta in 2005 in the midst of the face-off between the militants and the State security outfits. Ofehe adopted a non-violent approach to his advocacy and played a prominent role in bringing an end to hostage taking in the Niger Delta. His campaign led to the release of Dutch kidnapped oil worker. Ofehe was instrumental in a litigation involving four Niger Delta farmers brought against Royal Dutch Shell in The Hague with a ruling in January 2013 in favor of one of the farmers.

A publication of a monthly Niger Delta Diaspora magazine called "Inside Niger Delta Magazine" was established by Ofehe to increase the awareness raising of the situation of the Niger Delta region to global attention, began as part of Ofehe's commitment to expose the plight of the people in the Niger Delta region to the world.

=== Government's recognition and invitation ===
Due to his activities to foster peace in the Niger Delta region, Nigeria's former president, Goodluck Jonathan, extended an invitation to Ofehe. He brought with him some foreign investors during the visit to the Nigerian former President H.E. Dr. Goodluck Jonathan. He also addressed the Ad-Hoc Committee on the Niger Delta Crisis of the Nigeria House of Representative and eventually invited 15 members of the House and three Members of the House South - South Parliamentary Caucus to the Netherlands and the European Union in Brussels in 2009.

On 25 and 26 February 2010, Ofehe hosted stakeholders in the Niger Delta Peace process to an international Conference in The Hague, Netherlands, that was instrumental in finding a solution to the problems of youth restiveness in the Niger Delta region and also invited an aide to the then Nigerian President on Niger Delta and Head of the Nigerian Presidential Amnesty Programme, Kingsley Kuku, to engage senior European politicians in Paris including addressing the Institute of French Foreign Relations (IFRI) in Paris, France and a selected European Union Committee members in Brussels, Belgium.

This led to a Dutch member of Parliament Sharon Gesthuizen and Dutch embassy officials in Nigeria to visit the slums and devastated areas of the Niger Delta caused by oil exploitation. Ofehe was the facilitator of this trip by the Dutch Member of Parliament Ms. Sharon Gesthuizen. The outcome led to a Dutch parliamentary hearing about Shell in January 2011 at the Dutch Parliament in The Hague with Ofehe a major keynote speaker alongside speakers from Amnesty International, Friends of the Earth, Cordaid with Shell present at the hearing.

=== Escaped bomb blast, arrest and detention ===
Ofehe narrowly escaped a bomb blast that rocked his room at the Delta State government guest house in Asaba, Delta State, Nigeria. He was in Asaba, Delta State on the invitation of the then Executive Governor of Delta State, H.E. Dr. Emmanuel Uduaghan.

He was arrested by the Nigeria State Security Services after a staff at the Nigerian Embassy in The Hague wrote a politically motivated report against him. The report which was later exposed to be libelous and character assassination was written by a lady staff of the Nigerian Intelligence Agency (NIA) working at the Nigerian embassy in The Hague around 2008. He has been subsequently harassed and intimidated at border crossing anytime he visits Nigeria. He has had several meetings with the Department of State Security Services to clear his name, but he still gets harassed at the airport.

On 8 April 2022, Ofehe petitioned the Director General of the Department of State Security Services (DSS) and the National Intelligence Agency (NIA) of Nigeria before the Nigerian Senate Committee on Ethics, Privileges and Public Petitions asking the Senate to intervene and get his name of their watch-list. In the hearing the DSS was absent, but the NIA was represented and denied ever placing Ofehe's name on the watch-list. The Senate committee adjourned the hearing for 15 April in other to allow the DSS appear. The second hearing came and both agencies refused to appear. The House committee continued their investigation and after evidence showed that the accusations and watch-listing was illegally carried out, his name was eventually removed after 13 years.

In February 2011, he was arrested by the Dutch Police after around 30 officers raided his home in Rotterdam in the early hours of the morning and detained for 14 days. He was later charged with terrorism in a case that attracted international condemnation. The case was later dropped for lack of evidence and proof of evidence manipulation by the Dutch State became visible in some wire taped conversations recorded.

In 2015, Ofehe led four other Dutch nationals to cover the sufferings of 12 cluster communities located around the Nigerian two biggest offshore drilling platforms; the Bonga oilfield and the EA oil fields with combined daily production of almost 500,000 bpd in Southern Ijaw in Bayelsa State and they were kidnapped. The kidnap attracted global attention and Ofehe appeared on the Dutch television show "Pauw"

=== International engagement ===
Since 2011 on a yearly basis, Ofehe has addressed the plenary session United Nations Forum on Minority Issues in Geneva, Switzerland where he has always advocated for the rights of the minority people of the oil rich Niger Delta region of Nigeria. He has also participated at events organized by the Unrepresented Nations Peoples Organization (UNPO) in Brussels, Belgium, Geneva, Switzerland and Italian Senate in Rome, Italy. He has also been involved in several discuss and engagements at the European Parliament, European Council and the European Commission in Brussels, Belgium.

He invited the paramount ruler of the Warri Kingdom, the Olu of Warri, His Royal Majesty His Royal Majesties, Ogiame Atuwatse III, the Olu of Warri and Her Majesty, Olori Atuwatse III, the Queen Consort of Warri kingdom to engage selected members of the European Parliament and specifically the African, Caribbean and Pacific - EU at the EU Parliament in Brussels, Belgium with a delegation in May 2023 to discuss potential collaboration between the European Union and the Warri Kingdom. The visit included discussions with EU officials at the EU Commission and was focused on topics such as economic development and environmental sustainability, particularly in the context of the Niger Delta region.

At the International World Water Day celebration in March, Ofehe has been a major guest speaker at the 2021 Inter Eco Forum Conference in Marbella, Spain. In 2021, Ofehe alongside former Dutch MP Harry van Bommel invited the members of the Nigerian Senate Committee on Public Complains, Ethics and Privileges to Leiden, the Netherlands for a training. The delegation was led by the committee's chairman Senator Ayo Akinyelure, Senator Mathew Urhoghide, Senator Mrs. Uche Ekwunife and Senator Utazi Chukwuka.

Ofehe who always refer to the late Ogoni environmental activist Ken Saro-Wiwa as his mentor organizes events every 10 November to commemorate the execution of Ken Saro-Wiwa and the eight Ogoni martyrs who were executed in 1995 by the Nigerian military junta of late Gen. Sanni Abacha.

=== Politics ===
In 2017, Ofehe declared for the governorship race of Delta state as an All Progressive Congress candidate. He said he wanted to be governor to put an end to the sufferings of his people and bring about diversified sources of revenue to Delta state and reduce the dependency on oil and federal allocations. Ofehe later stepped down after top party chieftains weighed in and said they will unanimously endorse Chief Great Ogboru as the APC candidate for 2019.

Ofehe who has travelled globally with experience and credibility within his network considers himself the 'best candidate for the governorship race in Delta State'. In 2022, Ofehe was unanimously affirmed during the primary election of the Young Progressives Party (YPP) as the party's Delta State governorship candidate for the 2023 election.

In the 2023 Delta State Governorship election debate organized by the Arise Television news, Ofehe was unanimously adjudged the most outstanding with a clear vision and purpose to govern the state. After the election, the winner and current Governor of Delta State approached him to serve under his administration where he is currently the Executive Assistant to the Governor of Delta State, H.E. Sheriff Oborevwori on External Relations and Diaspora Affairs.

He was recently appointed by the Africa CEO Club as the Vice President, Environmental Sustainability & European Relations. He was designated the duties at the intersection of sustainability, corporate leadership, and EU-Africa relations.

== Personal life ==
Ofehe's partner is Dorothy Faluy and they have lived together since 1997 and married in 2004 in Benin City, Nigeria. They have four children (sons) and a grand daughter. The family lives in Rotterdam, The Netherlands.

Ofehe's 60-year-old mother was strangled to death in his family home in Benin City on 4 October 2007 by assailants suspected to be hired assassins. It took 10 years for Ofehe to give his mother a befitting funeral in 2017. It was at the funeral that several top Nigerians who attended the ceremony advised him to contest for public office in the 2019 elections.

== Honors and recognition ==
- He is a fellow at the Federal University of Petroleum Resources Centre for Sustainable Development.
- Honorary Doctorate Degree of Philosophy in Public Policy from the Prowess University, Delaware, United States
- He is a prominent international development expert and the Vice President of Environmental Sustainability & European Relations for the Africa CEO Club.
- Board Member, Global Centre for Innovative Leaders (GCIL), London, United Kingdom.
- Director Global Partnerships at Diplomat Link, The Netherlands.
- Director, China - Nigeria Market Access & Investment for the China - Africa Smart Link Studio
- Honorary Life Time Membership Award as an AMBASSADOR with the Global Good Governance Ambassadors Forum (A United Nations Volunteer) in recognition of his "selfless efforts and sincerity in promoting good governance policies and kindness to humanity within his region."
- The 2024 Global Mindset Media Achievers "Excellence Award" as the most innovative Global Investments Networker of the Year."
- "Global Good Governance Ambassador 2022 Award" recipient of Excellence in Leadership and Global Activism of the year with integrity.
- Recipient of The Voice "2012 Outstanding African Environmentalist" award recipient.
- He is the Winner of the Africa4u Online Awards for Africans in Europe.
- "Africa Development Award 2013" in recognition of his advocacy and contribution to the development in Africa from SLDF.
- "Honorary Award Recipient 2014" of African Diaspora Merits Awards (ADMA) in The Netherlands.
- "2014 Africa 4U Achievement Award for Africans in Holland" in recognition of his valuable contributions to the development of Africans in Holland.
- The AWOL Continental Europe "Human Rights Activist Award 2016"
- The Voice Magazine Achievers Award "African Political Figure Award 2017" in recognition of his services to and leadership to humanity."
- The 2017 Change Makers Club International (CMCi) "Excellent Service Award in recognition of his "Sterling performance and exceptional contributions towards building a better society through valuable contribution to youth development and societal transformation and his huge support towards the CMCi vision."
- "Award of Excellence" from the National Association of Post Graduate Students from his Alumni University of Benin, Benin – City, Nigeria for his "extra ordinary achievements in his chosen Career and contributions to the society."
- Special Patron Award from the Forum of Delta State NGOs in "Recognition of his immense contribution to the Peace & Sustainable Development of Delta State."
