= Akwukwu-Igbo =

- Interactive map of Akwukwu-Igbo
- Coordinates: 6°21′26.842″N 6°35′30.592″E
- Country: Nigeria
- State: Delta

Akwukwu-Igbo is an Igbo town the headquarters of Oshimili North Local Government Area of Delta State, Nigeria. It is located in the Delta North senatorial zone of the state. The occupation of the locals are mainly farming and fishing and It is made up of several quarters which includes Ogbe-Ani, Ogbe-Onihe, Umu-Onai, Ogbe-Obi, Ogbe-Iyase, Umuekeke, Achala, Umu-Olum, Umu-Opu etc. This land is sometimes called the "Land of Desert Warriors".

It has neighbouring communities in the same local government area such as Illah, Ebu, Okpanam, Onitcha-Olona etc. The current traditional ruler of Akwukwu-igbo is Obi David Azuka I who hails from Ogbe-Obi quarters. This town also has primary and secondary schools amongst which two very old schools are Agbogidi Primary School and Akwukwu-Igbo Grammar School.

== Notable people from Akwukwu-Igbo ==
- Newton Jibunoh
- Obi David Azuka I
- Enyi Doris Mokobia
- Chief Michael Ashikodi Agbamuche former Attorney General of the Federal Republic of Nigeria.
