= Agbarho =

Town in Delta State, Nigeria

Coordinates: 5.5888°N 5.8606°E

Agbarho is a town in the Ughelli North LGA of Delta State, Nigeria.

It is also one of the kingdoms that make up the Urhobo Tribe.

The Urhobo are the main tribes living within this area. They speak the Agbarho dialect of Urhobo, which is the target dialect standard dialect for literacy in Urhobo language.

The Agbarho people have a traditional ruler who leads the whole of Agbarho Kingdom, known as the Osuivie of Agbarho Kingdom.

== Population ==
Agbarho is one of the most populated towns in Delta State, with an estimated population of over 500,000 people. Agbarho is made up of communities such as the Oguname, Ophori, Oviri, Oghara of Agbarho, Uvwiamuge, Ughrugheli, Uvwiama Ekrerhavwe, Ikwegwu Okrherhe, Orhokpokpor, Orho-Agbarho, Ekwerhe. E.t.c.

The people of Agbarho are mainly farmers and businessmen/women.

Some of the schools of this region include the Popular; Unity School Agbarho, Agbarho Grammar School, St. Endas College Agbarho and others such as Agbarho Model Primary School, Isherhe Primary School and Evwrutu Primary School.

There is also a government owned and operated hospital which lies at the outskirts of the town and on the way to Ohrerhe community.

There are five stars hotels that will suit any visitors taste.

The town has since the early 70's had facilities like a post office, pipe-borne water supply and electricity. However, the satellite villages had none of these facilities until the 1990s ushered in a new development drive which began to open up these interiors. Notable of such drives was a self-help electrification project instituted by businessman Late Chief. John Mononia Agbatutu for Ohrerhe community.

Agbarho traditional rulership has been by the Osuivie who rules with an advisory body comprising traditional chiefs from whom the chronologically foremost in the chieftaincy institution succeeds the Osuivie.

There is also an administrative body known as Agbarho Urhobo Improvement Union (AUIU) which has the responsibility of development and policy making.
