= Uvwie =

Uvwie Ẹphrọn Effurun
- Urban Area
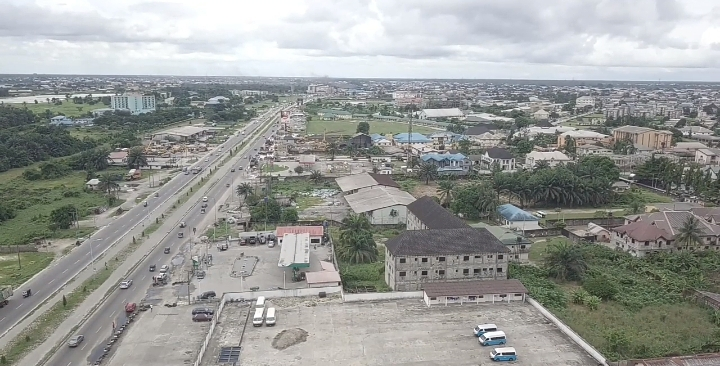
- Interactive map of Uvwie
- Location within Nigeria
- Coordinates: 5°33′0″N 5°46′0″E
- Country: Nigeria
- State: Delta State
- Conurbation: Warri
- Headquarters: Effurun

Government
  - Type: Local Government Chairman
  - Chairman: Ramson Onoyake

Area
  - Total: 92.41 km^{2} (35.68 sq mi)

Population (2022)
  - Total: 258,700
  - Density: 2,799.48/km^{2} (7,250.6/sq mi)
- Time zone: UTC+1 (WAT)

Uvwie (/hu-we-ɛ/), is a principal urban Local government area in Delta State. It lies along the Warri River and it is one of the 24 Urhobo kingdoms. The entirety of the LGA is a border town to the city of Warri.

The term Uvwie primarily refers to the indigenous people of the geographic region, Uvwie also doubles as the name of the language and the kingdom of Uvwie.

Effurun, the traditional and political headquarters of Uvwie kingdom/local government area, is now used to refer to the city itself; it is a border town that acts as the gateway to the city of Warri and is often mistaken for Warri itself even though both are two entirely different local government areas. This LGA has a population of 188,728 people as at the 2006 census.

The metropolitan area is known nationwide as Effurun metropolis.

== History ==
The introduction of British colonialism in the late nineteenth century made Uvwie to become part of modern-day Nigeria which was created by the amalgamation of the protectorates of Northern and Southern Nigeria in 1914. Since then foreign cultural pins like changes in the system of governance, dress codes, diets, Uvwie traditional architecture, economic activities and language have been inserted in the traditional culture. In response, the Uvwie traditional culture has strived to be assertive, on the one hand, and accepted to be an undercurrent, on the other hand.

Uvwie was a clan until 1954 when it became a Kingdom with the introduction of monarchy and Johnson Ejuvwiekoko Edjekohwo Eruohwo was crowned as Eruphwo II, the Ovie of Uvwie Kingdom on 1 December 1954. Political reforms have also made Uvwie a local government in the Delta State. Uvwie is being governed by the government of Delta State, the Uvwie Local Government, and the Uvwie monarch, which is responsible for the traditional governance of the Uvwie kingdom subject to the constitution of Nigeria and other laws.

== Geography ==
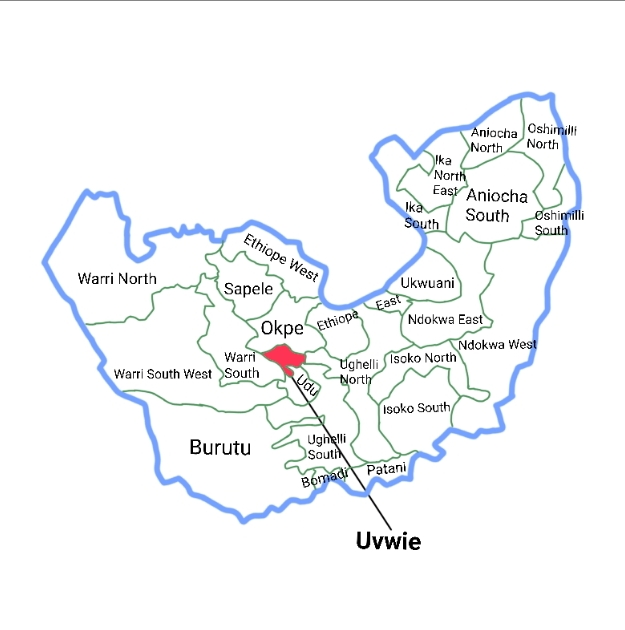
Map of Delta State indicating Uvwie

Uvwie is bounded by Okpe to the North, Udu to the South, Warri South to the West, Ughelli North to the East and Ughelli South to the South Eastern axis.

Until the 60s and 70s Uvwie and Warri was separated by arces of bushes and virgin lands there was an obvious boundary between both areas, during the exploration of Oil in the creeks, the former administrative capital and closest hinterland, Warri, attained a city status, due to the citing of various oil companies and firms the 30 km² town became congested. The western axis of Warri (Warri South West, Warri North and other parts of Warri South) had a swampy terrain so the expansion of the then booming city drifted towards its closest neighboring uplands, Uvwie, reason Uvwie plays host to the Warri Refinery and Petro Chemicals at Ekpan-Effurun and the former Warri Airport at Ugborikoko-Effurun and other Major institutes in the Metropolis

== Residential areas ==
Some of Uvwie's more popular and well-known neighborhoods are Effurun GRA (government reserved area), Bendel Estate, Niger cat, Enerhen Junction, Uti Road, Ebrumede community, Okoribi, Ugbolokposo community, Okuatata/Ugbomro community, Iterigbi community, Alegbo Quarter, Alaka Quarter, Erovie Quarter, Jakpa Quarter, Aka Avenue, Enerhen community, NNPC housing complex, PTI, Ugboroke community, Ugborikoko community, FUPRE road, Refinery road, Effurun-Sapele road, Afieki Quarters, Udumuovwori Quarters. The main industrial area is located in Ekpan and the central town of Effurun.

== Demography ==
=== People ===
Uvwie people (a distinct subgroup of Urhobo) are the indigenous inhabitants of Uvwie, however due to her cosmopolitan status it has experienced a large influx of non-natives most especially the Ijaw, Isoko, Igbo and Itsekiri peoples.

=== Religion ===
The city is predominantly Christian, of Orthodox and Pentecostal denominations, but there is a sizeable populace that practices the Igbé religion with a few noticeable Muslims (from Northern Nigeria especially)

=== Language ===
Due to the multicultural and multiethnic background of the recent inhabitants of the city, the Warri dialect of the Nigerian Pidgin is commonly used as a means of communication, reason why the Uvwie language is gradually going extinct as it is not commonly spoken, even amongst natives

== Climate ==
Uvwie has an average temperature of 25 °C and has a number of rivers and streams flowing within its territory. The city witnesses two distinct seasons which are the dry and the rainy seasons with the total precipitation in the city put at an estimated 3170 mm of rainfall per annum

Temperature throughout the year in the city is relatively constant, showing little variation throughout the course of the year. Average temperature are typically between 25 °C - 28 °C in the City

== Economics and infrastructure ==
Uvwie is the economic nerve center of Warri metropolitan area and Delta State at large. Uvwie plays hosts to major revenue generating centers such as Gbagi Mall, Effurun. Delta Mall (ShopRite), Effurun. Warri Refinery and Petro Chemicals, Ekpan. Nigeria Gas Company, Ekpan. Water Resources, Ugborikoko. etc.

Uvwie houses most of the roads network linking the main town of Warri to other parts of the metropolis such as Osubi, Okuokoko in Okpe, Ovwian, Mofor in Udu, Otokutu etc.

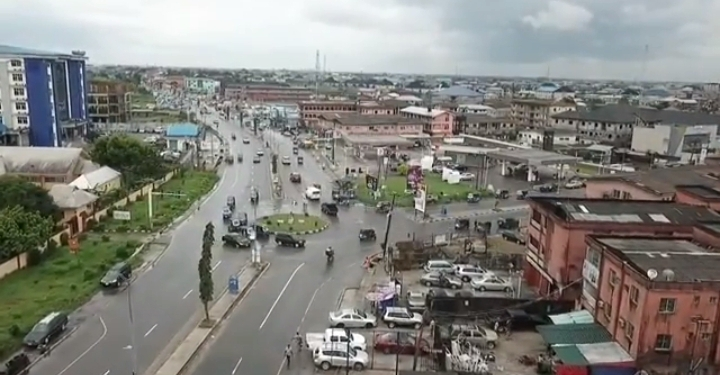
Aerial view of Enerhen Junction, Enerhen, Uvwie

Enerhen Junction in Enerhen, Uvwie serves as a linkage between Uvwie, Warri and Udu.

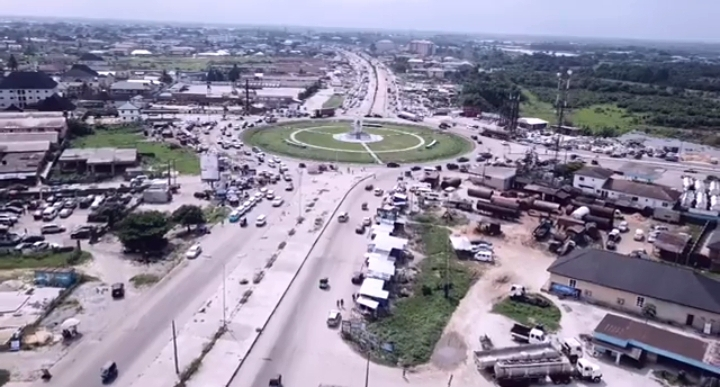
Aerial view of DSC roundabout, Ebrumede, Uvwie

DSC roundabout is the gateway to the Delta Steel Company (DSC), Ovwian-Aladja at Udu, it also connects Okuokoko in Okpe, Uvwie and Otokutu near Udu.

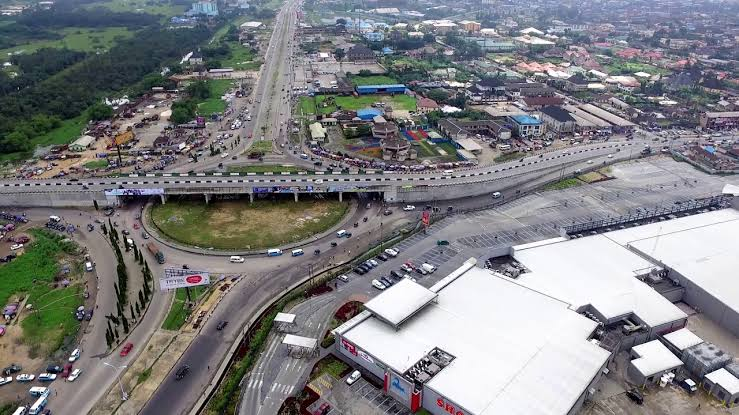
Effurun Roundabout in Effurun, Uvwie is the central spot in Uvwie and also a strategic location from other parts of Nigeria to the rest of the South-South, It is one of the routes that links Benin City via Benin-Sapele-Effurun to Port Harcourt City via Effurun-Ughelli-Port Harcourt. It is the gateway into the main town of Warri in Warri South LGA, gateway to Warri Port, Ugbangwe-Warri via NPA express, gateway to Warri Refinery, Ekpan-Effurun (Uvwie).

== Notable people ==
- Sydney Talker
- Festus Keyamo

== See also ==
- Warri
- Ughelli
- Sapele
- Asaba
- Agbor
- Abraka
- Udu
