= Patrick Osakwe =

Nigerian politician (1948–2022)

Patrick Enebeli Osakwe

Senator of the Federal Republic of Nigeria from Delta State
- In office May 1999 – May 2011
- Succeeded by: Ifeanyi Arthur Okowa
- Constituency: Delta North

Personal details
- Born: 11 August 1948 Nigeria
- Died: 15 March 2022 (aged 73) London, England
- Party: Accord
- Education: University of Benin and Ambrose Ali University Ekopma
- Occupation: Businessman
- Profession: Legal Practitioner, Politician

Patrick Enebeli Osakwe (11 August 1948 – 15 March 2022) was a Nigerian senator who represented Delta North Senatorial District on the platform of Accord party. He became a member of the Nigerian Senate in 1999 and was re-elected in 2003 and 2007.

== Personal life ==
Osakwe was born on 11 August 1948. He was from Ugili-Amai in Ndokwa-west L.G.A of Delta State Nigeria. Osakwe obtained a B.Sc., M.Sc., LLB and BL from University of Benin.

He died in London on 15 March 2022, at the age of 73.

== Senate career ==
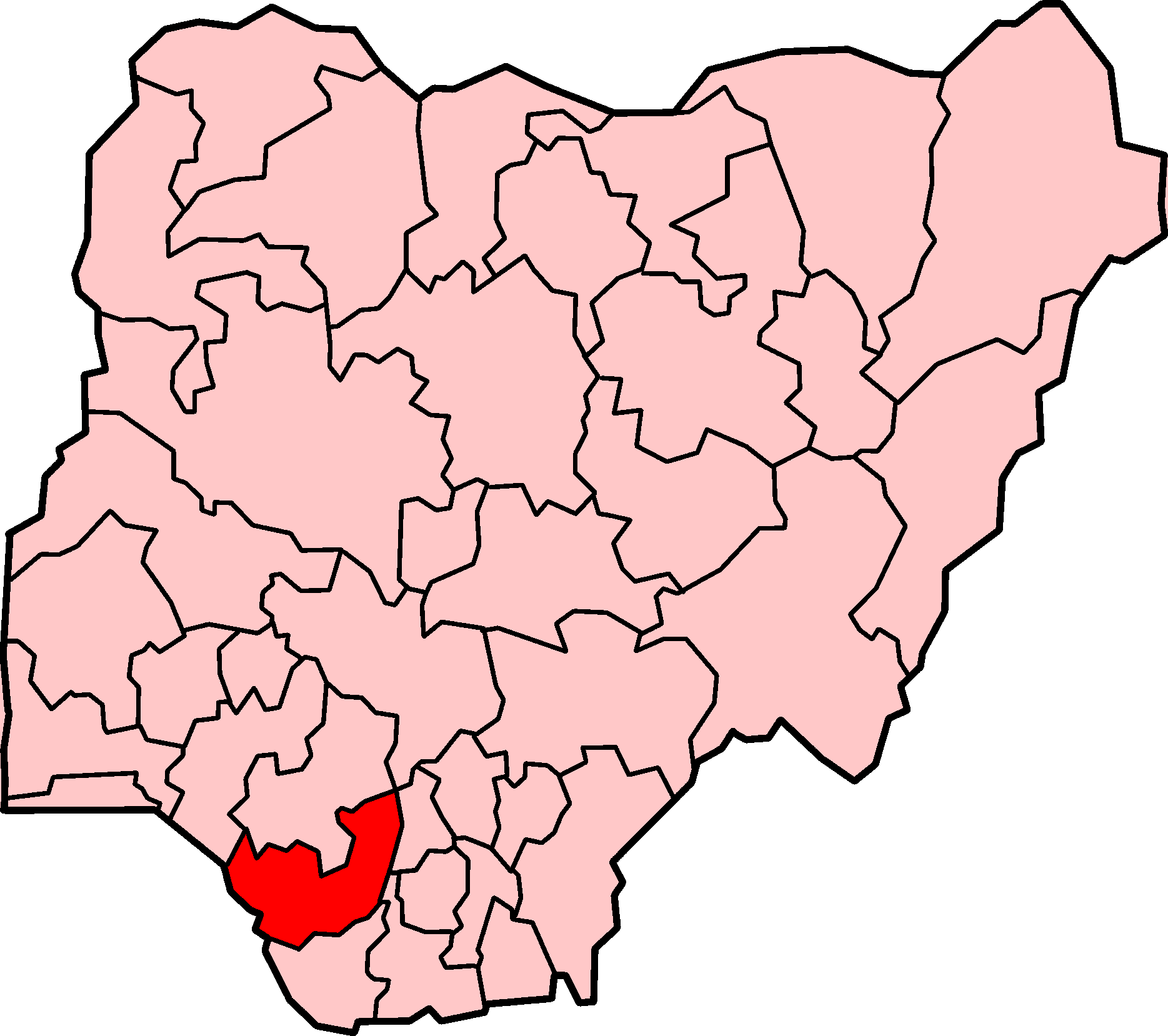
Delta State in Nigeria

Osakwe was elected to the Senate for the Delta North constituency in 1999. In October 2002, when there was a plan to impeach President Olusegun Obasanjo, he said that senators should not sign the impeachment document without first consulting their electorates. Shortly before the April 2003 elections, Osakwe denied being among the senators who endorsed the amendment of the Independent Corrupt Practices and other related offences Commission (ICPC) Act.

He was reelected in 2003 as candidate of the People's Democratic Party (PDP), despite a poor reputation for contributing to debates or motions in the upper chamber. He was elected again in 2007 representing the Accord party. He was appointed to committees on Gas, Banking, Insurance & Other Financial Institutions, Appropriation, Niger Delta and Senate Services.

In a January 2008 debate over the proposed Freedom of Information Bill, Osakwe asked why the bill was not signed by former President Olusegun Obasanjo. He noted that the act had to comply with the Official Secrets Act.

In May 2008, the Election Petition Tribunal in Asaba struck out a petition against the election of the Governor of Delta State, Emmanuel Uduaghan and Patrick Osakwe. The PDP candidate Mirian Comfort Ali had asserted that the Accord party did not validly present Patrick Osakwe as candidate for the election.

In July 2009, Osakwe, Deputy Chairman of the Senate committee on Gas, condemned the "over involvement" of the Federal Government in the oil and gas sector at a Delta State meeting to discuss the National Gas Master Plan.
