= Ogbe Ijaw =

Town in Delta State, Nigeria

Coordinates: 5°36′11″N 5°27′29″E

Ogbe Ijoh, Warri Kingdom (or Ogbe-Ijaw) is a town in Delta State, Nigeria in the city of Warri. The people who live here are mainly of the Ijaw tribe.
