= 2015 Delta State gubernatorial election =

Election for Governor of Delta State

- April 11, 2015
Nominee	Ifeanyi Okowa	Great Ogboru
Party	PDP	LP
Popular vote	724,680	130,028
Governor before election
Emmanuel Uduaghan
PDP
Elected Governor
Ifeanyi Okowa
PDP

The 2015 Delta State gubernatorial election was the 7th gubernatorial election of Delta State. Held on April 11, 2015, the People's Democratic Party nominee Ifeanyi Okowa won the election, defeating Great Ogboru of the LP.

== PDP primary ==
PDP candidate and a Senator, Ifeanyi Okowa defeated 17 other contestants to clinch the party ticket. He won with 406 votes to defeat his closest rival, Olorogun David Edevbie, who received 299 votes. Victor Ochei, former Speaker of Delta State House of Assembly received 185 votes, Ndudi Elumelu received 50 votes, Godsday Orubebe received 49 votes. Godswill Obielum received 22 votes. Sylvester Monye, Ovie Omo-Agege, Ngozi Olejeme and Sam Obi received 10 votes each. Peter Okocha received 6 votes. Festus Okobor received 5 votes. Tony Obuh received 5 votes. Charles Emetulu received 4 votes. Gabriel Oyibode and Johnson Opone both received 3 votes each. Kenneth Gbagi received 2 votes. Mike Uwaka received 1 vote. The Deputy Governor of the state, Amos Utuamah withdrew from the primary. 1,121 delegates was accredited. Amos Utuamah After the election, the outgoing Governor of the State Emmanuel Uduaghan urged the losers in the primaries to support the winner, Ifeanyi Okowa in the interest of the party.

=== Candidates ===
- Ifeanyi Okowa
- Olorogun David Edevbie
- Victor Ochei
- Ndudi Elumelu
- Godsday Orubebe
- Godswill Obielum
- Sylvester Monye
- Ovie Omo-Agege
- Ngozi Olejeme
- Sam Obi
- Festus Okobor
- Peter Okocha
- Tony Obuh
- Charles Emetulu
- Johnson Opone
- Gabriel Oyibode
- Kenneth Gbagi
- Mike Uwaka

== LP primary ==
Twenty three governorship aspirants picked form to contest under the LP. Eight aspirants returned their forms, three aspirants were disqualified and only five aspirants contested in the primaries. Four of the contestants later withdrew and adopted Great Ogboru as their consensus candidate.

=== Candidates ===
- Great Ogboru

== Other governorship aspirant and party ==
- Otega Emerhor, APC
- Atagbuzia Sixtus Chibueze, KP
- Idawene Oke Hezx, SDP
- Ibordor Irikefe Emmanuel, APGA
- Anthony Prest, UPN
- Joe Chukwu, ADC
- Ashikodi David, A
- Efemona Success Oraka, PDM
- Agbeyegbe Mathew Majemite Bob, ID
- Elloh Awele Oyinsi, MPPP
- Peters Emuakpoje-Erho, CPP
- Philips George Onnyemachi, UPP
- Okiogbero Jonathan Edhebru, NCP
- Onwubuya John Abraham, ACD
- Jane Oluremi-Bats One-Mohammed, PDC
- Paul Ala Isamadem, ACPN

== Results ==
A total of 18 candidates contested in the election. Ifeanyi Okowa from the PDP won the election, defeating Great Ogboru from the LP.

2015 Delta State gubernatorial election
Party	Candidate	Votes	%	±%
PDP	Ifeanyi Okowa	724,680		
LP	Great Ogboru	130,028		
PDP hold				

== Aftermath ==
After the election, Otega Emerhor from the All Progressives Congress challenged the outcome of the election at the Delta State Governorship Elections Petitions Tribunal. The APC candidate told the tribunal to cancel the elections and order a fresh one. The tribunal dismissed the petition and upheld the election of Ifeanyi Okowa. Great Ogboru from the LP also challenged the outcome of the election at the Delta State Governorship Elections Petitions Tribunal. The LP candidate with his petition marked EPT/DT/GOV/01/2019, told the tribunal that the winner and his party, the PDP were unduly credited with excess votes by the Independent National Electoral Commission and that there was multiple voting as well as voting without smart card reader accreditation. The tribunal dismissed the petition for failing to prove the allegations of voting without accreditation, illegal allocation of unlawful votes and multiple voting. The both cases by the APC and LP candidates was taken to the Appeal court. Delivering the judgement, the Appeal court affirmed the election of the PDP candidate, Ifeanyi Okowa and dismissed the appeal of the LP candidate for lacking in merit. The Appeal court also dismissed the appeal by the candidate of the APC and upheld the judgement of the tribunal. The both cases was also taken to Supreme court. On the judgement day, the Supreme court dismissed both petitions and said it's as an abuse of court process.
