= Friday Osanebi =

Nigerian politician

Friday Ossai Osanebi

Personal details
- Born: 7 October 1980 (age 45) Delta State, Nigeria
- Education: Enugu State University of Science and Technology, Enugu. Metallurgical Engineering

Friday Ossai Osanebi (born 7 October 1980) is a Nigerian politician and former lawmaker who represented Ndokwa East in the Delta State House of Assembly for three terms. He was the deputy governorship candidate of the APC in the 2023 general election.

== Early life and education ==
Osanebi was born on October 7, 1980 to Chief and Mrs Ossai Osanebi of Umuedem Quarters of Benekuku community, Ndokwa East, Delta State.

He attended Eke Model Primary School in Kwale, Ndokwa West and later Orogun Grammar School for his secondary education. Osanebi proceeded to Enugu State University of Science and Technology, (ESUT) where he studied Material and Metallurgical Engineering.

== Career ==
Osanebi was the member representing Ndokwa East Constituency in the Delta State House of Assembly, Subsequently serving as Deputy Speaker. He was the youngest legislator in the house.
