= Ngozi Olejeme =

Nigerian politician

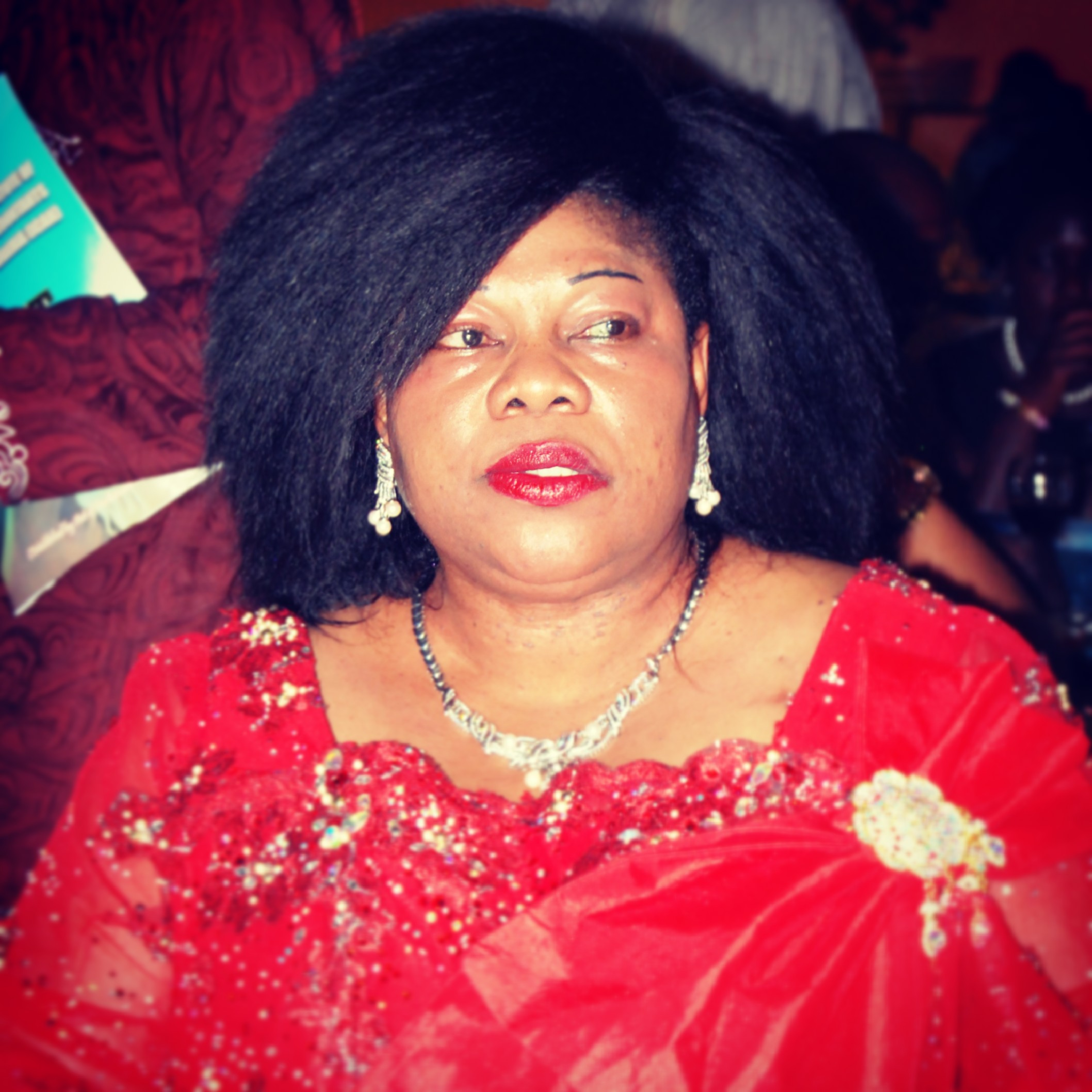
Ngozi Olejeme at the ICAN Awards ican

Ngozi Juliet Olejeme is a Nigerian, entrepreneur, politician and administrator. She once served as the Chairman of the Nigeria Social Insurance Trust Fund from 2009 to 2015.

She also worked as the financial secretary to the Goodluck Jonathan campaign organization during the 2015 general elections.

She was in June declared wanted for allegedly diverting N69bn from the agency but turned herself. Economic and Financial Crimes Commission (EFCC) has so far seized her 37 houses, frozen 30 bank accounts (each with at least 20m Naira), and a state of the art bathroom worth at least $2M.

She was a Delta State Gubernatorial Aspirant on the Platform of the Peoples Democratic Party (PDP).

== Career ==
Ngozi Olejeme was appointed chairman of the board, Nigeria Social Insurance Trust Fund (NSITF) in June 2009 by late President Umaru Musa Yar'Adua. She saw to the successful enactment into law of the Employees’ Compensation Act in December 2010, and the setting up of necessary human and physical infrastructure for the implementation of the Act, which was signed by President Goodluck Jonathan. She also took the helm as the Chairman of the Board of Trustfund Pensions Plc, in October 2009, but she no longer holds the position. She is also the convener of the Subsidy Reinvestment and empowerment program (SURE-P) sub-committee on Public Works and Road Rehabilitation. She held the position of Director of finance in the Goodluck Support Group (GSC), which was an organization set up for the support of President Goodluck Jonathan.

=== Non-profit work ===
The Ngozi Olejeme Foundation is a non-government organization set up by her to care for people who are most disadvantaged through its empowerment scheme and The Widowhood Projects. The empowerment scheme includes support for projects designed to enhance the employ-ability of young people and empowerment through vocational and skill building projects. The Widowhood Projects seeks to address the social cultural challenges of widows, it also empowers the widows and underprivileged woman with skills and grants for trade. The foundation recently donated cash prizes to 200 widows in Asaba, Delta State to enable them go into any business of their choosing.

=== Politics ===
Ngozi Olejeme has been an active politician in Nigeria, as she was a gubernatorial aspirant for Delta state under the auspices of the People’s Democratic Party PDP in the 2007 elections.

== Awards ==
1. Honorary Doctoral Degree by American Heritage University of Southern California (Doctor of Public Policy, Honoris Causa).
2. Prestigious Africa International Award, AIA Ghana.
3. Fellow, Civilian Institute of Democratic Administration, FCIDA, (Nigeria).
4. Fellow, Michael Imoudu National Institute of Labour Studies.
5. Champions of Workers Welfare Award by Labour Writers Associations of Nigeria.
6. Honorary Life Member/Commonwealth Ambassador of Royal Commonwealth Society, Nigeria.
7. Remember Africa Award by Family Education Helpline and Royal Commonwealth Society, London.
8. Nigeria Social Insurance Trust Fund (NSITF) 2010 Nigeria Female Entrepreneur Award.
9. Member, Board of Patrons, Congress of Muslim and Christian Youths for Unity.
10. Member, The Association of Business Executives London.
11. The Institute of Chartered Accountants of Nigeria (ICAN) Merit Award.
12. Women of Love Award
