= Ukwuani, Delta State =

Ukwuani
- LGA
- Interactive map of Ukwuani
- Coordinates: 5°50′41″N 6°14′15″E
- Country: Nigeria
- State: Delta State
- Headquarters: Obiaruku
- Time zone: UTC+1 (WAT)

Ukwuani is a Local Government Area of Delta State, Nigeria. Its headquarters are located in Obiaruku.

The postal code of the area is 112.

== Demographics ==
The area is mainly inhabited by the Ukwuani people found in Delta and Rivers states.

== Climate ==
The rainy season in Obiaruku is humid, oppressive, and cloudy, whereas the dry season is hot, muggy, and partially cloudy.
