= Ukwuani people =

Ethnicity in Nigeria

The Ukwuani people (also called Ndokwa people are an Igbo subgroup located in the southern part of Nigeria in the western part of the Niger Delta and other areas.

== Origin ==
Their origin is debated, with the narrative being that they are from Igbo and Benin. This has been challenged by Paul O. Opone, a lecturer at Delta State University, Abraka who argues that the evidence shows that they are of Igbo origin. The Ukwuani were categorized as Western-Igbo in ethnic anthropological books in the last century like The Ibo and Ibibio-speaking Peoples of South-eastern Nigeria with the language being a dialect of Igbo(page 136)

== Notable people ==
- Buchi, comedian
- Enebeli Elebuwa, actor and producer
- Uti Nwachukwu, model and actor; winner of Big Brother Africa: All-Stars
- Peter Odili, former governor of Rivers State
- Sunday Oliseh, footballer
- Patrick Osakwe, former senator
- Friday Osanebi, deputy speaker, Delta State House of Assembly
- Emeka Ossai, actor, producer and model

== See also ==
- Anioma Region
- Igboid languages
- Delta State
- Igbo people
