= Ifeanyi Okowa =

Nigerian politician and doctor (born 1959)

His Excellency Ifeanyi Okowa CON
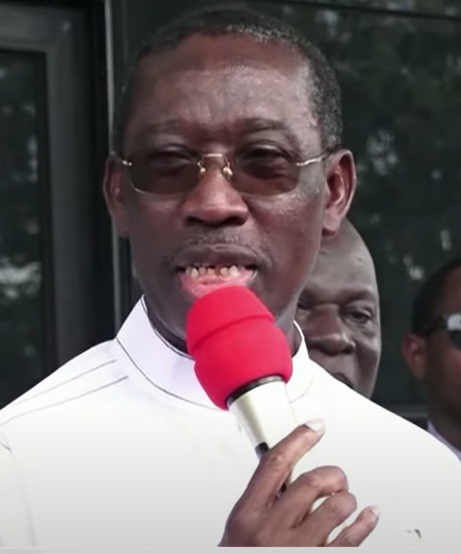

Governor of Delta State
- In office 29 May 2015 – 29 May 2023
- Deputy: Kingsley Otuaro
- Preceded by: Emmanuel Uduaghan
- Succeeded by: Sheriff Oborevwori

Senator for Delta North
- In office 29 May 2011 – 29 May 2015
- Preceded by: Patrick Osakwe
- Succeeded by: Peter Nwaoboshi

Personal details
- Born: Ifeanyichukwu Arthur Okowa; 8 July 1959 (age 67) Owa-Alero, Eastern Region, British Nigeria (now Owa-Alero, Delta State, Nigeria)
- Party: All Progressive Congress
- Other political affiliations: People Democratic Party
- Education: University of Ibadan
- Profession: Politician, medical doctor

Ifeanyichukwu Arthur Okowa CON (born 8 July 1959) is a Nigerian doctor and politician who served as Governor of Delta State from May 2015 to May 2023. He was a member of the People's Democratic Party, he was the party's vice presidential candidate in the 2023 presidential election running alongside Atiku Abubakar who was the presidential candidate.

Born in Owa-Alero in 1959, Okowa graduated from the University of Ibadan in 1981. After his undergraduate education, he worked as a medical officer for several years before entering politics. Okowa first established himself in local politics before entering the state cabinet of Governor James Ibori in 1999. After leaving cabinet in 2006, Okowa made a failed primary bid for governor before returning to the state cabinet under his former opponent Emmanuel Uduaghan. By 2011, Okowa moved to national politics and successfully ran for Senator for Delta North. After four years in the Senate, he returned to Delta and was elected governor by a wide margin in 2015 becoming the first ethnic Ika or person from the state's north to be governor. Okowa was later re-elected by a similar margin in 2019.

== Background ==
Okowa was born at Owa-Alero in Ika North-East Local Government Area of Delta State. He attended Edo College, Benin City (1970–1976), then went on to the University of Ibadan, where he studied medicine and surgery, graduating in 1981 with an MBBS degree. After leaving the National Youth Service Corps, he worked with the Bendel State Hospitals Management Board as a medical officer. He entered private practice as director, Victory Medical Centre, Igbanke, in 1986.

== Political career ==
Okowa became Secretary to the Ika Local Government and then Chairman of the Ika North-East Local Government Council (1991–1993). He was Delta North Coordinator of the Grassroots Democratic Movement (GDM). He joined the PDP in 1998, and assisted in Governor James Ibori's campaign in 1998/1999. He served as a commissioner in the Delta State government for Agriculture and Natural Resources (July 1999 – April 2001), Water Resources Development (April 2001 – May 2003) and Health (September 2003 – October 2006).

Okowa resigned to contest in the 2007 Delta State PDP governorship primaries, but did not win the governorship primaries. In June 2007, Ifeanyi was appointed Secretary to the Delta state Government.

Ifeanyi was elected Delta North Senatorial candidate in the January 2011 PDP primaries with 942 votes, but the result was challenged by party leaders who favoured Marian Amaka Alli as candidate. He was re-elected in a rerun where he scored 1,446 votes, against 108 votes for Marian Alli. In the April 2011 election for the Delta North Senatorial seat, Ifeanyi won 98,140 votes, ahead of runner up Prince Ned Munir Nwoko of the Democratic People's Party, who won 67,985 votes. It was reported that there was still tension regarding the election in January 2013. Ifeanyi finally clinched the ticket for the gubernatorial election in 2015 under the PDP with 406 votes on 8 December 2014. He won the Delta State Gubernatorial elections 2015 in April 2015 with 724,680 votes and was inaugurated as Governor on 29 May 2015. In the 9 March 2019 Governorship election, Okowa, a member of the Peoples Democratic Party, got 925,274 votes to defeat his opponent, the All Progressives Congress candidate, Great Ogboru, who garnered, 215,938 votes.

As a sitting governor of Delta State in 2020, he established University of Delta in his home town Agbor. He also set up University of Science and Technology in Ozoro and Dennis Osadebe University in Anwai all in Delta State.

In 2023, Ifeanyi Okowa contested in the Nigerian general elections as the vice-presidential candidate of the Peoples Democratic Party (PDP), alongside the party’s presidential candidate, Atiku Abubakar. Okowa was announced as running mate on June 16, 2022 at the PDP National Secretariat in Abuja.

Okowa was criticized by the Southern and Middle Belt Leaders’ Forum (SMBLF) for agreeing to be Atiku's running mate which was seen as a breach of the May 11, 2021 joint decision of Southern state governors hosted by Okowa himself in Asaba. In that meeting, it was agreed that on the principles of fairness, equity and justice, the presidency should rotate to the south at the end of the statutory eight years of President Muhammadu Buhari’s tenure.

Atiku and Okowa ranked second in the presidential bid canvasing a total of 6,984,520 votes (29.07%).

== Corruption allegations ==
=== Delta Line privatization ===
In Okowa's first term, his administration announced the partial privatization of the state-owned Delta Line bus company. At the end of the privatization process, 60% of Delta Line was bought by God is Good Transport Development Company (GTDC) for ₦160 million while 40% remained under the ownership of the Delta State government. Immediately, calls of fraud were raised as the owner of GTDC, Chidi Ajaere, had supported Okowa's 2015 campaign and fellow bidder, the Delta State Council of the Amalgamated Union of Public Corporation, Civil Service Technical and Recreational Services Employees, claimed that they had offered ₦2 billion for the same stake. The AUPCTRE and its organization, the Nigeria Labour Congress, claimed that GTDC initially offered the concession committee only ₦80 million compared to their ₦2 billion, yet GTDC was chosen when they doubled their offer to ₦160 million paid in two parts while the AUPCTRE was never called back by the committee; AUPCTRE also claimed that GTDC never completed their second payment of ₦80 million. Okowa's commissioners attempted to defend the sale by claiming that Delta Line was in debt, however, former Delta Line Accountant-General David Akpemegin claimed that the company had nearly finished its debt payments at the time of the sale and financial records show that the Line was profitable according to AUPCTRE, who opposed the privatization. Reports also stated that Okowa appointees such as Commissioner of Finance and Chair of the Concession Committee David Edevbie actively supported GTDC throughout the process despite their low bid. Further, experts claimed that GTDC's acquisition was in part to get rid of a competitor and reports showed a drop in quality of Delta Line services after the sale. Okowa's Chief Press Secretary Olisa Ifeajika defended the administration's sale as merit-based and citing GTDC's "vast experience in transportation sector." GTDC also defended itself by saying that Ajaere had no "special relationship" with Okowa and that the company was the most qualified bidder.

=== 2019 Auditor-General report ===
In December 2021, a two part investigation by the International Centre for Investigative Reporting found irregular expenditures, disregard for financial regulations, and evidence of financial misappropriation in the Delta State Auditor-General's annual report for 2019. Several ministries, departments and agencies (MDAs) along with the State House of Assembly were implicated for irregularities in the investigation of the report. Some notable findings include: Office of the Secretary to State Government's inability to account for ₦278.5 million in public funds, members of the Okowa administration illegally ignoring Freedom of Information requests, State Board of Internal Revenue's questionable use of ₦107.74 million in funds and the extra-budgetary expenditures of the ministries of Health and Agriculture along with inflated costs for House of Assembly members' vehicles. Officials mainly ignored requests for comment or referred the matter to Auditor-General Paul Aghanenu, who stood by the report but stated that he could not answer further questions without the approval of the Secretary to State Government.

=== Alleged diversion of derivation fund ===
In November 2024, Okowa was invited by Port Harcourt office of the Economic and Financial Crimes Commission (EFCC) for questioning over alleged mismanagement and diversion of 13% derivation meant for Delta State between 2015 and 2023, amounting to N1.3trillion. He was detained by the anti-graft agency.

== Award and honour ==
1. He was honoured as Man of the year 2017 by the Independent Newspaper at Eko Hotel and Suites in Lagos. The award was presented by Alhaji Ismalis Isa Funtu.
2. In 2017, he achieved the highest award of the University of Ibadan, Ibadan-Nigeria as the Alumni of the year 2016, where he successfully delivered a lecture titled "Good Governance for Wealth Creation and Sustainable Development: Experience and Lessons" at the 2017 edition of University of Ibadan Alumni lecture organised by the University of Ibadan Alumni Association (UIAA)
3. In October 2022, a Nigerian national honour of Commander of the Order of the Niger (CON) was conferred on him by President Muhammadu Buhari.

== See also ==
- Delta State People's Democratic Party
- List of governors of Delta State

Senate of Nigeria
Preceded by Patrick Osakwe	Senator for Delta North; 2011–2015	Succeeded by Peter Nwaoboshi
Party political offices
Preceded by Emmanuel Uduaghan	PDP nominee for Governor of Delta State; 2015, 2019	Succeeded by Sheriff Oborevwori
Preceded by Peter Obi	PDP nominee for Vice President of Nigeria; 2023	Most recent
Political offices
Preceded by Emmanuel Uduaghan	Governor of Delta State; 2015–2023	Succeeded by Sheriff Oborevwori
