= Burutu =

- Town and LGA
- Interactive map of Burutu
- Location within Nigeria
- Coordinates: 5°21′N 5°31′E
- Country: Nigeria
- State: Delta State

Population (2006)
  - Total: 207,977
- Time zone: UTC+1 (WAT)
- Website: https://burutulga.dl.gov.ng/

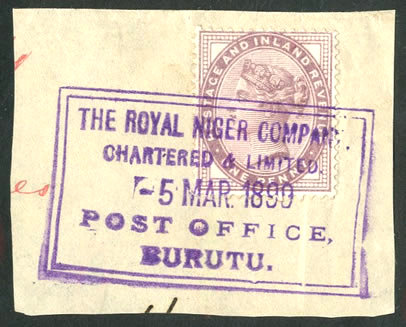
British stamps used at the Royal Niger Company base at Burutu in the 1890s.

Burutu is a town and Local Government Area in Delta State, Nigeria. It lies on the coast of the Niger Delta on two sides of the Forcados River, a channel of the River Niger, 30 kilometres (20 miles) upstream from the Bight of Benin. It has served as a link between river transport and the sea when the Royal Niger Company established a base there in the late 19th century. People living in this region are mostly of the Izon ethnicity. As at the 2006 census, Burutu has a total population of 207,977 people.

== Burutu towns and villages ==
Burutu Local Governments comprises the following towns and villages:

1. Burutu-Forcados: Burutu, Forcados, Keremo2
2. Iduwun: include the following neighbourhoods; Ofougbene, Odimodi, Osamayigben
3. Ogulagha: include the following neighbourhoods; Benibayo, Ogulagha, Yobebe, Yokrisobo
4. Obatebe: include the following neighbourhoods; Abadima, Okorogbene, Kalagfionene, Kenlogbene, Obotebe, Opuapale
5. Ngbilebiri/Main: include the following neighbourhoods; Agbodobiri, Akparegmobini, Amasuomo, Biokorgha, Egodor, Egologbene, Gbekebor, Kiagbo, New Town, Ngbilebiri, Ogbeingbene, Ogbolugbiri, Okrika, Yayogbene, Zion-Oyagbene.
6. Operemor: include the following neighbourhoods; Abadiama, Bolu-Ojobo, Bolou Ndoro, Egrangbene, Ekogbene, Ekumugbene, Ojobo, Rougbene.
7. Seimibiri: has the following localities; Dunu-Ogusu, Edegbene, Nikorogha, Oboro, Ogbene, Okpokunon, Okuamo
8. Toumo: Bolua-Tamigbe, Botu-Mangbebe, Bolu-Tebegbe, Douebido-zion, Founkoro-Gbene, Isreallo-zion, Ogbogbabene, Toru-Temigbe, Torugbene, Toubo Town.

=== Economic activities ===
In the first half of the twentieth century the town expanded as a result of activities of the Niger Company and later UAC which acquired the trading interest of the Niger Company and its assets at Burutu. Prior to the beginning of the twentieth century, the main port of the Niger Company was at Akassa but when the water channel that opens to the sea became silted, the company moved operations Westward to Burutu close to Forcados. Burutu then served as a port terminal for Niger Company and UAC, discharging goods from ships for onward water transport to river ports in Northern Nigeria and French territories through rivers Niger and Benue.

The port of Burutu was owned by UAC but was later acquired by Nigeria Port Authority.

The Burutu Shipyard with 3 slipways built in the 1850s is now (2025) being revived by the local community chief with a group of investors involving the local marine polytechnic and commuters. This would give the entire Focados and Warri region an economical boost and would enhance local shiprepair and employment.The yard will be capable to handle ships up to 100 metres (330 feet) for now and will be expanded in the next phases with additional docking places up to 200 metres (660 feet). The shipyard is easy accessible over water with a 30-40 minutes boat ride from Warri port and from open sea and other local communities around the Focados waters.

== Climate ==
Rarely does the region's year-round temperature fall below 64 °F or rise over 89 °F, with the warm and partly cloudy rainy season.
