= Patani, Nigeria =

- LGA and town
- Interactive map of Patani, Nigeria
- Coordinates: 5.23072°N 6.18885°E
- Country: Nigeria
- State: Delta State
- Headquarters: Patani Town

Area
  - Total: 217 km^{2} (84 sq mi)

Population (2006)
  - Total: 67,391
  - Density: 311/km^{2} (804/sq mi)
- Time zone: UTC+1 (WAT)
- Postal code: 333

Patani is a town and Local Government Area of Delta State, Nigeria.

It has an area of 217 km^{2} and a population of 67,391 at the 2006 census.

The postal code of the area is 333.

== Climate ==
With annual temperatures that are lower than normal for Nigeria and a high rate of rainfall (82.52%), Patani typically has a tropical monsoon climate.
