= Bomadi =

- LGA and town
- Interactive map of Bomadi
- Location within Nigeria
- Country: Nigeria
- State: Delta State
- Headquarters: Bomadi Town

Population (2006)
  - Total: 86,016
- Time zone: UTC+1 (WAT)

Bomadi is an Ijaw town and local government area in Delta State, Nigeria. The town lies on the bank of the Forcados River. This LGA also has its headquarters located in Bomadi town.

It has eleven communities, namely: Ogriagbene, Esanma, Akugbene, Ogbein-ama, Bomadi, Kpakiama, Ekamuta-gbene, Azebiri, Ogodobiri, Okoloba and Kalafuo-gbene, Adobu, Agoloma, Aven, Bolou Apelebiri, Bolou-Angiama, Odorubu, Ogo-Eze As at the 2006 census, this LGA has a total population of 86,016 people.

== Climate ==
In the town Bomadi, the dry season is always very hot and cloudy but during the wet season, it's always warm. The temperature is always within 21 °C (70 °F) to 30 °C (86 °F).
