= Warri South West =

- LGA
- Interactive map of Warri South West
- Location within Nigeria
- Country: Nigeria
- State: Delta State
- Established: 1996
- Headquarters: Ogbe-Ijoh

Government
  - Type: LGA
  - Local Government Chairman: Chief Hon. Sylvester Oromoni

Area
  - Land: 1,279 km^{2} (494 sq mi)
  - Density: 125.5/km^{2} (325/sq mi)
- Time zone: UTC+1 (WAT)
- Postal code: 332

Warri South West is a Local Government Area in Delta State, Nigeria. It was created in 1996 and has its headquarters in Ogbe-Ijoh, an Ijaw community.

== Warri South-West Local Government ==
Warri South West has an estimated land area of 1,722 km^{2} (665 sq mi) and a population of 116,538 from the census of 2006 but this population has grown since then.

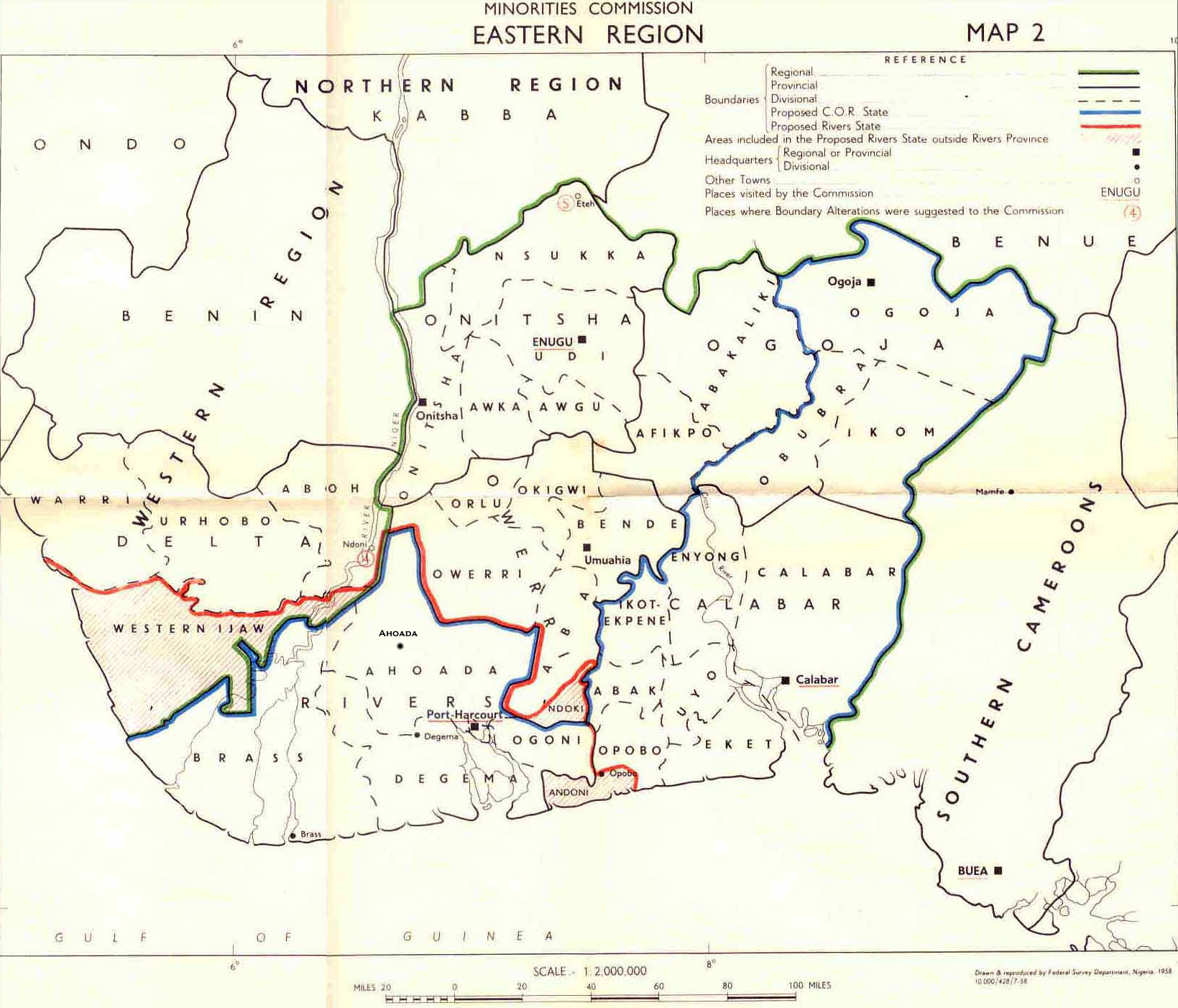
The British Map of Eastern Nigeria, 1958

The local government majorly constitutes the Itsekiri people.

Politically, the Itsekiris currently have six wards (Aja-udaibo, Akpikpa, Madangho, Ogidigben, Orere and Ugborodo) while the Ijaws have four wards (Gbaramatu, Isaba, Ogbe-Ijoh and Oporoza). A political structure that doesn't reflect the true geographical reality.

This LGA boasts of some of the largest proven oil and gas reserves in Delta State and the Niger Delta.

Operation has commenced in the phase one the Escravos Gas to Liquid project, and in March 2015 another $16 billion gas project was commissioned. In addition, the Nigeria Maritime University is located in Okerenkoko with a take-off campus at Kurutie.

In the presence of the wealth of natural resource, the LGA has suffered huge impact of resource extraction and communal disputes but in the past years it has emerged a state place for business and development.

Warri South West is where the Escravos Gas to Liquid (EGTL) multibillion-dollar project is located. The EGTL project is owned and financed by Chevron and the Nigeria National Petroleum Corporation Limited (NNPCL). The technology and most equipment used to convert the gas to liquid at EGTL is from South Africa. The postal code of the area is 332.

== Governance ==
Warri South-West local government is governed as a Local Government Area in Nigeria. There is a chairman, vice chairman, secretary to the Local Government and the local councillors. The current Warri South-West Local Government Chairman is Chief Sylvester Oromoni.

== See also ==
- Warri
