= Ika South =

- LGA
- Interactive map of Ika South
- Location within Nigeria
- Country: Nigeria
- State: Delta State
- Headquarters: Agbor

Population (2006)
  - Total: 167,060
- Time zone: UTC+1 (WAT)

Ika South is a Local Government Area of Delta State, Nigeria. Headquarter is in the town of Agbor. This LGA has a population of 167,060 as at the 2006 census. It's one of the local government that makes up Ika ethnic nationality

== Cities, towns, and communities ==
1. Abavo-Central (Ogbe-Obi)
2. Agbor-Obi
3. Agbor-Alidima
4. Agbor [Town] Orogodo
5. Agbor-Nta
6. Aliagwa
7. Alifekede
8. Alizormo
9. Alihagwu
10. Alihame
11. Aliokpu
12. Alisimie
13. Alisor
14. Emuhu
15. Ewuru
16. Oki
17. Omumu
18. Ekuku-Agbor
19. Oza-Nogogo
20. Idumuoza
21. Ekwuoma
22. Ekwueze
23. Okpe
24. Oyoko
25. Obi-Anyinma
26. Oriokan-Aliodu
27. Alidogwu
28. Ogbe-Isogban
29. Ogbe-Idibon
30. Ogbehulor
31. Idumu-Ugbo
32. Ekuma
33. Imiele
34. Alizomor
35. Aliohen

== Notable people ==
- Jim Ovia Founder of Zenith Bank Nigeria PLC
