= Oshimili North =

- LGA
- Oshimili North
- Interactive map of Oshimili North
- Coordinates: 6.38265°N 6.62431°E
- Country: Nigeria
- State: Delta State
- Headquarters: Akwukwu-Igbo

Population (2006)
  - Total: 118,540
- Time zone: UTC+1 (WAT)
- Postal code: 320
- National language: Enuani

The Oshimili North is one of the twenty-five Local Government Areas that make up Delta State, South-south geo-political region of Nigeria. The Local Government was created in 1997 and until its creation, was part of the old Oshimili Local Government Area. The Local Government is headquartered at Akwukwu-Igbo. Oshimili North is represented by Hon. Pat Ajudua in the Delta State House of Assembly. This LGA has a total population of 118,540 as at the 2006 census.
