= Ughelli North =

- LGA
- Interactive map of Ughelli North
- Coordinates: 5°30′N 6°02′E
- Country: Nigeria
- State: Delta State
- Headquarters: Ughelli

Area
  - Total: 818 km^{2} (316 sq mi)

Population (2006)
  - Total: 320,687
  - Density: 392/km^{2} (1,020/sq mi)
- Time zone: UTC+1 (WAT)
- Postal code: 333

Ughelli North is a Local Government Area of Delta State, Nigeria. Its headquarters is in the city of Ughelli.

It has an area of 818 km^{2} and a population of 320,687 at the 2006 census. Projected to be 780,022 (in 2022).

The postal code of the area is 333.

== Notable towns in Ughelli North ==
1. Ughelli
2. Orogun
3. Agbarho
4. Agbarha
5. Ufuoma
6. Oteri
7. Evwreni
8. Uduere
9. Afiesere
10. Eboh-Orogun
11. Ugono-Orogun
12. Aragba-Orogun
