= Sheriff Oborevwori =

Nigerian politician, Philanthropist (born 1963)

His Excellency Sheriff Francis Oborevwori CON

Governor of Delta State
- Incumbent
- Assumed office 29 May 2023
- Deputy: Monday Onyeme
- Preceded by: Ifeanyi Okowa

Speaker of Delta House of Assembly
- In office June 2017 – 29 May 2023
- Preceded by: Rt. Hon. Monday Igbuya
- Succeeded by: Emomotimi Guwor

Personal details
- Born: 19 June 1963 (age 63) Osubi Town, Okpe Kingdom/Local Government Area, Delta State
- Party: All Progressives Congress
- Spouse: Mrs Tobore Oborevwori
- Parent(s): Chief Samuel Oborevwori, Mrs Samuel Oborevwori

Sheriff Francis Orohwedor Oborevwori (born 19 June 1963) is a Nigerian politician who has served as the governor of Delta State since 2023. He previously served as speaker of the Delta State House of Assembly, representing the Okpe Constituency of Delta State under the Peoples Democratic Party (PDP) from 2017 to 2023.

== Early life and education ==
Oborevwori was born on 19 June 1963 to the family of Chief Samuel and Mrs. Esther Oborevwori of Osubi town in Okpe Local Government Area of Delta State. He began his education at Alegbo Primary School and completed his secondary education at Oghareki Grammar School, Oghareki. He earned a bachelor's degree in political science from Ambrose Ali University, Ekpoma, in 2004 and later obtained a master's degree in political science from Delta State University, Abraka, in 2010. Oborevwori is an alumnus of the Alliance Manchester Business School of Manchester University, where he completed a Leadership Executive Certificate Programme and the London School of Economics and Political Science, where he received a certificate in a programme on Leading Inclusive Development.

== Political career ==
Oborevwori began his political career as a grassroots politician and served as the chairman of the Okpe Community. However, he came into the limelight in 2015 when he was elected as the representative of the Okpe State Constituency in the Delta State House of Assembly under the PDP. This followed 19 years of public service, which began with his role as a councillor in 1996. He was elected speaker of the Delta State House of Assembly on 11 May 2017 following the impeachment of the then speaker, Rt. Hon. Monday Igbuya. He was re-elected in 2019 as the speaker for a second term, following his victory at the polls to represent the Okpe State Constituency at the Delta State House of Assembly.

He was declared the governor-elect of Delta State on 20 March 2023 after winning the gubernatorial elections held on 18 March 2023 but defected to the ruling All Progressive Congress (APC) in April 2025. including his predecessor, Ifeanyi Okowa, and all members of the PDP in Delta.

On 12 October 2025, the APC in the state adopted him and President Bola Tinubu as the party's sole candidates for the 2027 general elections.

== Professional affiliations, awards and special recognition ==
Oborevwori is a member of several professional bodies, including the Nigerian Institute of Management (Chartered). He is also a chartered management consultant of the Chartered Institute of Management Consultants, Canada and a fellow of the Institute Chartered Mediators and Conciliators (FICMC). On 14 May 2018, he was honoured by the National Association of Nigerian Students (NANS) with a Legislative Icon Award in recognition of his educational initiatives and scholarship programmes benefiting students across Delta State. He was also conferred with the chieftaincy title of Ukodo of Okpe by Orhorho I, the Orodje of Okpe, in recognition of his contributions to the growth and development of the Okpe Kingdom.

== Philanthropic activities ==
In 2018, Oborevwori provided scholarships to 25 indigene and non-indigene students in Okpe Local Government for the 2018/2019 academic session. He also launched other empowerment initiatives through the Oborevwori Foundation Scholarship Scheme. These efforts included distributing entrepreneurship and support items worth six million naira. Donations included 24 buses/cars, 10 tricycles, 20 hairdressing salon kits (including generators), 40 grinding machines, 30 sewing machines, 20 deep freezers for market women in the frozen food business, and clothing for hundreds of widows.

== Personal life ==
Oborevwori is married to Mrs. Tobore Oborevwori. In May 2011, she was reportedly abducted by gunmen along Osubi road in Okpe Local Government Area of Delta State. The culprits were later arrested and sentenced to 21 years in prison.

== See also ==
- List of governors of Delta State
