= Ndokwa West =

- LGA
- Interactive map of Ndokwa West
- Country: Nigeria
- State: Delta State
- Headquarters: Kwale

Area
  - Total: 268 km^{2} (103 sq mi)

Population (2022)
  - Total: 205,600
  - Density: 767/km^{2} (1,990/sq mi)
- Time zone: UTC+1 (WAT)
- Postal code: 322

Ndokwa West is a Local Government Area of Delta State, Nigeria. Its headquarters are in the town of Kwale (Utagba-Ogbe).

It has an area of 816 km^{2} and a population of 150,024 at the 2006 census.Notable communities in Ndokwa West include: Utagbe Ogbe, Emu, Ogume, Abbi, Utagbe Uno, Onicha-Ukwuani, Oliogo, and Ijeze.

The postal code of the area is 322.

== Notable people ==
- Enebeli Elebuwa, late Nigerian actor
