= Agbon Kingdom =

Urhobo ethnic group

- Location in Nigeria
- Coordinates: 5°55′N 5°45′E
- Country: Nigeria
- State: Delta State

Government
  - Type: Monarchy
  - Ovie (King): HRM Ogurime-Rime Ukori I

The Agbon Kingdom (also Agbon ẹkwuotọ ) is one of twenty-four subunits of the Urhobo people that have been in existence since before the rise of the Ogodomigodo Empire that includes the Urhobo and the Edo era that was taken over by new leadership of Benin Empire in the 1440s and before the arrival of the Portuguese in the Western Niger Delta in the 1480s.

It is located in Ethiope East Local Government Area In Delta State, Nigeria. Which occupies a large space of about 375 square kilometres. This kingdom is surrounded by other Urhobo communities in the locality.

The traditional seat of government in this kingdom is located at Isiokolo.

== History ==
Oral tradition speaks of migrations from the ancient Benin Kingdom by the Urhobos that gave rise to this area.

The founders of Agbon migrated through Kwale, probably from Erhowa, settled at Ehwen and Erhivwi or Irri in present Isoko division of Delta State. From there they moved down to Utokori, close to Ughwerun; then to Olomu and through the present Ughelli territory of Ekuigbo to found Otorho r' Agbon now known as Isiokolo.

Isiokolo is now the recognised ancestral place of leadership by the members of this kingdom.

== Location ==
Agbon Kingdom covers about 375 square kilometres. The land is bounded in the north by Abraka kingdom, and Orhionmwon Local Government Area in neighbouring Edo State, On the east, it is bounded by Orogun, Agbahra Otor, Agbarho Kingdoms, Ujode River, and Ekrerhavwe, all of them Urhobo communities in Ughelli North Local Government Area. In Agbon's west and south lies Aghalokpe and Orerokpe of Okpe Local Government Area.

== Leadership ==
His Royal Majesty, Ogurime-Rime Ukori I is the current King and Ovie of Agbon Kingdom. He was crowned Ovie in February 2013 succeeding the late Ogurime-Rime Okpara I

== Natural resources ==
This kingdom produces a variety of food crops, mostly yam, plantain and cassava. Cash crops as palm produce and rubber plantations also flourish here. Agbon holds a large reservoir of crude oil which is a major source of income to Nigeria; the Erhorike oil wells are considered to be among the shallowest in the world and are found here.

== Population ==
The kingdom is highly populated as it has an extensive range of towns and villages under its territorial domain. It has been ranked the second most populous cultural unit in Urhobo land, coming only after Okpe. The population of this kingdom alone amounts for more than 40% of the Delta state population.

== Language ==
The people of Agbon speak Urhobo as their mother tongue with little or no dialectical forms. The Nigerian pidgin is also widespread in this kingdom as well as English, the lingua franca of Nigeria.

== Composition ==
This kingdom is made up of a wide array of sub-kingdoms and villages or towns. These sub-kingdoms are the consequences of migrations from one terrain to another.

=== Sub-kingdoms ===
- Okpara (first son)
- Kokori (second son)
- Orhoakpor (third son)
- Eku (Fourth Son)
- Ovu (descendant of Okpara)
- Igun

=== Towns and villages ===
Some Of The Towns In Agbon Kingdom;

- Isiokolo
- Ekrebuo
- Kokori
- Erhomeghwu
- Okuidjerhe
- Samagidi
- Egbogho
- Urhwokpe
- Ekraka
- Erhonaka
- Erhorike
- Okpara Inland
- Okurutuyo
- Okuekpagha
- Unumane
- Okoradaode
- Okurufor
- Okururhujevwe
- Umiaghwa
- Okurihohi
- Okuibada
- Erhokori
- Orhoakpor
- Ekrudu
- Okukpokpo
- Okureghwro
- Eku
- Igun
- Otumara
- Okpara W/S
- Okorogba
- Okurekpo
- Okuredafe
- Oviorie
- Ovu Inland
- Okuemeka
- Okurekpagha
- Okuogbamu
- Ovwere
- Urhodo
- Okumodje
- Obadjere
- Ekpan
- Igwevwore
- Okwokpokpo
- Ekusioro
- Okurobi
- Okuronika
- Okuighele
- Ekirugbo.
- okuomoise
