= M. G. Ejaife =

Nigerian politician

McNeil Gabriel Ejaife

Senator of Western Region
- In office 1960–1964

Personal details
- Born: McNeil Gabriel Ejaife; June 1, 1912 Okpara Inland, Ethiope East LGA, Delta State, Nigeria
- Died: 6 March 1972 (age 59)

Mc Neil Gabriel (M.G.) Ejaife (1 June 1912 – 6 March 1972) was an Urhobo nationalist from Okpara Inland and the first principal of the Urhobo College, Effurun, Uvwie. He was one of two recipients of scholarship awards from Urhobo Progress Union during World War II years. In 1948, Ejaife became the first Urhobo graduate of Durham University. He later became Urhobo's first Senator, serving in Nigeria's Upper Chamber during the country's First Republic.

== Early life ==
McNeil Gabriel Ejaife was born on 1 June 1912 at Okurekpo in Agon, an Urhobo Clan in Delta State of Nigeria, to Utujoh Ejaife, of Okpara, and Temienor Akpowhowho, of Eku. He had an older sister and two brothers, namely Frederick Obodeti Ejaife, a lawyer, and Johnson Jakovo Ejaife, a medical doctor.

Okpara was mainly a farming community when Ejaife was young.

== Education ==
He attended Anglican school at Okpara and then went to St Andrew's teacher training college in Oyo, Oyo State. Following graduation in the early 1930s, he moved to Warri, where he taught at the CMS elementary until the late 1930s.

He later moved to Ibuzor in Delta State and taught at St Thomas' teacher training college, returning to Warri in 1943. During this period, he obtained his London Matriculation, as it was then called. His achievements in the education sector began to be recognised the Urhobo People, particularly Chief Mukoro Mowoe, who at the time was planning to set up a secondary school, and Ejaife was awarded a scholarship to study abroad.

In 1944, leaving behind his wife and children, he enrolled at Fourah Bay College in Sierra Leone, achieving a Bachelor of Arts degree after eighteen months. He went on to study at Durham University, becoming its first Urhobo graduate in 1948, and receiving a formal reception with local chiefs and dignitaries on his return home.

== Career and association with Urhobo College ==
Chief Mukoro Mowoe's plans came to fruition, and Ejaife was appointed founding principal of Urhobo's first secondary school. The school was initially called Urhobo Collegiate School, but later changed to its current name, Urhobo College. The school was first located on Warri-Sapele Road, with around two dozen students enrolled. Ejaife chose the school's motto, “AUT OPTIMUM AUT NIHIL” ('the best or nothing'). A.I. Igho, Durham University's second Urhobo graduate, became vice-principal in 1951, but died a few years later. The current campus at Effurun was opened in 1950, with student numbers growing, and Ejaife remained principal until 1966, the year of the first Nigerian military coup. By this time, time he was also a member of the Nigerian Senate, having been appointed at the time of Nigerian independence in 1960. Ejaife taught several subjects, at both elementary and secondary level, including English and Latin.

== Professional accolades ==
Ejaife served on the Scholarship Board of the old Western Region of Nigeria. He was also a member of the Cooperative Development Board of that region, and influenced Demas Akpore, the current Ovie of Agbon - indeed, Ejaife was involved in restoring the traditional 'Ovie' titleship in 1952, allowing titleholders to participate in the former Western Region's House of Chiefs. A devout Catholic, Ejaife was appointed a Knight of the Blessed Mulumba.

== Personal life ==
While teaching in Warri, Ejaife met his wife, Cecilia Fischer. They married in 1938 and had three sons.

== Death ==
Ejaife went into hiding during the military coup of 1966, and later fled to Ughelli, his Senate position having become defunct due to that institution's abolition after the coup. In 1969, working as Deputy Director of Education in Ughelli, he suffered a career-ending stroke. After spending a period of time recuperating with his son in Ibadan, he was resettled in his own residence in 1971. He died at home in March 1972, aged 59. He was survived by his wife, Chief Cecilia Gladys Ejaife (d. 2002), his three sons, and four grandchildren. He was buried in his hometown of Okpara.
