= Demas Akpore =

Nigerian politician and academic

- Born: 4 August 1928
- Died: 28 December 1993 (aged 65)
- Education: University of British Columbia; University of College Ibadan; Ahmadu Bello University Zaria
- Occupation: Teacher

Chief Demas Onoliobakpovba Akpore (4 August 1928 – 28 December 1993) was a Nigerian educator and politician who served as the first elected deputy governor of Bendel State from 1979 to 1983. He was also the principal of Government College, Ughelli, and the founder and principal of Orogun Grammar School.

== Early life and education ==
Akpore was born on 4 August 1928, in Warri, Nigeria, to a Christian family. His father, Itedjere Akpore, was from Unukpo, Orogun and his mother Etawhota Akpore (née Agbomiyeri) was from Kokori, both in present-day Delta State. He was the only child of his mother and the eldest of his father’s eight children.

Following the death of his mother, a young Akpore was taken in and raised by a woman named Inaba Uyokpeyi.

He started his formal education at St. Andrew's Church Missionary Society School in Warri, and was a student there from 1937 to 1944. Upon graduation he proceeded to Government College, Ughelli.

After completing his secondary school education in 1951, he attended University College, Ibadan from 1951 to 1956, where he obtained a bachelor of arts degree in classics. He subsequently attended the University of British Columbia in Vancouver, Canada, from 1956 to 1958, earning his master’s degree in classics.

For his Postgraduate Diploma in Education (PGDE), he later attended the Ahmadu Bello University, Zaria, from 1974 to 1975.

== Working career ==
While a student at the University College, Ibadan, Akpore spent his long vacations teaching Latin at Urhobo College, Effurun.

After returning from the University of British Columbia, he began teaching at the United College of Commerce, Warri. Between 1959 and 1962, he served as the vice principal, before being promoted to the position of principal in 1962. Akpore held this role until 1966, overseeing the school's operations during a significant period of growth and development.

The same year, he left and established Orogun Grammar School, Orogun, in his home town. He served as the proprietor and principal of the school until 1973.

When the government of Bendel State took over privately owned schools, Akpore was appointed principal of Government College, Ughelli, his alma mater. He served in this role from 1973 to 1978.

He refused to take compensation from the government for his school affirming that he established it for his people and would therefore not make profit out of it.

In 1988, when government had lifted the ban on private ownership of schools, he again established Idise Institute, Warri.

Akpore was a council member of the College of Education, Abraka, from 1973 to 1978.

== Political career ==
During his university days at Ibadan, Akpore developed an interest in politics and became an active unionist and student leader. He later joined the National Council of Nigeria and the Cameroons (NCNC) and quickly rose through the ranks to become the leader of the party's youth wing.

He was a member of the Zikist National Party Vanguard and the Midwest Democratic Front in 1963.

Akpore collaborated closely with Chief Dennis Osadebay to advocate for the establishment of the Midwest Region, an effort that succeeded in 1963. He then redirected his enthusiasm to championing the creation of Delta State. His goal was achieved, though he was hospitalised in the United States at the time.

When the ban on political activities was lifted in 1978, he joined the Unity Party of Nigeria (UPN) becoming an executive member of the state branch of the party. He was the running mate of his party's gubernatorial candidate Ambrose Folorunsho Alli in 1979. They won the election and were elected the first governor and deputy governor, respectively, of what was then the Bendel State and were sworn on 1 October 1979. He, however resigned as deputy governor on 3 November 1982 over irreconcilable differences. About a month later, he was attacked by unknown assailants in a failed assassination attempt.

== Personal life and death ==
Akpore and his wife Grace had seven children: Stella, Jomo, Boye, Ejime, Kevwe, Enaite and Newman. A pan-Africanist, Akpore named his first son after the Kenyan pan-Africanist leader Jomo Kenyatta.

Akpore’s son Boye was also a politician. Boye was assassinated on 17 March 2001 in Okuokoko, Okpe, Delta State.

Akpore died on 28 December 1993. After his death, Orugun Grammar School was renamed after Akpore.

His wife Grace later immigrated to America. She died on August 29, 2024 in Galesburg, Illinois.

== Sources ==
- Ahon, Festus Nigeria: "Immortalize Akpore, Activist Urges Delta Government" (Vanguard (Nigeria) 30 December 2008)
- Akpore, Demas O. "The Question of the Falling Standard of Education: A Policy in Transition, The Nigerian Experience from An Educator's Viewpoint". (A lecture delivered on the occasion of the 1981 University of Ibadan Alumni Association Annual Lectures held at the University of Ibadan, Ibadan, 20 March 1981.
- Akpoyibo, Marvel- Lagos State Police Commissioner "I never had a girlfriend in school because I was married to my books" (The Punch-Nigeria-By Friday Olokor; Published 20 December 2009)
- Awhefeada, Sunny. "Remembering Demas Akpore" (National Daily, Nigeria- 27 December 2008)
- Darra, G.G. "Urhobo and the Mowoe Legacy"(The Guardian, Nigeria-10 August 2005) Professor of English, Delta State University, Abraka/Special Adviser on Public Communications to the Governor of Delta State
- Eromosele, Victor "Government College Ughelli at 60"(The Guardian, Nigeria 9 November 2005)
- Olodu, Monn "Much Ado About Delta State Capital"
- Omu, Stella "Demas Akpore" Administrator, Nigeria federal Ministry of Education.
