= Thompson Salubi =

Thompson Adogbeji Salubi, also known as T.E.A. Salubi (1906 – 1982), was a Nigerian diarist, historian and politician who was president of the Urhobo Progress Union for twenty years. Salubi wrote manuscripts on the history of the Western Niger Delta and is an important reference on the history of Urhobo people during the beginning of the colonial period. Some of his writings were edited by Peter Ekeh and published as the book T.E.A. Salubi: Witness to British Colonial Rule in Urhoboland and Nigeria by the Urhobo Historical Society in 2008.

== Early life ==
Salubi was born in Western Urhobo land. His father was from Ovu in present day Ethiope East local government area of Delta State. Between 1917 and 1924, he attended schools in Ovu and Lagos; after finishing standard six in Lagos, he took a 14 day return journey back to Ovu through the delta creeks. His first work was teaching at Okpara waterside. On the side, he also did translation for a Yoruba preacher. He went back to Lagos and spent two years at Lagos Baptist Academy. Thereafter, Salubi joined the colonial civil service in 1927, beginning as a trainee in the sanitary department of the Lagos Town Council.

== Career ==
In 1930, he completed certification with the Royal Sanitary Institute and later became the director of the sanitary inspector's office at Ebute Metta, one of the few African inspectors at the time who coordinated their own branches. In 1943, he transferred services to the Labour department where he spent his remaining civil service years before retiring as a deputy commissioner for Labour.

In 1963, Salubi was president of the Urhobo Progress Union, an association to protect the interest and support educational advancement of Urhobos. During the First Nigerian Republic, Salubi belonged to a few political groups. He was affiliated with NCNC but later co-founded the Midwest Democratic Front. Between 1964 and 1972, he served as a regional commissioner in various administrations and ministries. After the Midwest region was carved out of the West, Salubi was appointed regional Minister of Works. During the administration of Samuel Ogbemudia, he was a commissioner of agriculture.

== Honours ==
Chief T. E. A. Salubi was awarded the honorary degree of Doctor of Letters of the University of Ibadan. The University also awards the Chief T. E. A. Salubi Endowment Prize in Nigerian History.
