= Okpara Inland =

Community in Ethiope East local government

Okpara Inland is a community located in the Ethiope East Local Government Area of Delta State Nigeria. This community is a descendent of the Agbon Kingdom. Local history has it that it is the first son of Agbon whose traditional seat of leadership is Isiokolo. The previous king of the community, now deceased, HRM Chamberlain Oyibocha Orovwuje, Ogurimerime Okpara I, used this community as his centre of leadership bypassing the ancient satellite of Isiokolo.

== Origins/Background ==
The traditions of the origins and migrations of Okpara as one of the Urhobo groups is still shrouded in obscurity and uncertainty. However, Okpara claim descent from one progenitor called Agbon who is said to have migrated from Benin at a point in time to settle in Agbon town. Predicated upon this belief of common descent from Agbon, is the worship of Isiokoru fetish by Agbon people, even till today. When Agbon people finally got to Isiokolo, they made contact with Benin to make an earth fetish for them. The Oba sent a messenger to Agbon town, which convened a meeting of all Agbon children. The messenger buried the head of an Orhokpor boy in a place. On that spot, he planted an Iroko and Oghriki tree. He then proclaimed that from then on Agbon would be subject to the Oba. He gave a horse tail symbolizing authority to the eldest man called Okarorho. Automatically all the children of Agbon regarded this fetish as their god of war. They worshipped it from time to time. Moreover, the common traditions of origins and migrations shared by Okpara people is fundamental in explaining their relations in the pre-colonial era. This, for instance, had served as a unifying factor among them. In any critical moment of decision between them, they often evoke the memory of their common origins by the saying -we are all one-.

Agbon people have a long migrational history, their various traditions and accounts of origins and migrations subsist. According to one of the accounts, a man called Ukonorhoro, who migrated from Udo in Benin, gave birth to Agbon. Agbon migrated through Kwale, probably from Erhowa, settled at Ehwen and Erhivwi or Irri in present Isoko division of Delta State. From there he moved down to Utokori, close to Ughwerun; then to Olomu and through the present Ughelli territory of Ekuigbo to found Otorho r' Agbon now known as Isiokolo. The Okpara people further migrated from Agbon to their present position due to local instinct and avoidance of competition. On arrival on this new land via migration, Okpara also birthed few sons which would become sub-sections of the present community. They include: Eregbe, Erhi, and Etorogba. Erhi, in turn, gave birth to Osia, Isaba Uvwiaghoa, Onoriaro and Okei among others. Okpara was already dead at the time of migration from Isiokolo. Thus Osia and others led Okparas to a new settlement. Osia planted an Oghriki tree near the present site of Okpara hospital on reaching Okpara. The essence of this was to allow their people to make love, for the presence of the tree symbolizes that, that place was a settlement. It was a taboo among them, for people to make love in the bush. One of Osia's descendants must be the chief priest of the Oto Shrine because it was Osia who planted the Oghriki tree. As the population grew, both due to the birth of new immigrants like Esume, the people of Okpara began to spread out. Esume who was Osia's in-law founded Osia street, but because he was an in-law, the street was named after Osia. Omovwiona founded Urhu-iniovwona, one of Isaba's children founded Urhu-Egbo; Ogene founded Urhu-Ogene, Ononaro founded Imodje street; the descendants of Eregbe founded Eregbe quarter, and Ete-ogba children founded Ogba quarter. Some Okpara people also moved away to found new settlements like Ovu, Okpara water-side, Okurekpo, Otumara Ogba village, Obi village, Adarode, Okurofo, Aghwariore, Ugbegbe, Ugbuwherhe, Okarunoh, Onude, Agborhoro among others. Today Okpara is a thriving sub-clan in Agbon Kingdom with numerous villages and streets.

== Geography ==
Okpara Inland is bounded in the east by Kokori /Isiokolo, in the south by Ekrebuo/Orhoakpo, in the West by Ovu-inland. It is watered by Omue stream, which also runs across Kokori. Its thick forest had a substantial wildlife reserve. It has about 196 km2 land space and its topography is very much okay for agricultural and pedestrian usage.

The topography of Okpara Inland allows for the cultivation of such crops as yams, cassava, Okra, pepper, maize, melon, red-beans (locally called Isha) among others. Apart from tilling the soil they also exploited the palm trees, which grow in their bush for the production of soap, food and palm kernel as well as brooms. They had ponds they harvested often annually. The community owned the major ponds. These were either harvested every three years or more years.

The community has two network roads linked at the main junction, one of the roads lead to Isiokolo, another to Ovu and the last leads to the interior of the community. The road leading to Ovu is intercepted at another junction popularly called the Eregbe Junction which leads to Eregbe street, Okpara Boys College and to/fro Ovu community. Other roads in the community are linked together via internal networking.

This community experiences the rainy season, which begins in June and ends in early November; and the dry season, which begins in late November and ends in late may and also the northeast trade wind. During this season, deciduous plants and trees shed their leaves and the burning of bush usually marked it. These three seasons influenced the agricultural routine of pre-colonial Okpara people. For instance, during the rains, less farm work was done. The men turned to fishing in the streams and rivers.

== The People ==
The people of Okpara Inland are extremely vast and wide at large. Due to the polygamous nature of its ancestors, the people are distributed upon every facet of earth. The people of this community are known to speak the Urhobo language fluently. They are mainly pastoral and prefer to live within the reach of their immediate or extended family. The people are majorly sustenance farmers though some still do commercial farming.

The historical antecedent of trading in this community was majorly by Barter. Agricultural products like food-crops e.g. water yams could be exchanged for Okra. Although with time, cowries came to be adopted as the medium of exchange before the advent of the present legal tender of naira. The market day was held every four days. It was called Edewor and nobody was expected to go to farm on that day. Most farmers harvested their crops during the harvest period, a day to the market with a view to taking them to the market place the following day. There was also hawking in the streets on ordinary days. Kokori traders patronized Okpara Market, while many Okpara people patronized Kokori Central Market.

The major religion of the people in this community is Christianity, although traditional religion thrived before the advent of Catholicism. The people also place much value on education and scholarship as they have produced notable people in diverse areas of scholarship.

== Community Activities ==
The people of this community are known for their entertaining festivals which display an array of attires, dances, drama, etc. Among the notable festivals are the Edjenu festival which is held once every 20 years, the Eni festival which is held once every 25 years, the Okekere festival, etc.

== Education ==
The people of this community are known to be well educated and to have embraced western education wholeheartedly. Some of the schools in this community include:

- Okpara Boys Secondary School
- Agbon Girls College
- Ejaife Primary School
- Eregbe Primary School

== Notable people ==
- HRH Chamberlain Oyibocha Orovwuje (Former King of Agbon Kingdom)
- Professor Onigu Otite. Professor of Sociology, University of Ibadan, Renowned scholar and author of numerous books which include the Urhobo People and Ethnic Pluralism and Ethnicity in Nigeria.
- Professor Tanure Ojaide (Renowned Nigerian writer)
- Professor Andrew Evwaraye (Professor of Physics and former Deputy Vice Chancellor, University of Port Harcourt)
- Kefee Don-Momoh (Popular Nigerian Singer)
