= Owo soup =

Nigerian soup

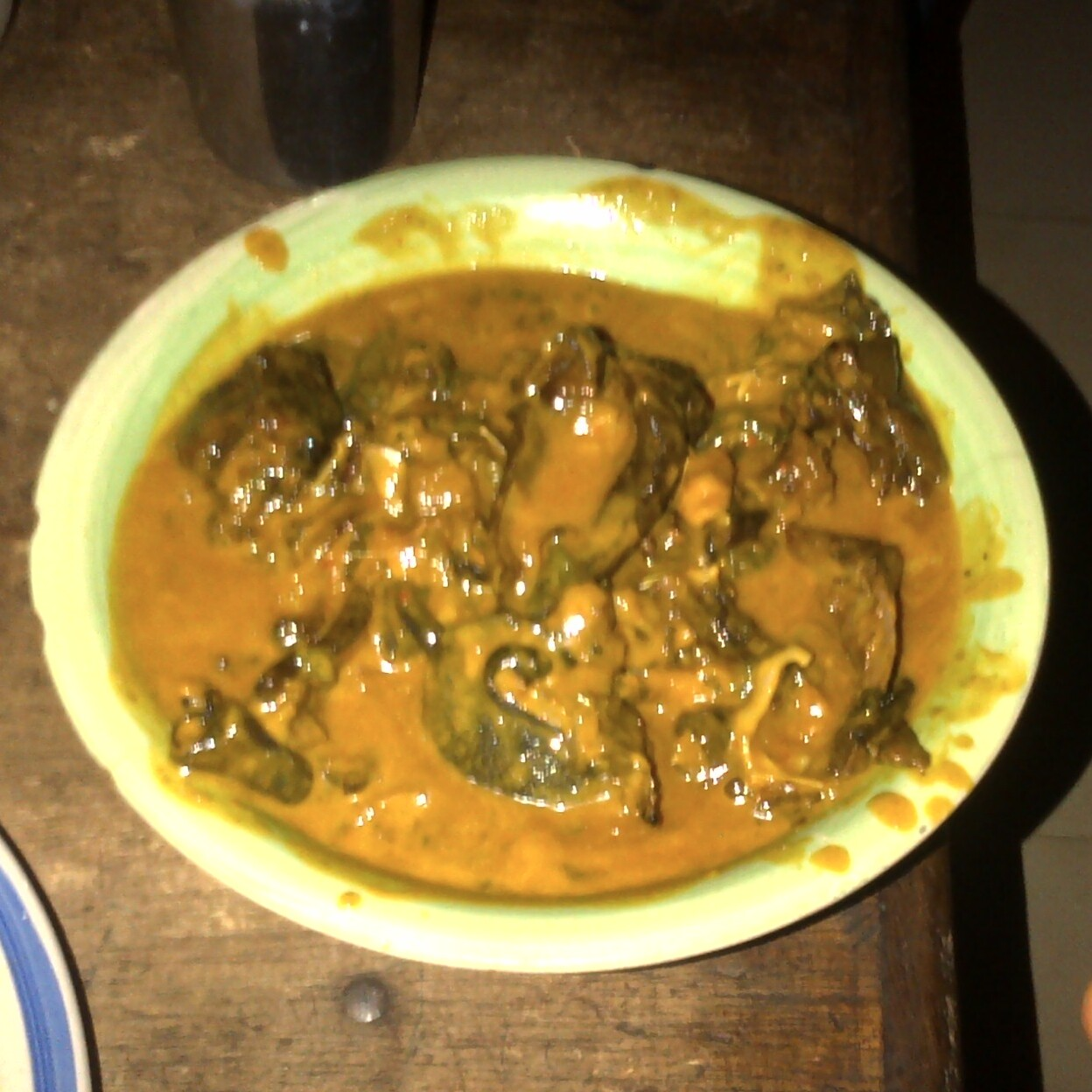
Owo soup

Oghwo evwri is a soup eaten in the south-central region of Nigeria. It is common among the Urhobo, Isoko, and Itsekiri. The soup is made with garri soaked in water after palm oil and potash mixture has been added. It is traditionally served at weddings in the Delta State; its absence at a wedding celebration is considered insulting to guests. It is also served at other traditional celebrations.

== Names and etymology ==
The soup is also called oghwevwri, oghwoevwri, oghwo or owo. It is also called oghwo ofigbo, ogwofibo and multiple other names. The name "Oghwo evwri" means "palm oil soup"; palm oil is a critical ingredient.

== Origin ==
Oghwo soup is a soup traditional to the south-central region of Nigeria. It is common among ethnic groups such as Urhobo, Benin-bini, Itsekiri, Ijaw and Edo. The soup is made with garri soaked in water after palm oil and potash mixture has been added.

There is controversy about the origination of the soup. According to history, the soup is either from the Itsekiri people, Urhobo people or Bini people. Oghwo soup is commonly taken in Delta State as well as Edo state where these tribes are populous.

== Preparation ==
Oghwo soup is made from fish, Banga oil, beef, crayfish, palm oil, potash where Garri is poured into palm oil thickened with potash. Sometimes, it is made with other ingredients such as bush meat. The Garri is blended initially to smoothen it, adding other ingredients like cray fish the soup is ready when there's floating oil on it.

== Serving ==
Oghwo soup is typically eaten with a starch (usi) such as boiled yam, boiled bananas, boiled plantain or sweet potatoes or other types of swallow but is sometimes eaten alone.

The soup is also sometimes served as a sauce.

== See also ==
- Palm nut soup
- Ukodo
- Banga rice
