= Chamberlain Orovwuje =

Nigerian monarch

Chamberlain Oyibocha Orovwuje (July 31, 1935 – June 2012), Ogurimerime I, was the Ovie of Agbon Kingdom from 1958 till 2012. He was also the former chairman of Delta State Council of Traditional Rulers. He ruled the traditional kingdom of Agbon for 54 years and was the longest reigning monarch in Delta State. He died in June 2012, at the age of 77.

Chamberlain Oyibocha Orovwuje is a scion of the Orovwuje dynasty of Okpara Inland. He was the first King (Ovie) of Agbon Kingdom in Ethiope East Local Government of Delta State. He ascended the throne in 1958 at the age of 23 years. As a young king in the 1950s, he was under the tutelage of M. G. Ejaife, the first Urhobo university graduate, Chief Otite Ijedia, Chief E.B. Eshalomi and Chief T.E.A. Salubi.
