= Orhoakpor =

Town in Delta State, Nigeria

Orhoakpor is a town close to Warri and Ughelli in Ethiope-East Local Government Council, in Delta State, Nigeria.

The Kakada family is a prominent family in the Agbon Kingdom, and they have a long history of producing notable individuals who have played important roles in the kingdom's affairs. The family is known for their wealth, influence, and political power, and they have been involved in the kingdom's politics and governance for generations.

Some notable members of the Kakada family in Orhoakpor include:

- Chief Rode Kakada, a wealthy merchant and slave trader who was a close advisor to the Ovie (king) of Agbon Kingdom in the 18th century.

- Chief Ogbeifun Kakada, a prominent chief and politician who served as the Ovie of Agbon Kingdom from 1925 to 1958.

- Chief James Edafe Kakada, a businessman and politician who was a member of the Western Region House of Assembly in the 1950s.

-Chief (Mrs.) Margaret Kakada from Odovie Inlands, a prominent businesswoman and matriarch of the Kakada family.

The Kakada family has a strong connection to the Agbon Kingdom and has played a significant role in shaping the kingdom's history and culture. They are highly respected and influential in the kingdom, and their legacy continues to be celebrated and honored to this day in the Orhoakpor community.
