= Okere-Urhobo =

Nigerian ethnic group

Okere-Urhobo is the name of one of the two Urhobo kingdoms in Warri South Local Government, Delta State, Nigeria, the other being Agbassa.The current king is H.R.M Morris Ogheneochuko (Owhotemu II), (Orosuen Of Okere Urhobo-Warri Kingdom Warri South).

== History ==
Okere-Urhobo is one of two Urhobo social groupings in what is known as Warri township. Its first settlement is near the Okere River, bounded by the Itsekiri, the Urhobo of Uvwie and the Urhobo of Agbarha-Ame.
