= Eku, Delta State =

Coordinates: 5°44′33″N 5°59′17″E

Eku is a town in Ethiope East Local Government of Delta state, Nigeria. It is located between Effurun -Abraka road with a four road junction at the center of the town. Eku has announced that it real name is Ovre Eku. This statement was made by Eku Traditional Council that it has barred anyone from addressing Ovre Eku Community as Iwevbo Community.

== Origin of the Eku people from Urhobo ==
They are several write-ups about the beginning of the Urhobo public of which Eku people are included. It is expressed that the Urhobo public had moved from Benin during the time of Oba Egbaka. Another record anyway maintains that the Urhobo which Eku was a section were traveler who had gone from Northern Edo country called Udo. While the third record states that the Urhobo public moved straightforwardly from the support of the Yoruba civilization known as Ile-Ife.

The people of Eku in Delta state were said to have gotten comfortable Ughelli, in Ugene individuals of Eku became prosperous in exchanging exercises because of their insight in exchanging and innovation in craftsmanship. Their prosperity drew the envy of their neighbors which last prompted war. During this conflict Eku was joined by her Neighboring communities who incorporate, Kokori, Ovo and Okparabe. At the pinnacle of the conflict, an Ijaw angler who attempted to intervene between them was killed. Because of this the Agbon siblings including Eku needed to move out of the Ughene region expecting that the family of the angler would assault them; as the air was at that point charge.

Subsequently, it was expressed that they needed to get comfortable Isiokoro which now their familial home. It was accounted for that they lived in harmony with each other, however because of expansion in populace they started to confront struggle which followed over farmland issues. Due to this issue battle was prompted in Eku against Ovu who were union with Ukoriri and Okpara. Together they pursue Eku up to a spot called Ogorivwo. At Ogorivwo they settled down yet before long assaulted by their adversaries. Because of this Eku needed to move from Ogorivwo to Orhouno where she was over and again attarked. They then, at that point moved Orhoaware.In this new settlement, the Eku public observed the passing of their kids at whatever point they were out in ranch. Accordingly, they needed to look for the help of an Oracle who uncovered to them the purpose for the accidents in their general public. The Oracle they counsel said that the Eku settlement was excessively near the lords of the waterway. Orhoaware where they settled didn't have any desire to be upset. The prophet told them to push a bit forward and make a road from the stream to the opposite side of the town. They named the spot Edjeba. This is where they construct their Shrine.

The harmony in Orhoaware didn't stay for long before her old adversary struck again and this prompted a savage conflict. In this conflict, Eku marched awesome contenders like the unbelievable Akpomuke, Aganbi and other fighters who held their ground with the Agbon united. During the conflict, one of the boss Akpomuke passed on. After his demise, the people of Eku utilized the strategies of publicity. They said the legendary fighter had not passed on but however had gone to gather charms. This anyway prompted the end of the conflict

== Political organization of the Eku people ==
Eku are divided into four groups: Ikreghwa, Urhusi, Ikromoku and Ikiodioka.

These roads address four children of Eku. Eku people is not at all like other culture where the ruler is the turn around which ever some portion of the public authority develops political framework depended chiefly on the family assigns headed by the Oka-Or-Oro. In this arrangement of government where the oldest man rules, then elders went to gatherings at regular intervals. The Okarooro is being given support by the Otota at whatever point he was not in the royal palace. The upkeep of the rule of law was the obligation of individual from the political framework. The compound, clan quarter and towns plays their own parts too.

Eku, as other piece of Urhobo society they establish their own way of political framework. Eku was among the couple of Urhobo towns to have rulers. Udobuhwe from Ikreghwa was supposed to be the main ruler, it was expressed that he accepted his title after he had made an excursion to Benin. It was expressed that an outing to Benin was far as well as was think about a danger, so just couple of individuals could do that. Udobuhwe was prevailed by his child Ormaka which mean the realm reaches a conclusion and the chieftaincy regime ended, the rulers royal palace in Eku showed that the followed cases and held gatherings however there is no information concerning how it went about it.

Individuals of Eku hosted a gatherings in the Urhobo hub, far away Benin and Igbos bunches were masterminded along their age bunch. The age bunches were separated into four and they incorporate: Imetete, Uvibie, Olotu, and Okpako. Imetete was made of young fellows going from between 14 and 28. They got the street free from the town up to the waterway, it was likewise their obligation to keep the town clean. The Uvibie was the following age-grade in climbing significant degree. It was for men who inside the age section of 28–30. It pioneer took guidelines from the top of the Olotu. It was composed of physically fit men. This gathering was the workforce of the Eku people group. The following age-grade (Olotu) was composed of men somewhere in the range of 30 and 50 years. It is going by Olotu-Ologbo who was additionally the president in the town armed force. They additionally completed various obligations for the town gathering: they guaranteed that the choice of the town were done, they resolved minor questions among individuals among different road and towns and arranging issues of war. The most elevated and the most senior of the age-grade was the Okpako which involves old men of 50 years or more. This gathering had a senior who was consistently the most seasoned men in the town. He was known as the Oka-or-mineral, the method of climbing into this urged office was not by political decision. In sort it was not gotten by how much a man worth either in farmland or gold. It was offered distinctly to the most senior man; if not really such individual who possesses the position would pass on. This gathering was an approach making age-grade, its individuals established most of town chamber and it plays out the legal capacity of the town. Among the female there were additionally age-grade bunches which likewise valuable to the general public.

Eku people group has the manner in which they do their things, which is administered by the law and custom of their tradition. They had a schedule which had four-week day which include: Edeki, Eduhre, Edirue and Edewode. The market was exchanged on at regular intervals time. Individuals have a day wherein their divine beings were venerated. The Eku public were war like individuals so they had faith in Echeko who they butcher a sheep to consistently.
