= Onigu Otite =

Nigerian sociologist

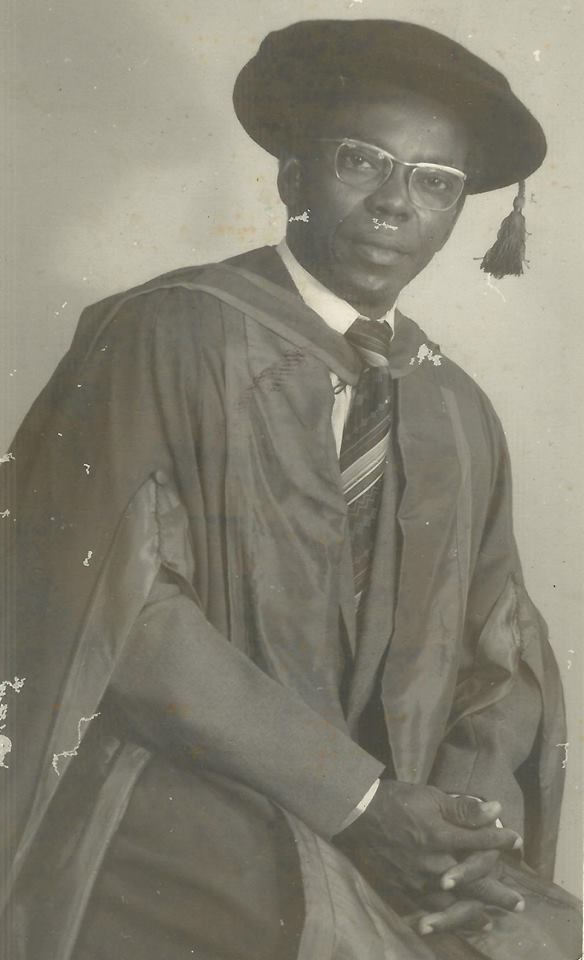
- Otite, c. 1980
- Born: January 21, 1939; Okpara Inland
- Died: March 14, 2019 (aged 80); Warri
- Resting place: Okpara Inland
- Education: University of London, United Kingdom, University of Nigeria, Nsukka, Nigeria,
- Known for: One of the pioneering anthropologists and sociologists from Nigeria and among the first set of students to attend the first indigenous Nigerian university. First Public Relations Officer of the University of Nigeria's Student Union Association
- Spouse: Regina Otite (nee Evwaraye)
- Children: Fidelia Akusu, Kenneth Onigu-Otite, Edore Onigu-Otite, Afure Otite Iloka, Jovi Otite, Odaro Augustine-Ohwo and Ovede Onigu-Otite
- Scientific career
- Fields: Sociology and Anthropology
- Workplaces: University of Ibadan
- Thesis: The Political Organization of the Urhobo of the Midwestern State of Nigeria (1969)

Onigu Otite (January 21, 1939 – March 14, 2019) was a Nigerian sociologist. He was among the first set of students to attend the first indigenous Nigerian university - University of Nigeria, Nsukka. He wrote several books including The Urhobo People, On the Path of Progress, Ethnic Pluralism and Ethnic Conflicts in Nigeria, and Introduction to Sociology which he co-authored with William Ogionwo. The Urhobo Studies Association USA Chapter regard him as one of the earliest Urhobo scholars to focus attention on the culture and history of the Urhobo People of the Niger Delta.

== Biography ==
Onigu Otite was born as Kingsley John Onigu Otite on January 21, 1939 in Okpara Inland, a village in Delta State, Nigeria. Born into a very large family, he attended the village's Catholic school. He later furthered his studies at the St Thomas Teacher Training College in Ibusa, Delta State from 1950 to 1954. He went on to teach in this school and later became the Headmaster of the St Francis Catholic School, Sapele in Delta State. He was later appointed Assistant Executive Officer, at the Ministry of Health and a year later he was made the Private Secretary (Defense) to the Prime Minister’s Office in Lagos.

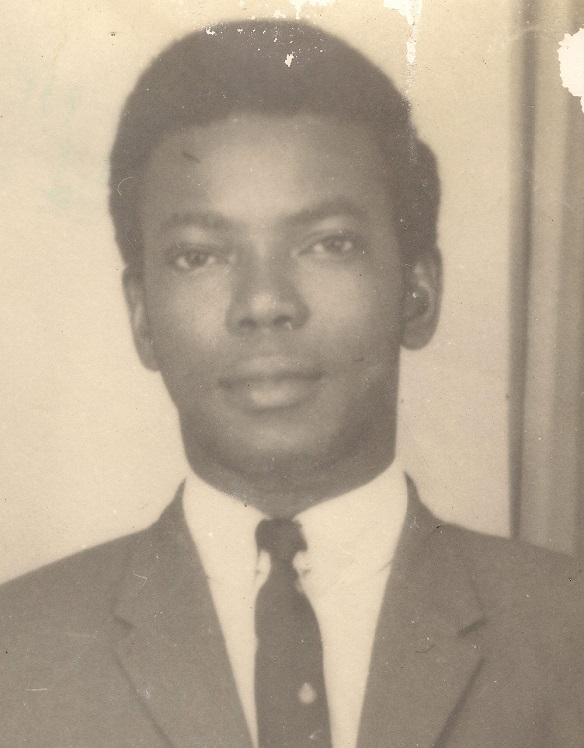
Professor Onigu Otite taken before 1980

In 1960, he decided to pursue an academic career and attended the University of Nigeria where he was one of the University's pioneer students as well as the first Student Union Public Relations Officer. After graduation, he was employed as the administrative officer, at the Ministry of Lands and Housing, Western Region, and later at the Ministry of Works and the Public Service Commission.

He was married to Dr. (Mrs) Regina Evwaraye Otite (deceased Friday July 7, 2023) and together they have seven children Fidelia Akusu, Kenneth Onigu-Otite, Edore Onigu-Otite, Afure Otite Iloka, Jovi Otite, Odaro Augustine-Ohwo and Ovede Onigu-Otite.

== Academic career ==
In 1965, he was admitted into the University of London (School of Oriental and African Studies (SOAS)). By 1969, he had earned his Ph.D. in Social Anthropology, with a thesis titled “The Political Organization of the Urhobo of the Midwestern State of Nigeria.” He then returned to Nigeria where he lectured at the University of Ibadan and became professor in 1978.

At the University of Ibadan, he was head of Department of Sociology (1980 to 1986), and Senate Representative on the Staff School Board of Governors (1977 to 1978).

Otite was visiting research professor at the University of Bergen, Norway (1986–1987), visiting professor of sociology University of Pennsylvania, (1987), senior social development research fellow at the African Centre for Applied Research and Training in Social Development, Tripoli, Libya (1990 – 1991).

He was a member of the editorial board of Political Anthropology (Netherlands); member of the Nigerian Political Science Association; member of the Nigeria Economic Society; member of the Organizing Committee, West African Regional Association of Sociologists and Anthropologists; member International Union of Anthropological and Ethnological Sciences; associate editor of the African Journal on Behavioural Sciences; and a member of the Pan African Anthropological Association.

Otite was one of the earliest Nigerian lecturers to acknowledge the significance of the past in understanding the present and thus creating a brighter future. He highlighted the major problems with the Nigerian tertiary education system; citing problems like mismanagement of public funds, under funding of the universities, negligence of the importance of the educational system and poor policy implementation. He went on to inform us that all these factors have collectively left the educational system in Nigeria lacking in university autonomy and poor staff working condition.

He also researched traditional chieftaincy title in Nigeria where he described it as long and prohibitive to attain. He eventually became a Chief of the Agbon Kingdom Uno of Agbon Kingdom. Otite has done much research on Niger Delta migration, with special focus on the Urhobo Ethnic Group. He has co-authored several books along this line most notable among them are Autonomy and Dependence: The Urhobo Kingdom of Okpe in Modern Nigeria, On The Path of Progress, A Study of Rural Immigrants and Development in Nigeria. He has also focused his research on ethnic conflicts and resolutions with particular interests in the Niger Delta ethnic groups where there are frequent communal clashes leading to disruption of crude oil production and loss of both life and property.

Otite alongside Professor Onoge were key members on the University of Ibadan who pioneered the Social Science Department as early as 1967. Otite introduced courses in Sociology at Ibadan University on African Social Thought.

He was one of the notable academicians that facilitated the founding and formation of the Michael and Cecilia Ibru University, Agharha-Otor, in Delta State.

He was listed in Africa's Who's Who published by Africa Journal Ltd For Africa Books Ltd. 1981 on page 937. He was also listed in Who's Who in Nigeria, A Daily Times Publication 1983 on page 468 as well as Who's who in the Commonwealth, Second Edition, 1984. He is also included in Who's Who in Nigeria published by Newswatch Nigeria 1990 on pages 673 and 674, Africa Who's Who, and The University of Nigeria Book of Fame.

== Writings ==
Otite wrote and co-authored more than 12 books :

- Otite, Onigu. Autonomy and Dependence: The Urhobo Kingdom of Okpe in Modern Nigeria. Evanston, Ill: Northwestern University Press, 1973. ISBN 9780810104372
- Otite, Onigu. Themes in African Social and Political Thought. Enugu, Nigeria: Fourth Dimension Publishers, 1978.
- Otite, Onigu, and William Ogionwo. An Introduction to Sociological Studies. Ibadan, Nigeria: Heinemann Educational, 1979. ISBN 9789781295089
- Otite, Onigu. The Urhobo People. Ibadan: Heinemann Education Books (Nig.) Ltd, 1982 ISBN 9789781297878
- Otite, Onigu. Ethnic pluralism and ethnicity in Nigeria : with comparative materials Ibadan, Nigeria : Shaneson, 1990. ISBN 978-0978240028
- Otite, Onigu. Readings in Nigerian rural society and rural economy Ibadan : Heinemann Educational Books (Nigeria), 1990.
- Otite, Onigu. Sociology: Theory and Applied. Lagos: Malthouse Press, 1994. ISBN 9789782601278
- Otite, Onigu. Nigeria, towards salvaging a ravaged society. Ibadan : University of Ibadan, 1996.
- Otite, Onigu, and Isaac O. Albert. Community Conflicts in Nigeria: Management, Resolution and Transformation. Abuja: Spectrum Books, 1999. ISBN 9789780291051
- Otite, Onigu. Ethnic Pluralism, Ethnicity and Ethnic Conflicts in Nigeria, Second Edition (2000) ISBN 3110898179
- Otite, Onigu. Community Conflicts in Nigeria, Management, Resolution and Transformation, 2001.
- Otite, Onigu. On The Path of Progress, A Study of Rural Immigrants and Development in Nigeria (The Urhobo of Okitipupa, Ondo State), 2002
- Otite, Onigu, Managing Nigeria's ethnic pluralism in a democratic environment Calabar, Nigeria : CATS Publishers, 2002.
- Otite, Onigu, The Ijaw factor in Urhobo migratory history. Port Harcourt, Rivers State, Nigeria : Onyoma Research Publications, 2011.
- Otite, Onigu, The presence of the past: An inaugural lecture delivered at the University of Ibadan on 5 May 1993 (An inaugural lecture 1987). University of Ibadan (1992) . ISBN 9781212799

He published over 25 articles as book chapters and over 15 articles published in learned journals. He also produced and directed a documentary and film titled An Anthropological Colour Film on Symbolism, Rituals and Ceremonies relating to the Coronation of the Orodje, King and the political life in Okpe Kingdom in Delta State, Nigeria in 1973. He has also been referenced in more than 50 books and journals worldwide as well as several online websites notably.
