= Samagidi =

Town in Delta State, Nigeria

Samagidi or Ughötö is a town in Kokori sub-clan in Agbon Kingdom in Ethiope East Local Government Council Area of Delta State It's also called the Ibruvwe Family which consist of 9 families. Samagidi is one of the oil producing community in Agbon Kingdom in Nigeria.

== Geography ==
Samagidi is bounded by Eku in the West, Okuidjerhe in the East, Urushue and orogun in the North, and Onumane and Okpara in the South.

== Education ==
There is a school, Ibruvwe Secondary School, in the village.

== Residents ==
Prominent indigenes include Chief Godwin Ogbetuo, the late Chief James Edewor, Mason Oghenejobor, Austin Oghenejobor, Sunny Akpoduado, Professor Vincent Otokunefor and Chief Emma Avworo who is the current President-General, Ogbemudiare liberty Roland A.K.A Agüero and Dr. Oghenegueke Chris Ejiro.

== Industry ==
Samagidi is an oil producing community in the Kokori oil field.
