= Jereton Mariere =

Nigerian politician

Samuel Jereton Mariere GCON

Governor of Mid-Western Region
- In office February 1964 – 16 January 1966
- Succeeded by: David Ejoor

Personal details
- Born: Adjereaton Mariere; 1907 Evwreni, Southern Nigeria Protectorate
- Died: 9 May 1971 (aged 63–64)

Samuel Jereton Mariere GCON (1907 – 9 May 1971) was the first governor of the former Mid-Western Region, Nigeria from February 1964 to January 1966. He was also the first chancellor of the University of Lagos, Akoka, Lagos and a former president of the Christian Council of Nigeria.

== Life ==
In 1935 Mariere was elected secretary-general of the Urhobo Progressive Union, an association created in 1931 to articulate and chart a direction for the Urhobo people. He was subsequently created a traditional chieftain by them, becoming the Olorogun of Evwreni in 1953. He was elected a member of the Nigerian House of Representatives for the Urhobo East and later Central district Mariere was a leader of the agitation for creation of a new region out of the old Western Region, which was dominated by the Yoruba. The Mid-Western Region was created in 1963 after a plebiscite in which all the Urhobo divisions voted unanimously in favor, and Mariere was later appointed the first governor. Following this he was given two other aristocratic titles, that of the Onisogene of Aboh in 1964 and that of the Ogifueze of Agbor in 1965.

== Death ==
Mariere died in a vehicle accident in 1971.

=== Honours ===
A student residential hall is named after him in the University of Lagos, with a life-size statue at the entrance.

Region	Period	Governor	Premier	Notes
Eastern Region	Oct 1960 - Jan 1966	Francis Akanu Ibiam	Michael Okpara	
Mid-Western Region	Aug 1963 - Feb 1964	Dennis Osadebay	Dennis Osadebay (Administrator)	Region created from part of Western Region on 8 August 1963
Mid-Western Region	Feb 1964 - Jan 1966	Jereton Mariere	Dennis Osadebay	
Northern Region	Oct 1960 - 1962	Gawain Westray Bell	Ahmadu Bello	
Northern Region	1962 - Jan 1966	Kashim Ibrahim	Ahmadu Bello	
Western Region	Oct 1960 - May 1962	Adesoji Aderemi	Samuel Ladoke Akintola	
Western Region	May 1962 - Dec 1962	Adesoji Aderemi	Moses Majekodunmi (Administrator)	Administrator appointed during political crisis
Western Region	Jan 1963 - Jan 1966	Joseph Fadahunsi	Samuel Akintola	
