= EKU =

EKU or Eku may refer to:

== Businesses and organisations ==
- Eastern Kentucky University, Richmond, United States (founded 1906)
- European Karate Union (now Federation; founded 1966)
- Evangelical Church of the Union, a German Christian denomination (1953–2004; German: Evangelische Kirche der Union)
- EKU, a German beer brand of Kulmbacher Brewery

== Other uses ==
- Eku, Delta, a town in Nigeria
- Earliest known use, of a postage stamp
- Extended Key Usage, in public key infrastructure
- Eku Edewor (born 1986), Brirish-Nigerian actress
