= Oghwoghwa =

Nigerian forefather

Oghwoghwa Is the forefather of four Urhobo Kingdoms in Urhobo Land in Nigeria, namely

- Ogor (Ogọ)
- Ughelli (Ughẹne),
- Agbarha-Otor (Agbarha) and
- Orogun.

Each of the kingdoms is headed by a traditional ruler known as Ovie (King).
