= Solomon Oboh =

Nigerian footballer

Personal information
- Date of birth: 13 September 1989
- Date of death: 9 June 2013 (aged 23)
- Place of death: Ughelli, Delta State, Nigeria
- Positions: Defender; midfielder

Senior career*
Years	Team	Apps	(Gls)
2007–2013	Warri Wolves F.C.		
- * Club domestic league appearances and goals

Solomon Oboh (13 September 1989 – 9 June 2013) was a Nigerian footballer who played as a defender or midfielder for Warri Wolves F.C.

== Death ==
Oboh died in a traffic collision on 9 June 2013 at the age of 23.
