= Agbassa =

Agbassa is the name of Otovwodo Community under Agbarha-Warri Kingdom which is one of the two Urhobo kingdoms in Warri South Local Government, Delta State, Nigeria, the other being Okere-Urhobo. The name 'Agbassa' is of British origin derives from its original name 'AGBARHA', which is still in use. The current king is H.R.M Kingsley Orereh (Igbi II), (ovie Of Agbarha-Warri Kingdom Warri South).

== Composition ==
There are approximately seven communities that make up Agbarha Kingdom (Agbassa):

1. Otovwodo (The traditional Headquarters)
2. Igbudu
3. Edjeba
4. Ogunu
5. Okurode (Okurode Urhobo)
6. Oteghele
7. Ukpokiti

In Agbassa, the Iyerin festival is celebrated annually, as well as Esemor and Iniemor. Another festival, known as Idju, is celebrated every two years throughout all the communities of Agbassa, as well as Okere-Urhobo. This festival is called Idju Owhurie Festival, popularly known as Agbassa Juju, and it centers around the worship of the Owurhie, an Urhobo deity.

However, the impact of western civilization as well as the spread of Christianity in Nigeria seemed to have led to a decline in the worship of the Owurhie, as many Urhobo people have now become Christians and have nothing to do with idol worship.

== Igbudu Market ==
Agbarha Kingdom (Agbassa) is home to Igbudu Market which was named after Igbudu Community of the Agbarha-Warri Kingdom, and which is also noted for being "the biggest market in the state".

== Commendation of current king ==
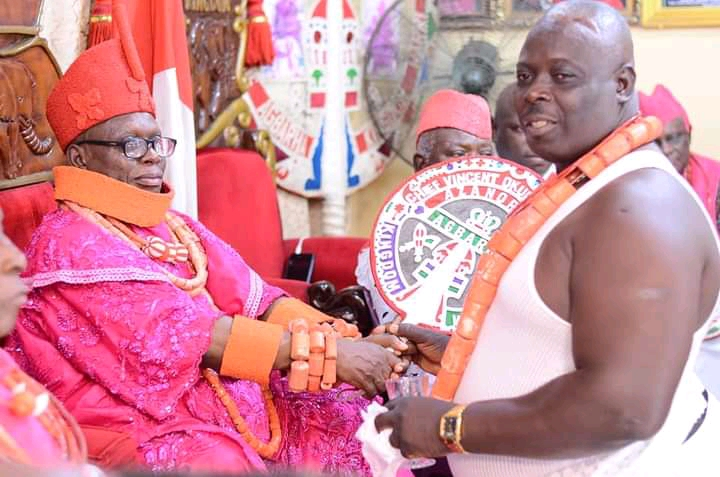
H.R.M Orhifi, one of the past kings

In August 2024, the Vanguard Newspaper commended the current king H.R.M Kingsley Emakpo Orereh (Igbi II) for being "so refined, cultured, versatile, courageous, educated, outspoken, polite, committed, successful, invaluable, and accessible", which it said helped him to be "widely accepted, celebrated, loved, and cherished", with him being dubbed "the City King".

== Notable people ==
- Gideon Urhobo, founder of the God's Kingdom Society
