= Oghenetega =

- Gender: Unisex
- Language: Urhobo

Origin
- Word/name: Urhobo People
- Meaning: God is worthy

Oghenetegaaudio is an unisex name but mostly given to a male child originated from Nigeria. It is named among Urhobo people in Nigeria. Oghene means 'God" while Tega means 'worthy', the name Oghenetega signifies 'God is worthy'. The name is also popular in Libya.

== Notable people ==
- Tammy Abraham (born 2 October 1997), English professional footballer.
- Josh Onomah (born 27 April 1997), English professional footballer.
- Marvel Ekpiteta (born 26 August 1995), English footballer.
