= Gamaliel Onosode =

Gamaliel Oforitsenere Onosode (22 May 1933 – 29 September 2015) was a Nigerian technocrat, administrator and a former presidential candidate of the All Nigeria People's Party of Nigeria. Educated at the Government College, Ughelli and the University of Ibadan, he emerged in the 1970s as one of Nigeria's leading educated chief executives, when he was at the helm of NAL merchant bank of Nigeria. Over the years, he rose to become a leading boardroom player in Nigeria's corporate environment. He was also a former presidential adviser to President Shehu Shagari and a former president of the Nigerian Institute of Management.

In 2013, he founded the Gamaliel & Susan Onosode Foundation (GAMSU), to help improve education in Nigeria, and provide support for educational and societal development causes in Nigeria.

== Life and career ==
An Urhobo man, born and raised in Sapele, a suburban city in the current Delta State by a disciplined father, he sometimes credited the strict family background and practice as being a complementary factor in his success as a disciplined civil servant and corporate administrator.

Throughout his career, Onosode has chaired several private and public sector businesses and initiatives. He was the Chairman of Dunlop Nigeria Plc (1984–2007), a former chairman of Cadbury Nigeria Plc (1977–93), the Presidential Commission on Parastatals (1981), Nigeria LNG Working Committee and Nigeria LNG Limited (1985–90) and the Niger Delta Environmental Survey (since 1995). He was also the Chairman of Zain Nigeria, a GSM telecommunications company, the oldest GSM operator in Nigeria.

Onosode was Presidential Adviser on Budget Affairs and Director of Budget (1983). He was a Fellow of the Economic Development Institute of the World Bank, the Nigerian Institute of Management, of which he was President (1979–82). He was also a Fellow of The Chartered Institute of Bankers of Nigeria, having been elected to membership of its Board of Fellows in 1998.

In addition, Onosode was the inaugural President of the Chartered Institute of Stockbrokers, past Pro-Chancellor and Chairman of the Governing Council of the University of Uyo and past and inaugural President & Chairman of Council of the Association of Pension Funds of Nigeria. He was an Honorary Fellow of the Nigerian Academy of Letters and held Honorary D.Sc. degrees of Obafemi Awolowo University (1990), the University of Benin (1995), the Rivers State University of Science and Technology (2003) and University of Lagos (2014) as well as Honorary D.D. degree of The Nigerian Baptist Theological Seminary, Ogbomoso (2002).

=== Public service ===
Primarily a business personality, he saw his career wade through different sectors of the Nigerian economic environment. Though, he was a part of a profligate democratic experiment which was the Nigerian Second Republic, Gamaliel Onosode tried to bring a disciplined approach to public finance. Towards the end of 1983, when public confidence in the economic direction of the country was eroded and accountability was lacking in government subsidies to public enterprises, he was brought in to find solutions to the lackluster performance of public enterprises, as the head of a Nigerian Commission on public parastatals and to bring in a disciplined approach to government subsidies. The offshoot of his honest and disciplined approach earned him respect from subsequent administrations. A report which was later tagged the Onosode report, an outgrowth of his role as the chairman of the commission to review Nigerian parastatals was the first in the nation to tackle comprehensively, the industrialisation drive and capital spending which dominated the oil boom of the 1970s and the early 1980s. The report identified five major defects in planning which it believed had become evident by the end of 1983:

- Public capital expenditure rose during the oil boom at a much faster rate than Nigeria's physical, technical or financial abilities.
- Huge expenditure on particular industrial projects did not yield expected returns because of "inappropriate choices in their selection, size, design, location and management."
- Government policies laid too much emphasis on industrialisation, without regard to Nigeria's resource base and comparative advantage.
- Frequent changes in fiscal and monetary policies created planning problems for the private sector.
- The exchange rate of the naira was not managed "to reflect the basic strength of the economy and the need to encourage domestic production.

In 1995, he became the Chairman of the Niger Delta Environmental Survey, a non-governmental organisation that conducted scientific studies on environmental and social impact assessment of oil exploration in the Niger delta. The survey was partly financed by Shell. The survey reports which apportioned responsibilities and blame for much of the environmental degradation in the region on oil operators, the federal government and communities has not been made public.

Deacon Onosode was an alumnus of the University of Ibadan, and contributed immense time to see through philanthropic and governing matters concerning the university. He was the former Pro-Chancellor of the University and Chairman of its Governing Council.

He was also a devout Christian and started Good News Baptist Church in his Sitting Room on 1 Feb.1984. Good News Baptist Church is now a large church of over 2,000 people and ranks high in the Nigerian Baptist Convention in terms of missions and evangelism. Gamaliel Onosode was the inaugural Chairman of the Global Missions Board of the Nigerian Baptist Convention. In addition, Onosode is Chairman of the Governing Council of the Nigerian Baptist Theological Seminary, Ogbomoso, Nigeria's oldest degree awarding theological institution, which in 2008 marked 110 years of its existence while the University of Ibadan was 60 years old. On 29 September 2015, he died at the age of 82 after losing a battle with bone cancer.

Legacy

Gamaliel Onosode was well known in Nigeria as a disciplined technocrat. In his private and public dealings, his character earned him nicknames like "Mr. Integrity" and "Nigeria's Incorruptible Man".

Gamaliel & Susan Onosode Foundation

His philanthropy was one to be reckoned with in his life time, a legacy he transferred into corporate existence with the founding of GAMSU. The organisation exists today to give support to Nigeria's education system, and to provide seamless and flexible solutions to the problems associated with learning in Nigeria. GAMSU gives awards to excellent students in secondary schools and offers scholarships to university students. In recent times, the organisation made a donation to the Lagos Business School for the building of a research facility in memory of Gamaliel Onosode. A partnership with General Electric Healthcare Institute allowed GAMSU train 45 nurses in Lagos as part of a drive to improve the maternal mortality rate in Nigeria. The organisation also pursues school rehabilitation projects and provide facilities to help create a better teaching and learning experience.

The Foundation has its office at 44, Adelabu Street, Surulere, the old residence of the legendary Gamaliel Onosode.
