= Banga rice =

Nigerian rice dish

Banga rice or roso-amme-edi
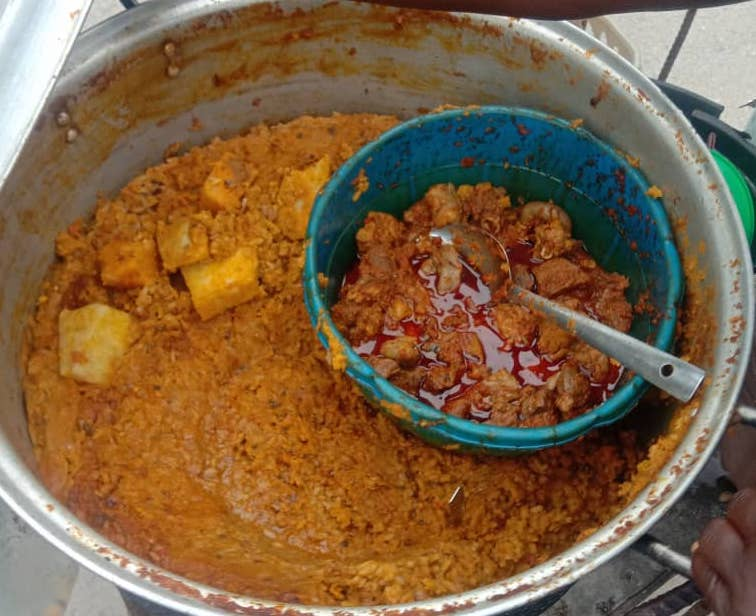
- Type: Rice
- Place of origin: Nigeria
- Region or state: Ethiop region of Delta, Nigeria
- Created by: Urhobo people of Delta, Nigeria
- Main ingredients: Pulp from palm fruit, salt, water, parboiled white rice, other seasonings, onions, meat, fish, dry shrimp for added flavor

Banga rice is a traditional Nigerian food prepared with palm fruit like in palm nut soup. The dish is common among the Urhobo people of southern Nigeria. Banga is the juice extracted from palm nut fruit. It is called banga rice after the juice extracted from the palm nut is cooked with parboiled white rice.

The Urhobo people do not add special spices like taiko, benetientien, and rogoje to the banga rice when they prepare the dish like they do when preparing banga soup.

== Overview ==
The palm fruit extract used in making banga rice is common across the Niger Delta, South-East, and South-West regions of Nigeria. Banga rice is a reinvented version of jollof rice, known for its rich flavor and soft texture, as the rice absorbs the distinct taste of the palm fruit extract during cooking.

It can be served with side options such as fried plantain, coleslaw, protein, and a drink of choice. The palm fruit extract used in preparing it contains antioxidants, while the rice and ingredients such as crayfish and fish provide carbohydrates for energy, protein, and omega-3 fatty acids.

== Ingredients ==
- Rice
- Palmnut
- Seasoning cubes
- Salt
- Crayfish
- Fresh pepper
- Onions
- Ocimum gratissimum (optional)

== See also ==
- Jollof rice
- Rice and peas
- Fried rice
- Coconut rice
