= Cghene =

Supreme god of the Urhobo and Isoko people

Cghene, is the supreme god of the Urhobo and Isoko people in southern Nigeria. He is believed to have created the world and all peoples. Cghene is beyond human comprehension and is only known by his actions. Because the god is so distant and unknown, he has no temples or priests and no prayers or sacrifices are offered directly to him.

Cghene has a courier named Oyise, who is referred to as uko Cghene or "messenger of Cghene". Through Oyise, Cghene can be invoked in case of calamity or need. The Etsako speaking people of Northern Edo state, Nigeria also call God or the supreme entity Oghena, which is very similar to Cghene, this is not unrelated to the shared ancestry or cultural interrelatedness of various indigenous groups to the ancient Benin empire which was dominant in that current space of Southern Nigeria.
