= Ovey =

Ovey is a surname. Notable people with the surname include:

- Sir Esmond Ovey (1879–1963), British ambassador
- George Ovey (1870–1951), American film actor and comedian
- Mike Ovey (1958–2017), British Anglican clergyman, academic, and lawyer

== See also ==
- Ovie
