= Kokori =

- suburb
- Nickname: The Oil Field Town
- Interactive map of Kokori
- Country: Nigeria
- State: Delta State

Area
  - Total: 196 km^{2} (76 sq mi)

Population (1963)
  - Total: 900,897
- Time zone: UTC+1 (WAT)
- Postal code: 330

Kokori is one of the six suburban 'states' of the Agbon 'kingdom' in LGA Ethiope East, Delta State, Nigeria. The other 'states' are Okpara, Eku, Ovu, Orhoakpor, and Igun.

== Geography ==
Its land area is 196 square kilometres and is blessed with a period of downpour which lasts seven months (from March to October) and a relative five months of little or no rain (from October to February). It has twenty nine streets and roads; and it is surrounded by thirty village communities, including Samagidi a rapidly developing township. Network of streams and creeks cuts across different parts of Kokori territory. Three major streams are identifiable: the Omwe stream on Eku road, Iranzo stream on Orogun road and Erhanaka stream on Kokori – Ofuoma road.

It is a hinterland bounded by Eku and Igun on the north; by Ugono, Orhomaru, Erhobaro, Ovara and Idionvwan villages all in Orogun, on the east; on the west by Isiokolo and Okpara Inland in Agbon 'sub-nation'; and by Awirhe in Agbara and Odovie in Ughelli on the south.

The entire Kokori land is flat and situated in the evergreen tropical forest zone which is dominated by the oil palm tree.

== History ==
Kokori's original name was 'Ukori' and her people were called 'Uhwokori', an abbreviation of 'Ihwo-ru-Ukori'. The Uhwerun people changed the name to 'Tokori' when Agbon people led by Ukori, their ancestral father, migrated to stay on their land. British colonial administrators further changed the name to Kokori which she now bears. Five waves of migration birthed Kokori. First, from Benin to Asseh. Second, from Asseh to Irri. Third, from Irri to Uhwerun. A fourth migration graced the face of Urhobo history when they migrated to Isiokolo. In 1606 A.D, the incessant invasions and the conspiracy against the Kokori people because of the discord which bedevilled the four Agbon families- Okpara, Ukori, Eku and Orhoakpor- made Isiokolo turbulent and the Agbon families began to migrate to their respective present sites.

== Mentifacts ==
Kokori is cradle for the Igbe religion which began in 1858; founded by Ubiecha of Egbo Street in Kokori. Although it had no written constitution like the Decalogue of ancient Israel, it was able to mould Kokori society into one worthy of stay. The Igbe religion spread to many destinations beyond Kokori and the Urhobo nation at large. In fact, based on its monotheistic vocation and puritan practices, it gained international platform – a congregation was established in London for the adherents in that destination.

As regards her festivals, three festivals rear their terrific heads – Egba, Orerode and Ibi festivals respectively. The Egba festival celebrates the Egba fetish; the Orerode festival celebrates the ancestors of the Kokori people while the Ibi festival commemorates the gun fires that were fired against the invaders who threatened their sovereignty. The Egba and Orerode festivals are celebrated annually while the Ibi festival is celebrated once in a century.

== Demographics ==
Kokori people speak one tongue- urhobo. Kokori does not frown at intra-marriage and neither does it not smile at inter-marriage which enhances integration. In the first quarter of the twentieth century, Christianity was introduced to Kokori via the arrival of the Roman Catholic Mission in 1905 in Umiahwa quarter of the town; the Anglican Mission at Urhuokpokpo quarter in 1927; and the Baptist Mission at Anaka quarter in 1945. Thus, most of the people practice Christianity; some the Igbe religion which originated in Kokori in the pre-colonial era and found its way to the contemporary era and other parts of Nigeria; few, traditional faith; and, a very few, Islam.

== Administration ==
Kokori is divided into three administrative quarters- Alaka, Urhuokpokpo and Umiahwa. And the Okarorho is the administrative head of the town, in the absence of the Ovie. He rules by a council (Ehonvwore). The okarorho's spokesman is the otota who also is the spokesman of the town.

== Mineral resources ==
In 1958, Shell Petroleum Development Company carried out an exploration work which led to the discovery of crude oil on Kokori soil. She has over twenty oil wells and second best crude oil in the world by reason of its low sulphur content. In 1994, Kokori generated N68 billion for the federal government of Nigeria.

== Education ==
- Kokori Boys Grammar School
- Now St. Kevin's College, wholly owned by the Catholic mission.
- Egbo Commercial Grammar School
- Kokori Mixed Secondary School
- Kokori Girls Grammar School.
- Oziegbe Primary School
- Erhijere Primary School
- Anigboro Primary School

== Bibliography ==
- Sunday Odje, Kokori People, Ancient and Modern, Benin: Assembly Printers, 1995.
