= Ejaita =

- Language: Urhobo

Origin
- Word/name: Nigeria
- Meaning: Let them say

Ejaitaaudio is a given name in Delta state among Urhobo people in Nigeria. Ejaita means "let them say" or "let them talk". It is often used to imply that the child will succeed in life. It is a unisex giving name.

== Names of notable individual ==
- Diana Ejaita born in Italy, she is a Nigerian-Italian illustrator and textile designer.
- Ejaita Ifoni (born 13 February 2000) he is a Nigerian footballer
