= Igbe religion =

The Igbe religion, popularly known as Igbe (an Urhobo word meaning dance), was founded by Ubiecha Etarakpo in 1858 and has its headquarters at 11, Egbo Street, Kokori Inland, Ethiope East Local Government Area, Delta State, Nigeria.

It is a religion based on dance as its medium of worship to God. It began as a Urhobo-Kokori traditional sect, and in the 20th century was influenced by Christian evangelism.

Originating in Kokori, it gradually spread in the Urhobo nation and wider austral Nigeria.

== Beliefs ==
The Igbe religion is monotheistic with an omnipresent, omnipotent, omniscient and omnibenevolent God named Oghene. He is believed to reward the good and evil alike according to their deeds.

Dance is a core element of the Igbe faith. Adherents believe that by dancing, they draw on themselves the very hand of the one God.

== Practises ==
Dancing is central to Igbe worship sessions, and music is generally native Urhobo songs in place of hymns. At worship services, Igbe priests are vested in white robes and headgear, administering native chalk to the worshippers for their protection.

Fellow Igbe worshippers also don white attire, with their necks powdered white as they carry basins and small stools. When native drums beat, they sway left and right in a dance, as though possessed by a deity.

The Igbe celebrate the annual Ore Isi feast for twelve days in May, drawing thousands of attendees. The religion‘s holy day is known as Edigbe, meaning “the day of joy”.

== History ==
Igbe was founded in 1858, in Kokori Nigeria. Ubiecha Etarakpo allegedly saw an apparition of two divine beings, who “anointed” him to preach against immorality and witchcraft. After the alleged apparition, Ubiecha became eccentric, acting insanely as he would dance each day. This scared people from coming close to him. It was also alleged that after his alleged vision, Ubiecha performed amazing miracles, accurately predicted the future, healed the sick, and correctly identified witches.

He built a worship house called ogua in his compound, and from there, ministered to the people with native white chalk while also continuing his prophesying. This brought followers across the Urhobo lands to Kokori. Ubiecha died in 1920, after gaining fame and wealth.

== Divisions ==
After Ubiecha’s death and burial, his children embroiled in a succession dispute. By tradition, his eldest son, Ibodje Ubiecha, succeeded his father as chief priest and head prophet; his half-brother, Akpokovo Ubiecha, established a rival branch in Kokori. One of Ibodje's daughters, Mary Ibodje, was a priestess who also splintered to establish her own branch before Ibodje died in 1986. His eldest son, Mcdonald Ibodje, his eldest son, succeeded him. Ref Joshua Ibodje

== Syncretism ==
With the influx of Christianity into Kokori in the 20th century, Igbe was influenced by the presence and works of evangelism.

Another Igbe sect was founded by Chief Ogbevire Ogogo and Akpomudjere Obero, which was infused with some elements of Christianity. They observed Christmas and New Year alongside Igbe festivals. It gained recognition and spread in Delta, Edo, Ondo, Rivers and Lagos states.

== Demographics ==
Though the Igbe extends beyond Urhobo land, the bulk of adherents are Urhobo people, and the principal lingua franca and liturgical language is Urhobo.

== Criticism ==
Igbe has been criticized for rejecting conventional medical treatment. Igbe adherents believe and administer the native white chalk to treat ailments, and this has been viewed as dangerous.

There have been objections to the primacy of Urhobo language at worship sessions, and it has been criticized as idol worship.
