= Oghenefejiro =

Given name

- Language: Urhobo

Origin
- Word/name: Nigeria , Urhobo
- Meaning: God is Praise worthy

Oghenefejiro audiois a name that is common among Urhobo people in Nigeria. It is a unisex given name which means ''God is praiseworthy''or "God deserves to be praise''. The name is also sometimes given to a female child in Delta state among Urhobo people

== Notable individuals with the name ==
- Praise Oghenefejiro Idamadudu (born 18 December 1998) is a Nigeria female track and field sprinter.
- Makayla Malaka (born 27 June 2012) popularly known as Makayla Malaka, is a British-Nigerian singer and dancer.
