= Gideon Urhobo =

Nigerian religious leader

Saint Gideon Meriodere Urhobo
- In office February 1934 – February 1952

Personal life
- Born: Gregory Mogburuko Ukoli; 1903 Ogharegi, Nigeria
- Died: February 25, 1952 (aged 48–49)
- Notable work: My Mission to the World Lecture Series

Religious life
- Religion: Christianity
- Founder of: God's Kingdom Society

Senior posting
- Post: Life President

Saint Gideon Meriodere Urhobo (formerly known as Gregory Mogburuko Ukoli) was the founder of God's Kingdom Society (GKS). He served as its life president from its inception in 1934 until his passing in 1952.

== Early life and career ==
Gideon Urhobo was born in 1903 at Ogharegi, a small fishing port near the Ethiope River, to a Christian mother and a non-Christian father. He hailed from Agbarha in Warri South Local Government Area of Delta State, Nigeria. He received his initial education at the Government School in Warri, where he also worked as a teacher. In his early years, he converted to and adhered to strict Roman Catholicism, and was baptized but not confirmed. Later, after disagreeing with certain of the Roman Catholic Church's beliefs, he broke away from the religion. A few months later, in June 1930, he began working for the Post and Telegraph department as a third-class clerk and telegraphist. He saw a South African advertisement for The Watchtower literature while at work. He got the literature and started reading it and his Bible together. In 1932, he met Mr. William Roland Brown in Benin. Mr. Brown was the Trinidadian representative of Watchtower in West Africa. Brown invited him to Lagos so he could buy books for twenty-five dollars on credit. After receiving the books, he sent them to his friends Macauley J. Orode and Gabriel Agbenoma so they could be distributed to the public. Urhobo resigned his position as a clerk in 1933 to advance the gospel of Jesus Christ. He became a full time preacher for the Watchtower Society.

== Founding and spread of God's Kingdom Society (GKS) ==
Gideon Urhobo was influenced by some of the doctrines of the Jehovah's Witnesses, but he began to create a unique conviction in his mission beginning from 1934. In his biography, he wrote:

...after three and half years diligent and prayerful study of the Holy Bible, Jesus Christ revealed himself to me in a vision and commanded me to go and proclaim the good news of God's Kingdom (or Gospel of Peace) to all Nations as the only remedy for all human sufferings and woes; to expose all false doctrines which Satan had used to deceive the people and to keep them in ignorance of GOD’S ESTABLISHED KINGDOM or GOVERNMENT OF RIGHTEOUSNESS AND PEACE, and purpose of creation, and to pronounce God's written judgement against wickedness.

With this mission in mind, he disagreed with William Roland Brown over the following teachings of the Jehovah's Witnesses: The failed predictions, including the prediction that Armageddon would occur in 1936 or 1937; the Jehovah's Witnesses' doctrine on Marriage; the belief that only 144,000 people will be going to heaven; the Memorial celebration; the practice of preaching by women; the very name, "Jehovah's Witnesses"; and the assertion that the religious group had "no human leader" (when at that time Joseph Franklin Rutherford was its global president).

Urhobo and some of his friends split from Watchtower in October 1934 to start his own Society in Lagos, called "the Lagos Division of Jehovah’s Witnesses". From that point on, Urhobo started debating and criticizing Watchtower's beliefs. He also criticized the Muslim faith, and mainline churches—particularly the Roman Catholic Church. he began to deliver a series of lectures entitled, "My Mission to the World", in different parts of Nigeria. Urhobo later renamed his group the "Lagos Company of Christian People" in 1939 due to objections from Mr. W. R. Brown. Under Saint Urhobo's guidance, the Church expanded to Port Harcourt in 1940. Concerns from Port Harcourt members about the exclusive name led to a change to the "Nigerian Christian Society" in 1942. In 1943, members in the Gold Coast (now Ghana) pushed for inclusivity, prompting a renaming to God's Kingdom Society (GKS). Concurrently, Saint Urhobo adopted a new name, Gideon Meriodere Urhobo, in 1943, in homage to his great-great-grandfather, Urhobo. His movement, God's Kingdom Society grew into hundreds of members by the 1950s. Saint Urhobo founded Church branches in Lagos (1934), Port Harcourt (1940), Warri, and Sapele (1942), followed by Onitsha (1946) and Aba (1948).

== Political interventions ==
Gideon Urhobo began to intervene in the political struggle for the independence of Nigeria when he aligned with and helped Dr. Nnamdi Azikiwe in the nationalist cause. Later, when the party's leadership asserted that Jehovah of the Bible had no part in Nigerian nationalism, he disagreed with Dr. Nnamdi Azikiwe and the National Council of Nigeria and the Cameroons (NCNC). They held that the sun was the "god of Africa" in an attempt to reject western religion as they fought to free themselves from western colonization.

Other than the "weeping Jeremiahs," Dr. Azikiwe made no statements after Urhobo started attacking the N.C.N.C. in June 1951. Azikiwe had remained silent for two reasons. First of all, Urhobo was popular, and the N.C.N.C. opposing him as a group would only make him more so, particularly when it came to the question of God in Nigeria. Secondly, at every location where Urhobo preached against the N.C.N.C., there were additional elements that worked against his objectives. Urhobo began to support the Action Group, a rival party founded by Chief Obafemi Awolowo, up until the general elections of 1951–1952.

Gideon Urhobo died on February 25, 1952, while a partial eclipse of the sun occurred. The Daily Times of Saturday, January, 1952 carried his advertisement on page five entitled: “My Mission to the World”.

== Gideon Urhobo Literature ==
Gideon Urhobo wrote and delivered a series of lectures entitled. "My Mission to the World". In 2004, a book entitled, "Gideon M. Urhobo and the God's Kingdom Society in Nigeria", was written by Professor Daniel I. Ilega of the University of Port Harcourt.
