= Warri =

- City
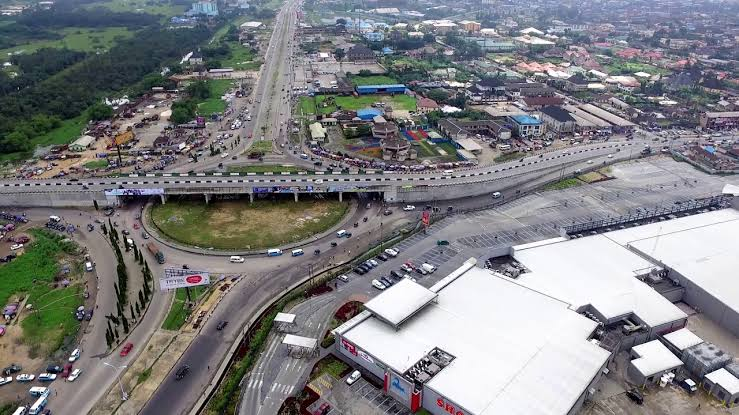
- Nicknames: Waffi, Waff, Waff Town
- Location in Nigeria
- Coordinates: 5°31′N 5°45′E
- Country: Nigeria
- State: Delta State
- Local Government Area: Warri South LGA

Government
  - Executive Governor: Sheriff Oborevwori

Area
  - City: 214.8 km^{2} (82.9 sq mi)

Population (2016)
  - Urban: 363,382
  - Urban density: 12,112.73/km^{2} (31,371.8/sq mi)
  - Metro: 1,043,122
  - Metro density: 5,215.61/km^{2} (13,508.4/sq mi)

Demographics
  - Ethnicities: Urhobo, Ijaw, ItsekiriUrhobo IgalaNupe
  - Languages: Pidgin English, Urhobo, Ijaw, Itsekiri and Urhobo
  - Religions: 95% Christianity; 3% African Traditions; 2% Islam

GDP (PPP, 2015 int. Dollar)
  - Year: 2023
  - Total: $10.9 billion
  - Per capita: $11,100
- Time zone: UTC+1 (West Africa Time)

The city of Warri is an oil hub within South-South Nigeria and houses an annex of the Delta State Government House. Warri is one of the major hubs of the petroleum industry in Nigeria. Warri, Udu, Okpe and Uvwie are the commercial capital of Delta State with a population of over 311,970 people in 2006. The city is the indigenous territory of UrhoboItsekiri, Urhobo and Ijaw people.

Warri shares boundaries with Uvwie to the east, Udu to the south east, Ogbe-ijoh to the south, and other communities in Warri South LGA to the west.

Warri sits on the bank of Warri River which joins Forcados River and Escravos River through Jones Creek in the lower Niger Delta Region. The city has a modern seaport, which serves as the cargo transit point between the Niger River and the Atlantic Ocean for import and export.

Warri served as the capital of the colonial Warri Province during the early 1900s when this part of Delta State was under the Colony and Protectorate of Southern Nigeria.

== History ==
=== Etymology ===
The name 'WARRI' was first associated with the Itsekiri ancestral capital town of Ode Itsekiri which the locals also refer to as 'Iwerre'. A mispronunciation of Iwerre by several European explorers probably resulted in various names like AWERRI, OUWERI, WARRE, WARREE, etc. The British eventually anglancised it as WARRI.

The capital town Ouwere, which gives its name to the whole country, lies on the river Forcado, about thirty six or seven leagues up from its mouth, and is near two miles about, being encompass'd on the land-side with groves and thickets, the ordinary residence of the king of Ouwere.

— Jean Barbot,

=== British Advent pre-Warri ===
British colonialism effectively took off in the Western Niger Delta with the proclamation of the Oil Coast Protectorate by Great Britain in June 1885. British colonial administration was carried out through local chiefs like Nana Olomu of Ebrohimi in Benin River. This administration was effectively restricted to Benin River and its environs as the British were content with conducting trade with the people of the hinterlands through the Itsekiri as middlemen.

=== Creation of Warri ===
The British decided to move the seat of the administration of the Niger Coast Protectorate from the capital Ode-Itsekiri (Warri or Iwerre) to the uplands to have effective control of the hinterlands. In order to achieve this, the British in 1906 took a lease of a new trading station opened in 1898 on virgin lands for Alexander Miller Brothers Limited of Liverpool at the mouth of the Okere Creeks. This new trading station was also named WARRI after the capital Ode-Itsekiri so the Itsekiris dubbed Ode-Itsekiri BIG WARRI in order to differentiate Ode-Itsekiri from the new trading station.

== Demographics ==
Its inhabitants are predominantly Christians of different denominations, and some practice a mixture of African traditional religions like most of Southern Nigeria. The city is known nationwide for its unique Pidgin, mostly among the less educated or uneducated.

== Climate ==
The area is characterised by a tropical monsoon climate (Köppen Am) with a mean annual temperature of 26.7 °C (80.1 °F) and an annual rainfall amount of 2,770 mm (109 in). High temperatures are typically between 28 and 32 °C (82.4 and 89.6 °F). The climate is monsoonal and marked by two distinct seasons: the dry season and the rainy season. The dry season lasts from about November to April and is significantly marked by the cool "harmattan" dusty haze from the north-east trade winds. The rainy season spans May to October with a brief drier spell in August, but it frequently rains even in the dry season. The surrounding region is predominantly rainforest, tending to swamplands in some areas. The vegetation is rich in timber trees, palm trees, as well as fruit trees.

Climate data for Warri (1991–2020)
Month	Jan	Feb	Mar	Apr	May	Jun	Jul	Aug	Sep	Oct	Nov	Dec	Year
Record high °C (°F)	37 (99)	38.5 (101.3)	37.5 (99.5)	37.6 (99.7)	36.2 (97.2)	35.1 (95.2)	34.4 (93.9)	33.7 (92.7)	34 (93)	36.4 (97.5)	36.5 (97.7)	36.8 (98.2)	38.5 (101.3)
Mean daily maximum °C (°F)	33.3 (91.9)	34.2 (93.6)	34.1 (93.4)	33.4 (92.1)	32.7 (90.9)	30.9 (87.6)	29.2 (84.6)	29.0 (84.2)	29.9 (85.8)	31.3 (88.3)	32.9 (91.2)	33.4 (92.1)	32.0 (89.6)
Daily mean °C (°F)	28.2 (82.8)	29.4 (84.9)	29.5 (85.1)	29.0 (84.2)	28.4 (83.1)	27.3 (81.1)	26.3 (79.3)	26.2 (79.2)	26.6 (79.9)	27.5 (81.5)	28.5 (83.3)	28.4 (83.1)	27.9 (82.2)
Mean daily minimum °C (°F)	23.1 (73.6)	24.6 (76.3)	24.9 (76.8)	24.6 (76.3)	24.1 (75.4)	23.6 (74.5)	23.4 (74.1)	23.3 (73.9)	23.4 (74.1)	23.6 (74.5)	24.1 (75.4)	23.5 (74.3)	23.9 (75.0)
Record low °C (°F)	15 (59)	16 (61)	19 (66)	19 (66)	19 (66)	18 (64)	20.6 (69.1)	20 (68)	19.4 (66.9)	19 (66)	19 (66)	17 (63)	15.0 (59.0)
Average precipitation mm (inches)	27.2 (1.07)	59.9 (2.36)	133.5 (5.26)	214.3 (8.44)	275.5 (10.85)	343.2 (13.51)	491.4 (19.35)	330.7 (13.02)	432.0 (17.01)	366.8 (14.44)	120.9 (4.76)	28.2 (1.11)	2,823.5 (111.16)
Average precipitation days (≥ 1.0 mm)	2.2	3.7	8.9	12.0	15.5	18.4	21.4	18.2	21.1	19.2	8.9	2.7	152.1
Average relative humidity (%)	80.3	83.5	87.5	89.5	90.9	91.4	90.7	89.6	91.2	91.4	88.7	82.4	88.1
Source: NOAA

== Economy and infrastructure ==
There is the Warri Refinery and Petrochemicals located at Ekpan and Ubeji, Warri proportionately with the majority of international and local oil companies operating in Nigeria having their operational offices close by. One of the nation's major seaports is sited within Ugbuwangue, Warri.

Due to conflict in the late 90s, especially in 1999, most oil companies fled the town and nearby regions.

=== Security ===
Warri is garrisoned by the Amphibious Infantry battalion (Effurun Army Base) located in the Effurun area.

The Nigerian Navy operates from its facilities in Warri.

The 61 Nigerian Air force Detachment also operates from its facilities in Jeddo, close to Warri.

==== Sports ====
Warri has an international stadium with a capacity of 30,000 which is the home of Warri Wolves football club, which has hosted two editions of the African Women Football Championship in 2002 and 2006 respectively and was in contention as one of the venues to be used for the FIFA Under-17 World Cup in Nigeria in 2009. The stadium was used to host the African Youth Athletics Championship (AYAC) in 2013.

Warri Wolves, a professional football team based in Warri plays in the Nigeria National League. Their prominent former players include Best Ogedegbe, Wilson Oruma, Efe Ambrose, Victor Ikpeba and Ekigho Ehiosun.

=== Manufacturing and raw materials ===
The economic base of the city lies in the presence of a refinery and other oil and gas companies. Also, there is the steel company, Delta Steel Company, which is located in Ovwian–Aladja area of Udu. The Beta Glass Plant is located nearby, outside the town of Ughelli, where the land is rich in silica and silicates, raw materials required for the manufacture of glass, ceramics and cement. The Transcorp Power Distribution, one of Nigeria's power generating stations, is also located at Ughelli, which is just 15 minutes away by car.

== Transport ==
=== Rail ===
In 1991, construction started on a standard gauge railway from the steel mills at Ajaokuta to the port of Warri, about 275 km away. By 2006, the standard gauge lines had reached 329 km in length, the final 27 km Warri section has been completed. In 2010, work recommenced to complete the final section to Warri. The rail line was officially inaugurated in September 2020 with the terminal at Udu.

=== Road ===
Major road networks within Warri Metropolis has been improved upon by the state government to improve the image of the city. Transportation within the city is mainly by bus and tricycle. The federal government has completed the Warri-Benin Road road expansion project and major parts of the East-West Road Project which will connect Warri-Uyo.

=== Air ===
There are several helipads in oil company yards, like Shell yard Ogunu and in Escavos and Focados. There is a general passenger airport at the Osubi area.

=== Sea ===
Movement of goods by sea is through the Nigerian Ports Authority (Delta Ports) at which is mainly for export and import of goods by major companies. Also located on the main Warri riverside are markets and jetties used by local traders, which act as a transit point for local transport and trade. There are local boats that are used for moving from one location to another.

== Educational institutions ==
=== Primary schools ===
Primary schools in Warri include:

- Alderstown School for the Deaf

=== Secondary schools ===
Secondary schools include:

- Dore Numa College, Warri
- Hussey College Warri

== Religion ==
Warri is also known for its proliferation of churches, and has several religious figures such as Ayo Oritsejafor of the Word of Life Bible Church, and Jeremiah Omoto Fufeyin.

== Tourism ==
There are various tourist sites to visit while in Warri:

- Red Mangrove swamp
- Falcorp Mangrove Park / Mini Zoo, Ijala, Behind Warri Refinery.
- Warri Township Stadium
- Shell club, Ogunu
- Warri Port, Ugbuwangue, Warri

== Notable people ==
- Charity Adule, footballer
- Demas Akpore, academic and politician
- Nneka Egbuna, a singer based in Germany
- Erigga, musician
- Jeremiah Omoto Fufeyin - minister and prophet
- Emomotimi Guwor Speaker Delta State House Of Assembly
- Emmanuel Olisadebe, footballer
- Nedum Onuoha, footballer
- Ayo Oritsejafor, former CAN President
- Kingsley Otuaro former deputy governor of Delta State
- Ozoz Sokoh, food writer

== See also ==
- Abraka
- Asaba, Delta
- Agbassa
- Delta State
- Effurun
- Eku, Delta
- Ughelli
- Railway stations in Nigeria
