= Isiokolo =

- Town
- Interactive map of Isiokolo
- Country: Nigeria
- State: Delta State
- LGA: Ethiope East

Isiokolo (also known as Otorho 'r' agbon) is a town in the Ethiope East local government area of Delta State in Nigeria.

It is the headquarters of the Ethiope East local government area of Delta State, and also the Traditional Headquarters of Agbon Kingdom, which houses the ultra-modern palace of the Ovie of Agbon Kingdom
