= Effurun =

- Town
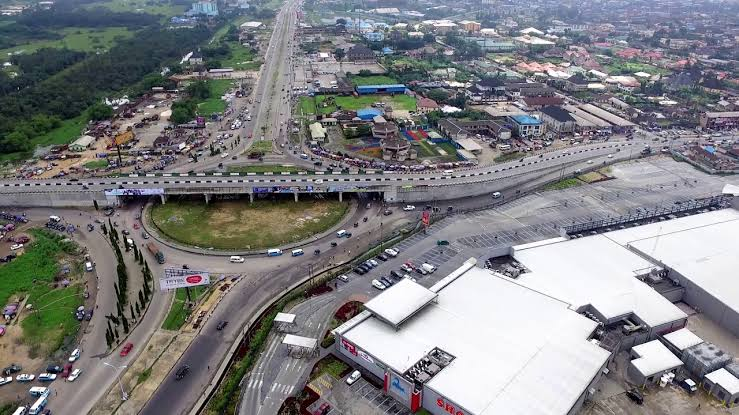
- Effurun
- Nicknames: Effa, Waffi, Warri
- Location in Nigeria
- Coordinates: 5°31′N 5°45′E
- Country: Nigeria
- State: Delta State
- Local Government: Uvwie LGA

Government
  - Executive Governor: Sheriff Oborevwori

Demographics
  - Ethnicities: Urhobo
  - Languages: Pidgin English, Urhobo
  - Religions: 90% Christianity; 9% Traditional African religions 1% Islam
- Time zone: UTC+1:00 (WAT)

Effurun is a town and the headquarters of Uvwie Local Government Area in Delta State, Nigeria. It is an Urban centre, densely populated with different infrastructural development. it borders its twin city Warri, also serves as an entrance to Warri.

It shares boundaries with Agbarho to the east, Udu to the south, Ughelli South to the south east, Okpe to the north and Warri to the west. Due to her proximity with Warri, rapid population growth and several road network linking both towns and her environs, it formed a conurbation collectively referred to as Warri by people from other parts of the state and Nigeria at large, though each towns in "Warri conurbation" are under different traditional and political authorities.

Effurun is one of the major hubs of economic activities and businesses in Delta State.

The city herself is indigenous to the Uvwie people, a distinct subgroup of the Urhobo.

Its inhabitants are predominantly Christians of different denominations, and some practice a mixture of African traditional religion most notably the Igbe religion common amongst Urhobos like most of Southern Nigeria. The city along with Warri and environs are known nationwide for her unique Pidgin English.

== Climate ==
In Effurun, the wet season is overcast and warm, the dry season is hot and partly cloudy, and it is oppressive year round.

== Higher institutions ==
- Petroleum Training Institute (PTI) at Effurun, Delta State
- Federal University of Petroleum Resources Effurun (FUPRE) at Ugbomro, Effurun, Delta State
