= Ukodo =

Yam and plantain dish of the Urhobo

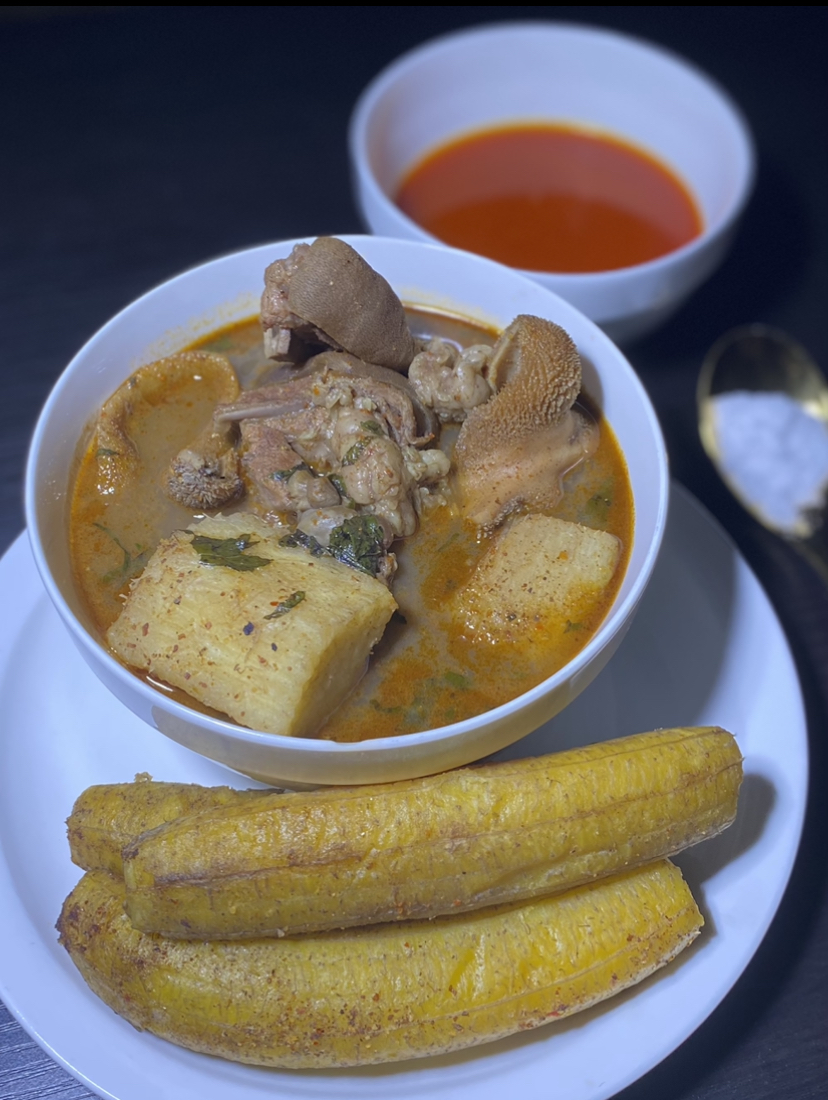
Ukodo

Ukodo is a yam and unripe plantain dish of the Urhobo people of Nigeria. It is essentially a pottage, a soup of meat and vegetable with its base as the Nigerian pepper soup. It is usually used for marriage and burial ceremonies or as breakfast, particularly during the cold season.

It is sometimes cooked with lemon grass and potash. A poem by the Nigerian Chovwe Inisiagho-Ogbe describes both the ingredients and the process of cooking Ukodo in a light-hearted way.
