= Evwreni =

Evwreni is a town in Ughelli North Local Government Area of Delta State, Nigeria. It is an oil-producing area that has about 14 oil wells, with flow and compressor stations operated by Shell Petroleum Development Company of Nigeria.

It is 154.6 kilometres by road to Port Harcourt and 45.3 kilometres to Warri.

== The Evwreni Kingdom ==
Evwreni is a cultural unit of the Urhobo ethnic nationality, the Ovie of Evwreni Kingdom is the traditional leader of the clan which is made up of four major communities (also referred to as quarters), they include Urevwe, Okpawha, Uneni and Unenurhie, the other minor quarters are Erhurigbedi, Ivwrorode and Iwrorha.

== Communal Crisis ==
Disputes over the distribution of oil royalties and agitations, mainly from the Unenurhie community, to be recognized as a separate kingdom, has resulted in recurrent communal clashes. On 20 January 2000, the traditional ruler of Evwreni, Ovie Owin Kumani was reportedly dethroned and murdered by angry youths that were dissatisfied over an alleged embezzlement of royalties paid to the community by the Shell Petroleum Development Company.

== Natural Resources ==
Evwreni is an oil-rich community that is host to about 14 oil wells that feed the Evwreni flowstation that was commissioned in 1967. This onshore facility is equipped with one stabilization train and has a total installed capacity of 30,000 barrels of oil per day.
