= Abraka =

- Town
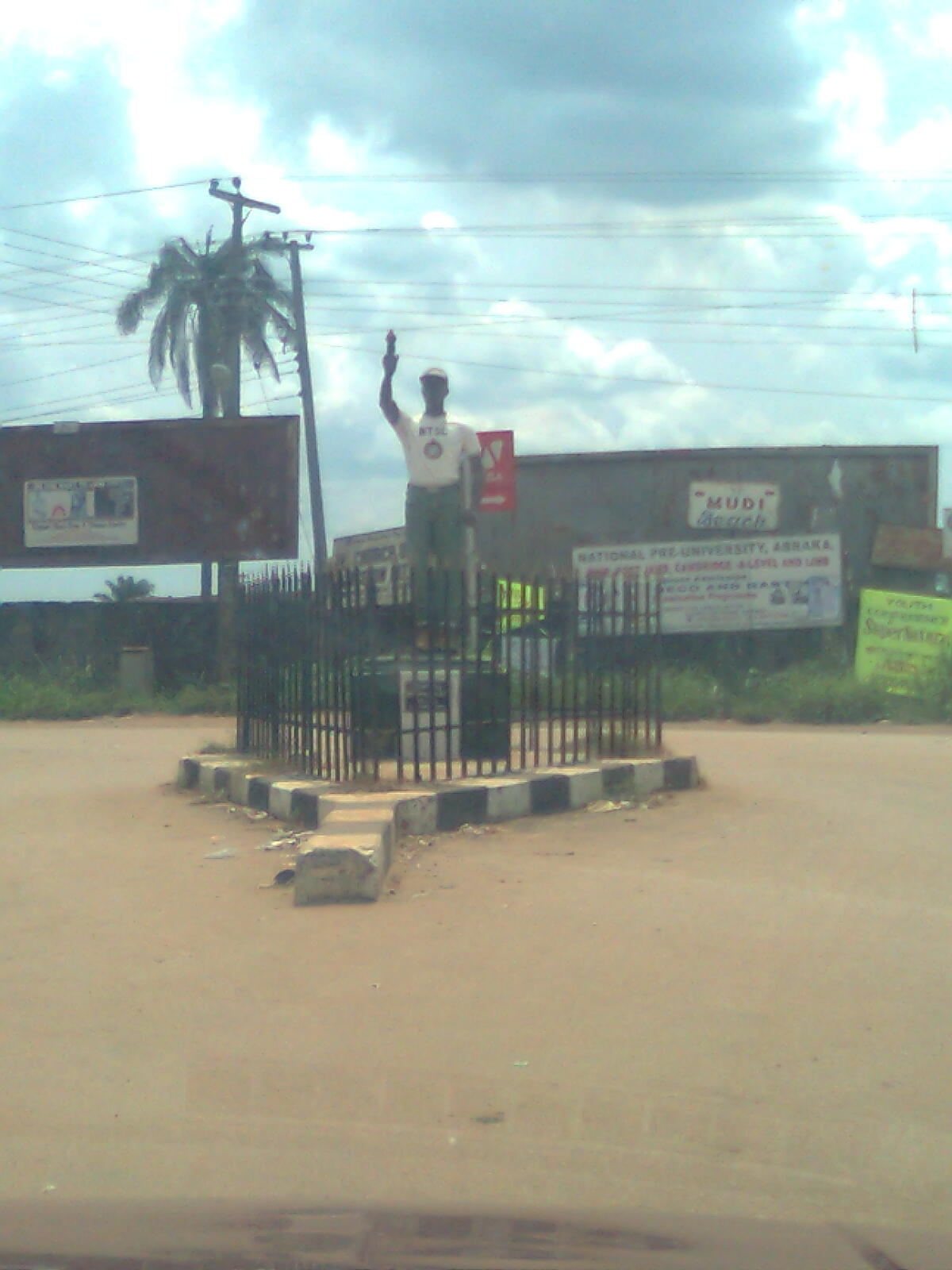
- Roundabout in Abraka Town
- Nickname: University Town
- Interactive map of Abraka
- Country: Nigeria
- State: Delta State
- LGA: Ethiope East

Government
  - Type: Monarchy
  - Governor: Sheriff Oborevwori
  - Ovie King: H.R.M (A.V.M) Avwaeke I (Ovie Of Umiagwa-Abraka Kingdom) H.R.M Majoroh, Ojeta II (Ovie Of Oruarive-Abraka Kingdom)

Population
  - Religion: Christianity; Igbe Religion; African Traditional Religion
- Time zone: UTC+1 (WAT)
- Website: web.archive.org/web/20100529180918/; www.abrakaonline.com:80

Abraka, is a university town in Delta state, Nigeria. It is also home to two of the main 24 Urhobo kingdoms. It is mostly known as a university town and has the main campus of the Delta State University located there. Abraka town is a favourite destination for domestic and international tourists. The Abraka beach is famous for its natural flowing spring water, and has sports recreational facilities for outdoor activities like canoeing, fishing, swimming, barbecue and picnicking.

== The Evolution of Delta State University ==
Abraka's transformation into a major educational hub began in the 1990s. What is now Delta State University (DELSU) began as the Abraka Campus of the former Bendel State University (now Ambrose Alli University, Ekpoma).

With the creation of Delta State in 1991, the Abraka campus was excised and established in 1992 as a separate institution named Delta State University, Abraka. It started with four faculties: Arts, Education, Science, and Social Sciences.

Over the years, the university has expanded significantly, adding faculties like Law, Engineering, Agriculture, Management Sciences, and Health Sciences. It now operates multiple campuses within Abraka, with the main campus located at Site III along the Abraka Warri highway. DELSU has become the economic and intellectual heart of the Abraka community, attracting students and scholars from across Nigeria and beyond.

== Climate ==
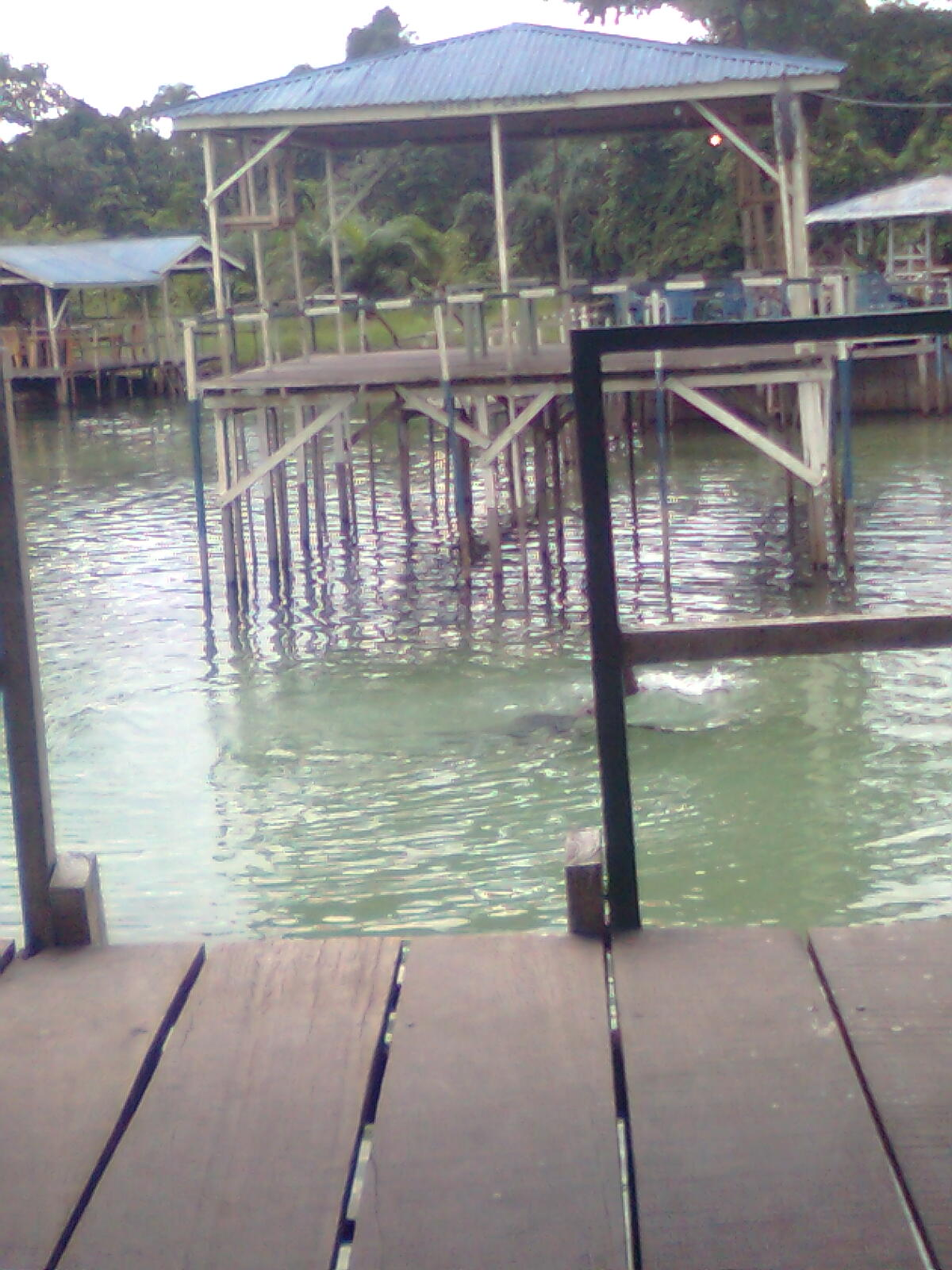

Abraka has a tropical wet and dry climate, with a lengthy wet season and relatively constant temperatures throughout the course of the year. Abraka's wet season runs from March through October, though August sees somewhat of a lull in precipitation. This lull nearly divides the wet season into two different wet seasons. The remaining months forms the city's dry season. Like a good portion of West Africa, Abraka experiences the harmattan between the months of November and February.

== Education ==
Abraka is home to the prestigious Delta State University, Abraka. The Delta State University, was established in the year 1992, with its main campus at Abraka and a campus at Anwai, Asaba. With the 1995 Amended Edict, a new campus was established at Oleh. The University runs a multi-campus system with three campuses within a distance of about 200 km apart. Currently, with a student population of about 36,000 (in the 2007/08 session), the University offers a range of programmes from the full-time certificate, diploma and degree programmes to part-time evening and weekend degree programmes. The University offers post-graduate studies up to a doctoral level. A staff/student counselling centre, an e-learning centre, student accommodation and sporting facilities amidst others are available support services.

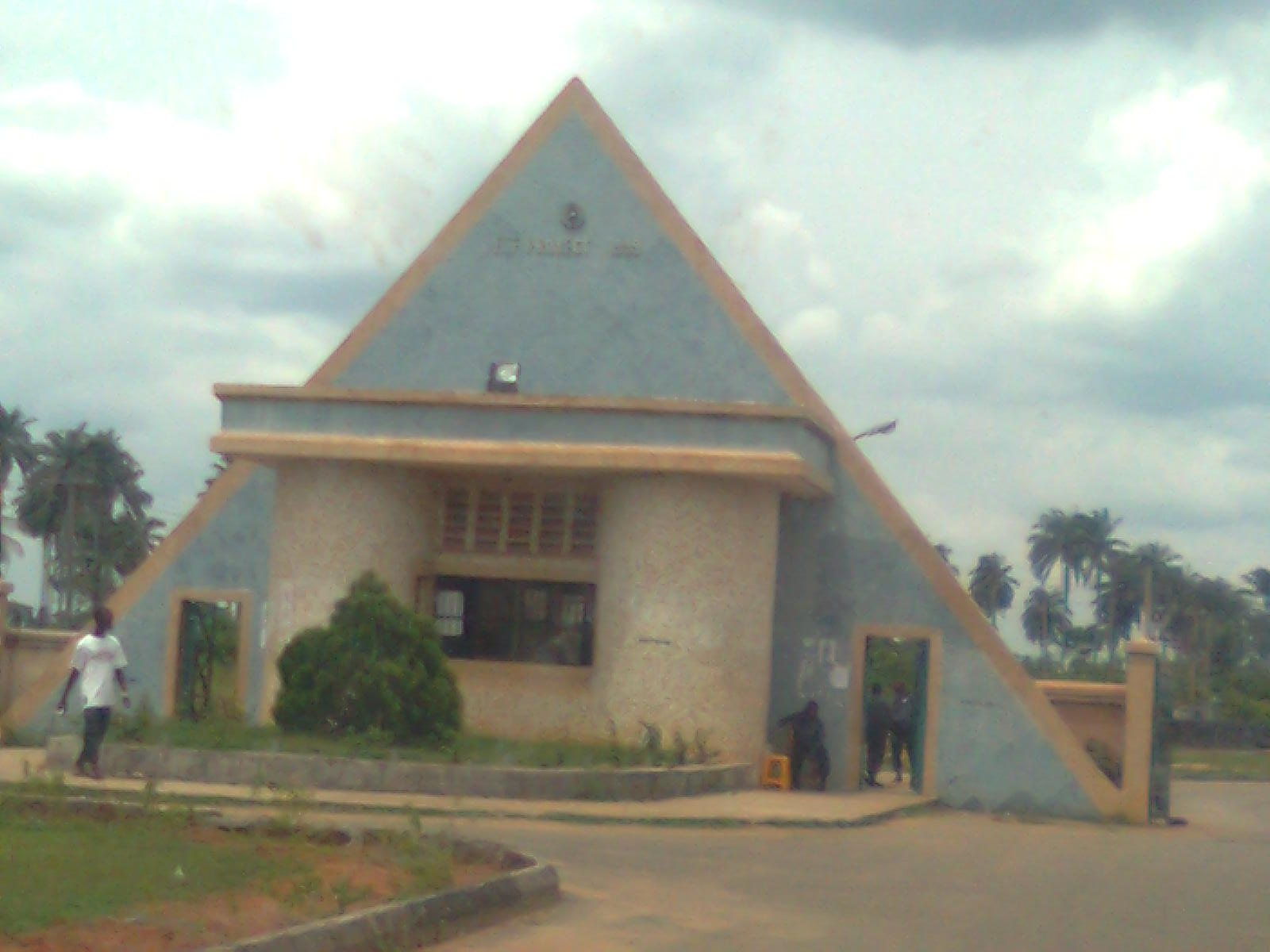
DELSU Abraka Main Campus Gate

== Tourism ==
Abraka is a destination for domestic and international tourism. It attracts numerous tourists. Abraka's Rivotel is famous for its natural flowing spring water, and has recreational facilities for outdoor activities like canoeing, fishing, swimming, barbecue. Abraka Turf and Country Club nestles at the Delta State University town of Abraka.

== Notable people ==
- Chief Great Ovedje Ogboru
- Chief Justus Esiri – Nollywood actor
- Sydney Esiri (Dr Sid) – Musician
