= Midwest Democratic Front =

Nigerian political party

The Midwest Democratic Front was a small political party from Nigeria's Midwest region; encompassing present day Edo and Delta states. The party was one of the various small parties that forged alliances with the dominant parties in Nigeria's first republic, such as the Action Group, the Northern People's Congress, NEPU and the National Council of Nigeria and the Cameroons.
