= Ovie =

List of people with the same name

listen

Ovie is a given name, nickname and surname.

== People with the surname ==
- Patrick Ovie (born 1978), Nigerian footballer

== People with the given name or nickname ==
- Alexander Ovechkin (born 1985), Russian ice hockey player known as Ovie
- Ovie Alston (1905–1989), American jazz trumpeter, vocalist and bandleader
- Ovie Carter (born 1946), American newspaper photographer
- Ovie Ejaria (born 1997), English footballer
- O. C. Fisher (1903–1994; Ovie Clark Fisher), American politician, attorney and author
- Ovie Mughelli (born 1980), American former National Football League fullback
- Ovie Oghoufo (born 2000), American college football defensive end
- Ovie Omo-Agege (born 1963), Nigerian lawyer and politician
- Ovie Scurlock (1918–2016), American horse racing jockey
- Ovie Soko (born 1991), British basketball player and 2019 Love Island reality show contestant

== Fictional characters ==
- Ovie, a recurring character in Tales of Wells Fargo, an American Western television series

== See also ==
- Ovey
