= Urhobo people =

Ethnic group of Niger Delta, Nigeria

Urhobo people Ihwo r' Urhobo
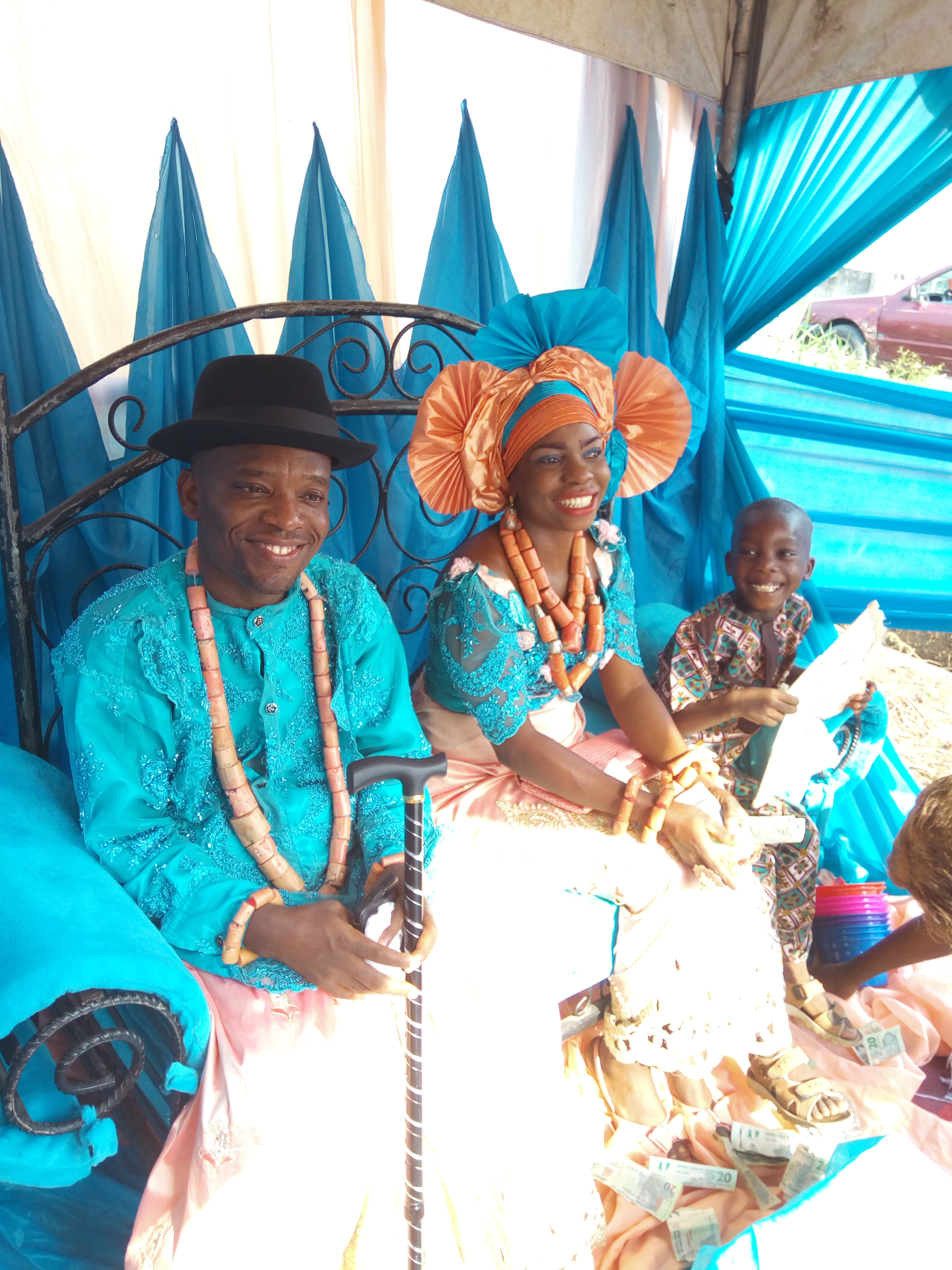
- An Urhobo couple at a wedding

Total population
- c. 7 million (est.)

Languages
- Urhobo language / Agbarho; Ughievwen; Okpe; Uvwie; Udu; Isoko; Erowha; English; Nigerian pidgin

Religion
- Christianity 93%; Igbe religion 3%; Others 4%

Related ethnic groups
- Isoko, Benin, Esan, Afemai, Ijaw, Itsekiri

The Urhobos are a people located in southern Nigeria, near the northwestern Niger Delta. They are the major ethnic group in Delta State. The people of this ethnic group speak the Urhobo language. Their population is approximately 7 million.

The Urhobo people live in a territory bounded by latitudes 6° and 5°, 15° North and Longitudes 5°, 40° and 6°, 25° East in the Delta and Bayelsa States of Nigeria. Their neighbors are the Isoko to the southeast, the Itsekiri and Ijaw to the west, the Edo people to the north, the Ijaw to the south and the Ukwuani people to the northeast.

== History ==
The Ughelli and Agbon Kingdoms are the oldest kingdoms in Urhobo land and can be traced to about the 14th century. Ughelli oral tradition has it that the great ancestor and founding father of Ughelli (Ughene) was the second son of Oghwoghwa, a prince from Benin Kingdom. The Okpe Kingdom is also one of the twenty four kingdoms in Urhobo land. It has been in existence since before the arrival of the Portuguese in the 15th century, but was formally established in the 17th century. The Okpe people are known to have migrated to found the present day Sapele and the Orodje of Okpe still exercises authority over the land of Sapele.

== Indigenous government and politics ==
The people are organized either by elders or by the wealthy.

Urhobo indigenous governments have an Ovie (king), who is the highest political figure. The Ovie is the symbol of the kingdoms' culture and royal predecessors. His Councillors consist of the Otota (speaker), and the Ohonvwore or Okakuro, addressed collectively as Ilorogun (singular: Olorogun). Other title holders are the executioners (Ikoikpokpo), and the warriors (Ogbu). Other political titles are specific to the different kingdoms. The judicial system places a clear distinction between civil and criminal offenses.

The queen is called Ovieya, and her children are known as Ọmọ Ovie. Presently, this name is given to children without royal heritage. Some Urhobo cultural divisions adopted titles other than Ovie. For example, the Okpe call their traditional ruler Orodje, Okere-Urhobo call theirs Orosuen, Agbarho uses Osuivie, Orogun use Okpara-Uku" (mainly due to their proximity with Ukwuani people), and the Urhobos in the Olomu Kingdom call their king Ohworode. Some southern Urhobo clans and communities also practice the Odio system, which is widespread in the Isoko region.

== Location ==
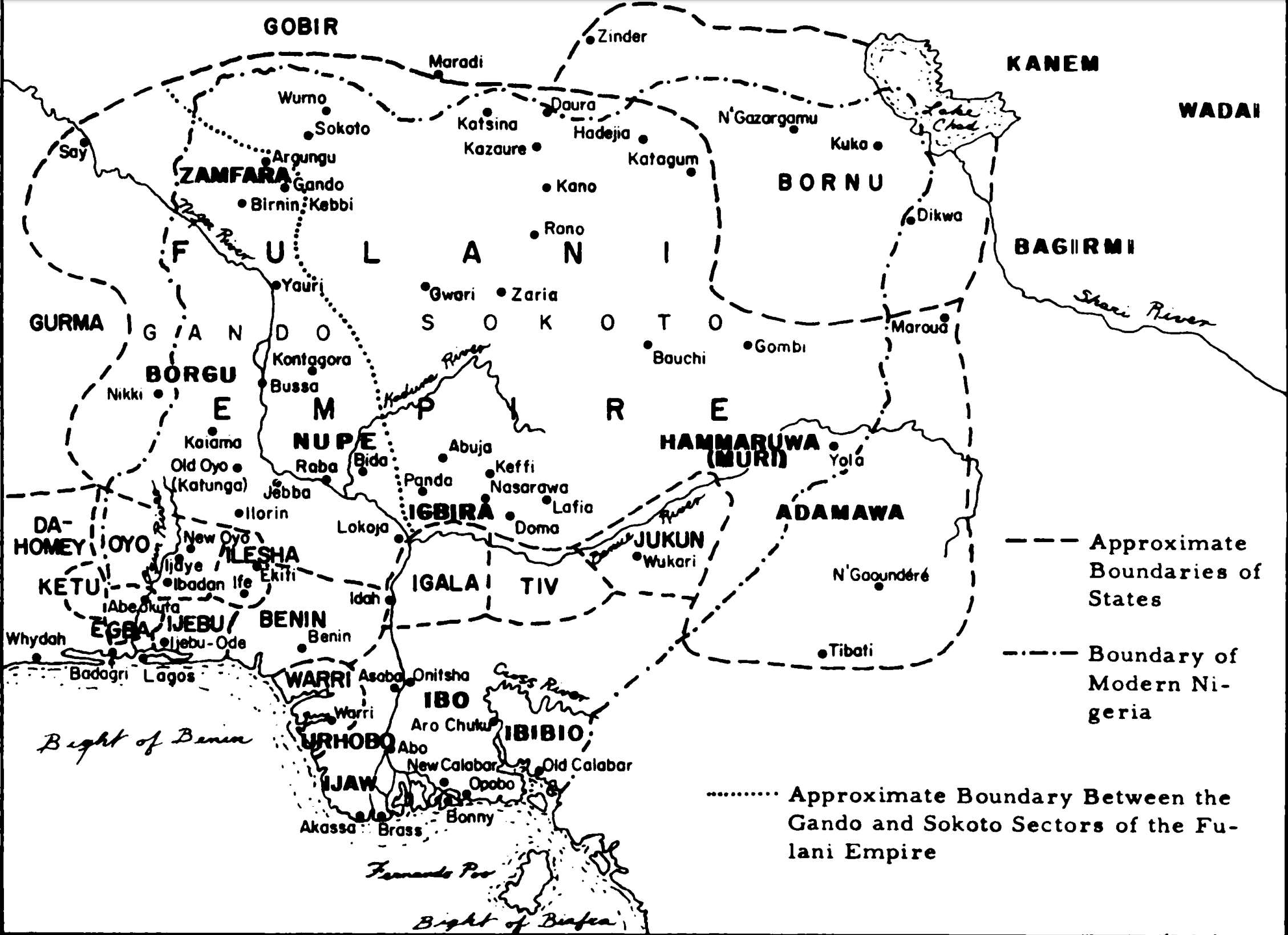
19th-century map of Nigeria; the Urhobo are marked "URHOBO".

Urhobo territory consists of evergreen forests with many oil palm trees. The territory is covered by a network of streams, whose volume and flow are directly affected by the seasons. The wet season is traditionally from April to October, while the dry season ranges from November to March.

Urhobo is geographically located within the Atlantic forest belt that spans from Senegal to Angola in Africa. Before the arrival of the Portuguese in the late 15th century, this area was known for its untouched and pristine environment, where the forest peoples lived without outside influences and developed their own forms of civilization.

This forest belt of western Africa was reached neither by ancient Christian influences, which had a large foothold in North Africa, nor by Islamic forces that came as far south as Hausa land by the eleventh century. While East Africa and even Central Africa were touched by Asian and Arab influences from across the Indian Ocean, as the amalgam of Swahili language bears out, no similar trans-Atlantic influences breached the forest belt until the Portuguese arrival in the late fifteenth century."

— Professor Peter Palmer Ekeh, founder of the Urhobo Historical Society, Studies in Urhobo Culture

The majority of the Urhobo people reside in the southwestern states of Delta and Bayelsa in Nigeria, collectively known as the Niger Delta. Ofoni is an Urhobo community located in the Sagbama Local Government Area of Bayelsa State. It is approximately 40 kilometers by water from Sagbama.

Many Urhobos inhabit both small and major cities across regions and local government areas, including Ughelli, Warri, Abraka, Orerokpe, and Sapele. Notable Urhobo towns and cities include Effurun, Aladja, Ovwian, Orerokpe, Eku, Oghara, Evwreni, Agbara-Otor, Okpara Inland, Egini, Kokori, Olomu, Kiagbodo, Isiokoro, Jesse, Ogharaefe, Effurun-Otor, Ewu, Jeremi, Emadadja, Okwagbe, Ovu, Orogun, Otor-Udu, Ekpan, Jeddo, Uwheru, and Orhuwhorun, among others.

The following are local government areas where Urhobo traditional homes are located in Delta, Bayelsa and Edo State:

- Ethiope East
- Ethiope West
- Okpe
- Sapele
- Udu
- Ughelli North
- Ughelli South
- Uvwie
- Warri South
- Patani
- Sagbama (in Bayelsa State )
- Ikpoba Okha (in Edo State )
- Orhionmwon (in Edo state ))

Urhobos also have large settlements in Ore, Owo and Okitipupa in Ondo State, Ajegunle and other places in Lagos State, Oro in Kwara State, as well as other clusters across Nigeria.

== Culture ==
=== Okpako Orere ===
Based on gerontocracy, the Urhobos are governed by the eldest man in each Urhobo community locally known as the "Okpako Orere".

The Okpako Orere is the eldest surviving male in each Urhobo community, who is also considered as the indigenous political head of the community. He is called Okpako Ewo by Isoko-speaking clans, and he is also referred to as Okaroro by Urhobo-speaking clans. His position is succeeded to on the basis of gerontocracy when he dies, and the next most senior elder of the community takes his office. Among the Urhobo, names often reflect religious beliefs; exampls includes Ogheneme , meaning ''God has done it'', Oghenetega, meaning ''God is worthy'', Eguono meaning "Endurance or Love'' ; Edeki which means ''Market day'' which is a unisex name Oghenefejiro which means ''God is Praiseworthy'', Edojah which means ''heart of the multitude, son of a lovable or peaceful man, day of challenge'', Ejaita which means ''Let them say''.

Festivals

The Urhobos live very close to, and sometimes in boats on the Niger river. Most of their histories, mythologies, and philosophies are water-related. Annual fishing festivals include masquerades, fishing, swimming contests, and dancing, and have become part of the Urhobo heritage. An annual two-day festival called Ohworu takes place in Evwreni, in the southern part of the Urhobo area. During this festival the Ohworhu water spirit and the Eravwe Oganga are displayed.

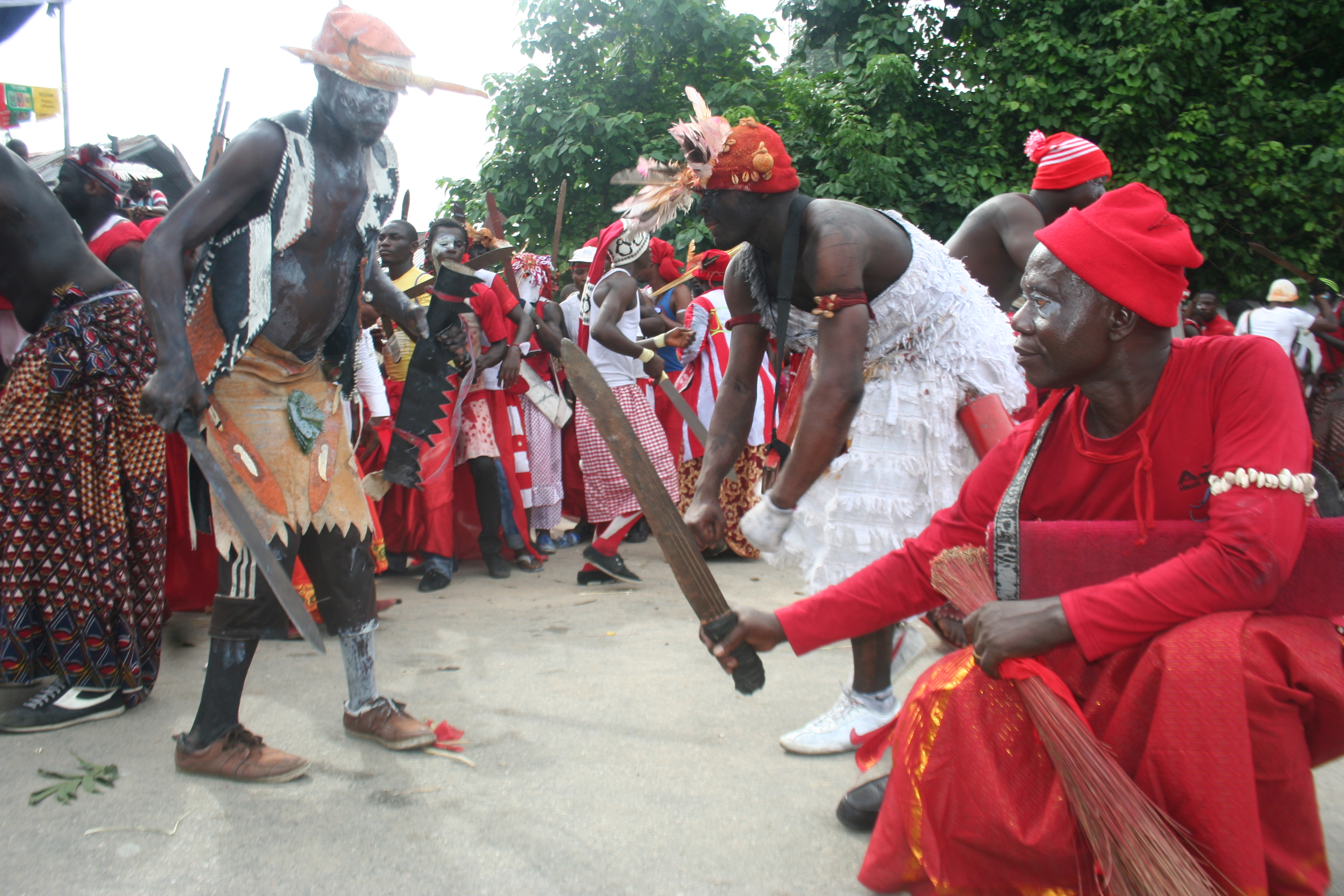
Victory dance of the Urhobo

=== Marriage ===
Marriage in Urhobo culture requires prayers to the ancestors (Erivwin), and God (Oghene). The marriage ritual, known as Udi Arhovwaje, takes place in the ancestral home of the bride or a patrilineal relation of the bride.

The groom goes with his relatives and friends to the bride's father's home, bringing gifts of drinks, salt, kola nuts and occasionally food requested by the bride's family. Formal approval for marriage is given by the bride's parents, or whoever is representing the bride's family, as are the traditional rites of pouring gin, brought by the groom, as a tribute to the father's ancestors in order to bless them with health, children and wealth. After this marriage rite the husband can claim a refund of the money (bride price) should the marriage fail. It is believed that the ancestors witness the marriage, and only the physical body that is sent to the husband in the marriage, the Erhi (spirit double), remains in the family home. This explains why a woman is brought back to be buried in her family home when she dies.

In the ancestral home of the man, the wife is welcomed into the family by the eldest member. She is expected to confess all of her love affairs during and after her betrothal to her husband, if any, and is then absolved of them. She becomes a full member of her husband's family after this ritual, and is assumed to be protected by the supernatural (Erivwin). This ritual symbolizes an agreement between the wife and the Erivwin.

If the wife later becomes unfaithful, it is believed that she will be punished by the Erivwin – this could be the reason Urhobo women have an enduring reputation as loyal and faithful wives.

=== Urhobo ===
Urhobo has always been a non-homogeneous linguistic entity. Since time immemorial, Urhobo has been colored by variation that occur on various levels. These variations manifest in the various Urhobo kingdoms. The Urhobo nation is made up of twenty-four sub-groups, including the largest, Okpe.

=== Urhobo calendar ===
The Urhobo Okpo (week) is made up of four days, based on regulated market cycles, religious worship, marriages and other community life. The four days are Edewo, Ediruo, Eduhre and Edebi. Edewo and Eduhre are sacred days to divinities, spirits and ancestors. Most markets are held on these days. On Edewo, ancestors are venerated. Most traditional religious rituals are held on Eduhre.

Spirits are believed to be active in the farmlands and forests on Edewo and Eduhre. Therefore, farmers rarely work on these days so as not to disturb the spirits.

Urhobo months are called Emeravwe and are made up of 28 days. Most of the annual festivals are held during the months of Asa, Eghwre, Orianre and Urhiori. These are the months of harvest, when farming activity is at its lowest, so most farmers are free to partake. These are also months to honor the gods of the land, as well as spiritual forces that brought a good harvest.

== Food ==
The very popular Banga Soup also known as Amiedi originated from the Urhobo tribe. It is a soup made from palm kernel. This prestigious soup can be eaten with Starch (Usi), made from the cassava plant. It is heated and stirred into a thick mound with added palm oil to give the starch its unique orange-yellow colour. Banga soup and starch have gone on to become a continental favourite. Other notable delicacies from the Urhobo tribe are Ukhodo (a yam and unripe plantain dish prepared with either beef, poultry, or fish, and spiced with lemon grass and potash), Oghwevwri (Oghwo soup), and starch (Usi) also have their origins from the Urhobo tribe. Oghwevwri (Oghwo Soup) is composed of smoked or dried fish, bush meat, unique spices, potash and oil palm juice. Other culinary delicacies include Iriboto, Iriboerhanrhe,Ugbagba and Okpariku.

== Religion ==
The main focus of Urhobo traditional religion is the adoration of "Ọghẹnẹ" (Almighty God), the supreme deity, and recognition of Edjo and Erhan (divinities). Some of these divinities could be regarded as personified attributes of Ọghẹnẹ. The Urhobo also worship God with Orhen (white chalk). If an Urhobo feels oppressed by someone, he appeals to Ọghẹnẹ, who he believes to be an impartial judge, to adjudicate between him and his opponent. Oghene is the fundamental factor and manifestation of all divinities. Urhobo divinities can be classified into four main categories, which probably coincide with historical development. These categories are Guardian divinities, War divinities, Prosperity divinities and Fertility and Ethical divinities.

Erivwin, which is the cult of ancestors and predecessors (Esemo and Iniemo), is another important element. The dead are believed to be living, and looked upon as active members who watch over the affairs of their family. Urhobos believe in the duality of man, i.e., that man consists of two beings: physical body (Ugboma) and spiritual body (Erhi).

It is the Erhi that declares man's destiny and controls the self-realization of man's destiny before he incarnates into the world. Erhi also controls the overall well-being (Ufuoma) of the man. Ọghẹnẹ is like a monarch who sets his seal on the path of destiny.

In the spirit world, Erivwin, man's destiny is ratified and sealed. In the final journey of the Erhi, after transition, the Urhobo believe the physical body, Ugboma, decays while the Ehri is indestructible and joins the ancestors in Erivwin. The elaborate and symbolic burial rites are meant to prepare the departed Erhi for happy re-union with the ancestors.

Despite this age-old and complex belief system, the influence of western civilization and Christianity is fast becoming an acceptable religion in most Urhobo communities. Many belong to Catholic and new evangelical denominations.

Epha divination, similar to the Yoruba Ifá and practiced by many West African ethnic groups, is practiced with strings of cowries. There are 1,261 ejo (deities), including the one-handed, one-legged mirror-holding whirlwind-god Aziza.

== Notable people ==
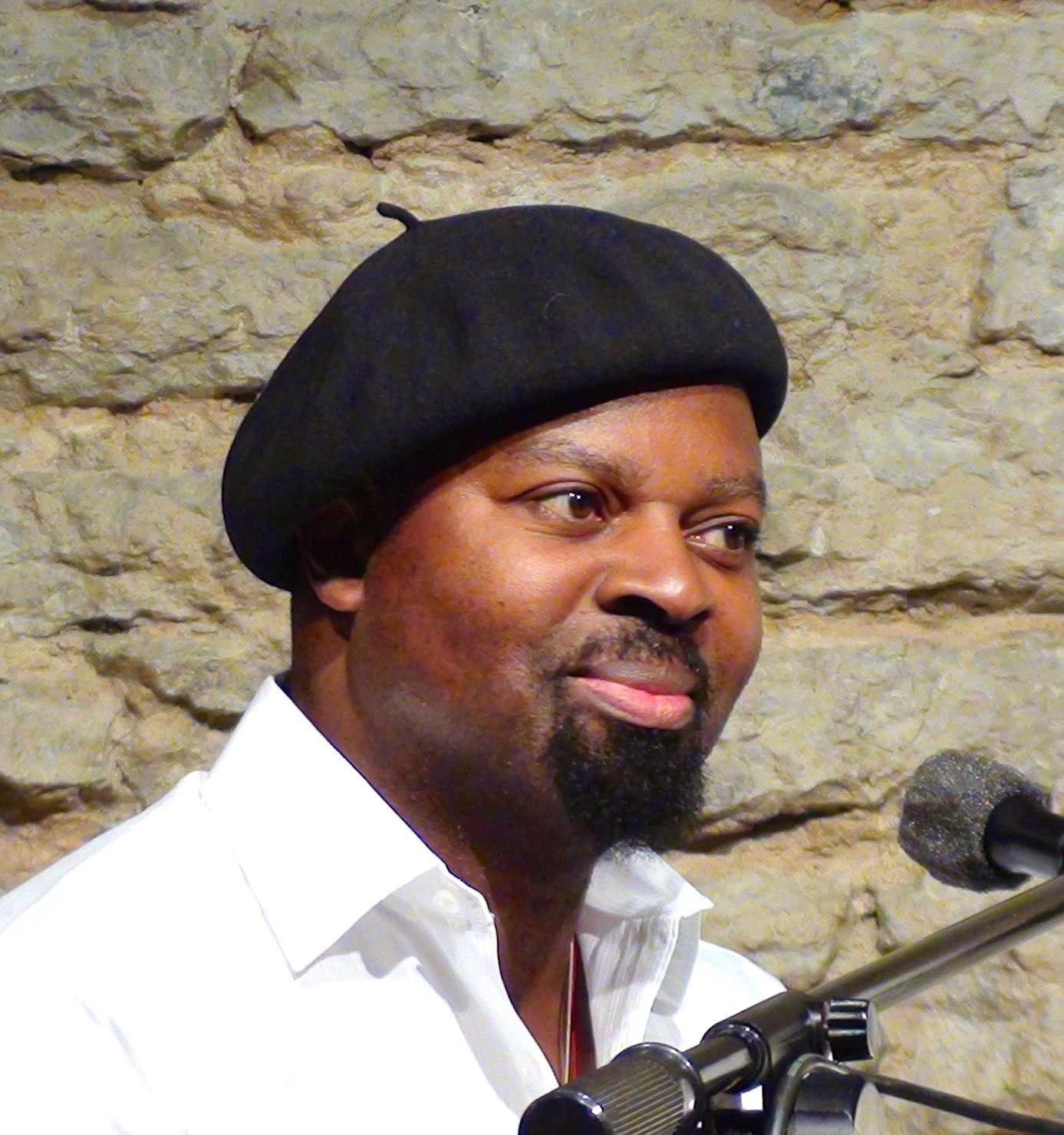
Author Ben Okri

- Samuel Jereton Mariere First Governor of Mid-Western Region of Nigeria
- Chief James Efa Edjeren Nigerian Educator, Administrator and Politician
- Ufuoma McDermott, Nigerian actress and model
- Ufuoma Onobrakpeya Nigerian artist
- Fred Aghogho Brume, senator and industrialist
- David Dafinone, Accountant, politician
- Richard Mofe Damijo, actor and politician
- Harris Eghagha, career soldier and diplomat
- M. G. Ejaife, Urhobo nationalist, first republic Senator and the first principal of Urhobo College
- David Ejoor, retired Nigerian army and governor of the now-defunct Mid-Western Region
- Justus Esiri, actor
- Mabel Evwierhoma, Professor of Theatre Arts, University of Abuja
- Felix Ibru, Nigerian architect, senator and governor
- Michael Ibru, Nigerian pioneer industrialist
- Akpomudiago Odje, Senior Advocate and Officer of Nigeria
- Tanure Ojaide, poet and writer
- Blessing Okagbare, IAAC silver medalist and Olympic bronze medalist
- Isidore Okpewho, scholar and novelist
- Ben Okri, poet and novelist
- Bruce Onobrakpeya, visual artist, sculptor and painter
- Gamaliel Onosode, administrator and politician
- Igho Sanomi, businessman
- Onigu Otite, Professor of Sociology (retired)
- James Ibori, Former Governor of Delta state (1999–2007)
- Adego Erhiawarie Eferakeya Nigerian Politician
- Akpor Pius Ewherido Nigerian Politician
- Ovie Omo-Agege Deputy Senate President of the Federal republic of Nigeria
- Fejiro Okiomah American football player
- Igosave, comedian
- Sheriff Oborevwori, Governor of Delta state
- Gideon Meriodere Urhobo, Founder of God's Kingdom Society,
- Emuoboh Ken Gbagi, Nigerian businessman, politician and community leader

== See also ==
- Agbassa
- Warri Crisis
