= Ughelli =

Ughelli Kingdom
- Town
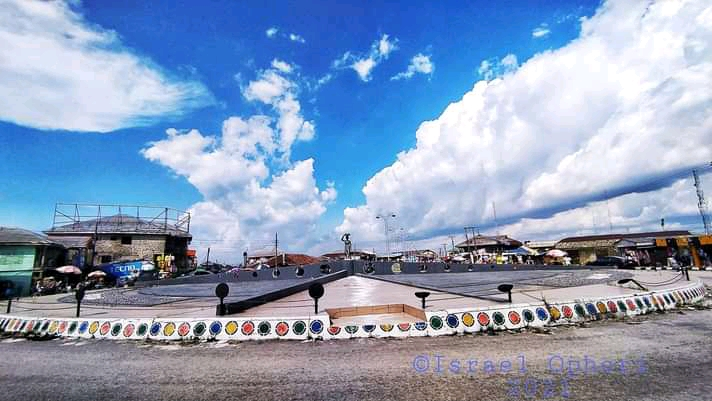
- Ughelli

- Location in Nigeria
- Coordinates: 5°30′N 5°59′E
- Country: Nigeria
- State: Delta State

Government
  - Type: Monarchy
  - OVIE (King): H.R.M Ajuwe, Oharisi III (JP)
- Time zone: UTC+1:00 (WAT)

Ughelli is a town in Delta State, Nigeria, and one of the 24 kingdoms that make up the Urhobo Nation. It also serves as the headquarters of Ughelli North local government area of Delta State. The city is indigenous to the Urhobo ethnic nationals, but there is a mixture of several other tribes from the country and abroad. It is an industrial and agricultural spot of Delta State.

Ughelli is in a central location in Delta State and a major town for the Urhobo Tribe, also one of the oldest kingdom in Delta State tracing back to the 14th and 15th century. The city of Ughelli is ruled by a hereditary ruler, known as Ovie. The king, Oharisi III, lives in the Ovie Palace, situated at Otovwodo-Ughelli.

== History ==
Ughelli oral tradition has it that the great ancestor and founding father of Ughelli ("Ughene"), is the second son of Oghwoghwa (a Prince from idu iodomigodo). As history has it, Oghwoghwa in search of his own kingdom first settlement was at Tarakiri and later left for Oviri Ogor (current site of Ogor Techinal College). Ughene later left Oviri Ogor and founded Ovwodoawanre (Old Settlement), before the present settlement headquarters at Otovwodo (traditional headquarters).

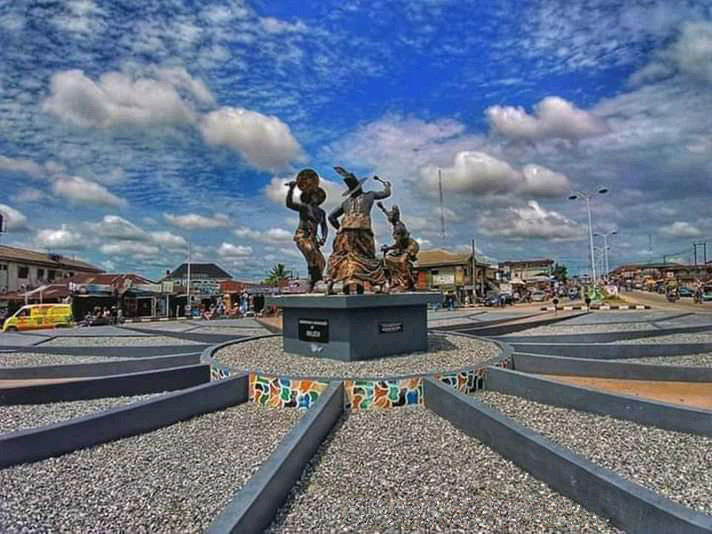
Otovwodo, Ughelli Kingdom

Ughelli has several schools, a general hospital, and a local government secretariat. The city is a link between Delta North and Delta South. The city has crude oil and gas reserves hence the presence of Shell Petroleum Development Company (SPDC).

Ughelli town is the administrative headquarters of Ughelli North Local Government Area of Delta State.

== Organization ==
Ughelli is organized as a local government area (LGA), with an elected Chairman and Councilors representing various wards. The local government administration is structured into departments responsible for functions such as finance, health, education, agriculture, and public works, each managed by departmental heads. In addition to governmental leadership, traditional institutions, including rulers and chiefs, play a role in governance. Committees may also be established to address specific local issues. Ughelli's governance structure operates under the Nigerian constitution and local government laws, following the country's multi-tiered system of federal, state, and local administration.

== Location ==
Ughelli's latitude and longitude coordinates are: 5.500187, 5.993834. It is a town in Southern Nigeria and the oldest kingdom of the 24 kingdoms of the Urhobo people. Ughelli is located in close proximity to the floodplains of the West Niger Delta river, and is surrounded by neighbouring communities and villages. Among these are Agbara-Otor, Agbaro, Ufuoma, Otokutu, Ogor.

== Climate ==
In Ughelli, the wet season is overcast and warm, the dry season is hot and partly cloudy, and it is oppressive year round.

== List of rulers of Ughelli Kingdom ==
Ruler	Start	End
Ughene	1440	1460
Inere	1461	1524
Evweresoso	1525	1567
Agwaide	1568	1594
Arhavwode	1595	1647
Adague	1648	1706
Useh	1707	1757
Akporoba	1758	1806
Esejuvevwo	1807	1855
Oghoghovwe I	1856	1884
Idjesa	1885	1916
Oharisi I	1917	1943
Oharisi II	1944	1980
Oghoghovwe II	1981	1991
Oharisi III	1992	Present

== Sports ==
Ughelli is gradually becoming a home of Sports after the foundation of Ughelli Rovers Football Club who compete in the Nigeria Nationwide League, the 3rd tier of Nigerian domestic football and play their home games at the Ughelli Township Stadium

== Notable people ==
- Efe Abogidi, basketball player
- 2 Milly Star, actor and musician
- Carter Efe, online streamer and comedian
- Efe Ajagba, boxer
- Gamaliel Onosode, technocrat, administrator and a former presidential candidate of the All Nigeria People's Party of Nigeria
- Ben Okri, poet and novelist
- Destalker (comedian), comedian and businessman
- Akpor Pius Ewherido, politician
- Festus Keyamo, lawyer, columnist, politician, and human rights activist
- Ese Brume, athlete
- Ella Onojuvwevwo, athlete
- Divine Oduduru, athlete
- Tega Odele, athlete
- Blessing Kaku, footballer
- Peter Omoduemuke, footballer
- Solomon Oboh, footballer
- Stephen Oru, politician
