= Ethiope East =

- LGA
- Interactive map of Ethiope East
- Country: Nigeria
- State: Delta State
- Headquarters: Isiokolo

Area
  - Total: 380 km^{2} (150 sq mi)

Population (2006)
  - Total: 200,792
  - Density: 530/km^{2} (1,400/sq mi)
- Time zone: UTC+1 (WAT)
- Postal code: 330

The Local Government Area of Ethiope East is located in the center of Delta State, Nigeria . It is close to Asagba, Asamagidi, Orerokpe, Ovwori, Orhokpokpor, Eruemukohwarien, Ekrokpe, Ughelli, and Agbasa.The local government of Ethiope East is home to three districts and 67 settlements. Agbon, Abraka, and Isiokolo are the districts in Ethiope East and Isiokolo is where the local government administration is headquartered.

Urhobo is the language spoken in Ethiope east. There are 73 settlements in Ethiope East, however they all contain the 67 villages that are located in this local government area.

It has an area of 380.00 km^{2} and a population of 200,792 persons according to the 2006 census.The postal code of the area is 330.
