= 2023 Nigerian Senate elections in Delta State =

Senate elections in Delta

2019 Nigerian Senate elections in Delta State
- 25 February 2023

All 3 Delta State seats in the Senate of Nigeria
	Majority party	Minority party
Party	APC	PDP
Last election	1	2
Seats before	2	1
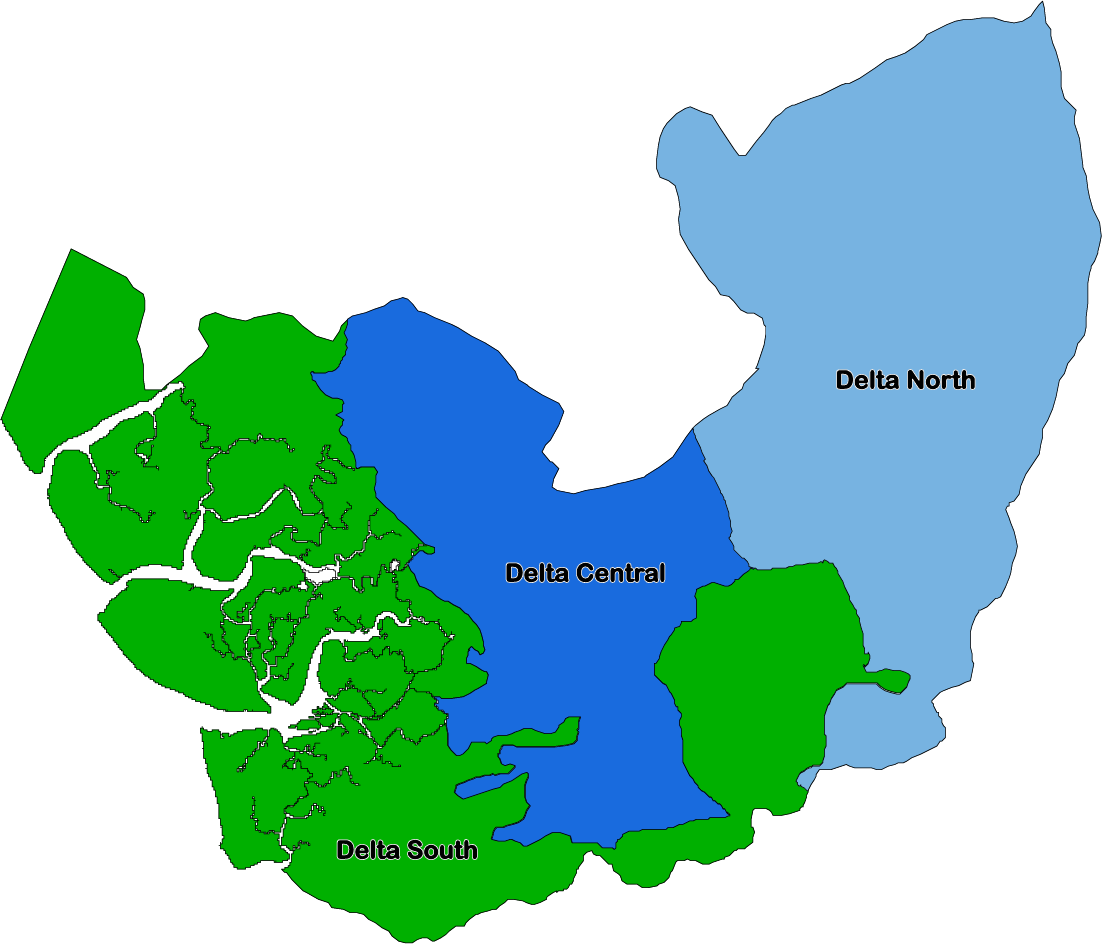
- APC incumbent retiring APC incumbent running for re-election PDP incumbent retiring

The 2023 Nigerian Senate elections in Delta State will be held on 25 February 2023, to elect the 3 federal Senators from Delta State, one from each of the state's three senatorial districts. The elections will coincide with the 2023 presidential election, as well as other elections to the Senate and elections to the House of Representatives; with state elections being held two weeks later. Primaries were held between 4 April and 9 June 2022.

== Background ==
In terms of the previous Senate elections, all three incumbent senators were re-elected: in the Central district, Ovie Omo-Agege (LP-turned-APC) held his seat for the APC with 51% of the vote; on the other hand, the PDP's Peter Nwaoboshi and James Manager won with 82% in the North district and 66% in the South district, respectively. These results were a part of a continuation of the PDP's control of the state as Governor Ifeanyi Okowa was re-elected with over 80% of the vote in the gubernatorial election and the party held its sizeable majority in the House of Assembly. However, the PDP did lose one House of Representatives seat to the APC and although the state was easily won by PDP presidential nominee Atiku Abubakar, it still swung towards Buhari compared to 2015 and had lower turnout.

At the start of the 2019–2023 term, Omo-Agege was elected Deputy President of the Senate. By the middle of the term, Omo-Agege had filed 20 bills compared to Nwaoboshi's and Manager's two bills each. However, Nwaoboshi was also high-profile due to his defection to the APC in June 2021 and his continued legal cases. Three major corruption scandals struck Nwaoboshi with the federal government filing three counts of false asset declaration against him in June 2019, the Niger Delta Development Commission accusing him of using front companies to defraud the Commission out of ₦3.6 billion in June 2020, and his continued trial on ₦322 million fraud and money laundering; the fraud trial ended in July 2022 with a seven-year prison sentence for Nwaoboshi but he stated his intent to appeal and feigned illness in attempt to avoid the sentence.

== Overview ==
Affiliation	Party		Total
Affiliation	APC	PDP	Total
Previous Election	1	2	3
Before Election	2	1	3
After Election	2	1	3

== Summary ==
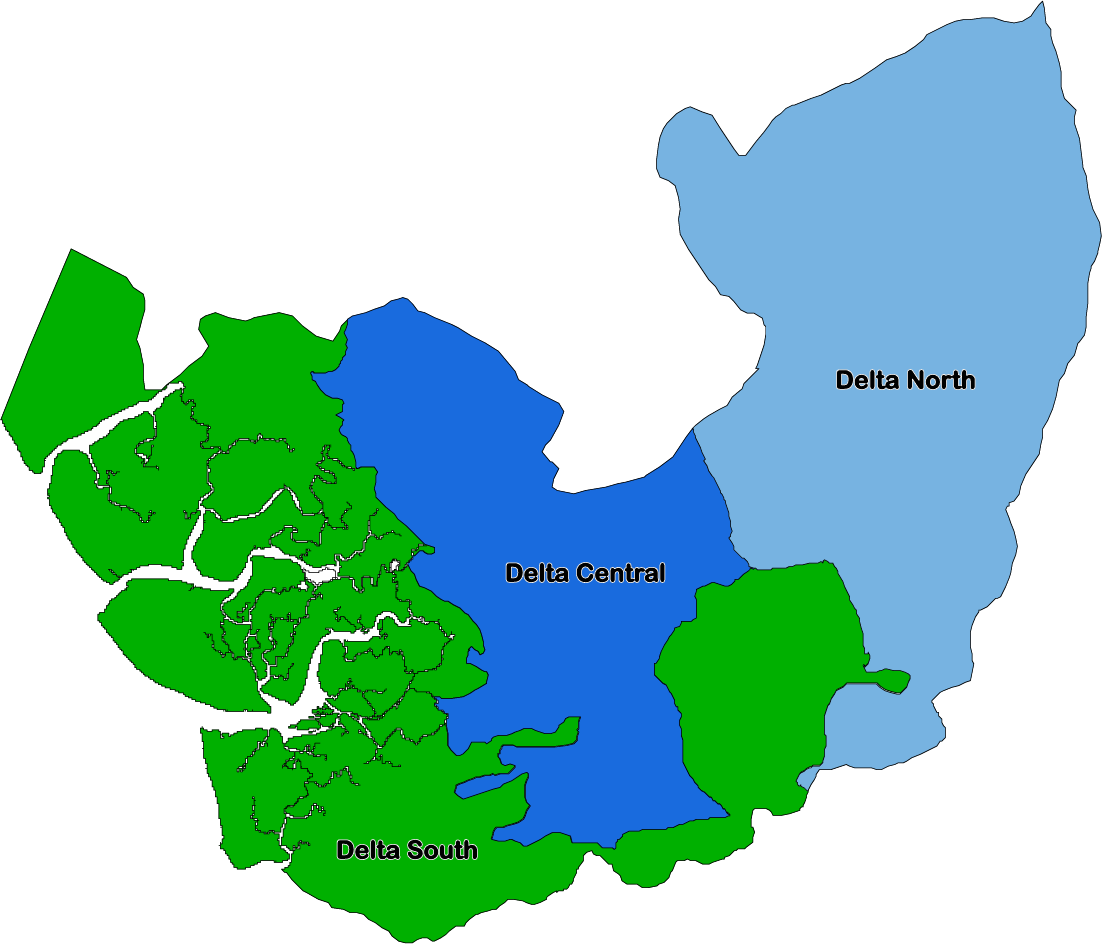
APC incumbent retiring APC incumbent running PDP incumbent retiring

District	Incumbent		Results	
District	Incumbent	Party	Status	Candidates
Delta Central	Ovie Omo-Agege	APC	Incumbent retired New member elected APC hold	▌ ✓ Ede Dafinone (APC); ▌Ighoyota Amori (PDP)
Delta North	Peter Nwaoboshi	APC (Note: This senator was elected as a member of the PDP but switched to the APC during their term.)	Incumbent lost re-election New member elected PDP gain	▌Peter Nwaoboshi (APC); ▌ ✓ Ned Nwoko (PDP)
Delta South	James Manager	PDP	Incumbent retired New member elected APC gain	▌ ✓ Joel-Onowakpo Thomas (APC); ▌Michael Diden (PDP)

== Delta Central ==
2023 Delta Central Senatorial District election
- 25 February 2023
Nominee	Ede Dafinone	Ighoyota Amori
Party	APC	PDP
Senator before election
Ovie Omo-Agege
APC
Elected Senator
To be determined
To be determined

The Delta Central Senatorial District covers the local government areas of Ethiope East, Ethiope West, Sapele, Okpe, Udu, Ughelli North, Ughelli South, and Uvwie. The incumbent Ovie Omo-Agege (APC) was re-elected with 51.3% of the vote in 2019. In April 2022, Omo-Agege announced that he would run for governor of Delta State, instead of seeking re-election.

=== Primary elections ===
==== All Progressives Congress ====
On 20 April 2022, the APC National Executive Committee announced the party's schedule for senatorial primaries, setting its expression of interest form price at ₦3 million and nomination form price at ₦17 million with a 50% discount for candidates younger than 40 while women and candidates with disabilities get free nomination forms. Forms were to be sold from 26 April to 6 May until the deadline was later extended to 10 May then 12 May. After the submission of nomination forms by 13 May, candidates were screened by a party committee on 14 and 15 May while 18 May was the date for the screening appeal process. Ward congresses and LGA congresses were set for 16 and 17 May to elect delegates for the primary. Candidates approved by the screening process advanced to a primary set for 27 May, in concurrence with other APC senatorial primaries; challenges to the result could be made on 28 May.

Prior to the primary, Omo-Agege endorsed Ede Dafinone as his anointed successor in a reported attempt to further his political network and become a godfather. The primary in Ughelli resulted in Dafinone—the Chairman of the Manufacturers Association of Nigeria Export Promotion Group—emerging as the nominee unopposed. Like other APC senatorial primary winners, Dafinone was unopposed reportedly due to an agreement between Omo-Agege, Nwaoboshi, and other state APC leaders.

APC primary results
Party	Candidate	Votes	%
APC	Ede Dafinone	383	100.00%
Total votes		383	100.00%
Invalid or blank votes		4	N/A
Turnout		387	Unknown

==== People's Democratic Party ====
On 16 March 2022, the national PDP announced its senatorial primary timetable, setting its expression of interest form price at ₦1 million and the nomination form price at ₦20 million with a 50% discount for candidates between 25 and 30. Forms were to be sold until 1 April but the party later extended the deadline four times before reaching a final deadline of 22 April. After the submission of nomination forms by 25 April, candidates were screened by a party committee on 27 April while 2 May was the rescheduled date for the screening appeal process. Ward congresses were set for 29 April and LGA congresses were rescheduled for 10 May to elect delegates for the primary. Candidates approved by the screening process advanced to a primary set for 23 May, in concurrence with other PDP senatorial primaries but due to often violently enforced Monday stay-at-home orders by separatists, southeastern state parties held their primaries on 24 May; challenges to the result could be made on 25 May.

Pre-primary analysis noted the primary as one of many proxy battles between former Governor James Ibori and Governor Ifeanyi Okowa with the former backing former Senator Ighoyota Amori and the latter supporting John Nani. The primary resulted in Amori defeating runner-up Nani by 7% at the Sapele Stadium; the result was a rare win for Ibori's camp as its candidate lost the gubernatorial primary and other Okowa loyalists won other nominations.

PDP primary results
Party	Candidate	Votes	%
PDP	Ighoyota Amori	142	53.58%
PDP	John Nani	123	46.42%
Total votes		265	100.00%

=== General election ===
==== Results ====
2023 Delta Central Senatorial District election
Party	Candidate	Votes	%
A	Osheo Felix Evwierhurhoma		
AA	Giane Nelson Gwede		
ADP	Ogheneovo Evah		
APP	Oghenekevwe Ewhrudjakpor		
ADC	Maver Sylvester Avworo		
APC	Ede Dafinone		
APGA	Peters Omoruayigbe Omaruaye		
APM	Monday Nurhierume		
NRM	Ovie Julius Animam		
New Nigeria Peoples Party	Glory Rukevwe Anigboro		
PDP	Ighoyota Amori		
SDP	Oviemuno Ekpekpo		
YPP	Ogheneovo Edewor		
ZLP	MacPherson Obenobe		
Total votes			100.00%
Invalid or blank votes			N/A
Turnout			

== Delta North ==
2023 Delta North Senatorial District election
- 25 February 2023
Nominee	Peter Nwaoboshi	Ned Nwoko
Party	APC	PDP
Senator before election
Peter Nwaoboshi
APC
Elected Senator
To be determined
To be determined

The Delta North Senatorial District covers the local government areas of Aniocha North, Aniocha South, Ika North East, Ika South, Ndokwa East, Ndokwa West, Oshimili South, Oshimili North, and Ukwuani. The incumbent Peter Nwaoboshi (APC) was elected with 82.2% of the vote in 2019 as a member of the PDP; he defected to the APC in June 2021. Nwaoboshi is running for re-election.

=== Primary elections ===
==== All Progressives Congress ====
On 20 April 2022, the APC National Executive Committee announced the party's schedule for senatorial primaries, setting its expression of interest form price at ₦3 million and nomination form price at ₦17 million with a 50% discount for candidates younger than 40 while women and candidates with disabilities get free nomination forms. Forms were to be sold from 26 April to 6 May until the deadline was later extended to 10 May then 12 May. After the submission of nomination forms by 13 May, candidates were screened by a party committee on 14 and 15 May while 18 May was the date for the screening appeal process. Ward congresses and LGA congresses were set for 16 and 17 May to elect delegates for the primary. Candidates approved by the screening process advanced to a primary set for 27 May, in concurrence with other APC senatorial primaries; challenges to the result could be made on 28 May.

The primary at the Federal College of Education (Technical) in Asaba resulted in Nwaoboshi emerging as the nominee unopposed. Like other APC senatorial primary winners, Nwaoboshi was unopposed reportedly due to an agreement between Omo-Agege, Nwaoboshi, and other state APC leaders.

==== People's Democratic Party ====
On 16 March 2022, the national PDP announced its senatorial primary timetable, setting its expression of interest form price at ₦1 million and the nomination form price at ₦20 million with a 50% discount for candidates between 25 and 30. Forms were to be sold until 1 April but the party later extended the deadline four times before reaching a final deadline of 22 April. After the submission of nomination forms by 25 April, candidates were screened by a party committee on 27 April while 2 May was the rescheduled date for the screening appeal process. Ward congresses were set for 29 April and LGA congresses were rescheduled for 10 May to elect delegates for the primary. Candidates approved by the screening process advanced to a primary set for 23 May, in concurrence with other PDP senatorial primaries but due to often violently enforced Monday stay-at-home orders by separatists, southeastern state parties held their primaries on 24 May; challenges to the result could be made on 25 May.

In the months before the primary, some pundits expected outgoing Governor Ifeanyi Okowa to run for a return to the Senate; however, he declined to run and was later selected as the PDP vice presidential nominee. Okowa chose to support Ned Nwoko for the PDP nomination. The primary at the Stephen Keshi Stadium in Asaba resulted in Nwoko—a former MHR, businessman, and husband of Regina Daniels—emerging as the nominee over businessman Paul Osaji by a 57% margin. After collation completed, Nwoko claimed that his entrance into the Senate would positively impact the entire nation.

PDP primary results
Party	Candidate	Votes	%
PDP	Ned Nwoko	242	78.32%
PDP	Paul Osaji	67	21.68%
Total votes		309	100.00%

=== Campaign ===
After the start of the official campaign period in October, Nwoko went on the offensive by deriding Nwaoboshi's tenure as senator as useless along with daring Nwaoboshi to start open campaigning. By late November, pundits and civil groups had also noted Nwaoboshi's absence from campaigning with rumors that it was connected to his avoidance of his prison term. In early January 2023, the Supreme Court briefly granted Nwaoboshi bail while fast tracking the date of his appeal hearings. However, near the end of the month, the court revoked the bail based on the fact that Nwaoboshi had remained a fugitive since his sentencing. On 6 February, Nwaoboshi was finally caught in Lagos by the EFCC and imprisoned at the Ikoyi Custodial Centre.

=== General election ===
==== Results ====
2023 Delta North Senatorial District election
Party	Candidate	Votes	%
A	Ijomah Federick Obi		
ADP	Chionye Hencs Odiaka		
APP	Gochi Ugo Apuamaga		
ADC	Kenneth Chibuogwu Gbandi		
APC	Peter Nwaoboshi		
APGA	Isaac Obodo		
APM	Clement Iselegwu		
LP	Kennedy Onochie Kanma		
New Nigeria Peoples Party	Marian Nneamaka Ogoh-Ali		
PRP	Chiazor Ahumibe		
PDP	Ned Nwoko		
SDP	Peter Nwafor		
ZLP	Emeka Nkwoala		
Total votes			100.00%
Invalid or blank votes			N/A
Turnout			

== Delta South ==
2023 Delta South Senatorial District election
- 25 February 2023
Nominee	Joel-Onowakpo Thomas	Michael Diden
Party	APC	PDP
Senator before election
James Manager
PDP
Elected Senator
To be determined
To be determined

The Delta South Senatorial District covers the local government areas of Bomadi, Burutu, Isoko North, Isoko South, Patani, Warri North, Warri South, and Warri South West. The incumbent James Manager (PDP) was elected with 66.2% of the vote in 2019. In April 2022, Manager announced that he would run for governor of Delta State, instead of seeking re-election; he lost the PDP gubernatorial primary.

=== Primary elections ===
==== All Progressives Congress ====
On 20 April 2022, the APC National Executive Committee announced the party's schedule for senatorial primaries, setting its expression of interest form price at ₦3 million and nomination form price at ₦17 million with a 50% discount for candidates younger than 40 while women and candidates with disabilities get free nomination forms. Forms were to be sold from 26 April to 6 May until the deadline was later extended to 10 May then 12 May. After the submission of nomination forms by 13 May, candidates were screened by a party committee on 14 and 15 May while 18 May was the date for the screening appeal process. Ward congresses and LGA congresses were set for 16 and 17 May to elect delegates for the primary. Candidates approved by the screening process advanced to a primary set for 27 May, in concurrence with other APC senatorial primaries; challenges to the result could be made on 28 May.

The primary in Oleh resulted in Joel-Onowakpo Thomas—the former Chairman of Delta State Board of Internal Revenue—emerging as the nominee unopposed. Like other APC senatorial primary winners, Thomas was unopposed reportedly due to an agreement between Omo-Agege, Nwaoboshi, and other state APC leaders.

APC primary results
Party	Candidate	Votes	%
APC	Joel-Onowakpo Thomas	285	100.00%
Total votes		285	100.00%
Invalid or blank votes		75	N/A
Turnout		360	Unknown

==== People's Democratic Party ====
On 16 March 2022, the national PDP announced its senatorial primary timetable, setting its expression of interest form price at ₦1 million and the nomination form price at ₦20 million with a 50% discount for candidates between 25 and 30. Forms were to be sold until 1 April but the party later extended the deadline four times before reaching a final deadline of 22 April. After the submission of nomination forms by 25 April, candidates were screened by a party committee on 27 April while 2 May was the rescheduled date for the screening appeal process. Ward congresses were set for 29 April and LGA congresses were rescheduled for 10 May to elect delegates for the primary. Candidates approved by the screening process advanced to a primary set for 23 May, in concurrence with other PDP senatorial primaries but due to often violently enforced Monday stay-at-home orders by separatists, southeastern state parties held their primaries on 24 May; challenges to the result could be made on 25 May.

Former Governor Emmanuel Uduaghan, who was the APC nominee for the seat in 2019 and returned to the PDP in 2020, initially announced a new run for the seat but he withdrew and retired from politics in March 2022. Both of the two remaining major candidates—former DESOPADEC Chairman Michael Diden and former MHR Daniel Reyenieju—solicited Uduaghan's endorsement before the primary. On the primary date, Diden defeated Reyenieju by a 47% margin at the Warri Township Stadium. After the vote, Diden said the victory was a demonstration of the electorate's confidence in him.

PDP primary results
Party	Candidate	Votes	%
PDP	Michael Diden	176	64.71%
PDP	Daniel Reyenieju	48	17.65%
PDP	Ayodele Othihiwa	46	16.91%
PDP	Kent Omatsone	2	0.73%
Total votes		272	100.00%

=== General election ===
==== Results ====
2023 Delta South Senatorial District election
Party	Candidate	Votes	%
APP	Peter Avinyeze		
ADC	Regina Oke Emevwereni		
APC	Joel-Onowakpo Thomas		
APGA	George Ugulasuowei Timinimi		
APM	Whiskey Arerosuoghene Ewubareh		
LP	Terence Ogagaoghene Obaoghe		
NRM	Toju Awiu Binitie		
New Nigeria Peoples Party	Omatseye O'weyimmi Nesiama		
PRP	Oyibo Waibode		
PDP	Michael Diden		
SDP	Princewill Oghenovo		
YPP	Franklin Miebi Garry		
ZLP	Lucky Akakasi		
Total votes			100.00%
Invalid or blank votes			N/A
Turnout			

== See also ==
- 2023 Nigerian Senate election
- 2023 Nigerian elections
