= 2019 Nigerian Senate elections in Delta State =

The 2019 Nigerian Senate election in Delta State held on February 23, 2019, to elect members of the Nigerian Senate to represent Delta State. James Manager Ebiowou representing Delta North, Nwaoboshi Peter Onyeluka representing Delta South both won on the platform of the People's Democratic Party, while Ovie Omo-Agege representing Delta Central won on the platform of All Progressives Congress.

== Overview ==
| Affiliation | Party | | Total |
| Affiliation | APC | PDP | Total |
|---|---|---|---|
| Before Election | 1 | 2 | 3 |
| After Election | 1 | 2 | 3 |

== Summary ==
| District | Incumbent | Party | Elected Senator | Party |
|---|---|---|---|---|
| Delta South | James Manager | PDP | James Manager | PDP |
| Delta Central | Ovie Omo-Agege | APC | Ovie Omo-Agege | APC |
| Delta North | Peter Nwaoboshi | PDP | Peter Nwaoboshi | PDP |

== Results ==
=== Delta South ===
A total of 25 candidates registered with the Independent National Electoral Commission to contest in the election. PDP candidate James Manager won the election, defeating APC candidate Emmanuel Uduaghan and 23 other party candidates. Manager received 66.15% of the votes, while Uduaghan received 32.27%

2019 Nigerian Senate election in Delta State
| Party | Candidate | Votes | % |
|---|---|---|---|
| PDP | James Manager | 257,812 | 66.15% |
| APC | Emmanuel Uduaghan | 125,752 | 32.27% |
| Others | | 6,177 | 1.58% |
| Total votes | | 389,741 | 100% |
| PDP hold | | | |

=== Delta Central ===
A total of 18 candidates registered with the Independent National Electoral Commission to contest in the election. APC candidate Ovie Omo-Agege won the election, defeating PDP candidate Evelyn Omavowan Oboro and 16 other party candidates. Omo-Agege received 51.34% of the votes, while Oboro received 45.94%

2019 Nigerian Senate election in Delta State
| Party | Candidate | Votes | % |
|---|---|---|---|
| APC | Ovie Omo-Agege | 111,100 | 51.34% |
| PDP | Evelyn Omavowan Oboro | 99,422 | 45.94% |
| Others | | 5,896 | 2.72% |
| Total votes | | 216,418 | 100% |
| APC hold | | | |

=== Delta North ===
A total of 25 candidates registered with the Independent National Electoral Commission to contest in the election. PDP candidate Peter Nwaoboshi won the election, defeating APC candidate Doris Uboh and 23 other party candidates. Nwaoboshi received 82.23% of the votes, while Uboh received 16.03%

2019 Nigerian Senate election in Delta State
| Party | Candidate | Votes | % |
|---|---|---|---|
| PDP | Peter Nwaoboshi | 186,423 | 82.23% |
| APC | Doris Uboh | 36,350 | 16.03% |
| Others | | 3,943 | 1.74% |
| Total votes | | 226,716 | 100% |
| PDP hold | | | |
