= 2015 Nigerian Senate elections in Delta State =

The 2015 Nigerian Senate election in Benue State was held on March 28, 2015, to elect members of the Nigerian Senate to represent Delta State. Peter Nwaboshi representing Delta North, James Manager representing Delta South won on the platform of the People's Democratic Party (Nigeria) while Ovie Omo-Agege representing Delta Central won on the platform of the Labour Party (Nigeria).

== Overview ==
Affiliation	Party		Total
Affiliation	PDP	LP	Total
Before Election	3	0	3
After Election	2	1	3

== Summary ==
District	Incumbent	Party	Elected Senator	Party
Delta Central	Akpor Pius Ewherido	PDP	Ovie Omo-Agege	LP
Delta North	Ifeanyi Okowa	PDP	Peter Nwaboshi	PDP
Delta South	James Manager	PDP	James Manager	PDP

== Results ==
=== Delta Central ===
Labour Party candidate Ovie Omo-Agege won the election, defeating People's Democratic Party candidate Ighoyota Amori, All Progressives Congress candidate John Agoda and other party candidates.

2015 Nigerian Senate election in Delta State
Party	Candidate	Votes	%
LP	Ovie Omo-Agege		
PDP	Ighoyota Amori		
APC	John Agoda		
Total votes			
LP hold			

=== Delta North ===
People's Democratic Party candidate Peter Nwaboshi won the election, defeating All Progressives Congress candidate Njideaka Okwudili, Labour Party candidate Nwadiani Ikechukwu, and other party candidates.

2015 Nigerian Senate election in Delta State
Party	Candidate	Votes	%
PDP	Peter Nwaboshi		
LP	Nwadiani Ikechukwu		
APC	Njideaka Okwudili		
Total votes			
PDP hold			

=== Delta South ===
People's Democratic Party candidate James Manager won the election, defeating All Progressives Congress candidate Pius Omike, Labour Party candidate Oniyetsoritse Elijah, and other party candidates.

2015 Nigerian Senate election in Delta State
Party	Candidate	Votes	%
PDP	James Manager		
LP	Oniyetsoritse Elijah		
APC	Pius Omike		
Total votes			
PDP hold			
