= List of governors of Delta State =

Governor of Delta State
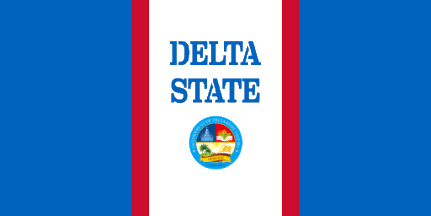
- Flag of Delta State of Nigeria
- Incumbent; Sheriff Oborevwori since 29 May 2023
- Government of Delta State
- Style: Governor (informal); His Excellency or Your Excellency (courtesy)
- Member of: Executive Council of Delta State
- Reports to: President of Nigeria
- Residence: Government House, Asaba
- Seat: Asaba
- Appointer: Popular vote
- Term length: Four years, renewable once consecutively
- Constituting instrument: Constitution of Nigeria
- Inaugural holder: Felix Ibru
- Formation: 27 August 1991
- Deputy: Deputy governor of Delta State

Location of Delta State in Nigeria

Delta State, situated in Nigeria's southern region, has had various leaders since Nigeria gained independence in 1960, both military and civilian. After independence in 1960, Nigeria had only three regions, and the area of the future Delta State was located in the Western Region. The Mid-Western Region was separated from the Western Region in August 1963 and had Dennis Osadebay as its first premier. Osadebay served until January 1966, when he was replaced by David Akpode Ejoor, the first military governor. Control of the region was contested during the Nigerian Civil War (1967–1970), and Ejoor was replaced by Samuel Ogbemudia. Ogbemudia governed the Mid-Western Region from September 1967 to July 1975. The region was renamed and reorganised as the Bendel State on 17 March 1976, its name a combination of the old Benin and Delta provinces. Some governors during this time period include George Agbazika Innih, Husaini Abdullahi, and Ambrose Folorunsho Alli. Ogbemudia also returned for a three-month stint as a civilian governor in 1983 before the military reasserted control.

The modern Delta State was established on 27 August 1991, following the division of Bendel State into Edo and Delta states. Felix Ibru became the first civilian governor of Delta State from January 1992 to November 1993, followed by military governors. In the democratic era, James Ibori served from 1999 to 2007, and was succeeded by Emmanuel Uduaghan. Ifeanyi Okowa served from 2015 to 2023, followed by Sheriff Oborevwori, who is the incumbent.

== List of governors ==
=== Western Region ===
The Western Region was governed by a premier and a ceremonial governor. From October 1954 to December 1959, Obafemi Awolowo served as the region's first premier, during which he implemented the Universal Primary Education programme. He was succeeded by Samuel Ladoke Akintola, who held the position until the region's political crisis escalated in the early 1960s. Meanwhile, Adesoji Aderemi served as the Governor of the Western Region, a largely ceremonial role that represented the British monarchy until Nigeria became a republic in 1963. The premier was responsible for the region's executive functions. Administrators were usually appointed to rule a state when there is a political crisis or state of emergency.

In 1962, a political crisis occurred when Governor Aderemi dismissed Akintola following allegations of corruption and maladministration. This led to a state of emergency in the region. During the emergency, Moses Adekoyejo Majekodunmi was appointed as the temporary administrator, displacing the region's political leadership. After six months, Akintola was reinstated as premier following a court ruling overturning his dismissal. The political instability during this period contributed to the regional tensions that persisted even after the Western Region was split and the Mid-Western Region was created in 1963.

=== Mid-Western Region ===
The Mid-Western Region of Nigeria was created on 9 August 1963. The region was carved out of the Western Region, becoming Nigeria's fourth region. The Mid-Western Region initially had a premier, but later military governors would also serve as the chief officials.

Dennis Osadebay served as the region's first civilian leader, and was premier from August 1963 to January 1966. Political turmoil led to military administrations, starting with David Akpode Ejoor in January 1966. The region was taken by the Biafran Armed Forces during the Nigerian Civil War, with Albert Okonkwo administering the area from August to September 1967 on behalf of Biafra.

Samuel Ogbemudia served as military governor from September 1967 to July 1975.

Governors and Military Administrators of the Mid-Western Region, Nigeria
№	Name		Title	Term in office	Notes
1	—	Dennis Osadebay (1911–1994)	Premier	August 1963 – January 1966	First and only Premier of the Mid-Western Region
2	—	David Ejoor (1932–2019)	Military Governor	January 1966 – August 1967	The 15 January 1966 military coup in Nigeria led to Ejoor's appointment as Military Governor of the Midwest Region. As Lieutenant-Colonel and Commander of the Army Battalion in Enugu, he was involved in the events surrounding the coup. Following the coup, Ejoor became a member of the Supreme Military Council (SMC), Nigeria's highest governing body.
3	—	Albert Okonkwo	Administrator	August 1967 – September 1967	Administered the region under Biafran control during the Nigerian Civil War
4	—	Samuel Ogbemudia (1932–2017)	Military Governor	September 1967 (Note: In September 1967, Ogbemudia was appointed military administrator after Biafran troops entered the state. David Ejoor, the previous military governor, had left the state. Ogbemudia then took on the role of military governor.) – July 1975	Known for post-war reconstruction and development projects

=== Bendel State ===
Following administrative changes in Nigeria, the Mid-Western Region was renamed Bendel State on 17 March 1976. This renaming was part of a broader national effort to reorganise Nigeria's states and local governments under the regime of General Murtala Mohammed.

George Agbazika Innih was the first military governor of Bendel State. He was followed by Husaini Abdullahi, who governed from March 1976 to July 1978. Abubakar Waziri served as the military administrator from 24 July 1978 to 30 September 1979. Ambrose Folorunsho Alli was elected as the first executive civilian governor in October 1979 under the Unity Party of Nigeria and served until September 1983. Samuel Ogbemudia was elected as a civilian governor under the National Party of Nigeria and briefly served from October to December 1983. His brief tenure was due to the 1983 military coup to oust Alhaji Shehu Shagari and install Muhammadu Buhari as military head of state.

Jeremiah Timbut Useni took office in January 1984 and led till 27 August 1985, followed by John Mark Inienger from September 1985 to July 1988. Jonathan Tunde Ogbeha governed from July 1988 to August 1990, and John Ewerekumoh Yeri served from August 1990 to 27 August 1991. The state was divided into Edo and Delta states on 27 August 1991 with Luke Chijiuba Ochulor serving as the first military governor of the newly formed Delta State.

Executive Governors and Military Administrators of Bendel State, Nigeria
№	Name		Title	Term in office	Notes
1	—	George Agbazika Innih (1938–2002)	Military Governor	August 1975 – March 1976	
2	Hussaini Abdullahi	Husaini Abdullahi (1939–2019)	Military Governor	March 1976 – July 1978	Following the unsuccessful Dimka coup, the Supreme Military Council reorganised the governance structure. On 15 March 1976, it was announced that George Agbazika Innih would be reassigned from Bendel State to Kwara State, which had been without a permanent governor since Taiwo's assassination. Concurrently, Captain Hussein Abdullahi, a naval officer, was appointed to succeed Innih in Bendel State.
3	—	Abubakar Waziri (b. 1940)	Military Governor	24 July 1978 – 30 September 1979	Also served as a brigade commander for Nigeria Army Benin City
4	—	Ambrose Folorunsho Alli (1929–1989)	Executive Governor	October 1979 – September 1983	Elected as the first civilian governor of Bendel under the umbrella of the Unity Party of Nigeria
5	—	Samuel Ogbemudia (1922–2017)	Executive Governor	October 1983 – 31 December 1983	Brief return to civilian rule, under the umbrella of the National Party of Nigeria, before the 1983 military coup
6	—	Jeremiah Useni (b. 1943)	Military Governor	January 1984 – 27 August 1985	
7	—	John Mark Inienger (1945–2002)	Military Governor	September 1985 – July 1988	
8	—	Jonathan Tunde Ogbeha (b. 1945)	Military Governor	July 1988 – August 1990	
9	—	John Ewerekumoh Yeri	Military Governor	August 1990 – 27 August 1991 (Note: John Ewerekumoh Yeri served as Military Governor of Bendel State from August 1990 to August 1991. After the state's division, Luke Chijiuba Ochulor became the first Military Governor of Delta State, serving from 27 August 1991, to January 1992. He was followed by Felix Ibru, who took office in January 1992. Yeri was appointed as the first Military Governor of Edo State. Elections were held, and the Social Democratic Party won the gubernatorial election.)	Last military governor before the creation of Edo and Delta states

=== Delta State ===
Delta State was established on 27 August 1991, following the division of Bendel State into Edo and Delta States. A new office was created for the 1999 elections: deputy governor of Delta State. Deputies were elected on a joint ticket with the gubernatorial candidate, and thus share the same party by default.

The 2011 Delta State gubernatorial re-run election took place after the annulment of the 2007 election by the Federal High Court, which had initially declared Emmanuel Uduaghan of the Peoples Democratic Party as the winner. The re-run, organised by the Independent National Electoral Commission, resulted in Uduaghan retaining his position by winning in 12 out of the 22 local government areas where results were collated, defeating Great Ogboru of the Democratic People's Party, who secured victories in 10 local government areas.

Military and Executive Governors of Delta State
№	Governor		Term in office	Party	Election	D. Governor
1	—	Luke Chijiuba Ochulor	27 August 1991 – January 1992	Military	—N/a	Office did not exist
2	—	Felix Ibru (b. 1935)	January 1992 – November 1993	SDP	1991	Office did not exist
3	—	Abdulkadir Shehu	November 1993 – 10 December 1993	Military (acting)	—N/a	Office did not exist
4	—	Bassey Asuquo	10 December 1993 – 26 September 1994	Military	—N/a	Office did not exist
5	—	Ibrahim Kefas (b. 1948)	26 September 1994 – 22 August 1996	Military	—N/a	Office did not exist
6	—	John Dungs (b. 1952)	22 August 1996 – 12 August 1998	Military	—N/a	Office did not exist
7	—	Walter Feghabo (1956–2025)	12 August 1998 - 29 May 1999	Military	—N/a	Office did not exist
8	—	James Ibori (b. 1958)	29 May 1999 – 29 May 2007	PDP	1999; 2003	Benjamin Elue
9	Emmanuel Ewatan Uduaghan	Emmanuel Uduaghan (1954–2026)	29 May 2007 – 29 May 2015	PDP	2007; 2011 by-election 2011	Amos Utuama
10	Ifeanyi Okowa	Ifeanyi Okowa (b. 1959)	29 May 2015 – 29 May 2023	PDP	2015; 2019	Kingsley Otuaro
11	—	Sheriff Oborevwori (b. 1963)	29 May 2023 – Incumbent	PDP	2023	Monday Onyeme

== See also ==
- List of governors of Edo State
- List of state governors of Nigeria
