= 2007 Delta State gubernatorial election =

Election for Governor of Delta State

- 14 April 2007
Nominee	Emmanuel Uduaghan	Great Ogboru
Party	PDP	DPP
Popular vote	1,004,043	46,809
Governor before election
James Ibori
PDP
Elected Governor
Emmanuel Uduaghan
PDP

The 2007 Delta State gubernatorial election was the 4th gubernatorial election of Delta State. Held on 14 April 2007, the People's Democratic Party nominee Emmanuel Uduaghan won the election, defeating Great Ogboru of the Democratic People's Party.

== Results ==
Emmanuel Uduaghan from the People's Democratic Party won the election, defeating Great Ogboru from the Democratic People's Party. Registered voters was 1,626,930.

2007 Delta State gubernatorial election
Party	Candidate	Votes	%	±%
PDP	Emmanuel Uduaghan	1,004,043	0	
DPP	Great Ogboru	46,809	0	
PDP hold				
