= 2007 Nigerian Senate elections in Delta State =

2007 Nigerian Senate election in Delta State

The 2007 Nigerian Senate election in Delta State was held on 21 April 2007, to elect members of the Nigerian Senate to represent Delta State. James Manager representing Delta South and Adego Erhiawarie Eferakeya representing Delta Central won on the platform of Peoples Democratic Party, while Patrick Osakwe representing Delta North won on the platform of the Accord.

== Overview ==
Affiliation	Party		Total
Affiliation	PDP	A	Total
Before Election			3
After Election	2	1	3

== Summary ==
District	Incumbent	Party	Elected Senator	Party
Delta South			James Manager	PDP
Delta Central			Adego Erhiawarie Eferakeya	PDP
Delta North			Patrick Osakwe	A

== Results ==
=== Delta South ===
The election was won by James Manager of the Peoples Democratic Party.

2007 Nigerian Senate election in Delta State
Party	Candidate	Votes	%
PDP	James Manager		
Total votes			
PDP hold			

=== Delta Central ===
The election was won by Adego Erhiawarie Eferakeya of the Peoples Democratic Party.

2007 Nigerian Senate election in Delta State
Party	Candidate	Votes	%
PDP	Adego Erhiawarie Eferakeya		
Total votes			
PDP hold			

=== Delta North ===
The election was won by Patrick Osakwe of the Accord.

2007 Nigerian Senate election in Delta State
Party	Candidate	Votes	%
A	Patrick Osakwe		
Total votes			
A hold			
