= 2011 Delta State gubernatorial election =

Election for Governor of Delta State

- 26 April 2011
Nominee	Emmanuel Uduaghan	Great Ogboru
Party	PDP	DPP
Popular vote	525,793	433,834
Governor before election
Emmanuel Uduaghan
PDP
Elected Governor
Emmanuel Uduaghan
PDP

The 2011 Delta State gubernatorial election was the 5th gubernatorial election of Delta State. Held on 26 April 2011, the People's Democratic Party nominee Emmanuel Uduaghan won the election, defeating Great Ogboru of the Democratic People's Party.

== Results ==
A total of 23 candidates contested in the election. Emmanuel Uduaghan from the People's Democratic Party won the election, defeating Great Ogboru from the Democratic People's Party. Valid votes was 1,017,234, votes cast was 1,051,229, 33,995 votes was cancelled.

2011 Delta State gubernatorial election
Party	Candidate	Votes	%	±%
PDP	Emmanuel Uduaghan	525,793	51.69	
DPP	Great Ogboru	433,834	42.65	
PDP hold				
