= 2003 Delta State gubernatorial election =

2003 gubernatorial election in Delta State, Nigeria

- (Nigeria)
- April 19, 2003
Nominee	James Ibori	Lucky Oghene Omoru
Party	PDP	ANPP
Running mate	Benjamin Elue
Popular vote	1,038,607
Governor before election
James Ibori
PDP
Elected Governor
James Ibori
PDP

The 2003 Delta State gubernatorial election occurred on April 19, 2003. Incumbent Governor, PDP's James Ibori won election for a second term, defeating ANPP's Lucky Oghene Omoru and four other candidates.

James Ibori emerged winner in the PDP gubernatorial primary election. His running mate was Benjamin Elue.

== Electoral system ==
The Governor of Delta State is elected using the plurality voting system.

== Results ==
A total of six candidates registered with the Independent National Electoral Commission to contest in the election. Incumbent Governor, PDP's James Ibori won election for a second term, defeating five other candidates.

The total number of registered voters in the state was 1,607,337. However, only 56.44% (i.e. 907,251) of registered voters participated in the exercise.

Candidate	Party	Votes	%
James Ibori	People's Democratic Party (PDP)	1,038,607	100.00
Lucky Oghene Omoru	All Nigeria Peoples Party (ANPP)		
Emma Okocha	All Progressives Grand Alliance (APGA)		
Great Ogboru	Alliance for Democracy (AD)		
Joshua Emene	United Nigeria People's Party (UNPP)		
Moses Kragha	National Democratic Party (NDP)		
Total		1,038,607	100.00
Registered voters/turnout		1,607,337	–
Source: Gamji, Africa Update, Dawodu
