= Peter Nwaoboshi =

Nigerian politician (1958–2025)

Senator of the Federal Republic of Nigeria from Delta North Senatorial District
- In office 9 June 2015 – 11 June 2023
- Preceded by: Ifeanyi Okowa
- Succeeded by: Ned Nwoko

Chairman People's Democratic Party, Delta State
- In office 2008–2014

Personal details
- Born: 29 June 1958 Delta State, Federation of Nigeria
- Died: 19 December 2025 (aged 67)
- Citizenship: [Nigeria
- Party: All Progressives Congress (2021–2025); Peoples Democratic Party (before 2021)

Peter Onyeluka Nwaoboshi (29 June 1958 – 19 December 2025) was a Nigerian politician who served as the senator representing Delta North senatorial district in the Nigerian Senate from 2015 to 2023. He was sacked shortly after being announced senator-elect during the 2019 general elections by a Federal High Court in Abuja, following allegations that he was not validly elected by his political party. The Appeal Court in Abuja however overturned the decision on 30 May 2019. The lead judge held that the Federal High Court that nullified his election had no jurisdiction over the case.

== Early life and education ==
Peter Nwaoboshi was born in 1958 in Delta State, Nigeria. Nwaoboshi attended St.Thomas Teachers College where he obtained his West African School Certificate in 1976. In 1986, he graduated from University of Benin where he obtained a Bachelor of Laws. He also has a Master of Laws from Delta State University.

== Career ==
Nwaoboshi began his career in 1979 as an aide to Samuel Ogbemudia, Governor of the defunct Bendel State. Subsequently, he was appointed chairman of the Nigerian Railway Corporation. In 1999, he was also a political adviser to Governor James Ibori. In 2000, he was appointed Commissioner for Agriculture and Special Duties in Delta State where he served in that position till 2006. In 2008, he was appointed State Chairman of the People's Democratic Party in Delta State. He served for a second term as State Chairman in 2012 and in 2014 resigned to run for senate.

In 2015, he was elected into office as a Senator representing Delta North senatorial district in the National Assembly. He was subsequently appointed Chairman Senate committee on Niger Delta. In 2019, he was re-elected into the senate under the People's Democratic Party. On 23 June 2021, the Delta State PDP suspended Nwaoboshi for "anti-party activities after a public spat between Nwaoboshi and Governor Ifeanyi Okowa. Nwaoboshi called the suspension "laughable" and "illegal" before leaving the PDP two days later and joining the APC at a meeting with President Buhari and Delta Central Senator Ovie Omo-Agege. The Punch reported that Nwaoboshi's switch was in preparation for a run for Deputy Governor of Delta State.

=== Election dispute ===
On 3 April 2019, a Federal High Court in Abuja sacked Nwaoboshi as Senator-elect for Delta North senatorial district on grounds that he was not validly nominated in the party primaries held by the People's Democratic Party in Delta State. He was also ordered by Justice Ahmed Mohammed to stop parading himself as senator-elect. According to the summons filed against him by his opponent in the party primaries, Prince Ned Nwoko stated that the People's Democratic party had unlawfully announced him the winner after he was defeated in the primaries, it was also alleged that Nwoboshi hired thugs to cause a mass scare and stampede when he learnt of his brewing defeat.

On 4 April 2019, Nwaoboshi appealed to the judgement sacking him as senator-elect. On 17 April 2019, a Federal High Court in Abuja denied Nwaoboshi's appeal to issue a restraining order to Independent National Electoral Commission stating that it was out of its jurisdiction as an Appeal court had already ruled on the case, consequently the Justice Mahmud Mohammed ordered that Independent National Electorate Commission should withdraw the certificate of return issued to Nwaoboshi and reissue a new certificate to Prince Ned Nwoko. Although he is now the Delta North Senator.

On 11 May 2019, the Independent National Electoral Commission withdrew the certificate of return issued to Nwaoboshi. The certificate was returned when the court decision was overturned.

=== Bills sponsored ===
In 2016, Nwaoboshi sponsored a bill "The Code of Conduct Act Cap C15 LFN 2004 (Amendment) Bill, 2016 (SB 248)". The bill passed its first reading but was never signed or implemented into law.

== Corruption allegations ==
=== ₦322 million fraud and money laundering trial ===
In April 2018, the Economic and Financial Crimes Commission arraigned Nwaoboshi on charges of fraud and money laundering. The prosecution claimed Nwaoboshi's companies bought a Lagos building for ₦805 million in 2014 with the knowledge that ₦322 million of the payment would be used illegally; Nwaoboshi denied the claims and entered a not guilty plea. In June 2021, Nwaoboshi was cleared of the fraud and money laundering charges after presiding Justice Chukwujekwu Aneke said the EFCC failed to prove the charges and relied on hearsay. The EFCC said that they would appeal the decision.

=== False Asset Declaration ===
In April 2016, a Sahara Reporters article accused Nwaoboshi of acquiring under suspicious circumstances and then failing to disclose a Lagos property he owns. The home was owned by the Delta State Government before being sold to Nwaoboshi for a suspiciously low price and Nwaoboshi had not declared his ownership as legally required. The report came in the wake of Nwaoboshi sponsoring an amendment intended to weaken anti-corruption laws, and the article claimed that his support may have been in an attempt to stop the Code of Conduct Bureau from trying him.

In June 2019, charges were filed against Nwaoboshi for failing to declare his true assets after an investigation by the Special Presidential Investigation Panel on the Recovery of Public Property (SPIP) which accused Nwaoboshi of failing to disclose his ownership of three Sterling Bank accounts. In July 2018, SPIP temporarily sealed several more of Nwaoboshi's assets including up to 14 properties and 22 bank accounts.

=== NDDC contract scandal ===
In June 2020, the Niger Delta Development Commission accused Nwaoboshi of using 11 front companies to defraud the Commission out of ₦3.6 billion worth of contracts in September 2016. The accusation came not long after Nwaoboshi accused Niger Delta Minister Godswill Akpabio of improperly securing project funds when Akpabio was Senate Minority Leader. While the accusations were a part of a wider spat between Akpabio and the National Assembly, the accusation against Nwaoboshi was termed "biggest single case of looting of the commission’s resources" by NDDC spokesperson Charles Odili.

=== Conviction ===
The Court of Appeal on 1 July 2022, found Nwaoboshi guilty of money laundering and sentenced him to seven years imprisonment alongside two of his companies Golden Touch Construction Project Ltd and Suiming Electrical Ltd. The conviction followed an appeal of the previous judgment by a Federal High Court dismissing the submission of the Economic and Financial Crimes Commission.

The Appeal Court ruled that there was merit in the application of the EFCC and that Nwaoboshi failed to convince the court that he didn't commit the crime.

== Death ==
Nwaoboshi died after a short illness on 19 December 2025, aged 67.
