= 2011 Delta State gubernatorial by-election =

State election in Nigeria

- 6 January 2011
Nominee	Emmanuel Uduaghan	Great Ogboru
Party	PDP	DPP
Popular vote	275,253	138,244
Governor before election
Emmanuel Uduaghan
PDP
Elected Governor
Emmanuel Uduaghan
PDP

The 2011 Delta State gubernatorial by-election was the 1st gubernatorial by-election of Delta State after the 2007 Delta State gubernatorial election was annulled. Held on 6 January 2011, the People's Democratic Party nominee Emmanuel Uduaghan won the election, defeating Great Ogboru of the Democratic People's Party.

== Results ==
A total of 15 candidates contested in the election. Emmanuel Uduaghan from the People's Democratic Party won the election, defeating Great Ogboru from the Democratic People's Party. Registered voters was 1,548,647, valid votes was 433,312, votes cast was 450,376, 17,064 votes was cancelled. Emmanuel Uduaghan from the People's Democratic Party won in 14 local government areas, while Great Ogboru from the Democratic People's Party won in 11 out of 25 local government areas in the state.

2011 Delta State gubernatorial election
Party	Candidate	Votes	%	±%
PDP	Emmanuel Uduaghan	275,253	64	
DPP	Great Ogboru	138,244	32	
PDP hold				
