= Ede Dafinone =

Nigerian accountant, politician, senator

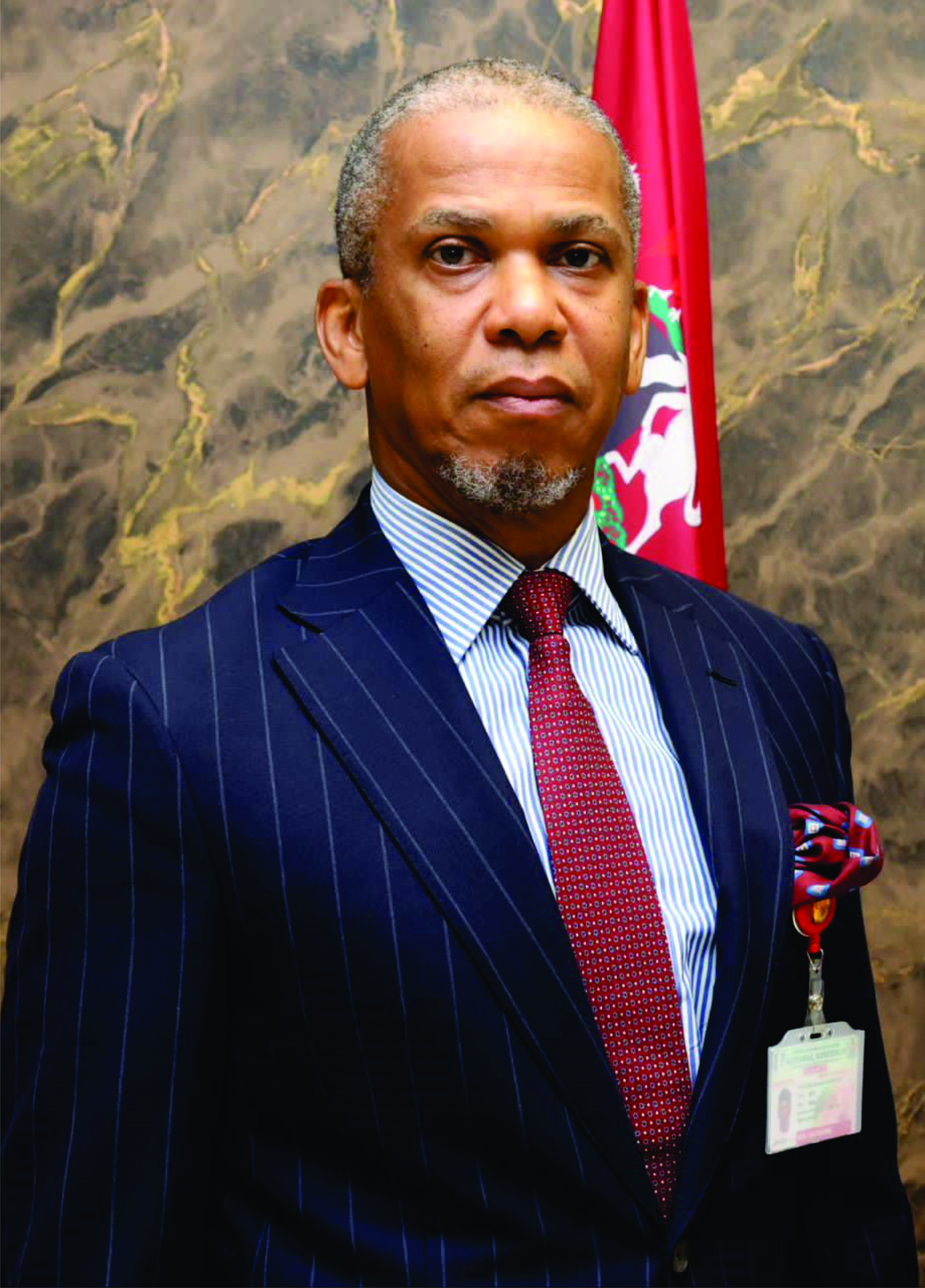

Senator for Delta Central Senatorial District
- Incumbent
- Assumed office 13 June 2023
- Preceded by: Ovie Omo-Agege

Personal details
- Born: 10 April 1962 (age 64) Lagos, Nigeria
- Party: All Progressive Congress (2014–present)
- Other political affiliations: Democratic People's Party (2010–2014); Peoples Democratic Party (1998–2010)
- Spouse: Eyamba Dafinone
- Profession: Accountant, Politician

Ede Dafinone (born 10 April 1962) is a Nigerian chartered accountant, politician, and philanthropist, notable for his contributions in the field of finance, involvement in Nigerian politics, and charitable activities. He is the senator representing Delta Central Senatorial District at the 10th National Assembly.

Ede Dafinone comes from the Dafinone family, they hold the Guinness World Record for the highest number of members in the Institute of Chartered Accountants in England and Wales (ICAEW). His father, David Omueya Dafinone, was Senator for the old Bendel South in the second republic.

Dafinone is a prominent figure in the Nigerian financial sector and has played an active role in shaping Nigeria's business landscape.

== Early life ==
Ede Dafinone was born to family of Late Chief (Senator) David Dafinone and Cynthia Dafinone. His siblings include Igho Omueya Dafinone, Duvie Omueya Dafinone, Daphne Omueya Dafinone, and Joy Omueya Dafinone. They all qualified as members of the Institute of Chartered Accountants in England and Wales between 1986 and 1999. Their father had earlier become a member of the institute in 1963.

== Educational background ==
Ede Dafinone received his education from various institutions, spanning both Nigeria and the United Kingdom. He began his academic journey at Corona School in Apapa, Lagos State, where he attended from 1968 to 1973, earning his first school leaving certificate. Following that, he pursued his secondary education at Kings College Lagos, from 1973 to 1978. Dafinone then ventured abroad to Rugby School in Warwickshire, United Kingdom, where he studied from 1978 to 1980.

Continuing his quest for knowledge, Dafinone enrolled at the Victoria University of Manchester in the United Kingdom, where he pursued his undergraduate studies from 1980 to 1983 and earned a Bachelor of Arts (Hons) degree in Economics. After completing his degree, he furthered his educational pursuits at the University of Exeter, also in the UK, bagging a Master of Arts in Economics in 1984.

Dafinone's dedication to continuous learning extended to the business realm as well. He attended the Lagos Business School in Lagos, Nigeria, enhancing his knowledge in the field of business and management.

He is a Fellow in both the Institute of Chartered Accountants in England and Wales (ICAEW) and the Institute of Chartered Accountants of Nigeria (ICAN), which were conferred upon him in 2000. Additionally, he is a Fellow of the Chartered Institute of Taxation of Nigeria, a distinction he has held since 1991.

== Career ==
Ede Dafinone has a career history spanning multiple sectors. He began his professional journey at Touche Ross & Co Chartered Accountants in London, where he gained experience from 1984 to 1988. Following this, he joined Crowe Dafinone, Chartered Accountants in Lagos in 1989. Over the years, he progressed within the firm, becoming a Partner in 1997 and later assuming the role of Deputy Managing Partner from 2007 to the present.

In addition to his role as a chartered accountant, Dafinone has held significant directorship positions in other sectors. Notably, he has served as a Director of Sapele Petroleum Limited, Ceddi Corporation Limited, and Sapele Integrated Industries Limited.

Dafinone has held various appointments in both the private and public sectors. Notable roles include serving as a Director of NEXIM Bank, Chairman of the Members of the Advisory Board for Africa ICAEW, Council Member of the Institute of Chartered Accountants of England and Wales (ICAEW) representing Africa, and Board member of the National Film and Video Censors Board. He has also served as the Chairperson of the Manufacturer's Association of Nigeria Export Promotion Group (MAN-EPG).

Ede Dafinone is the Chairman, National Executive Council of the Nigerian Conservation Foundation. He is a former chairman of the Manufactures Association of Nigeria Export Group, and Board of Trustee, Guild of Fine Artists of Nigeria

His is a member Board of Directors NEM Insurance, chairman of the Sapele Okpe Community Land Trust Association and Deputy Managing Partner Crowe

== Politics ==
Ede Dafinone has been actively involved in politics, playing a significant role in various political parties and elections. In 1998, Dafinone, alongside his late father, Chief Senator David Dafinone, became a founding member of the People's Democratic Party (PDP) in Delta State.

In 2006, he contested the Delta Central Senatorial PDP primaries, showcasing his willingness to actively participate in the democratic process and represent the interests of his constituency. He continued his political journey by participating in the Delta Central Senatorial bye-elections in 2013, this time as the Senatorial Candidate of the Democratic People's Party (DPP). This further highlighted his dedication to serving the people and making a difference within the political landscape.

Since 2014, Ede Dafinone has been a staunch member of the All Progressives Congress (APC). He was among the first group of individuals in Delta State to leave their former parties and join the APC.

On 1 November 2023, the Appeal Court dismissed the judgment of the National Assembly Petition Tribunal sitting in Asaba and upheld his election as the duly elected senator representing Delta Central Senatorial District.

== Senatorship ==
=== Committee memberships ===
- Vice Chairman, Senate Committee on Legislative Compliance
- Vice Chairman, Senate Committee on Local Content

=== Bills sponsored ===
- A bill for the establishment of Federal University of Education, Isiokolo, Delta State
- A bill for an act to alter the provisions of the constitution of the Federal Republic of Nigeria 1999 (to clearly define gross misconduct for purposes of impeachment)
- Ranching and anti-open grazing bill
- A bill for an act to provide for the establishment of a Federal University of Agriculture Technology, Orerokpe, Delta State
- A bill for an act to amend the Petroleum Training Institute, Effurun Act 2004, Cap P16 laws of the Federation of Nigeria and for other related matters, 2021.
- A bill for an act to alter Section 162 of the 1999 constitution (to increase derivation percentage from 13% to 25%)
- A bill for an act to alter the 1999 constitution (to make local governments to become truly independent and to put an end to the unlawful practice of caretaker committees)
- A bill for an act to alter section 230 of the 1999 constitution (to unbundle the judiciary and to decongest our courts.
- A bill for an act to establish a Federal University of Health Education, Ughelli, Delta State

=== Motions ===
- Motion calling for the extension of the Ujevwu-Itakpe railway line from Itakpe to Abuja and plea for one more train to be added to the fleet.
- Motion on the need to stop setting ablaze stolen crude oil vessels arrested in the Niger Delta
- Motion on the need to stop gas flare forthwith, and for govt to cut back on deforestation nationwide.
- Motion on the need for federal government to ensure that only legally established and functioning government parastatals and institutions find their way into the budget
- Motion on the need to teach cardio pulmonary resuscitation to secondary school and tertiary students, and NYSC
- Motion on the need to revisit and review extant economic policies/ floating exchange rate
- Motion on the need to build more refineries including modular refineries.
- Motion of SOS on the need to urgently fix the horribly dilapidated portions of the Effurun- Sapele- Benin road
- Motion on the need for the settlor in the pia to be mandated to fully commit to the 3% contribution to host communities and for NUPRC to tighten its compliance enforcement modus.
- Motion on the need for herdsmen menace in Delta Central to be addressed frontally and urgently too.
- Poor State of Road Infrastructure and Menace of Gully Erosion in Nigeria

== Community work ==
Dafinone serves as a Trustee of the Okpe Union, actively contributing to the welfare and development of the Okpe community. He holds the position of Chairman of the Sapele Okpe Community Land Trust Association, overseeing land-related matters and ensuring responsible management of community resources. He has also served as the Vice-Chairman of the Urhobo Progress Union - Management Board, playing a significant role in advancing the Urhobo community and promoting its interests.

In recognition of his contributions, Dafinone was honored with the traditional title of Ede of Okpe Kingdom.

== The Dafinone foundation ==
The Dafinone Foundation engages in social and community outreach, focusing on education, economic empowerment, and skills development. The foundation provides scholarships of all categories to Deltans, supporting individuals from primary school to postgraduate education. By offering financial assistance, the foundation enables deserving students to pursue their academic aspirations and unlock their potential. In addition to education, the Dafinone Foundation extends support to women and youths in micro, small, and medium enterprises (MSMEs) through the provision of micro-credit loans. These loans empower individuals to establish or expand their businesses, fostering entrepreneurship and economic growth within the community.

The foundation operates a Skill Acquisition Centre. This center offers training and equips women and youths with vital livelihood skills such as tailoring, hairdressing, adult education, welding, computer education, and catering, among others. Since its inception in 2007, the center has benefitted over 5,000 individuals, equipping them with valuable skills that enhance their employability and income-generating potential.

The Dafinone Foundation employs over 700 individuals across Delta State through Sapele Integrated Industries Ltd. The company specializes in rubber and allied products exports, providing employment opportunities and contributing to the local economy. Through the Foundation's multifaceted approach, Ede Dafinone demonstrates his commitment to addressing educational needs, promoting economic empowerment, and nurturing skills development within the community. The foundation's initiatives have positively impacted the lives of many, fostering social progress and creating opportunities for individuals to thrive.
