= Ovie Omo-Agege =

Nigerian lawyer and politician (born 1963)

Ovie Omo-Agege CFR

Deputy President of the Nigerian Senate
- In office 11 June 2019 – 11 June 2023
- President: Ahmad Lawan
- Preceded by: Ike Ekweremadu
- Succeeded by: Barau Jibrin

Senator for Delta Central
- In office 9 June 2015 – 11 June 2023
- Preceded by: Akpor Pius Ewherido
- Succeeded by: Ede Dafinone

Personal details
- Born: 3 August 1963 (age 63) Orogun, Mid-Western Region, Nigeria (now in Delta State)
- Party: Nigeria Democratic Congress
- Spouse: Rosemary Omo-Agege
- Education: University of Benin
- Profession: Politician; lawyer

Obarisi Ovie Omo-Agege CFR (born 3 August 1963) is a Nigerian lawyer and politician who served as the Deputy President of the Nigerian Senate from 2019 to 2023. He was the senator representing Delta Central Senatorial District from 2015 to 2023.

Omo-Agege was first elected to the Senate in 2015. He is from the Orogun clan of the Urhobo ethnic group in Ughelli North local Government area of Delta State. He emerged the Deputy President of the Nigerian Senate of the 9th National Assembly on 11 June 2019 after he defeated Ike Ekweremadu with a margin of 31 votes to win the second-highest leadership position of the National Assembly.

Omo-Agege was the first senator from Delta State to emerge as Deputy Senate President, and also the first Delta Central senator to be written by Perry.

== Early life ==
Omo-Agege was born on 3 August 1963 in Delta State. He attended St. George Grammar school, Obinomba-Umukwata in Ukwuani Local Government Area, Delta State.

== Education ==
He graduated in 1985 from the University of Benin with a degree in Law. He was called to the Nigerian bar in 1986.

In 2002, he obtained his master's degree in law from Tulane University Law School.

== Career ==
Omo-Agege was deployed to Kwara State for his National Youth Service Corps (NYSC). He completed his NYSC with the Directorate of Criminal investigation and intelligence, Nigerian Police Force, Kwara State Command. Omo-Agege started his career in law by working with Pat Okupa & Co. in Lagos in 1987.

In 1989, he co-founded a law firm; Agege & Co. Omo-Agege moved to the United States of America in 1990, where he worked as a foreign associate at Charles O Agege's law office in Los Angeles, California.

He was called to the State Bar of California, United States District Court and the United States Supreme Court, Washington, DC. He returned to Nigeria in 1992 to establish Omo-Agege & Associates where he was also senior partner. In 1996, he merged his firm Omo-Agege & associates in a partnership resulting in the name Agege & Esin.

== Political life ==
Omo-Agege started out in politics by contesting for the ticket to be a representative at the Delta State House of Representatives under the platform of the Peoples Democratic Party, a ticket he lost in the party primaries.

In 2003, then-governor of Delta State, James Ibori, appointed Omo-Agege as an executive assistant, a position he held for two years. He was later appointed as a commissioner for special duties by the governor. He ran for the office of the Governor of Delta State, but lost out at the People Democratic Party's primaries to Emmanuel Uduaghan who would later emerge as governor He was appointed as the Secretary to State Government of Delta State by Governor James Ibori in 2007. He ran for Senate in 2015 under the platform of the Labour Party. He was elected as a senator representing Delta central senatorial district on 28 March 2015.

He defected from the Labour Party to All Progressive Congress (APC) on 7 March 2017. He was re-elected as the senator representing Delta Central in 2019 general elections. On 11 June 2019, he emerged as the new Deputy Senate President of the 9th National Assembly with 68 votes cast to beat Senator Ike Ekweremadu with 37 votes. The South-South caucus of the APC, on Thursday 28 November 2019 chose the Deputy Senate President, Senator Ovie Omo-Agege, as the leader of the party in the region.

== Controversies ==
In 2018, he was accused of leading thugs to invade the Nigerian Senate Chambers and made away with the Senate Mace.

== Personal life ==
Omo-Agege is married to Rosemary Omo-Agege and they both have five children.

== Awards and recognitions ==
In October 2022, Omo-Agege was conferred with Nigerian national honour of Commander of the Order of the Federal Republic of Nigeria (CFR) by President Muhammadu Buhari.

== See also ==
- Barau Jibrin
- Muhammadu Buhari
