= Broderick Bozimo =

Nigerian lawyer

Alaowei Broderick Bozimo

Federal Minister of Police Affairs
- In office July 2003 – January 2007
- Succeeded by: Olu Adeniji (Interior)

Personal details
- Born: 20 January 1939 (age 87)
- Spouse: Rosaline Bozimo
- Occupation: Lawyer

Alaowei Broderick Bozimo (born 21 January 1939) is a Nigerian lawyer who was appointed Minister of Police Affairs by President Olusegun Obasanjo in July 2003. In January 2007 the Ministries of Police Affairs and Internal Affairs were merged into the new Ministry of the Interior, and Bozimo became a Minister of State in the new ministry.

Bozimo was born on 21 January 1939, son of a wealthy Ijaw businessman, Chief Jonah Oyandongha Bozimo. His father was the first secretary of Western Ijaw division and later the president of the customary court in Bomadi. Bozimo attended Urhobo College Effurun, Delta State for his secondary education. His wife is Rosaline Bozimo, who was his partner in the law firm Broderick Bozimo & Co and later become the Chief Judge of Delta State.

In May 2008 he denied rumors that he had accepted N17m as share of some alleged deal. He stated that the money had been given him as a minister to pay for emergency medical treatment in London.
