= 1991 Delta State gubernatorial election =

1991 gubernatorial election in Delta State, Nigeria

Delta gubernatorial election
- December 14, 1991
Nominee	Felix Ibru
Party	SDP
Elected Governor
Felix Ibru
SDP

The 1991 Delta State gubernatorial election occurred on December 14, 1991. SDP candidate Felix Ibru won the election.

== Conduct ==
The gubernatorial election was conducted using an open ballot system. Primaries for the two parties to select their flag bearers were conducted on October 19, 1991.

The election occurred on December 14, 1991. SDP candidate Felix Ibru won the election.
