= Hakeem: Seeking Justice =

- Directed by: JJC
- Starring: Deyemi Okanlawon, Regina Daniels, Eso Dike, Femi Branch, Ali Nuhu, Chioma Chukwuka Akpotha
- Release dates: August 1, 2025
- Running time: 120 minutes
- Country: Nigeria
- Language: English

Hakeem: Seeking Justice (previously titled Seeking justice (Hakeem's story)) is a 2025 Nigerian Nollywood action film. Written by Abdulrasheed Bello and Leo Oji and directed by Abdulrasheed Bello, the movie centers on former soldier Hakeem Balogun. Balogun returns home, finds his family murdered, and seeks justice for their death. The movie features popular Nollywood actors Deyemi Okanlawon, Regina Daniels, Zubby Micheal, Femi Branch, Chioma Akpotha and many others.

== Synopsis ==
The movie starts with Hakeem having a bad dream. He tells his wife about the dream and they visit their family doctor. Hakeem is informed by the doctor that he would have to go through surgery and it would cost 1.5 million naira. Monday calls Hakeem his old time friend about a security job that pays 1 million daily. Hakeem agrees to the idea and informs his wife.

Hakeem comes back home after the operation and finds his wife and his child soaked in blood; both die in the hospital, and Hakeem swears to avenge their death. The police and reporters believe the killings happened as a result of gang war in Abuja.

Hakeem kills every gang involved in the death of his wife and child, in search of the person who stabbed his child. He discovers the killers are involved in organ trafficking and their family doctor recommended his family as targets for harvesting. In the doctor's office, a reporter discovers documents signed by Hakeem and his wife designating them as organ donors. Hakeem goes to the doctor's house to discover that the senator was the main trafficker in the whole event. He kills the doctor, uploads the information online, and vows to kill the senator.

He kills the senator and surrenders to the police who charge and sentence him to life imprisonment for multiple counts of murder.

== Premiere ==
The movie was released and premiered on August 1, 2025 in all cinemas nationwide.

== Cast ==
- Deyemi Okanlawon
- Regina Daniels
- Zubby Michael
- Femi Branch
- Chioma Akpotha
- Boma Akpore
- Ninalowo Bolanle
- Eso Dike
- Gabriel Afolayan
- Ali Nuhu
