= Luke Chijiuba Ochulor =

Nigerian administrator

Military Administrator of Delta State
- In office 28 August 1991 – 2 January 1992
- Preceded by: John Ewerekumoh Yeri (Bendel State)
- Succeeded by: Felix Ibru

Luke Chijiuba Ochulor is a Nigerian retired air commodore who served as the first Military Administrator of Delta State from August 1991 to January 1992, after the state was created from part of Bendel State during the military regime of General Ibrahim Babangida. He handed over to the elected civilian governor, Felix Ibru, at the start of the Nigerian Third Republic.

Ochulor is of Igbo origin. He was born in Okpofe, Ezinihitte Mbaise Local Government Area, Imo State, Nigeria. As military administrator, he was tasked with establishing administrative structures for the new state while preparing for elections and transfer to civilian rule. He established Delta State University from the Abraka campus of Bendel State University and set up a commission to determine if the new university should be moved to Anwai, Asaba, a decision that could cause ethnic unrest.

In July 2003, Ochulor called for leaders of the Ijaw, Itsekiri and Urhobo ethnic groups in Delta State to work together for peace in the troubled Warri region. In 2009, as a member of the Imeobi (inner caucus) of the Imo State Council of Elders, he denied rumors that Governor Ikedi Ohakim was paying off to the elders to prevent criticism.
