= 1999 Delta State gubernatorial election =

1999 gubernatorial election in Delta State, Nigeria

- January 9, 1999
Nominee	James Ibori
Party	PDP	All People's Party (Nigeria)
Popular vote	558,332	296,902
Governor before election
Felix Ibru
SDP
Elected Governor
James Ibori
PDP

The 1999 Delta State gubernatorial election occurred in Nigeria on January 9, 1999. The PDP nominee James Ibori won the election, defeating the APP candidate.

James Ibori emerged PDP candidate.

== Electoral system ==
The Governor of Delta State is elected using the plurality voting system.

== Primary election ==
=== PDP primary ===
The PDP primary election was won by James Ibori.

== Results ==
The total number of registered voters in the state was 1,547,685. Total number of votes cast was 911,605, while number of valid votes was 899,287. Rejected votes were 12,318.

Candidate	Party	Votes	%
James Ibori	People's Democratic Party	558,332	65.28
All People's Party	296,902	34.72	
Total		855,234	100.00
Valid votes		855,234	98.58
Invalid/blank votes		12,318	1.42
Total votes		867,552	100.00
Registered voters/turnout		1,547,685	56.05
Source: Nigeria World, IFES, Semantics Scholar
