= Rosaline Bozimo =

Nigerian lawyer

Rosaline Patricia Irorefe Bozimo

Chief Judge of Delta State
- In office 3 April 2003 – 1 January 2011
- Succeeded by: Honorable Justice Abiodun Smith

Personal details
- Born: 1 January 1946 (age 80) Udu, Delta State, Nigeria
- Spouse: Alaowei Broderick Bozimo
- Education: Ahmadu Bello University
- Occupation: Lawyer, Judge

Rosaline Patricia Irorefe Bozimo (born 1 January 1946) is a Nigerian lawyer who was appointed Chief Justice of Delta State with effect from 23 March 2003. She retired on 1 January 2011 and was succeeded by Honorable Justice Abiodun Smith. During the tenure of Walter Onnoghen as the Chief Justice of Nigeria (CJN), she served as the Administrator, National Judicial Institute (NJI).

== Background ==
Rosaline Bozimo was born on 1 January 1946 in Warri South Local Government Area of Delta State. She attended St. Maria Goretti Grammar School, Benin City for her Secondary education, and then Urhobo College, Effurun. In September 1970 she was admitted to Ahmadu Bello University, Zaria, gaining a degree in law in 1973. She then went to the Nigerian Law School and was called to Bar in 1974.

After National Youth Service in Enugu and Onitsha in the then East Central State, she became a private legal practitioner in 1975. With her husband Alaowei Broderick Bozimo she was a founding partner of Broderick Bozimo & Co. She was briefly a member of the Judiciary of the old Bendel State as a Magistrate, before returning to private law practice (1978–1983). In December 1983 she was again appointed a Magistrate of Bendel State, becoming a Chief Magistrate in August 1988. When Delta State was created out of the old Bendel State in 1991, she became the first chairperson of the Tenders Board of the High Court of Delta State, and Chief Registrar of the state High Court in September of the same year. In December she was sworn in as a High Court judge.

The Military Administrator of Delta State, Colonel Bassey Asuquo, appointed her chairperson of the Armed Robbery and Firearms Tribunal, Effurun, Delta State. She was also chairperson of the Failed Banks Tribunal, Enugu Zone. After serving as Administrative Judge in three Judicial Divisions, she was appointed as the Chief Judge of Delta state with effect from 23 March 2003.

== Chief Judge, Delta State ==
In December 2003 in a bid to ease the congestion in prisons, Rosaline Bozimo set free 59 prisoners awaiting trial. She warned police against dumping suspected criminals in prisons without making real efforts to prosecute them. In September 2007 Bozimo sacked Agbor Chief Magistrate, Charles Maidoh based on allegations he had been collecting a N5,000 bribe for each application for bail he granted.

In November 2007, at the All Nigeria Judges Conference, she spoke about the National Judicial Council (NJC), which is charged with monitoring and evaluating judges. After giving a brief history of the NJC and discussing its roles, she gave a very positive appraisal, stating that standards of judicial conduct were now extremely high throughout Nigeria. In October 2007 Bozimo made a strong case for the financial autonomy of the judiciary in Delta State and canvassed for better working conditions for members of the state's judiciary.

In November 2008, Bozimo and Delta State Governor, Emmanuel Uduaghan approved establishment of sanitation mobile courts to prosecute sanitation offenders in the State. Due to repeated petitions over electoral irregularities, Bozimo appointed Local Government Election Tribunals for three zones of the state, adding a fourth in August 2009.
