= Michael Diden =

Nigerian politician

Member of the Delta State House of Assembly
- Constituency: Warri North

Chairman of the Delta State Oil Producing Areas Development Commission (DESOPADEC)

Chairman of Warri North Local Government Area

Personal details
- Born: Warri North, Delta State, Nigeria
- Party: All Progressives Congress (APC)
- Occupation: Politician, cleric

Michael Diden is a Nigerian politician. He was the Peoples Democratic Party (PDP) candidate for the Delta South senatorial district seat in the 2023 general election. He was defeated by Senator Joel Onowakpor Thomas.

== Early life ==
Diden was born in 1963 and is from Warri North in Delta State, Nigeria.

== Political career ==
Diden served as Chairman of Warri North Local Government Area and later became a member of the Delta State House of Assembly. He also served as a commissioner representing the Itsekiri ethnic nationality on the board of the Delta State Oil Producing Areas Development Commission (DESOPADEC) and later became chairman of the commission's board. He was the Peoples Democratic Party (PDP) candidate for the Delta South senatorial district in the 2023 Nigerian Senate election. He lost the election to Joel-Onowakpo Thomas, the candidate of the All Progressives Congress (APC).

== Political activities ==
In 2026, Diden joined the APC and contested the party's primary election for the Delta South senatorial ticket for the 2027 general election. Joel-Onowakpo Thomas was declared the winner of the primary, while Diden was reported as the runner-up.

== Religious work ==
Diden is an evangelist and the General Overseer of Mega Praise Church of Christ in Sapele, Delta State.
