= Amos Utuama =

Nigerian politician and academic (1947–2024)

Deputy Governor of Delta State
- In office 29 May 2007 – 29 May 2015
- Governor: Emmanuel Uduaghan
- Preceded by: Benjamin Elue
- Succeeded by: Kingsley Otuaro

Personal details
- Born: 5 June 1947 Delta State, Colony and Protectorate of Nigeria
- Died: 2 November 2024 (aged 77)
- Occupation: Politician

Amos Agbe Utuama (5 June 1947 – 2 November 2024) was a Nigerian politician and academic who served as deputy governor of Delta state from May 2007 to May 2015. Utuama died on 2 November 2024, at the age of 77.
