= Evelyn Omavowan Oboro =

Nigerian politician

- In office 2011–2019
- Constituency: Okpe, Sapele and Uvwie constituency

Personal details
- Born: 24 December 1971 (age 54) Nigeria
- Party: People's Democratic Party (APC)
- Education: Our Ladies High School, Effurun
- Occupation: Lawmaking

Evelyn Omavowan Oboro (born 1971) is a Nigerian politician and member of the Federal House of Representative. She represented Okpe, Sapele and Uvwie constituency of Delta State in the 7th and 8th National Assembly. She was elected on the platform of the People's Democratic Party (PDP)

== Early life and education ==
Oboro attended Alegbo Secondary School in Effurun, Delta State, where she obtained her West African School Certificate in 1988. She later studied at Delta State University where she earned a Bachelor's degree in Education in 1997. She subsequently obtained a Master of Public Administration in 2002 and later received a Bachelor of Laws (LL.B) degree from the same university in 2009. She received a Masters of Public Administration in 2002 and a degree in Law from Delta State University in 2009.

== Political career ==
Oboro was elected to the National Assembly of Nigeria as a member of the House of Representatives representing Okpe, Sapele and Uvwie Federal Constituency of Delta State. She served in the 7th and 8th National Assemblies under the platform of the People's Democratic Party (PDP).

During her time in office, she was involved in legislative activities and representation of her constituency at the federal level.

== Legislative activities ==
While serving in the House of Representatives, Oboro participated in legislative processes including discussions surrounding the establishment of the Federal University of Petroleum Resources Effurun in Delta State.The legislation was part of broader efforts by lawmakers to expand educational opportunities and strengthen petroleum-related research and training in Nigeria.

== Senatorial ambition ==
Ahead of the 2019 general elections, Oboro declared her intention to contest for the Delta Central Senatorial seat under the platform of the People's Democratic Party. Her candidacy attracted attention in Delta State politics, including reports of political tensions during the campaign period.
