= Federal College of Education (Technical), Asaba =

Public college in Asaba City, Delta State, Nigeria

- Other names: (Technical), Asaba
- Type: Public
- Established: 1987
- Affiliations: University of Benin (Nigeria)
- Location: Asaba, Delta State, Nigeria; 7.070735°N 4.818358°E
- Colours: Blue
- Website: Federal College

The Federal College of Education (Technical), Asaba is a federal government Higher Education institution located in Asaba City, Delta State, Nigeria. It is affiliated to University of Benin (Nigeria) for its degree programmes. The College began in 1987 at the former Asaba Technical College, (ATC) at its temporary site. Asaba is a rapidly developing Urban Centre and the administrative headquarters of Delta State. Currently, the Provost of the Federal College of Education (Technical), Asaba is Josephine Anene-Okakwa.

== History ==
The Federal College of Education (Technical) Asaba was established in 1987. In September 1987, the college opened for business at the current temporary location that had held the Asaba Technical College, Asaba. The College has relocated to its long-term location on Asaba's Ibusa Road. The business education, technical education, and vocational education schools have already relocated to the college's permanent location.

== Library ==
The school library is a modern library with information resources that supports teaching and learning.

== Courses ==
The institution offers the following courses;

- Agricultural Science
- Agricultural Science and Education
- Business Education
- Computer Science Education/Integrated Science
- Computer Science Education/Mathematics
- Education and Biology
- Education and Chemistry
- Education and Integrated Science
- Education and Mathematics
- Education and Physics
- Fine and Applied Art
- Home Economics
- Integrated Science/Mathematics Education
- Integrated Science/Physics
- Technical Education

The institution attache its students to different workplaces in order to gain practical experiences through the (SIWES) programme.

== Affiliation ==
The institution is affiliated with the University of Benin, Benin City to offer programmes leading to Bachelors of Science, Education, B.Sc(ed) in;

- Physics Education
- Biology Education
- Chemistry Education
- Mathematics Education
- Integrated Science Education
- Business Education
- Home Economic Education
- Agricultural Science Education
- Industrial Technical Education
