= Adego Erhiawarie Eferakeya =

Nigerian politician (1940–2019)

Senator of the Federal Republic of Nigeria
- In office May 2007 – May 2011
- Preceded by: Felix Ibru
- Succeeded by: Akpor Pius Ewherido
- Constituency: Delta Central

Personal details
- Born: 9 July 1940 Adagbrasa, Sapele, Delta, Nigeria
- Died: 16 April 2019 (aged 78) Amukpe, Sapele, Delta, Nigeria
- Party: People's Democratic Party (PDP)
- Profession: Medical Practitioner/Pharmacist, Politician

Adego Erhiawarie Eferakeya (9 July 1940 – 16 April 2019) was a Nigerian politician who was elected senator for the Delta Central Senatorial District of Delta State, Nigeria in April 2007. He ran on the People's Democratic Party (PDP) platform.

== Background ==
Adego Erhiawarie Eferakeya was born at Adagbrasa of Aghalokpe, Okpe Local Government Area, Delta State, Nigeria, on 9 July 1940.

He gained a B Pharm from the University of Ife in 1969, a PhD from the University of Kansas Medical Centre (United States) in 1975, and an MD (Pharmacologist and Toxicologist, Physician) from the University of Kansas in 1977. He became a Professor of Pharmacology and toxicology at the University of Benin in 2005.

Before running for the Senate, he was Chairman of the Hospital Management Board; Head of the Department of Pharmacology; Dean of the Faculty of Pharmacy; Secretary of the Urhobo Political Forum Elders Council and Grand Knight of the Sepele Sub-Council. He has authored or coauthored a number of papers, particularly dealing with pharmacy and blood pressure.

== Senate career ==
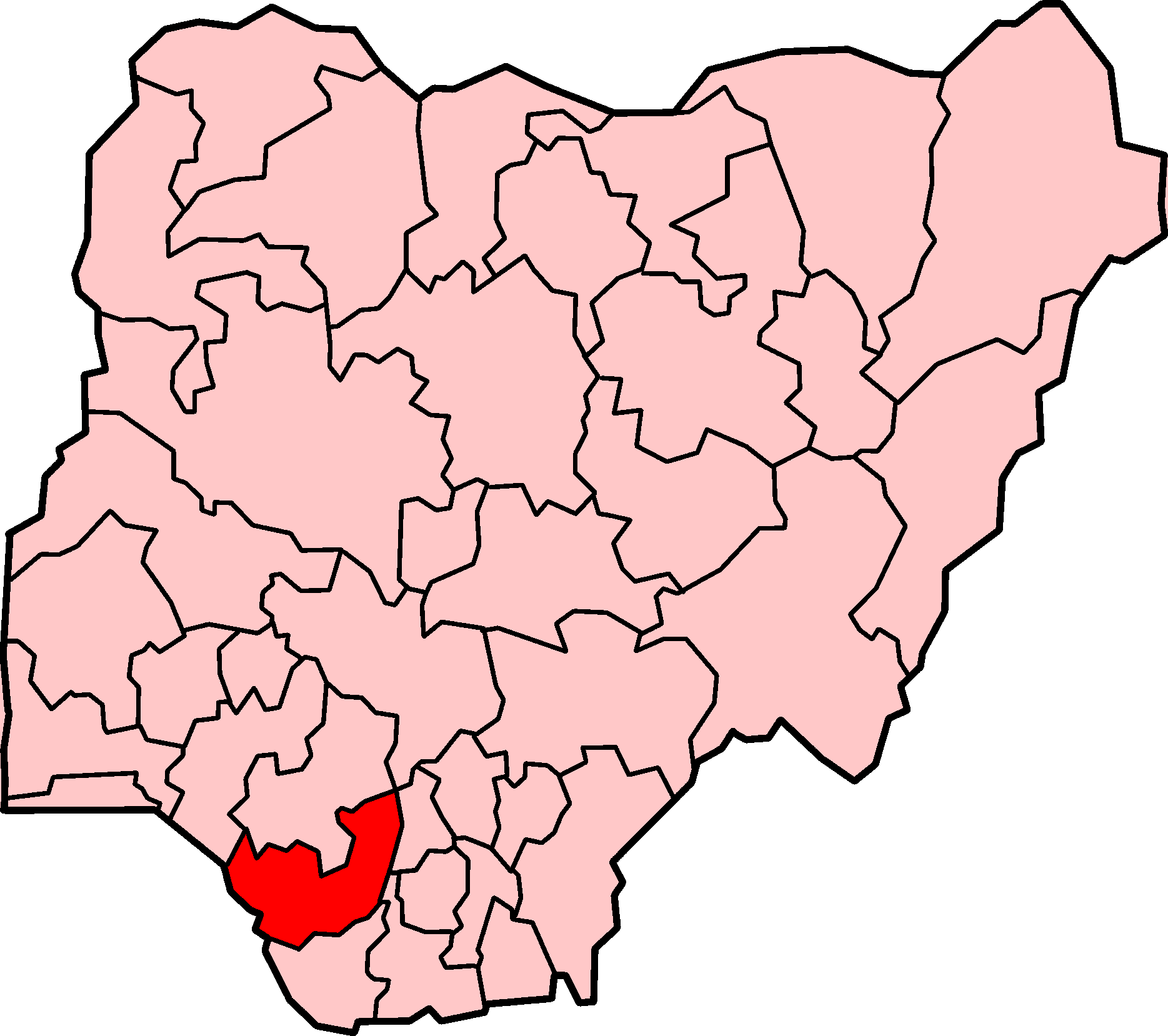
Delta State in Nigeria

Eferakeya was elected to the Nigerian Senate for the Delta Central constituency in 2007 on the platform of the People's Democratic Party (PDP). He was appointed to committees on Privatization, Health, Ethics & Petition, Establishment & Public Service and the Environment.

In March 2008, there was controversy about the N300 million unspent 2007 budget of the Federal Ministry of Health. Some members of the Senate Health Committee visited Ghana on a trip funded by the ministry. Eferakeya went on the trip, but denied receiving any of the N10 million allegedly handed to members of the committee. He called on the chairman of the committee, Senator Iyabo Obasanjo-Bello to explain what happened to the money. The Economic and Financial Crimes Commission (EFCC) arraigned former Health Minister, Adenike Grange and nine others over corruption, including Iyabo Obasanjo-Bello.

In May 2009, Eferakeya gave 100 motorcycles to youths in his constituency at a ceremony in his senatorial office in Eferakeya Hospital, Amukpe near Sapele, Delta State.

In July 2009, he was among senators who called for the creation of new states as part of the process to amend the 1999 constitution.

In October 2009, he led the Senate debate on a bill seeking to establish a national DNA data bank to help in the investigation of crime and identification of unknown corpses. The bill passed its second reading.

He objected to the 4 October deadline by the Federal government for ending the amnesty it had granted to militants in the Niger Delta, saying termination of the amnesty was premature.
