= David Dafinone =

Nigerian politician

David Dafinone OFR

Senator for Bendel South during the Nigerian Second Republic
- In office 1979–1983

Personal details
- Born: 12 March 1927 Sapele, Nigeria
- Died: 30 September 2018 (aged 91)
- Party: National Party of Nigeria (NPN) (Defunct)
- Education: Abeokuta Grammar School

David Omueya Dafinone OFR (12 March 1927 - 30 September 2018) was a Nigerian accountant and politician, who was a senator for Bendel South during the Nigerian Second Republic. He was a member of the National Party of Nigeria (NPN). Dafinone worked on various fact finding committees during the military administration of Yakubu Gowon.

== Life ==
David Dafinone was born on 12 March 1927, in Sapele, Nigeria. Son of Thomas Omueya and Agbami (nee Onomor) Dafinone. Dafinone finished his secondary education at Abeokuta Grammar School, he later became an employee of the colonial service working at the Northern Secretariat in Kaduna State. Dafinone worked in Records and Registration Department and when his immediate superior was promoted, he was appointed administrative officer in an acting capacity of the finance department. At the finance department, his function was to make treasury estimates of the funding needs of the native authorities within the Northern region.

On returning to Nigeria he worked as a manager for Delloittes, Lagos, from 1963 to 1966 In 1966, Dafinone founded D.O. Dafinone & Co (now Howarth Dafinone), a chartered accounting firm. In 1997 he became a consultant to the firm

He also served as an arbitrator for the government under the Ports Amendment Decree of 1969 which paved the way for the acquisition and compensation of port facilities owned by United Africa Company in Warri and Calabar. A year later he was in another committee, a tribunal constituted to probe the affairs of the Apapa road project. Dafinone's other high-profile public job was his appointment in 1971 by the Ministry of Internal Affairs, to investigate the corrupt practices at Niger Pools officially known as the Nigerian Pools Company, a Federal Government owned company. Initially he was appointed Sole Administrator. His report, later uncovered unethical charges such as forging of winning coupons after results had been announced. The investigation led to the closing of the firm and the imprisonment of some employees.

In 2003, the Nigerian Federal Government conferred on him one of its highest honours, that of the Officer of the Order of the Federal Republic (OFR).

He was re-elected for another 4-year term, which was cut short by the fall of the Second Republic, and the advent of military rule, on 31 December 1993, only 3 months into the term.

He died on 30 September 2018.
