= Daniel Reyenieju =

Nigerian politician

Reyenieju Daniel
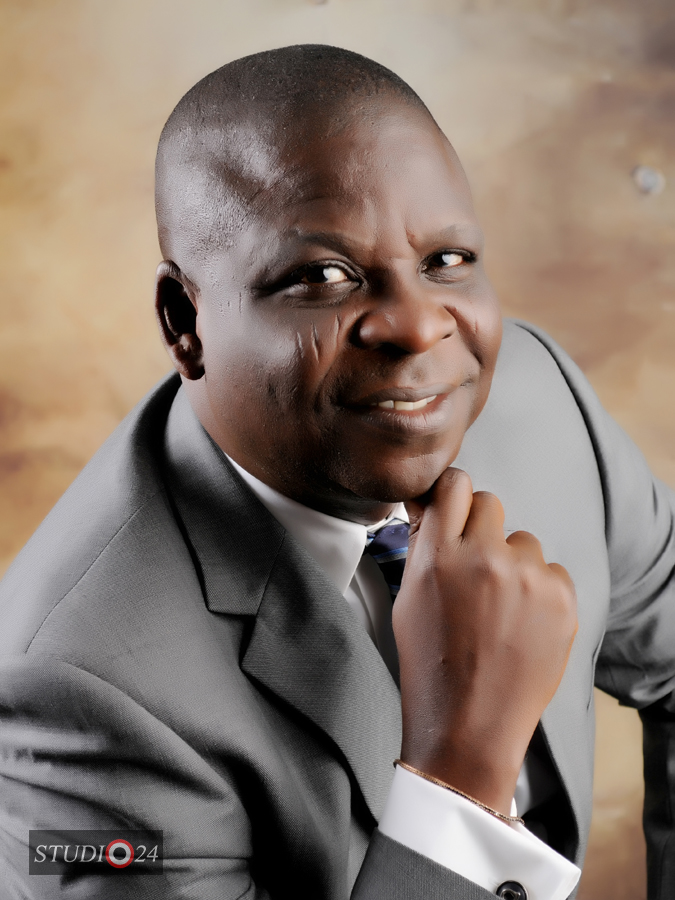
- Hon. Reyenieju Daniel

House of Reps Member

Member of the U.S. House of Representatives from Delta State
- In office 5 June 2007 – 5 June 2019
- Constituency: Warri Federal Constituency

Personal details
- Born: 18 December 1966 (age 59) Ogheye
- Party: All Progressives Congress (APC)
- Education: University of Uyo
- Occupation: Lawmaking
- Profession: Businessman, Politician
- Website: www.reyeniejudaniel.com

Reyenieju Oritsegbubemi Daniel (born 18 December 1966) is a 3rd-term member of the House of Representatives, Nigerian National Assembly. Born into the families of Pa George and Mrs. Elizabeth Reyenieju, both of Warri kingdom.

== Early life and education ==
Daniel was born on 21 November 1962 in Warrington, Delta State, Nigeria. He had his primary and post primary education at Omatseye and Iwere College, Koko respectively in then Warri Local Government Area of the Defunct Bendel State, now Warri North Local Government Area of Delta State. Following his quest for learning, he got admission into University of Uyo, Akwa Ibom State, where he obtained a Bachelor of Arts Degree in Philosophy (B.A) in 1988. Post Graduate Diploma in Public Administration from Obafemi Awolowo University, Ile-Ife, Osun State in 2014. Hon. Reyenieju is a recipient of several international awards and invitational training programs amongst which are; US-Africa International Leadership Award 2004 conferred on him by the US Department of State training in the International visitors' Programme.

== Work experience ==
Upon graduation, he secured employment with the oil firm, D.B.N Nig. Ltd, Warri, as a Public Relations Officer, and eventually was promoted to Personnel Manager. A position he occupied until 2003, when he voluntarily retired.

He then founded Nigitrade International Company Limited and Vio Interprom Services Limited.

In 2019, he was appointed by the Speaker of the House of Representatives, Rt. Hon. Femi Gbajabiamila as Special Assistant on Niger Delta / Oil and Gas.

== Political activism and career ==
In 2003, he was elected President of Itsekiri National Youth Council (INYC), a position he held until 2007.

He was appointed into 13% Derivation Committee, and then became involved in mainstream politics. He won the slot to represent Warri Federal Constituency under the banner of the People's Democratic Party in the 2007 elections. He was accordingly sworn in on 5 June 2007 as a member representing Warri Federal Constituency in the House of Representatives in the 6th Assembly. He was again re-elected as member representing Warri Federal Constituency in the House of Representatives in 2011 and 2015. Having lost the Delta State PDP House of Representatives Primaries for Warri Federal Constituency to Chief Thomas Ereyitomi on Wednesday 3 October 2018, he later clinched the ticket under the platform of Social Democratic Party (SDP). He defected to All Progressives Congress (APC).

== Legislative activities ==
In the 6th Assembly, he served as member of many House Standing Committees: Inter-Parliamentary Relations, Petroleum (Upstream), Navy, Aviation, Niger Delta, Airforce, FCT Area Councils, Legislative Budget and Research. and sponsored many bills.

In the 7th Assembly, he served as the chairman, House Committee on Inter-Parliamentary Relations and was elected the Vice Chairman, Commonwealth Parliamentary Association (Africa Region). He also served as member of Ad-hoc committee on the Constitutional Review and Petroleum Industry Bill (PIB). He was also the Chairman, Subcommittee on Petroleum Upstream on illegal bunkering and oil theft on Nigeria coastal line.

In the 8th Assembly (2015 -2019), he is serving as Member of House Committees on Appropriations, Ports, Harbours and Water Ways, Anti-Corruption, Gas Resources, Local Content, Foreign Affairs, and ICT. He was recently made the Chairman of an Ad-hoc Committee with the mandate to investigate the huge sums owed indigenous contractors by International Oil Companies (IOCs) and revenue losses to Nigeria.

Within an 11-year period of his membership of the Green Chamber of the National Assembly, he has sponsored 15 bills and moved 19 motions to draw the attention of the Federal Government to the plight of his people. 2 years into the 8th Assembly (2015 – 2017) alone, he has sponsored 9 bills while 1 has been passed and others are at different stages of the legislative process. Prominent among the Bills are the Bills for the Establishment of Maritime University, Okerenkoko, and Federal Polytechnic, Koko, Delta which passed second reading. He has also sponsored motions drawing the attention of government to the dumping of toxic waste substances, threat of ocean surge in Ogheye, the urgent need to dredge Escravos Bar Mouth amongst others.
