= Ned Nwoko =

Nigerian politician, lawyer and philanthropist

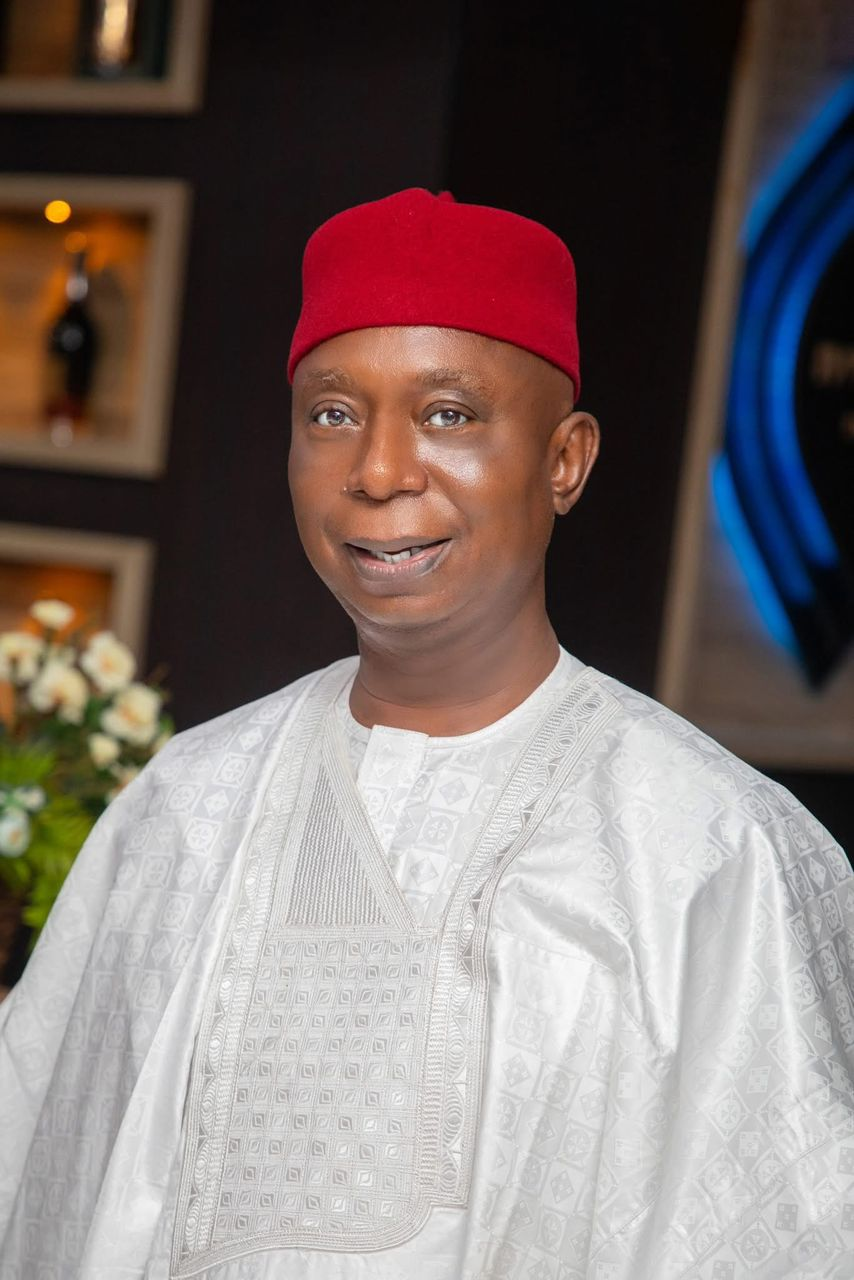

Senator representing Delta North
- Incumbent
- Assumed office June 2023
- Preceded by: Peter Nwaoboshi

Member of the House of Representatives of Nigeria
- In office 3 June 1999 – 3 June 2003
- Constituency: Aniocha/Oshimili

Personal details
- Born: Chinedu Munir Nwoko; 21 December 1960 (age 65)
- Party: All Progressive Congress (APC)
- Education: University of Keele; King's College London
- Website: senatornedmunirnwoko.com

Prince Chinedu Munir Nwoko (born 21 December 1960), popularly known as Ned Nwoko, is a Nigerian lawyer, philanthropist, and politician who serves as the senator representing Delta North senatorial district in the Nigerian Senate. He was a member of the House of Representatives between 1999 and 2003 representing Aniocha/Oshimili Federal Constituency, Delta State. In January 2020, he undertook a symbolic expedition to Antarctica to flag off a malaria eradication project.

He was elected to represent the people of Delta North senatorial district in 2023 in the Senate of Nigeria.

== Early life and education ==
Nwoko was born on 21 December 1960 into the Nwoko Royal Family, Idumuje Ugboko Kingdom in Aniocha North Local Government Area. He received primary and secondary education in Nigeria. He moved on to the United Kingdom, got his first degree in Law and History at the University of Keele, Staffordshire UK. He also attended King's College London, where he obtained an LLM in maritime and commercial law. Nwoko was subsequently called to the English bar, at Lincoln's Inn. He was awarded Honorary Doctorate degree in Letters (D.Litt) by Commonwealth University College, Belize, North America.

== Career ==
Nwoko began his legal career with a brief start at the Crown Prosecution Service and qualified as a solicitor in England and Wales. He worked at Kumars Solicitors and Pascaldiers & Co Solicitors before establishing Ned Nwoko & Co Solicitors in London.

Nwoko was secretary general, Nigerian legal practitioners UK, Member of the Law Society, England and Wales and was visiting adviser, citizens' advice bureau, based in London. At the peak of his legal sojourn in UK, he had the biggest black law firm in England and was recognized as the best black lawyer of African descent in England 1995.

== Politics ==
Nwoko returned to Nigeria in December 1998 and made an entry into Nigeria's political scene when he was elected member of the House of Representatives between 1999 and 2003. He represented Aniocha / Oshimili federal constituency, making an impressive showing in the legislative house.

Nwoko was instrumental to the initiation of the London and Paris Club Loans refund into Nigeria. He authored the reports that led to Nigeria government's discontinuation of monthly deductions from states' allocations and commencement of refunds to states. Through his law firm, Ned Nwoko Solicitors and his company, Linas International, he investigated the multinational creditors and discovered discrepancies in loan repayments, and this resulted in the refund of the first tranches of loan beginning from the Obasanjo administration. He also charged the federal government to court on behalf of 774 local governments for the refund of illegal deductions and obtained judgment of $3.2billion for the local governments. The federal government of Nigeria has refunded all the monies in line with the court judgment of 2013. Nigeria under the Buhari administration was able to overcome her economic recession culminating in the payment of backlog of salaries of public service workers and development of infrastructure. A total of US$20 billion has been refunded to states and local government because of his work. Nwoko also served on the Vision 2010 Committee and is a member of the capital market. He served as chairman of the External Committee of Vision 2010. Nwoko is also the chairman of Project Tourism Africa.

In 2023, Nwoko was elected as the senator representing Delta North senatorial district in the Nigerian Senate. His election was upheld by the Court of Appeal in Asaba.

On January 30, 2025, Nwoko announced his resignation from the PDP with plans to join Nigeria's ruling All Progressive Congress (APC).

== Controversies ==
=== Marital dispute and public accusations ===
The marriage between Nwoko and his wife, Regina Daniels, became the subject of public scrutiny from late 2025 when their private difficulties were aired publicly. Daniels, who married Nwoko in 2019, made a series of allegations against him via social media, claiming she had been subjected to manipulation and control. In November 2025, she alleged Nwoko was involved in murder, fraud, and land grabbing, though she did not provide specific evidence. She also claimed she had been in the relationship since the age of 17 and that Nwoko had introduced her to drugs.

Nwoko's communication team responded by dismissing the allegations as a coordinated campaign by his political opponents. They stated Daniels was 19 at the time of their marriage and that the union was conducted with her family's consent. His team also released a WhatsApp message dated October 2025 in which Nwoko expressed concern about Daniels' behavior, alleged drug use, and late-night visitors. The message included an ultimatum that she attend therapy or enter a rehabilitation center.

Nwoko's team further claimed that independent toxicology reports from Nigeria and South Africa confirmed the presence of multiple substances in Daniels' system. In January 2026, Nwoko shared a document on social media presented as a statement from a household nurse, who alleged that around September 2025, Daniels had requested help obtaining prescription medications and asked about lethal dosages. The nurse also claimed Daniels once instructed her to prepare a ketamine injection by heating it to form crystals, which the nurse said she refused to do. The nurse stated she never witnessed Nwoko physically assault his wife.

=== Land grabbing allegations ===
Nwoko had faced allegations of land grabbing in his hometown. In November 2025, he responded to these claims, describing them as "false and unfortunate." He explained that the land in question was legally allocated to him for the establishment of a University of Sports, which he said serves the community.

== Philanthropy ==
Nwoko is the founder of the Prince Ned Nwoko Foundation, through which he has supported youth empowerment and educational initiatives. In 2019, the foundation donated US$273,000 (₦100 million) for the rehabilitation of a road linking southeastern Nigeria to Abuja. He also initiated the Ned Nwoko Malaria Eradication Project, a foundation that supports malaria vaccine research through partnerships with African universities and research institutions. To raise awareness for malaria eradication, Nwoko undertook an expedition to the South Pole in January 2020. During this trip, he planted the Nigerian flag at the South Pole, an act that highlighted the call for malaria eradication in Africa. In addition, Nwoko founded Sports University, Idumuje-Ugboko, which was granted a license by the National Universities Commission (NUC) in 2022 as the first specialized sports university in sub-Saharan Africa.

== Personal life ==
Nwoko has several wives and many children. He was previously married Nollywood actress Regina Daniels with whom he has children. Following the end of their marriage in 2025,Regina Daniels became his former wife.

== Awards and recognition ==
- 2022: Social Impact Person of the Year – Leadership Newspaper
- Award for Media Excellence and Innovation – Delta State University
- Icon of Philanthropy Award – University of Nigeria, Nsukka
- 2018: Africa Value Awards – Effective Leadership and Youth Empowerment
- 2019: Peace Achievers Awards
- 2019: Prime Excellence Recognition Awards – Man of the Year
- 2019: Abuja AR Reporters Awards – Man of the Year
- 2019: Suncity Champions of Democracy Awards – Humanitarian Services
- 2019: University of Nigeria, Nsukka Nigeria Philanthropy Awards
