= Okpofe =

Autonomous community in Imo State, Nigeria

// Okpofe is an autonomous community located in Ezinihitte Mbaise local government area (LGA), in Imo State, Nigeria with common boundaries with Itu, Ezeagbogu, Ihitte, Amumara and Oboama autonomous communities. Okpofe is the centre of the Ezinihitte Mbaise clan, and it is the only town in Ezinihitte Mbaise that does not share a boundary with another local government area in Imo State. It is quite a unique town in Ezinihitte. It is also on record that the Roman Catholic Church was first established in Okpofe town in the year 1918 when the first crop of missionaries brought to the town held the first Catholic mass at the shrine of Inyama Oguegbe Ajero, who himself was the Second Paramount King of the ancient town after Chief Mbagwu. Ezinihitte Mbaise (by 2018, the town marked the centenary celebration of the existence of the Roman Catholic Church in Okpofe.) The Anglican Juniorate in Mbaise is located in Okpofe too.

Its first traditional ruler in the modern era was the late Eze Ewulonu Modestus C. Anyankah, who ascended the throne at the age of 42, born by an Umuimee daughter to an Okwu man. Today, the traditional affairs of the town are under the care of His Royal Highness Eze Sir Reginald Jesse Chukwuma Aguwamba, who has been described as "the man of the people", and whose uncle was the last warrant chief that also crowned the late Eze Anyankah in the late 1970s. Eze Reginald Aguwamba was born by an Umuimee man. (Take note of the importance of this village Umuimee in the history of Ezeship in Okpofe). A surveyor by profession, Eze Aguwamba retired voluntarily from the Owerri Capital Development Authority to serve his fatherland as the Eze Oha II. He has, so far, led the community to an enviable position in the Oji Ezinihitte Festival that no other community in the clan has attained during the 2013 Oji Festival at Okpofe and the recently concluded one at Ezeagbogu. Within his first few months in office, some other developmental projects from the Imo State Government came into Okpofe.

The story of Okpofe cannot be complete without mention of the late Sydney Ngozi Njoku. He almost single-handedly built Okpofe Secondary School, Okpofe Town Hall and the Okpofe Post Office. He made immense financial contributions for these projects. He undertook and concluded several human and structural developmental projects in Okpofe, Ezinihitte and Imo State at large. "Singoz", as he was popularly called, died in 1982 at the age of 42. Also the contribution of late Hon Chief Dr Athanasius Nwaogazi Awuja JP MON who was born on November 7, 1933, to the family of late chief awuja eke of umueche, Chukwuoma Okpofe, a role model emulated by several Okpofe sons and daughters, he highly promoted technical education, many parents advised their wards to be as diligent in study as nwogazi awuja. he above all gave scholarships to many children of Okpofe who are today prominent citizens of Nigeria. Chief A N awuja and his Lolo madam Grace u awuja (nne ebegbulem enyinna) established the sacred Heart Hospital Okpofe to afford women opportunity for health care within their locality. In recognition of his immeasurable spirit of patriotism, philanthropism and generous contribution to the development of Okpofe autonomous community, late HRH Eze E.M.C anyankah ezeoha 1 of Okpofe on 26 December 1985 conferred on him a chieftaincy title as the aladimma of Okpofe. In 1993, he received another honour from the imo state government as JUSTICE OF PEACE (JP), to crown it all the president of the federal republic of Nigeria-His excellency,Olusegun Obasanjo conferred on him a national honour of MON in 2006

== Villages ==
Okpofe, which is broadly divided into two sections—Umuerim and Imoko, is made up of 12 villages namely:

- Chukwuoma
- Umuafoeze
- Umuocha
- Umumgbadi
- Okwu
- Okpuala
- Umuoma
- Umuimee
- Umuotirikpo
- Dimukwu
- Umuke
- Okwuaba

(Note that this list is not in order of seniority. The first six villages belong to Imoko while the last six villages belong to Umuerim.)

== Market ==
Okpofe has a central market called Afo-Ekiri Market, which is located at the centre of the entire community. It is also called Ahia Afor because it is held on Afor days. The second market, which is at Umuke village, is called Nkwo-onyeokamma. It is held on Nkwo days.

== Churches ==
The two largest churches in Okpofe are Christ the King Catholic Church and St. Mark's Anglican Church. There are also the Apostolic, Assemblies of God, Christ Chosen, Christ Faith, Seventh-Day Adventist, Cherubim and Seraphim, Christ Solution Ministry, and more.

== Schools ==
Okpofe Community has a secondary school (Okpofe Secondary School), and an Anglican Juniorate (Mary Sumner Juniorate), three primary schools (Central School also known as CKS, Community School, and Group School Okpofe), and a private Secondary School (Bro Fab).

== Other facilities ==
- Micro-finance bank
- Okpofe town hall
- Primary health care center
- Private hospitals and maternity clinics
- Post office
- Business centres
- Private primary and kindergarten schools
- Restaurants and other eateries

== Okpofe Improvement Union (OIU) ==
The Okpofe Improvement Union is an association of Okpofe indigenes wherever they reside within the country and in the diaspora. OIU Home and Abroad is the apex central town union and Community Development Council (CDC) of Okpofe. It is the policy-making organ of the community. OIU Home and Abroad has affiliate branches in: Port Harcourt, Owerri, Aba, Enugu, Lagos, Onitsha, Warri, Calabar, Kaduna, Ibadan, Abuja, Kano, New York City, New Jersey (as Okpofe Dev. Association—ODA), Washington DC/Maryland/Virginia, and Canada. The OIU Home and Abroad coordinates and contributes to the development and improvement of the community. It is currently headed by Dr Chief Emmanuel Ohuakanwa Uba as President-General (PG). Past PGs include Chief Ralph Okeahialam Ntiajuka, Chief Eric I. C.Nwankwo, Chief Dr Festus Ekpewerechi Ngumah amongst others.

=== Age grades ===
An age grade in Okpofe is an association of Okpofe men who were born within a given year-range, usually three years, and are therefore of a given age bracket. Age grades play key roles in development and promotion of the tradition and culture of the community. The following are the age grades in Okpofe:

- Chikwadoro
- Ugochukwu
- Igwebuike
- Ndiekwoaba
- Ezinwanne
- Ogueri
- Udo-Abia
- Ahaoma
- Akurulo
- Udokamma
- Ariri eri mba
