= Akpor Pius Ewherido =

Nigerian politician

Senator of the Federal Republic of Nigeria from Delta Central Senatorial District
- In office May 2011 – 30 June 2013
- Preceded by: Adego Erhiawarie Eferakeya
- Succeeded by: TBD

Personal details
- Born: 4 May 1963 Ughelli, Delta State, Nigeria
- Died: 30 June 2013 (aged 50)
- Relations: Aloysius Ewherido, Fr.Anthony Ovayero Ewherido, Francis Omejevwe Ewherido, Ufuoma Ewherido, Emmanuel Ogaga Ewherido, Jude Ewherido, Edesiri Mark Ewherido

Akpor Pius Ewherido (4 May 1963 – 30 June 2013) was a Nigerian politician. He was elected Senator for Delta Central Senatorial District in the April 2011 national elections, running on the Democratic People's Party (DPP) platform.

== Background ==
Born in Ughelli, Ewherido was Urhobo by origin. Born as third child in a family of 8 boys He attended Notre Dame College, Ozoro and Urhobo College, Effurun, He went on to the University of Ife where he studied Philosophy. After his National Youth Service, Ewherido became a businessman in Warri. He also studied law at the University of Benin, and was later called to the Bar.

== Political career ==
Ewherido joined the United Nigerian Congress Party (UNCP) during the Nigerian Third Republic. After the transition to democracy was aborted by Sani Abacha, he left politics and returned to business. In 1998, he joined the People's Democratic Party (PDP) and in April 1999, he was elected to represent the Ughelli South constituency election in the Delta State House of Assembly. He was appointed Deputy Speaker of the House when it convened in June 1999. From 15 May 2000 until 20 March 2001 he was leader of the Assembly. Ewherido was reelected in April 2003, and was Deputy Speaker of the Assembly from May 2003 until May 2007. In the 2006 PDP primaries he was a contender to be candidate for Governor of Delta State in the April 2007 election, but was unsuccessful in the primaries.

Ewherido left the PDP in order to compete for the Delta Central Senate seat on the DPP platform. In the DPP primary he was elected the candidate by a narrow margin, winning 125 votes to his opponent's 108. In the April 2011 election, he won 102,313 votes, ahead of Amori Ighoyota of the PDP who gained 85,365 votes.
