= Regina Daniels =

Nigerian actress

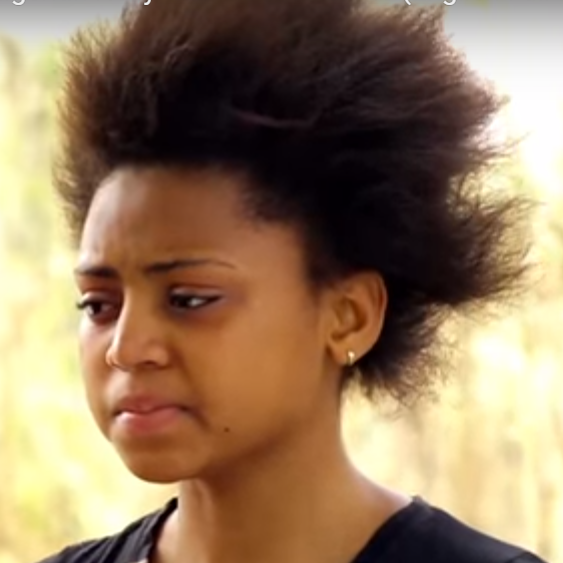
- Born: Regina Daniels; 10 October 2001 (age 25); Lagos, Lagos State, Nigeria
- Citizenship: Nigerian
- Education: Igbinedion University (BA in Mass Communication)
- Years active: 2012–present
- Children: 2
- Mother: Rita Daniels

Regina Daniels (born 10 October 2001) is a Nigerian actress and film producer. As a child actor, she starred as Onyeure in the drama film Dumebi in School (2014), Kenya Obi in Merry Men 2 (2019), and Yewande in the action film Hakeem: Seeking Justice (2025).

== Early life ==
Regina Daniels was born in Lagos, Lagos State, Nigeria on 10 October 2001. Her mother is Rita Daniels, a film producer and businesswoman, while her father is Jude Ojegwu. She was raised in Asaba, Delta State with her five siblings; three brothers and two sisters.

Regina had her bachelor's degree in mass communication at Igbinedion University in 2018. In 2024, she bagged a bachelor's degree in psychology from Universidad Azteca in Mexico.

== Career ==
Daniels started movie making at the age of seven. She got support from her mother and her siblings. Her first movie was Marriage of Sorrow which earned her 10,000 Nigerian Naira. Daniels featured in a Nollywood movie titled "Miracle Child" in 2010. Daniels has been featured in a comedy skit by Ofego on two occasions on his YouTube channel using archive footage.

In January 2019, Daniels was appointed Atiku Abubakar’s Youth Campaign Coordinator. In February 2020, Daniels launched a magazine named after her at a hotel in Abuja.

== Controversies ==
=== Cyber-crime/fraud allegation ===
A plot to implicate Daniels in a scam involving alleged intimate photos of an aspiring actress started on 20 November 2017. A person claimed that she had sent photos to Daniels and was then asked to meet with a movie producer who would train her on being a better actress. After the meeting Daniels was said to have been angry with the victim inciting that the aspiring actress should have offered herself to the producer. Two days later Daniels denied all allegations, and said a fan was using her name to dupe the actress. On 23 November 2017, the impersonator was arrested by the police and Daniels was exonerated.

=== Separation rumours ===
By February 2025, it was rumored that Regina had separated from her husband, Ned Nwoko, after she deactivated her Instagram account and later returned, with noticeable changes to her official Instagram bio: she removed Ned's name and deleted all pictures of him. This happened amid rumors that Nwoko allegedly impregnated actress Chika Ike and planned to make her his seventh wife, a claim that both Nwoko and Chika Ike denied.

== Personal life ==
On April 1, 2019, e-Nigeria! a news website made a publication stating that Ned Nwoko (a Nigerian businessman) was the financial sponsor of Daniels. The publication went viral and was cited by many news websites in Nigeria and Kemi Filani News. Etinosa Idemudia in response to media critics responded on her social media handle that it is an honor that Daniels was made the 6th wife of the senator elect instead of a "side chic". On 27 April 2019, Ned Nwoko received an honorary doctorate degree from Federal University of Petroleum Resources, Effurun. Harrysong anchored the event where both Daniels and Ned were spotted dancing together. She was widely been criticized by fans and Nigerians on her alleged marriage to the 59-year-old.

On 29 June 2020, she gave birth to a baby boy for Nwoko. Two years later, on 29 June 2022, she gave birth to a second child.

== Filmography ==
- "Clash of Spirits" (2021)
- "A Little Favour" (2022) as Rebecca
- "Reversal" (2022) as Ann
- "Don't Give Up on Us" (2022) as Tamara
- Dumebi in School (2014) as Onyeure
- Python Girl (2015)
- The Bat-Man
- The Jericho
- Plantain Girl (2015)
- Jaja the Great
- Enemy within// Directed by Mayor Ofoegbu
- The Jericho (as producer)
- Twins Apart (as producer)
- Tears of Ojiugo
- Amara Queen of the jungle (2016)
- Resident Evil// Directed by Mayor Ofoegbu
- Wipe your Sorrows
- Royal Covenant
- Traditional War (Part 1)
- Stronger Than the Gods
- The King and The Python
- Hanging Coffin
- Evil messenger 1 and 2
- Queen Rebeca
- Shekira:the selfie queen (2019)
- Eziama: Land of blood
- Royal dreams
- Pains of Royalty
- Land of slaves
- Slave girl
- The stolen Beads
- Naked sacrifice
- Merry Men 2
- Love and Trust (2023)
- City Girl" (2023) as Isabella
- The Plea" (2024)
- My first love” (2024)
- When you love June (2024) as June
- Ejiro's wish (2024) as Efe
- Lovers and Foes (2024) as Zam
- Spider Girl (2016) as Spider Girl
- The Waiter (2024) as Idara

== Awards and nominations ==
Year	Award	Category	Result	Ref
2017	Best of Nollywood Awards	Revelation of the Year –female	Nominated	
2021	Net Honours	Most Searched Actress	Nominated	

== See also ==
- List of Nigerian film producers
