= Great Ogboru =

Nigerian politician (born 1958)

- Born: Great Ovedje Ogboru; 10 April 1958 (age 68); Port Harcourt, Nigeria
- Education: The Chartered Institute of Marketing (BA); Huron University USA in London (MBA); University of Kent (MA)

Great Ovedje Ogboru (born 10 April 1958) is a Nigerian businessman and politician who was the gubernatorial candidate for the Alliance of Democracy, the Democratic Peoples' Party and the Labour Party in the 2003, 2007 and 2015 Delta State governorship elections. He was also the gubernatorial nominee for the All Progressives Congress (APC) in the 2019 Delta State governorship elections.

== Early life and education ==
Ogboru was born on 10 April 1958 in Port Harcourt. Ogboru received early education at Municipal Primary School, Port Harcourt, but left the city to continue studies at a primary school in Abraka. He, however, finished his primary education at Oharisi Primary School, Ughelli. He attended Government College, Ughelli, from 1971 to 1975. He served as a teacher and while working, he obtained an external advanced level certificate in 1980.

While he was in the United Kingdom, he attended The Chartered Institute of Marketing, London. Thereafter, he attended Huron University USA in London, a branch of Huron University in South Dakota, earning a Master of Business Administration degree. He also obtained a master's degree in international relations at the University of Kent in Canterbury.

== Career ==
In 1984, he was employed as a marketing officer in a fishing company in Lagos. In 1987, he left the fishing firm to start up his own private fishing business, Fiogret Ltd, which later grew and expanded to some other African countries. At the time he was involved in the fishing business, he ventured into other businesses, which included a Warri based furniture company and Bureau de Change.

In April 1990, Ogboru was indicted in the failed coup attempt of Gideon Orkar, he fled the country through the Seme border with help from his brother, Turner Ogboru. The military administration subsequently detained Turner and harassed Ogboru's siblings and did not discourage the looting of his properties by soldiers. Ogboru initially fled to London but later moved to Angola and Namibia.

Ogboru returned to Nigeria in June 2000 and joined the democratic process with the establishment of the South-South Rainbow Coalition (SSRC). He established himself as a viable opposition candidate to Delta's governor, James Ibori, under the Peoples Democratic Party (PDP) and contested the governorship elections in Delta State in 2003. In the 2007 election, Ogboru contested for governorship under the flag of the Democracy People Party (DPP) against Emmanuel Uduaghan of the Peoples Democratic Party (PDP) and lost to Emmanuel Uduagha again in the 2011 election, though he contested under the umbrella of the Labour Party. In the 2015 Delta State governorship election, Ogboru contested for governorship under the umbrella of the All Progressive Congress (APC). He was defeated by Ifeanyi Okowa of the Peoples Democratic Party (PDP). In the 2019 governorship election of Delta State, Ogboru, under the umbrella of the All Progressive Congress (APC) lost to Ifeanyi Okowa.
