= Delta Central senatorial district =

Senatorial district in Nigeria

Delta Central senatorial district in Delta State, Nigeria covers 8 local governments which include Ethiope East, Ethiope West, Sapele, Okpe, Ughelli North, Ughelli South, Udu and Uvwie. The headquarters (collation centre) of Delta Central senatorial district is Udu. Deputy President of the 9th Senate, Ovie Omo –Agege is from Delta Central senatorial district. He is a member of the All Progressives Congress.

== List of senators representing Delta Central ==
Senator	Party	Year	Assembly	Electoral history
Fred Aghogho Brume	PDP	1999 - 2003	4th	
Felix Ibru	PDP	2003-2007	5th	
Adego Erhiawarie Eferakeya	PDP	2007 2011	6th	
Akpor Pius Ewherido	DPP	2011-2013	7th	Died 30 June 2013 leaving his seat in the Senate vacant
Ovie Omo-Agege	APC	2015–2023	8th 9th	Deputy President of the 9th Senate
Ede Dafinone	APC	2023-present	10th	
