= Delta South senatorial district =

Senatorial district in Nigeria

Delta South senatorial district in Delta State, Nigeria, covers 8 local governments which comprise Bomadi, Burutu, Isoko North, Isoko South, Patani, Warri North, Warri South and Warri South West. The headquarters (collation centre) of Delta South is Isoko South Local Government. The current representative of Delta South senatorial district is James Manager of the People’s Democratic Party, PDP.

== List of senators representing Delta South ==
Senator	Party	Year	Assembly
Stella Omu	PDP	1999 - 2003	4th
James Manager	PDP	2003 - 2023	5th 6th 7th 8th 9th
Joel-Onowakpo Thomas	All Progressive Congress	2023- Present	10th Nigeria National Assembly
