= James Manager =

Nigerian politician

Senator of the Federal Republic of Nigeria from Delta South Senatorial District
- In office 2003 – 13 June 2023
- Preceded by: Stella Omu
- Succeeded by: Joel-Onowakpo Thomas
- Constituency: Delta South

Chairman of the Delta State People's Democratic Party
- In office 1998–1999
- Preceded by: Inaugural holder
- Succeeded by: Pius Sinebe

Personal details
- Party: People's Democratic Party (PDP)
- Profession: Politician

James Manager is a Nigerian politician of the People's Democratic Party who served as a senator representing Delta South Senatorial District of Delta State in the Nigerian Senate from 2003 to 2023.

== Background ==
Manager attended Epiekiri Primary School Ogbeinama in 1974. He had his secondary school education at FSLC School of Basic Studies, Port Harcourt in 1983. Manager has an LLB Hons in Law from Ahmadu Bello University in 1986, then he graduated from the Nigerian Law School in 1987 and he got LLM in Law from the University of Lagos in 1989.

== Political career ==
Manager was elected to the Senate on the People's Democratic Party ticket for the Delta South Senatorial District in 2003. He was appointed to the Works committee, Niger Delta committee and Judiciary, Human Rights and Legal Matters committee.

In May 2009, he raised the issue of the damage caused by the continued military bombardment of communities in the oil-rich Gbaramatu clan, Warri South Local Government Area of Delta State, leading to a senate resolution urging the Committee on Defence and Army to take action. He was joined in his protest against the violence by former Senator Fred Brume, who called it "an unequal battle that is drastically de-populating several parts of the region. In September 2009, Senator Manager urged President Umaru Yar'Adua to appoint someone familiar with the region as Minister of the newly created Ministry of Niger Delta.

Manager supported finding a diplomatic solution to the Joint Task Force attacks on Ijaw villages, saying war was not the right approach.

Manager successfully ran for re-election as Delta South Senator on the PDP platform in the April 2011 elections.

In 2019, Manager was re-elected for the fifth time as a Senator.

== Controversies ==
Manager defeated the former Delta State governor and candidate of the All Progressives Congress (APC) in the election, Dr Emmanuel Uduaghan with a total of 258, 812 votes making it his fifth term in Office. Uduaghan challenged Managers victory via the tribunal, seeking the panel to declare him winner of the February 23rd, 2019 National Assembly election. In an unanimous judgement, which lasted over three hours, the panel cancelled the election and ordered for a fresh election in the district within 90 days. In November 2019, An Appeal court in Benin city upheld Managers Victory. The three-man appeal panel led by Justice Jaro Adamu in Benin-city set aside the judgment of the tribunal ordering for re-run election, saying Uduaghan claims were mere allegations and not adequately substantiated.
