= Emmanuel Uduaghan =

Nigerian politician (1954–2026)

Emmanuel Eweta Uduaghan
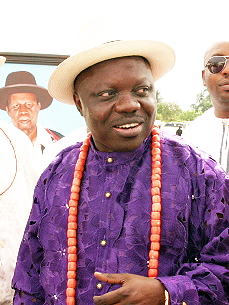
- Uduaghan in 2012

3rd Governor of Delta State
- In office 29 May 2007 – 29 May 2015
- Deputy: Amos Utuama
- Preceded by: James Ibori
- Succeeded by: Arthur Okowa Ifeanyi

Personal details
- Born: 22 October 1954 Warri North, Delta State, Nigeria
- Died: 19 October 2026 (aged 71)
- Party: PDP (since 2020)
- Other political affiliations: APC (2018-2020)
- Spouse: Roli Uduaghan
- Education: University of Benin, Nigeria

Emmanuel Eweta Uduaghan (22 October 1954 – 19 October 2026) was a Nigerian politician and medical doctor who served as Governor of Delta State from 2007 to 2015. He assumed office via an inconclusive election on 29 May 2007 and was a member of the People's Democratic Party (PDP). He was reelected and sworn in for a second tenure in 2011.

A medical doctor by profession, prior to becoming governor, he was the Commissioner for Health, Delta State and the Secretary to the State Government.

== Background ==
Emmanuel Eweta Uduaghan was born on 22 October 1954 in Warri North Local Government Area in Delta State of Itsekiri origin. He attended Federal Government College, Warri (1968–1974), and the University of Benin (1975–1980) earning a Bachelor of Medicine and Surgery (MBBS) degree, and a Diploma in Anaesthesia. He was married, with two children.

He began work in 1983 at the Delta Steel Company, as a medical officer. From 1989 to 1994, he worked in a number of hospitals including Westend Hospital, Warri; Benoni Hospitals, Benin City and Shell Hospital, Ogunu, where he was a consultant anaesthesiologist. In 1994 he set up a private medical practice. He has held various positions in the Nigerian Medical Association in Warri, Bendel State and Delta State. He was also active in the Junior Chamber International (Jaycees) leadership development organization.

== Political career ==
Emmanuel Uduaghan was a founding member and chairman of the All Nigeria Congress Association for the Warri South Local Government Area, a founder and executive member of the Grassroots Democratic Movement (GDM), and a foundation member of the PDP.

On 6 August 1999, the Governor of Delta State James Onanefe Ibori appointed Emmanuel Uduaghan as Commissioner for Health, Delta State. In this position he improved the pay of medical staff and upgraded infrastructure. On 6 June 2003, Uduaghan was appointed Secretary to the Delta State Government. In November 2008, Uduaghan and State Chief Justice Rosaline Bozimo approved establishment of sanitation mobile courts to prosecute sanitation offenders in the State.

He ran again for governor in the 26 April 2011 elections, and was reelected. He polled 525,793 votes, while Chief Great Ogboru of the Democratic People's Party (DPP) was the runner-up with 433,834 votes.

On 29 August 2018 he officially announced he has left PDP for APC. However, in 2020, he returned to the PDP. In 2022, he announced his retirement from politics.

In 2019, Uduaghan lost the bid for the Delta South Senatorial District election to Senator James Manager of the People's Democratic Party (PDP), who bagged a total of 258, 812 votes.

On 9 May 2025, Uduaghan rejoined the All Progressives Congress (APC). He was officially presented with his membership card at his residence in Delta State by party leaders, including Alero Tenumah, the Delta South APC Women Leader, and George Ino, Chairman of APC Ward 6 in Abigborodo. His membership card number was WRN//023/32001.

== Personal life and death ==
Uduaghan's wife, Roli, is the daughter of Brig. General Sunny E. Tuoyo (Rtd), a one time military administrator of Ondo State.

Uduaghan died on 19 October 2026, after an undisclosed brief illness, at the age of 71.

== See also ==
- List of governors of Delta State
