= James Ibori =

Nigerian politician (born 1959)

His Excellency James Onanefe Ibori CON

2nd Governor of Delta State
- In office 29 May 1999 – 29 May 2007
- Deputy: Benjamin Elue
- Preceded by: Walter Feghabo
- Succeeded by: Emmanuel Uduaghan

Personal details
- Born: 4 August 1959 (age 67) Oghara, Delta State, Nigeria
- Education: University of Benin, Nigeria

James Onanefe Ibori (born 4 August 1959) is a Nigerian politician who was Governor of Delta State in Nigeria from 29 May 1999 to 29 May 2007. An ethnic Urhobo by descent, Ibori is a member of the people’s Democratic Party(PDP). He is a leader in the Niger Delta region and a national figure in Nigeria. In 2012, Ibori was sentenced to 13 years in prison for money laundering.

== Early life ==
Born to the family of late Chief Ukavbe Ibori and Mrs. Comfort Oji Ibori of Otefe in Oghara clan, Ethiope West Local Government Area of Delta State, he attended Baptist High School, Oghareki, now Oghareki Grammar School, before proceeding to the University of Benin where he obtained a Bachelor of Science degree in Economics and Statistics. Ibori moved to London, England in the 1980s where he married his wife, Theresa. He worked as a cashier at Wickes DIY store in Ruislip, Middlesex.

Returning to Nigeria, between 1994 and 1997 he served as a consultant to the Federal Government of President Sani Abacha, in the areas of public policy formulation and implementation. In 1999, he Contested for Governor of Delta State.

== Political career ==
Ibori's political career began in 1990 when he joined the National Republican Convention (NRC). In 1991, he was nominated to contest for the Federal House of Representatives seat, to represent Ethiope Federal Constituency. He lost the election to the Social Democratic Party (SDP) candidate.

When the Sani Abacha Transition Programme kicked off, he joined the Grassroots Democratic Movement (GDM). The GDM clinched a good number of local, state and federal positions, including one of the three senatorial seats in the state. The transition programme was abruptly terminated with the death of Abacha. Ibori then with the leaders of other defunct political groups in Delta State, formed the Delta National Congress (DNC).

The DNC later merged with many others of like ideas to birth the Peoples Democratic Party (PDP). It was on the platform of the PDP that he contested and won the 9 January 1999 Delta State gubernatorial election.

Proposed as governor of Delta State, under Nigerian law Ibori had to swear that he had no previous convictions. Using the false birth certificate and passport that he had used for the mortgage application in London, he passed the tests falsely, and was elected to become the governor from 1999. In 2003, he was re-elected as governor for another four-year term.

At the PDP's ruling party's pre-election convention in 2006, Ibori was present to lift up the hand of the victorious Umaru Yar'Adua. After Yar'Adua was selected as their presidential candidate, Ibori was accused of bank-rolling Yar'Adua's 2007 campaign, and promised a Vice-Presidential position in return. But after Yar'Adua died in office, Vice-President Goodluck Jonathan succeeded Yar'Adua, an avowed political opponent of Ibori.

== Corruption charges ==
=== United Kingdom charges ===
Ibori's corruption charges started with filing of petitions by his kinsmen under the auspices of Delta State Elders and Stateholders Forum influenced by the foremost Ijaw leader, Edwin Clark, OFR , CON who was also the former Minister of Information. The petition was sent to Nuhu Ribadu, the head of Nigeria's financial crimes agencies who initially failed to act on the petition which made the Forum, who, with other activists, revealed Ibori's crimes and made spirited efforts to bring Ibori and EFCC before court to compel Ibori's prosecution with the aid of their lawyer Kayode Ajulo.

In 2007, the Metropolitan Police raided the London offices of barrister Bhadresh Gohil. Hidden in a wall behind a fireplace, they found computer hard drives containing details of a myriad off-shore companies, run for Ibori by Gohil, fiduciary agent Daniel Benedict McCann, and corporate financier Lambertus De Boer. All of these men were later jailed for a total of 30 years.

As a result of these corruption allegations, the United Kingdom courts froze Ibori's assets, valued at about £17 million ($35 million), in early August 2007. His wife, Nkoyo, was arrested at Heathrow Airport in London on 1 November 2007, in connection with the probe of her husband's assets, particularly in the United Kingdom. She was released after being questioned. In an exclusive interview with CNN, Ibori denied allegations against him claiming they were politically motivated. He accused Nuhu Ribadu and the UK Courts of playing politics.

=== First set of Nigerian charges ===
On 12 December 2007, Ibori was arrested by the Economic and Financial Crimes Commission (EFCC) at the Kwara State Lodge in Asokoro, Abuja. The charges against him include theft of public funds, abuse of office, and money laundering. These corruption charges brought against Ibori by the government of former President Obasanjo are among many allegations by anticorruption czar Nuhu Ribadu against former officials of the Peoples Democratic Party PDP. Ribadu additionally alleged that Ibori attempted to bribe him to drop the charges with a cash gift of $15 million, which Ribadu immediately lodged in the Central Bank of Nigeria CBN. The cash remains in the CBN as an exhibit.

On 17 December 2009, A Federal High Court sitting in Asaba, Delta State, discharged and acquitted Ibori of all 170 charges of corruption brought against him by EFCC. The EFCC filed a notice of appeal against 17 December 2009 judgement, and began a new round of investigations on the former governor following a petition by members of the Delta State Elders, Leaders and Stakeholders Forum, which was made available to the public in March 2010.

=== Second set of Nigerian charges ===
In April 2010, about three months after the take over of government by former President Goodluck Jonathan, Ibori's case file was reopened. A new allegation that he embezzled N40 billion ($266 million) was pressed against him. Attempts to arrest him were unsuccessful. It was reported that he fled from Abuja to Lagos and then to the creeks of Oghara, his homeland in the Niger Delta. It was reported that he has been guarded by armed militias and they once had a shoot out with government security forces. He claimed that the charges were frivolous and that he was a victim of political persecution.

In April 2010, Ibori fled Nigeria, prompting the EFCC to request the assistance of Interpol. On 12 July 2010 the Governor of the CBN, Malam Sanusi Lamido revealed that Ibori had used Delta State as collateral for N40 billion loan when he was governor.

=== Arrest in Dubai, extradition to UK ===
On 13 May 2010, Ibori was arrested in Dubai, United Arab Emirates under Interpol arrest warrants, issued from United Kingdom courts and enacted by the Metropolitan Police. Ibori was granted bail pending an extradition hearing. A spokesman for the Metropolitan Police confirmed that the United Kingdom would "seek Mr Ibori's extradition".

The Nigerian government and the United Kingdom then agreed to work together on Ibori's extradition to the United Kingdom. even as his movement became restricted by the Dubai authority. Punch Newspaper however reported on 27 May 2010, that Ibori was seeking political asylum in Dubai.

Ibori's case and extradition became one of the longest, most complex and expensive operations mounted by Scotland Yard in recent years. Prosecutors alleged that companies owned by Ibori and his family were beneficiaries from the sale of state assets, including shares in a mobile telephone operator, as well as crude oil deliveries. The EFCC confirmed on Thursday 10 June 2010, that Ibori was in custody awaiting extradition to the UK.

=== Conviction of Associates ===
In London, where Ibori is being sought in the case of money laundering, the authority continued with the prosecution of his associates who were in the dock for helping Ibori to launder money.

On 1 and 2 June 2010, UK juries found James Ibori's sister, Christine Ibie-Ibori and his associate, Udoamaka Okoronkwo, guilty on counts of money laundering, in a verdict delivered at the Southwark Crown Court, London. Mr. James Ibori, via his media aide released a statement questioning the validity of the verdict which he claimed absolved the two other women, Ms Okoronkwo and Adebimpe Pogoson who were charged alongside his sister. The jury's verdict of 2 June 2010 however returned a guilty decision against Okoronkwo as well. Christine Ibie-Ibori and Udoamaka Okoronkwo were each sentenced to 5 years in prison on Monday 7 June 2010 by the UK court even as the defense counsel pleaded for mercy that the convicts were merely manipulated by James Ibori.

=== Conviction ===
On 27 February 2012, accused of stealing US$250 million from the Nigerian public purse, Ibori pleaded guilty to ten counts of money laundering and conspiracy to defraud at Southwark Crown Court, London.

Following the guilty plea entered by Ibori, the EFCC brought before an Appeal Court the 6 year old ruling of a Federal High Court in Asaba which acquitted Ibori in 2009. They EFCC sought the court to set aside the ruling of the lower court on the grounds that the presiding judge, Justice Awokulehin, erred in law while delivering his judgement. A three-man panel of justices at the Benin Division of the Court of Appeal on 15 May 2014 ruled that the ex- governor has a case to answer. With this judgment, the coast is clear for Ibori to face further trial in Nigeria upon the completion of his jail term in London.

On Tuesday, 17 April 2012, Ibori was sentenced to 13 years by Southwark Crown Court for his crimes. Among possessions confiscated were:

- A house in Hampstead, north London, for £2.2m
- A property in Shaftesbury, Dorset, for £311,000
- A £3.2m mansion in Sandton, near Johannesburg, South Africa
- A fleet of armoured Range Rovers valued at £600,000
- A £120,000 Bentley Continental GT
- A Mercedes-Benz Maybach 62 bought for €407,000 cash, that was shipped direct to his mansion in South Africa

After the sentencing hearing, Sue Patten, head of the Crown Prosecution Service central fraud group, said it would bid to confiscate the assets Ibori had acquired his riches "at the expense of some of the poorest people in the world".

== Release ==
James Ibori was released from prison in December 2016 after a court order. He served 4 years of the 13 years to which he was sentenced. Afterward, James Ibori was deported to Nigeria, where he continued to retain political influence. In 2021, a British court ordered him to pay approximately £100 million, which was to be returned to the Nigerian government.

== See also ==
- List of governors of Delta State
