= Democratic People's Party (Nigeria) =

Political party in Nigeria

The Democratic People's Party is a Nigerian political party founded in 2006 by an aggrieved faction of the All Nigeria Peoples Party. The party, which has a broad political base, supports economic deregulation, human rights; and greater funding for health care and education, among other goals.

In the 21 April 2007 presidential elections, the winner was Umaru Musa Yar'Adua of the Peoples Democratic Party (PDP) with 24,638,063 votes. Muhammadu Buhari of the All Nigeria People's Party (ANPP) won 6,605,299 votes, Atiku Abubakar of the Action Congress (AC) won 2,637,848 votes and Orji Uzor Kalu of the Progressive Peoples Alliance (PPA) won 608,803 votes. Attahiru Bafarawa of the Democratic People's Party (DPP) came last with 289,324 votes.

Jeremiah Useni, founding chairman of the party, was a former minister in the military government of General Sani Abacha. He was suspended indefinitely in December 2008 for saying the death of Ken Sara-Wiwa was a national sacrifice. He was succeeded by Biodun Ogunbiyi, who criticized Useni's poor leadership which failed to win any seats in the Senate or House of Representatives in the April 2007 elections.
