= Kingsley (given name) =

- Gender: Unisex
- Language: English

Origin
- Word/name: Old English Cyningesleah
- Meaning: "from the king's wood" "glade" or "meadow"

Kingsley is an English given name. Written in Old English as Cyningesleah, this locational name roughly means "from the king's wood, glade or meadow," and derives from the Old English words Cyning (King) and leah (woodland clearing).

== People with the given name "Kingsley" include ==
- Kingsley Abasili (born 1984), Nigerian actor
- Kingsley Abayie, Ghanaian politician
- Kingsley Agbodike (born 1999), Nigerian footballer
- Kingsley Akpososo (born 1990), Nigerian footballer
- Kingsley Amis (1922–1995), English novelist
- Kingsley Amuneke (born 1980), Nigerian footballer
- Kingsley Armstrong (born 1962), Saint Lucian football manager
- Kingsley Asiam (1921–1982), Ghanaian politician
- Kingsley Asoah-Apima (born 1950), Ghanaian politician
- Kingsley Ayogu (born 1994), Nigerian artist
- Kingsley Baird, New Zealand artist
- Kingsley Ben-Adir (born 1986), British actor
- Kingsley Benedict (1878–1951), American actor
- Kingsley Black (born 1968), Northern Ireland footballer
- Kingsley Boateng (born 1994), Ghanaian-Italian footballer
- Kingsley Bryce (born 1993), American soccer player
- Kingsley Bugarin (born 1968), Australian Paralympic swimmer
- Kingsley Cavell (born 1946), Australian chemist
- Kingsley Chinda (born 1966), Nigerian politician
- Kingsley Chioma (born 1984), Nigerian footballer
- Kingsley Coman (born 1996), French footballer
- Kingsley C. Dassanaike (1914–??), Sri Lankan academic administrator
- Kingsley Davis (1908–1997), American sociologist
- Kingsley De Silva (1932–2006), Sri Lankan obstetrician
- Kingsley Dixon (born 1954), Australian botanist
- Kingsley Dunham (1910–2001), British geologist
- Kingsley Eduwo (born 1996), Nigerian footballer
- Kingsley Eguakun (born 2001), American football player
- Kingsley Ehizibue (born 1995), German footballer
- Kingsley Ellis (born 1944), Australian rules footballer
- Kingsley Enagbare (born 2000), American football player
- Kingsley Esiso, Nigerian lawyer and politician
- Kingsley Fairbridge (1885–1924), British civil servant
- Kingsley Fernandes (born 1998), Indian footballer
- Kingsley Fletcher (born 1956), American preacher
- Kingsley Fobi (born 1998), Ghanaian footballer
- Kingsley Beatty Gibbs (1810–1859), American civil servant
- Kingsley Aboagye Gyedu (born 1969), Ghanaian politician
- Kingsley Henderson (1883–1942), Australian architect
- Kingsley Holgate (born 1946), South African explorer
- Kingsley Hunter (born 1975), Australian rules footballer
- Kingsley Ikeke (born 1973), Nigerian-American boxer
- Kingsley James (born 1992), English footballer
- Kingsley Jayasekera (1924–2004), Sri Lankan actor
- Kingsley Jonathan (born 1998), Nigerian American football player
- Kingsley Jones (disambiguation), multiple people
- Kingsley Keke (born 1996), American football player
- Kingsley Kennerley (1913–1982), English billiards player
- Kingsley Kuku (born 1970), Nigerian activist
- Kingsley Lang (born 1988), Zimbabwean rugby union footballer
- Kingsley Madu (born 1995), Nigerian footballer
- Kingsley Martin (1897–1969), British journalist
- Kingsley McGowan (born 1992), American rugby union footballer
- Kingsley Michael (born 1999), Nigerian footballer
- Kingsley Moghalu (born 1963), Nigerian politician
- Kingsley Musabula (born 1973), Zambian footballer
- Kingsley Ng, Hong Kong artist
- Kingsley Njoku (born 1986), Nigerian footballer
- Kingsley Nyarko, Ghanaian politician
- Kingsley Obiekwu (born 1974), Nigerian footballer
- Kingsley Obuh (born 1976), Nigerian bishop
- Kingsley Obumneme (born 1991), Nigerian footballer
- Kingsley Ofosu (born 1970), Ghanaian stowaway
- Kingsley Ogoro (born 1965), Nigerian film producer
- Kingsley Ogwudire (born 1972), Nigerian basketball player
- Kingsley Onuegbu (born 1986), Nigerian footballer
- Kingsley Chibueze Onyeukwu (born 1991), Nigerian footballer
- Kingsley Otuaro (born 1968), Nigerian politician and businessman
- Kingsley Owusu (born 2002), Ghanaian footballer
- Kingsley Pinda (born 1992), French basketball player
- Kingsley Kwaku Pinkrah, Ghanaian entrepreneur
- Kingsley Rajapakse (1934–1983), Sri Lankan film director
- Kingsley Rasanayagam (1941–2004), Sri Lankan politician
- Kingsley Rock (1937–2019), West Indian cricketer
- Kingsley Sambo (1936–1977), Zimbabwean painter
- Kingsley Sarfo (born 1995), Ghanaian footballer
- Kingsley Schindler (born 1993), German footballer
- Kingsley Sit (born 1949), Hong Kong politician
- Kingsley Smith (cricketer) (born 1969), New Zealand cricketer
- Kingsley Sokari (born 1995), Nigerian footballer
- Kingsley Suamataia (born 2003), American football player
- Kingsley Swampillai (born 1936), Sri Lankan bishop
- Kingsley A. Taft (1903–1970), American politician
- Kingsley Udoh (born 1990), Nigerian footballer
- Kingsley Umunegbu (born 1989), Nigerian footballer
- Kingsley Wakelin, South African politician
- Kingsley Went (born 1981), Zimbabwean cricketer
- Kingsley Whiffen (1950–2006), Welsh footballer
- Kingsley Wickramaratne, Sri Lankan politician
- Kingsley Widmer (1925–2009), American literary critic
- Kingsley Wong, Hong Kong politician
- Kingsley Wood (1881–1943), British politician
- Kingsley Yeboah (born 1996), Ghanaian footballer

== See also ==
- Kingsley (surname)
- Kinsley (given name)
