= Kingsley (surname) =

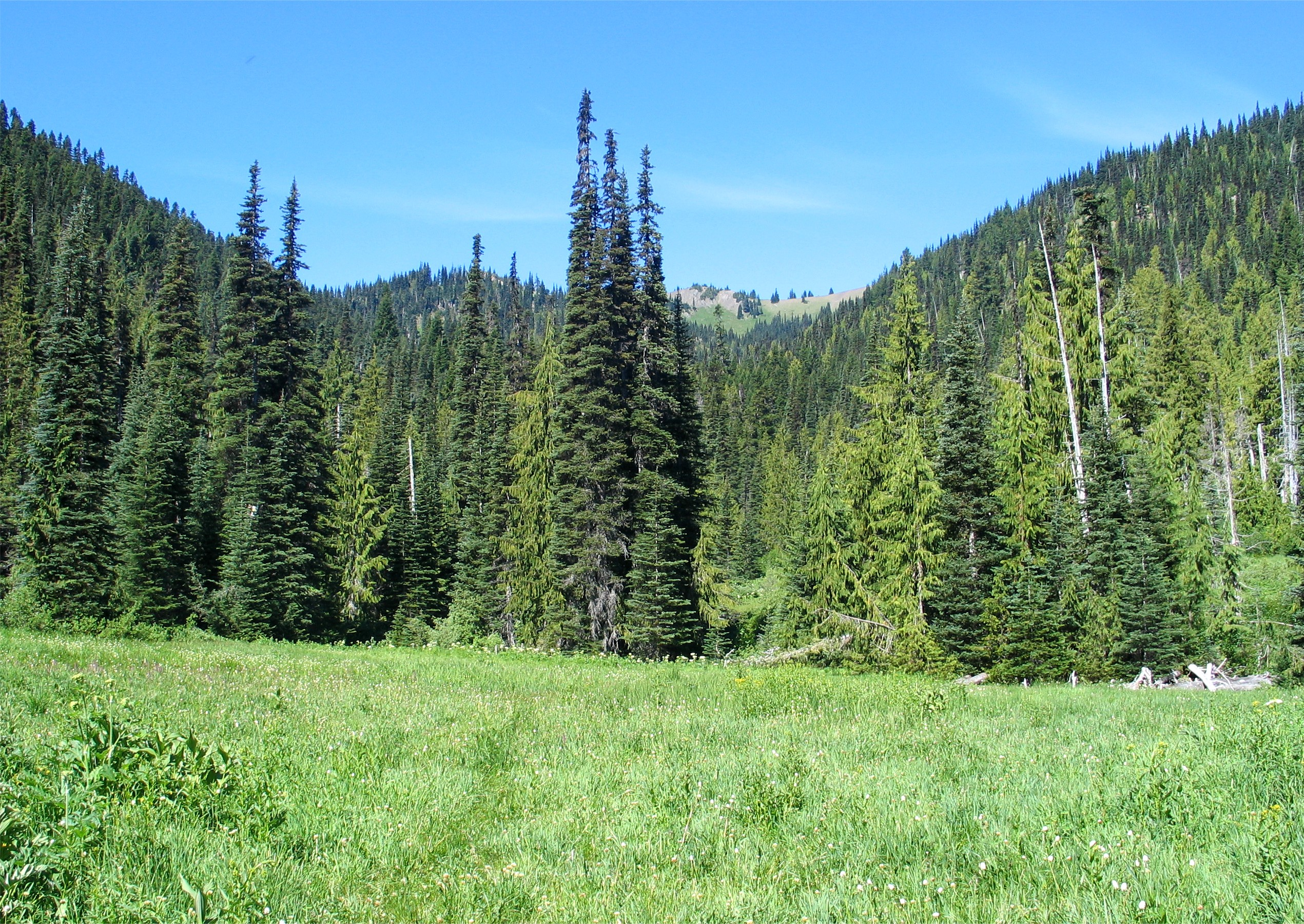
A glade (woodland clearing) in the Olympic Mountains, United States

Kingsley is an English surname. Written in Old English as Cyningesleah, this locational surname roughly means "from the king's wood, glade or meadow," and derives from the Old English words Cyning (King) and leah (woodland clearing).

== People with the surname "Kingsley" include ==
=== A ===
- Adam Kingsley (born 1975), Australian rules footballer
- Alois Kingsley (born 1969), Papua New Guinean politician
- Anna Kingsley (1793–1870), Enslaved Jolof Princess
- April Kingsley (1941–2023), American art critic and curator
- Atta Boafo Daniel Kingsley, Ghanaian politician

=== B ===
- Ben Kingsley (born 1943), English actor
- Benjamin Naka-Hasebe Kingsley, Indigenous American writer
- Bob Kingsley (1939–2019), American radio personality
- Burton L. Kingsley (1879–1944), American businessman and politician

=== C ===
- Calvin Kingsley (1812–1870), American bishop
- Charles Kingsley (1819–1875), English novelist
- Charles Kingsley (tennis) (1899–1996), English tennis player

=== D ===
- David R. Kingsley (1918–1944), American air force officer
- Dorothy Kingsley (1909–1997), American screenwriter

=== E ===
- Eleta Kingsley (born 1989), Nigerian footballer
- Elizabeth Kingsley (1871–1957), American puzzle constructor
- Emily Kingsley (born 1940), American writer
- E. T. Kingsley (1856–1929), Canadian politician
- Ezeali Kingsley (born 1993), Nigerian footballer

=== F ===
- Ferdinand Kingsley (born 1988), English actor and musician
- Florence Morse Kingsley (1859–1937), American author

=== G ===
- George Kingsley (1826–1892), English physician
- Gershon Kingsley (1922–2019), German-American composer
- Grace Kingsley (1873–1962), American columnist
- Gregory Kingsley (born 1980), American social figure

=== H ===
- Harold Kingsley (1885–1970), English soldier
- Harvey R. Kingsley (1871–1936), American politician
- Henry Kingsley (1830–1876), English novelist
- Henry Coit Kingsley (1815–1886), American lawyer

=== J ===
- James Kingsley (1797–1878), American politician
- James Luce Kingsley (1778–1852), American biblical scholar
- Jason Kingsley (disambiguation), multiple people
- Jean-Pierre Kingsley (born 1943), Canadian civil servant
- Jenna Kingsley (born 1992), Australian footballer
- John Sterling Kingsley (1854–1929), American professor

=== K ===
- Katherine Kingsley (born 1981), English actress
- Kaza Kingsley, American author
- Kent Kingsley (born 1978), Australian rules footballer

=== M ===
- Mary Kingsley (1862–1900), English writer and explorer
- Matt Kingsley (footballer) (1874–1960), English footballer
- Matt Kingsley (basketball) (born 1986), American basketball player
- Mike Kingsley (born 1959), American politician
- Moses Kingsley (born 1994), Nigerian basketball player

=== N ===
- Norman William Kingsley (1829–1913), American dentist

=== P ===
- Patrick Kingsley (1908–1999), English cricketer
- Patrick Kingsley (journalist) (born 1989), British journalist
- Peter Kingsley (born 1953), English author
- Philip Kingsley (1930–2016), British trichologist and hair-care specialist

=== R ===
- Redin Kingsley, Indian actor
- Robert Kingsley (1903–1988), American legal scholar

=== S ===
- Sidney Kingsley (1906–1995), American dramatist
- Stella Kingsley (born 2002), Nigerian weightlifter
- Stephen Kingsley (born 1994), Scottish footballer
- Stuart Kingsley (born 1948), British scientist
- Sunny Ekeh Kingsley (born 1981), Nigerian footballer
- Susan Kingsley (1946–1984), American actress

=== U ===
- Ugonna Kingsley (born 2004), Nigerian basketball player

=== W ===
- William Kingsley (??–1619), English priest
- William C. Kingsley (1833–1885), American construction contractor

=== Z ===
- Zach Kingsley (born 1980), American soccer player
- Zephaniah Kingsley (1765–1843), English slave trader
- Zephaniah Kingsley Sr. (1734–1792), British merchant and planter

== Fictional characters ==
- Hank Kingsley, a character portrayed by Jeffrey Tambor on The Larry Sanders Show
- Roderick Kingsley, a character in the comic book series Marvel Comics
- Tamara Kingsley, a character on the soap opera Home and Away
- Weak Kingsley, a character in the anime Cyberpunk: Edgerunners 2

== See also ==
- Kingsley (disambiguation), a disambiguation page for "Kingsley"
- Kingsley (given name), a page for people with the given name "Kingsley"
