= List of state parties of the Peoples Democratic Party (Nigeria) =

This is a list of official state (and FCT) party organizations of the Peoples Democratic Party.

== State organizations ==
PDP majority

State Party	Chair	Elected Executive Offices	Senate Seats	House of Representatives Seats	House of Assembly Seats	Website
National Peoples Democratic Party	Iyorchia Ayu	0 / 2	38 / 109	121 / 360	329 / 991	
Abia State Peoples Democratic Party	Alwell Asiforo Okere	2 / 2	2 / 3	5 / 8	20 / 24	N/A
Adamawa State Peoples Democratic Party	Tahir Shehu	2 / 2	1 / 3	5 / 8	13 / 25	N/A
Akwa Ibom State Peoples Democratic Party	Aniekan Akpan	2 / 2	3 / 3	9 / 10	25 / 26	
Anambra State Peoples Democratic Party	Ndubuisi Nwobu	0 / 2	2 / 3	5 / 11	5 / 30	N/A
Bauchi State Peoples Democratic Party	Hamza Akuyam	2 / 2	0 / 3	3 / 12	15 / 31	N/A
Bayelsa State Peoples Democratic Party	Solomon Agwana	2 / 2	2 / 3	3 / 5	20 / 24	N/A
Benue State Peoples Democratic Party	John Ngbede	2 / 2	3 / 3	8 / 11	24 / 30	N/A
Borno State Peoples Democratic Party	Zannah Gaddama	0 / 2	0 / 3	0 / 10	0 / 30	N/A
Cross River State Peoples Democratic Party	Venatius Ikem	0 / 2	3 / 3	4 / 8	7 / 25	N/A
Delta State Peoples Democratic Party	Kingsley Esiso	2 / 2	1 / 3	9 / 10	27 / 29	N/A
Ebonyi State Peoples Democratic Party	Silas Onu	0 / 2	3 / 3	5 / 6	5 / 24	N/A
Edo State Peoples Democratic Party	Tony Aziegbemi	2 / 2	2 / 3	5 / 9	9 / 24 (Note: As of December 2021, 14 HOA members (all APC) have not taken office due to a longstanding dispute over their swearing-ins; thus, although the APC technically have an elected majority, the practical number of APC Edo assemblypeople is 1 giving the PDP the majority.)	N/A
Ekiti State Peoples Democratic Party	Lanre Omolase (Acting)	0 / 2	1 / 3	0 / 6	0 / 26	N/A
Enugu State Peoples Democratic Party	Augustine Nnamani	2 / 2	3 / 3	8 / 8	24 / 24	N/A
Federal Capital Territory Peoples Democratic Party	Sunday Zakka	N/A (Note: The FCT does not have an elected Governor or Deputy Governor but instead two presidentially-appointed equivalents, the FCT Minister and the FCT Minister of State, who currently are not PDP members.)	1 / 1	2 / 2	N/A	N/A
Gombe State Peoples Democratic Party	Abnor Kwaskebe	0 / 2	0 / 3	1 / 6	3 / 24	N/A
Imo State Peoples Democratic Party	Charles Ugwuh	0 / 2	1 / 3	7 / 10	5 / 27	N/A
Jigawa State Peoples Democratic Party	Ibrahim Babandi	0 / 2	0 / 3	0 / 11	0 / 30	N/A
Kaduna State Peoples Democratic Party	Felix Hyat	0 / 2	1 / 3	5 / 16	10 / 31	N/A
Kano State Peoples Democratic Party	Shehu Wada Sagagi	0 / 2	0 / 3	0 / 24	1 / 40	N/A
Katsina State Peoples Democratic Party	Salisu Yusuf Majigiri	0 / 2	1 / 3	0 / 15	0 / 34	N/A
Kebbi State Peoples Democratic Party	Usman Bello Suru	0 / 2	0 / 3	1 / 8	0 / 24	N/A
Kogi State Peoples Democratic Party	Sam Uhuotu	0 / 2	0 / 3	1 / 9	0 / 25	N/A
Kwara State Peoples Democratic Party	Babatunde Mohammed	0 / 2	0 / 3	0 / 6	1 / 24	N/A
Lagos State Peoples Democratic Party	Philip Aivoji	0 / 2	0 / 3	3 / 24	0 / 40	N/A
Nasarawa State Peoples Democratic Party	Francis Orogu	0 / 2	0 / 3	1 / 5	3 / 24	N/A
Niger State Peoples Democratic Party	Tanko Beji	0 / 2	0 / 3	0 / 10	1 / 27	N/A
Ogun State Peoples Democratic Party	Sikirullahi Ogundele	0 / 2	0 / 3	2 / 9	1 / 26	N/A
Ondo State Peoples Democratic Party	Fatai Adams	0 / 2	2 / 3	2 / 9	2 / 26	N/A
Osun State Peoples Democratic Party	Bisi faction: Sunday Bisi Ojo faction: Wale Ojo (Acting)	0 / 2	1 / 3	2 / 9	3 / 26	N/A
Oyo State Peoples Democratic Party	Makinde faction: Dayo Ogungbenro Stakeholders faction: Michael Okunlade	2 / 2	0 / 3	3 / 14	26 / 32	N/A
Plateau State Peoples Democratic Party	Chris Hassan	0 / 2	1 / 3	5 / 8	8 / 24	N/A
Rivers State Peoples Democratic Party	Desmond Akawor	2 / 2	3 / 3	11 / 13	32 / 32	N/A
Sokoto State Peoples Democratic Party	Mohammed Bello Aliyu Goronyo	2 / 2	0 / 3	4 / 11	17 / 30	N/A
Taraba State Peoples Democratic Party	Kefas Agbu	2 / 2	1 / 3	1 / 6	19 / 24	N/A
Yobe State Peoples Democratic Party	Umar Mohammed El-Gash	0 / 2	0 / 3	0 / 6	0 / 24	N/A
Zamfara State Peoples Democratic Party	Bala Mande	0 / 2	0 / 3	1 / 7	1 / 24	N/A
