= Chibueze =

- Gender: Male
- Language: Igbo

Origin
- Meaning: Chi is king
- Region of origin: Igboland

Chibueze is a given name and a surname of Igbo origin that means "chi is king". Notable people with the name include:

== Given name ==
- Carney Chibueze Chukwuemeka (born 2003), Nigerian footballer
- Chibueze Christian Simon (born 2000), Nigerian footballer
- Charles Chibueze Chukwu (born 1997), Nigerian singer and songwriter
- Samuel Chibueze Chukwuka, Nigerian Anglican Bishop
- Kingsley Chibueze Onyeukwu (born 1991), Nigerian footballer
- Leonard Chibueze Duru (born 2005), Nigerian footballer

== Surname ==
- Chinonso Chibueze (born 2006), English footballer
- Collins Obinna Chibueze (born 1995), American singer and rapper
- Franco Umeh-Chibueze (born 2005), Irish footballer
