= Dragon's Eye =

Dragon's Eye may refer to:

- Dragon's Eye (symbol), an ancient geometric tetrahedron or triangle
- Dragon's Eye (TV programme), a BBC Cymru Wales television programme
- Dragonseye (or Red Star Rising), a science fiction novel by Anne McCaffrey
- Dragon's Eye: A Chinese Noir, a 2004 novel written by Andy Oakes
- The Dragon's Eye, first book in Kaza Kingsley's series Erec Rex
- Ryugan, otherwise known as the Dragon's Eye, a special ability in the anime Tenjho Tenge
- Longan, a tropical tree that produces edible fruit named "Dragon Eye" because it resembles an eyeball when shelled
- Dragon's Eye (video game), a 1981 video game published by Automated Simulations

== See also ==
- Dragon eye (disambiguation)
