= Uzor =

uzor
- Gender: Male
- Language(s): Igbo

Origin
- Word/name: Nigeria
- Meaning: door

Uzor is a surname. Notable people with the surname include:

- Edwin C.O. Uzor, Nigerian politician
- Ched Uzor, English Love Island contestant
