= Kingsley =

Kingsley may refer to:

== People ==
- Kingsley (given name)
- Kingsley (surname)

== Places ==
=== Australia ===
- Kingsley, Western Australia
- Electoral district of Kingsley, an electorate of the Western Australian Legislative Assembly

=== Canada ===
- Rural Municipality of Kingsley No. 124, Saskatchewan

=== England ===
- Kingsley, Cheshire
- Kingsley, Hampshire
- Kingsley, Northampton, a district of Northampton
- Kingsley, Staffordshire

=== United States ===
- Kingsley, Iowa
- Kingsley, Kentucky
- Kingsley, Michigan, a village
- Kingsley, Delta County, Michigan, an unincorporated community
- Kingsley, Oregon
- Kingsley, Pennsylvania
- Kingsley Corners, Wisconsin
- Kingsley Plantation, Florida
- Kingsley Township, Forest County, Pennsylvania

== Other uses ==
- Kingsley College, Melbourne, Australia, a school of theology
- Kingsley Hall, London, England
- Kingsley (mascot), the mascot for Partick Thistle F.C.
- The Kingsley Tufts Poetry Award
- Perrey and Kingsley, pioneers in electronic music
- Kingsley Royal, mascot for Reading F.C.
- Kingsley Field, airport located in Southern Oregon
- Kingsley's Adventure, video game

== See also ==
- Kinsley (disambiguation)
