= Andy Oakes =

Andy Oakes may refer to:

- Andy Oakes (footballer) (born 1977), English goalkeeper
- Andy Oakes (born 1952), English author of Dragon's Eye: A Chinese Noir
