= Kinsley =

Kinsley can refer to:

== People ==
- Kinsley (given name)
- Billy Kinsley (born 1946), musician
- Colin Kinsley, mayor of Prince George, British Columbia (1996–2008)
- Craig Kinsley (born 1989), American Olympic javelin thrower
- Jessie Catherine Kinsley (1858–1938), American folk artist
- Michael Kinsley (born 1951), political journalist
- Sarah Kinsley (born 2001), American singer-songwriter

== Places ==
- Kinsley, Kansas, United States
- Kinsley, West Yorkshire, England

== See also ==
'

- Kingsley (disambiguation)
- Kinsey (disambiguation)
