= Kingsley Ng =

Interdisciplinary artist

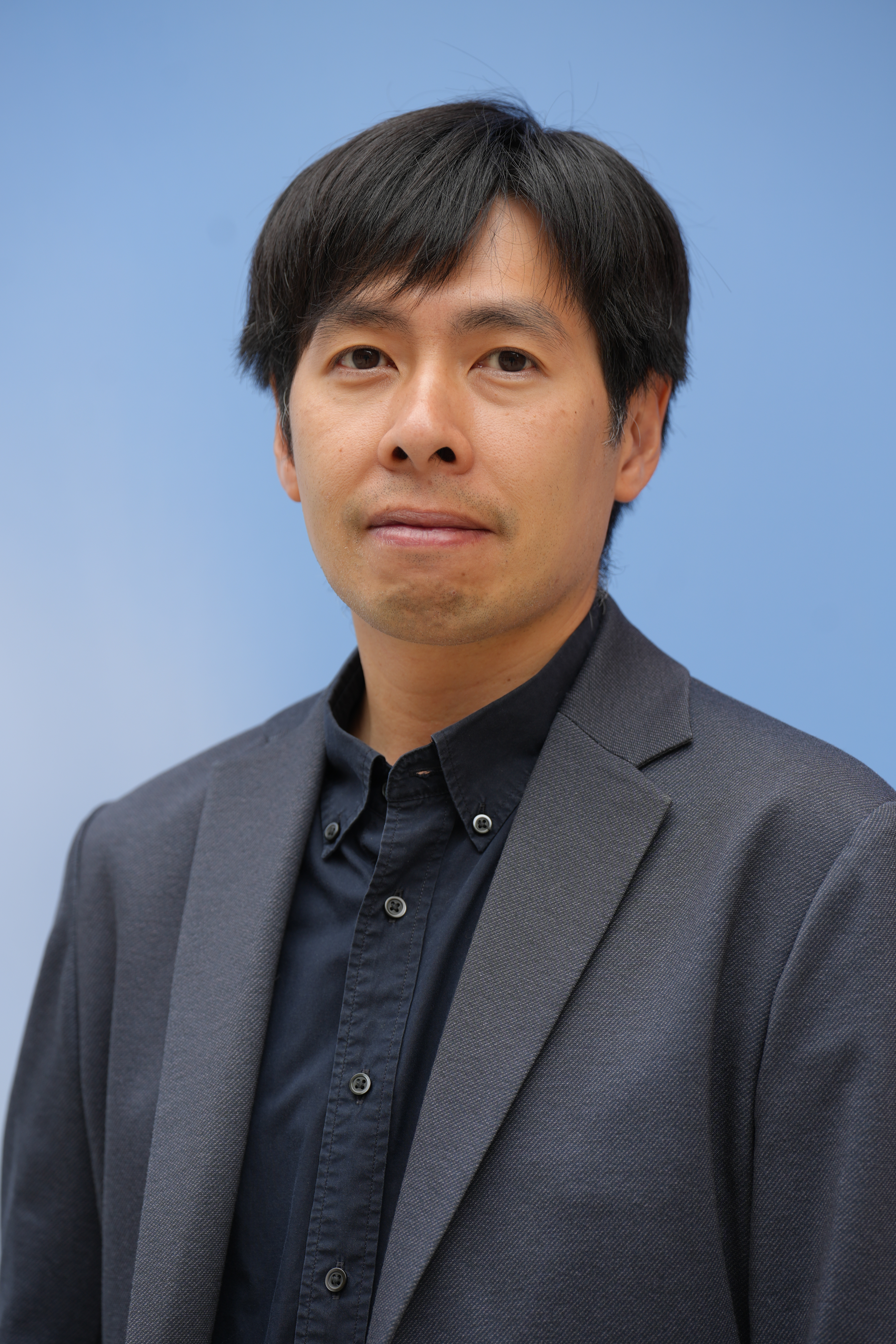
- Kingsley Ng at the 2026 Venice Biennale
- Born: 1980 (age 45–46)
- Education: Toronto Metropolitan University University of Edinburgh
- Website: http://kingsleyng.com/wp3/about/

Kingsley Ng is an interdisciplinary artist working primarily on conceptual, site-specific and community-oriented projects. His work has been presented internationally, including at the 2026 Venice Biennale, where he represented Hong Kong in the International Art Exhibition of La Biennale di Venezia. Ng crafts relationship between the work and its context through media and formats including interactive installation, public workshop, sound, spatial design and experiential design.

== Education ==
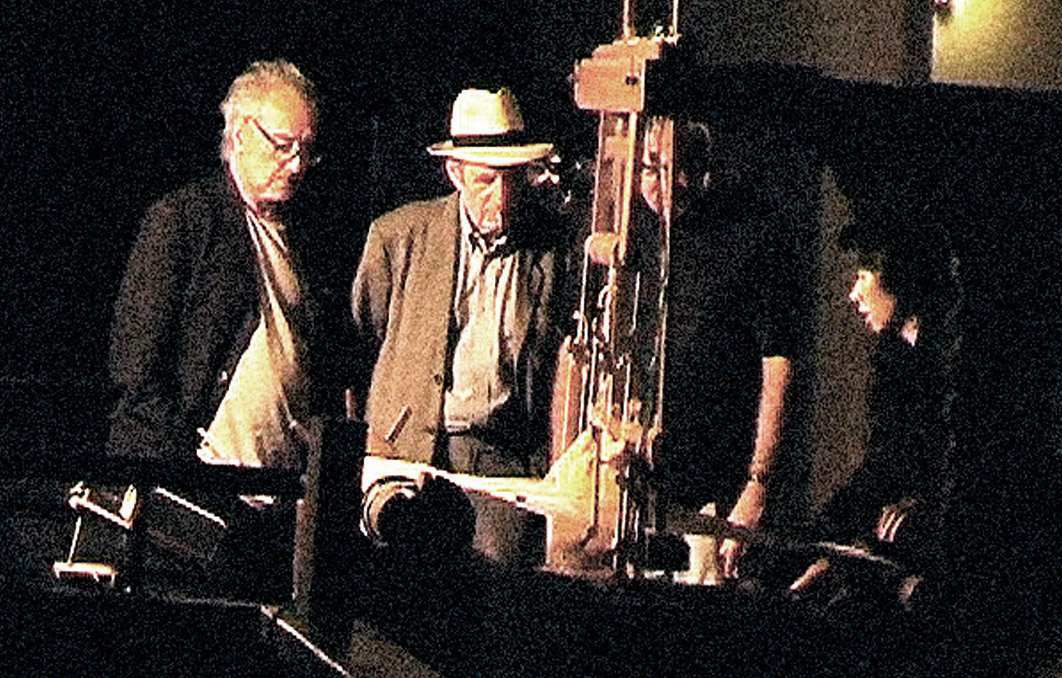
Jean-Luc Godard, André S. Labarthe, Alain Fleischer and Kingsley Ng at Le Fresnoy - National Studio.

Ng first received a BFA degree in New Media Art from the Ryerson University in Canada. He received a Master of Science in Advanced Sustainable Design from University of Edinburgh in the UK. He was accepted to a two-year training programme at Le Fresnoy – National Studio of Contemporary Arts in France, where he obtained his Post-graduate Diploma with les felicitation du jury à l'unanimité. At Le Fresnoy, he studied under the guidance of renowned artists such as Andrea Cera, Bruno Dumont, Alain Fleischer, Gary Hill, Antoni Muntadas, Atau Tanaka and Charles Sandison.

== Media art ==
In 2005, Ng made his career breakthrough with an interactive installation titled “Musical Loom”, where he transformed a 250-year-old antique weaving machine into an interactive musical instrument. Participants could weave sound and shadows by controlling a light beam, and generating mechanical sound or malleable musical expression based on their interaction. The work was conceived in the context of Northern France, where the textile industry has played an important role in the region’s economic development, recession and regeneration during the last two centuries. While the work referred to its local context, it also made reference to the loom’s role in the global history of new media art. Ng quoted art historian Lev Manovich, who cited a remark made by Ada Augusta, the first computer programmer, "the Analytical Engine weaves algebraical patterns just as the Jacquard loom weaves flowers and leaves..." Manovich continued, "The connection between the Jacquard loom and the Analytical Engine is not something historians of computers make much of, since, for them, computer image synthesis represents just one application of the modern digital computer out of thousands. But for a historian of new media it is full of significance." The work was touring in exhibitions and festivals in Europe and Asia, including IRCAM – Centre Pompidou in Paris, City Sonics Festival in Belgium, Museum of Art in Hong Kong, and Lille Europe Pavilion at the Shanghai Expo 2010.

In 2006, Ng continued to create works which responded to the value of a place. He prepared an ephemeral interactive installation titled “Homage to Tadao Ando” at the Benetton Group's Fabrica research centre in Treviso, Italy. The work is his homage to the distinguished Japanese architect Tadao Ando, who designed the Centre. Ng extracted a spiral pattern out of Ando's architectural plans and rendered it as a musical composition structure. It was in turn projected as a light pattern onto a water pond at night. Participants were invited to send candle-lit paper boats out onto the water; a musical note was generated when a boat flowed over the projected lights. As a result, the participants, jointly with nature (water, wind, fire), performed the music together.

From 2007-2008, he was commissioned by the Osage Art Foundation to create a large-scale work titled “Musical Wheel”, a rotational wheel six meters in diameter, where participants are invited to sit inside the work. On the rotational ring, there are nine pieces of curved wooden soundboards mounted with hundreds of strings; as the boards turn slowly, the strings create ambient music from all four sides the wheel. Ng was attracted to the energy of the area in which the gallery was situated, he said “The gallery is nestled in a district which tells an interesting, orchestral tune: on a daily basis, there are men repairing car wheels, people pushing trolleys, forklifts transporting goods, ventilation fans humming, printing drums turning, weaving machines looming. This collective rotational energy of the working class becomes a core essence of the work.” The artist wanted to interrogate the relationship between the gallery space and the location in which it was situated – the Osage Gallery in Kwun Tong, being the largest contemporary art space in Hong Kong, and the district, the earliest and most representative industrial quarter in Hong Kong.

For the annual citywide visual art festival in Hong Kong - October Contemporary, Ng presented an art installation titled “Record: Light from +22° 16’ 14” +114° 08’ 48” for the exhibition Site:Seeing. The work was made up of two large video projection screens, a modern version of the Gramophone, a low coffee table and sofa. The screens displayed a seemingly tranquil view of Central district in Hong Kong at night, including several landmark architectural features that characterize the area. Though it may be seen to resemble Andy Warhol’s infamous Empire (1964), this work was more closely related to its urban content than to any idea of meta-level play with viewing conventions. At the centre of the screens, Ng captured the apparently insignificant flashes of tourist photography taken at the Victoria Peak. Each flash was then marked and etched into a 12-inch disk. The disk was played on the gramophone, producing light and music. The artist wanted to investigate the contradiction between man’s ideas of “possession” and “appreciation” that revolve around the Hong Kong Harbour, an “attraction” to many for over a hundred years. A special video version was also made for the group exhibition “This is HK” curated by Alvaro Rodriguez Fominaya of Para/Site Art Space. The group exhibition was toured to cities such as Barcelona, Seoul, Hamburg, Birmingham, Taipei and Vienna.

== Site specific art ==
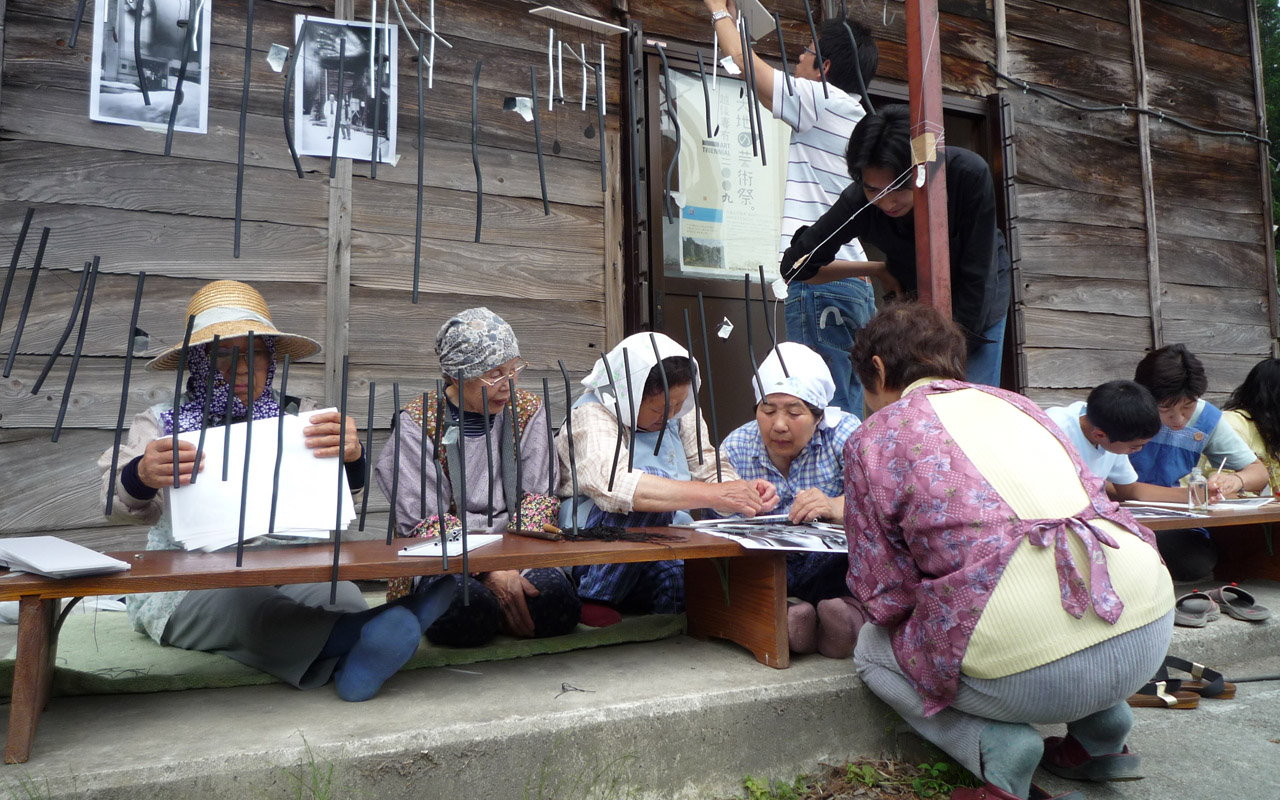
Workshop by Kingsley Ng at Echigo Tsumari Art Triennial 2010 Japan

Ng’s works are very often site-specific to its associated context. In 2009, he presented “Wind Chimes” at the Echigo-Tsumari Art Triennial in Japan, where the artist created wind chimes from metal twigs modeled after the lines on local villagers’ palms and cracks in their houses with the local community; and “Excavation” (in collaboration with Syren Johnstone and Daniel Patzold), presented at the Hong Kong & Shenzhen Bi-city Biennale of Urbanism\Architecture, where he staged an archeological dig where an imagined future of the exhibition site is seen partially unearthed. Critic and curator David Spalding called it "a brilliant site-specific intervention ... a parallel spatio-temporal experience that recasts the entire Biennale site as a ruin-in-progress."

In 2026, Ng represented Hong Kong at the 61st International Art Exhibition of La Biennale di Venezia (Venice Biennale). Presented as part of the Hong Kong Collateral Event, his exhibition explored themes of spatial perception, public interaction, and the relationship between human experience and the built environment, continuing his long-term interest in site-responsive and participatory practice.

== Works ==
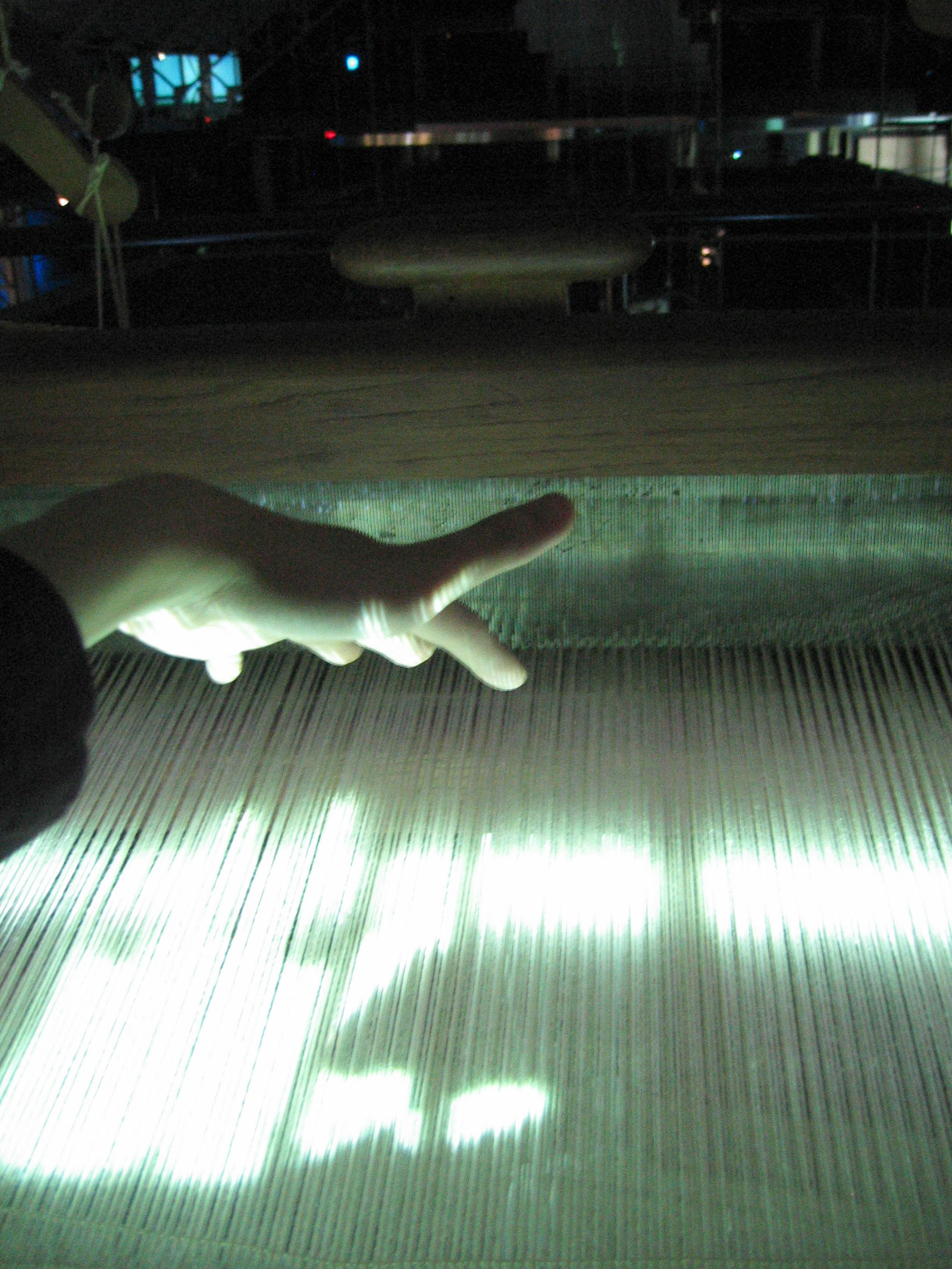
Musical Loom, Interactive Installation 2005

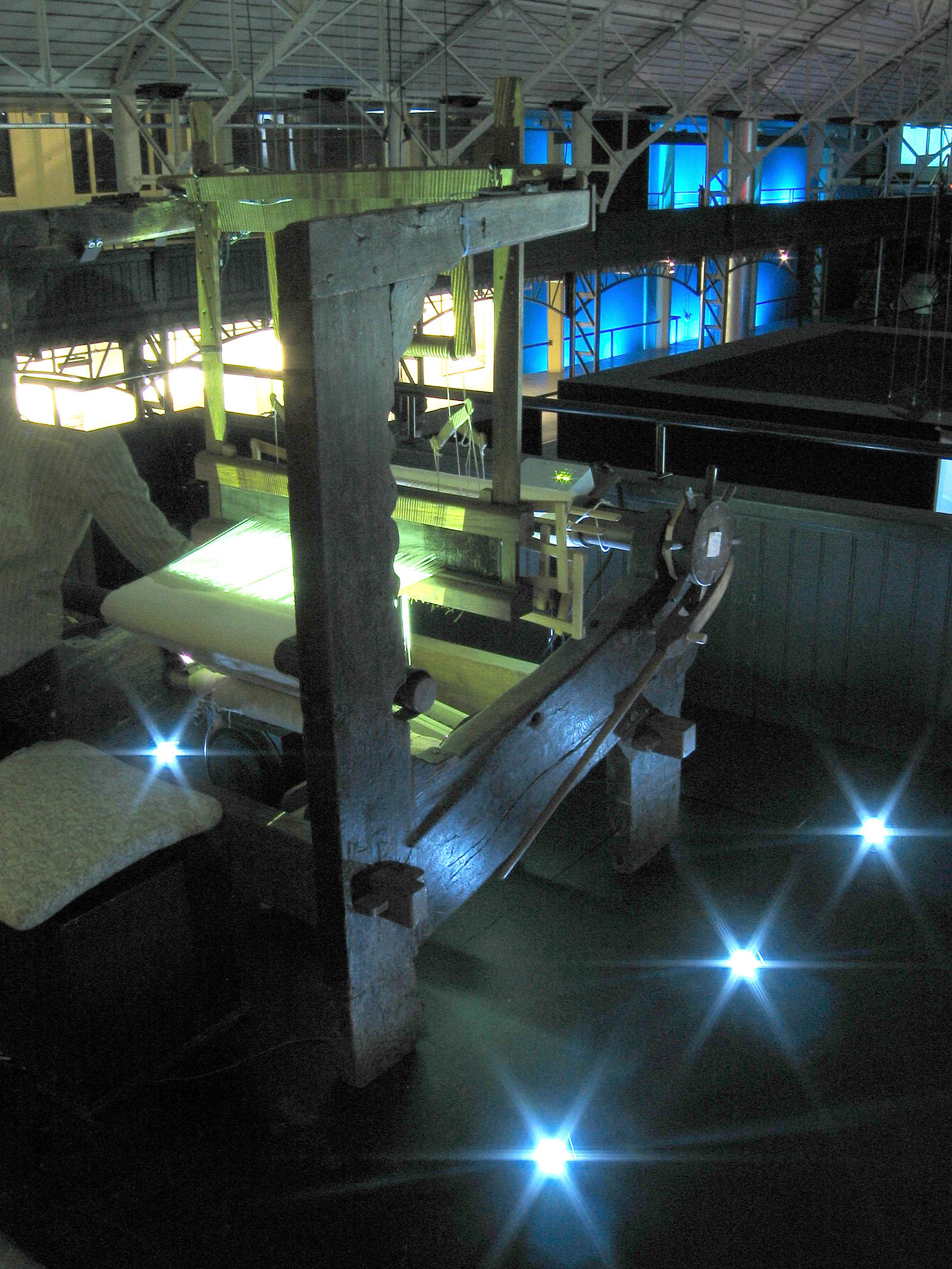
Musical Loom, Interactive Installation 2005

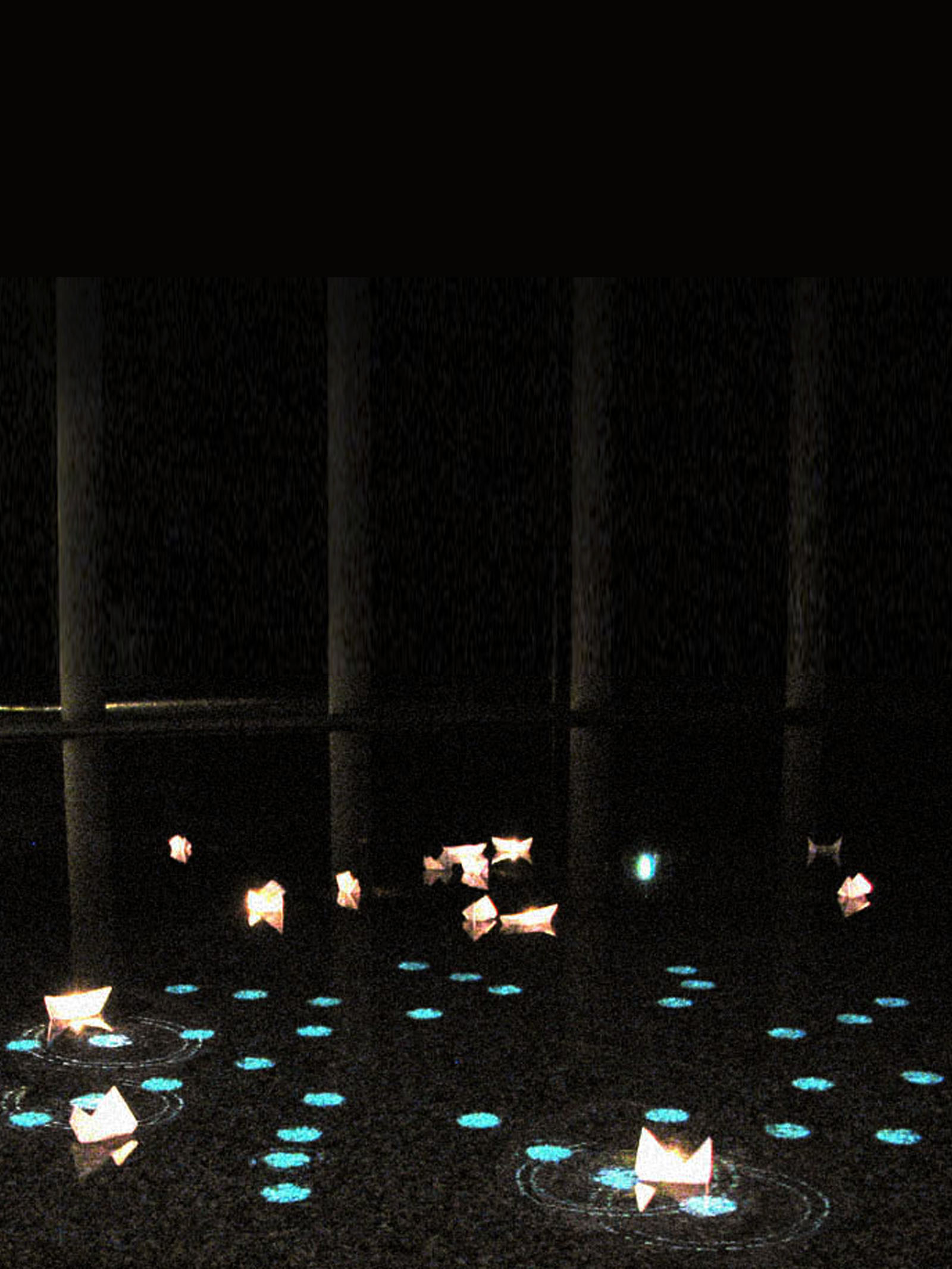
Homage to Tadao Ando, Interactive Installation 2006

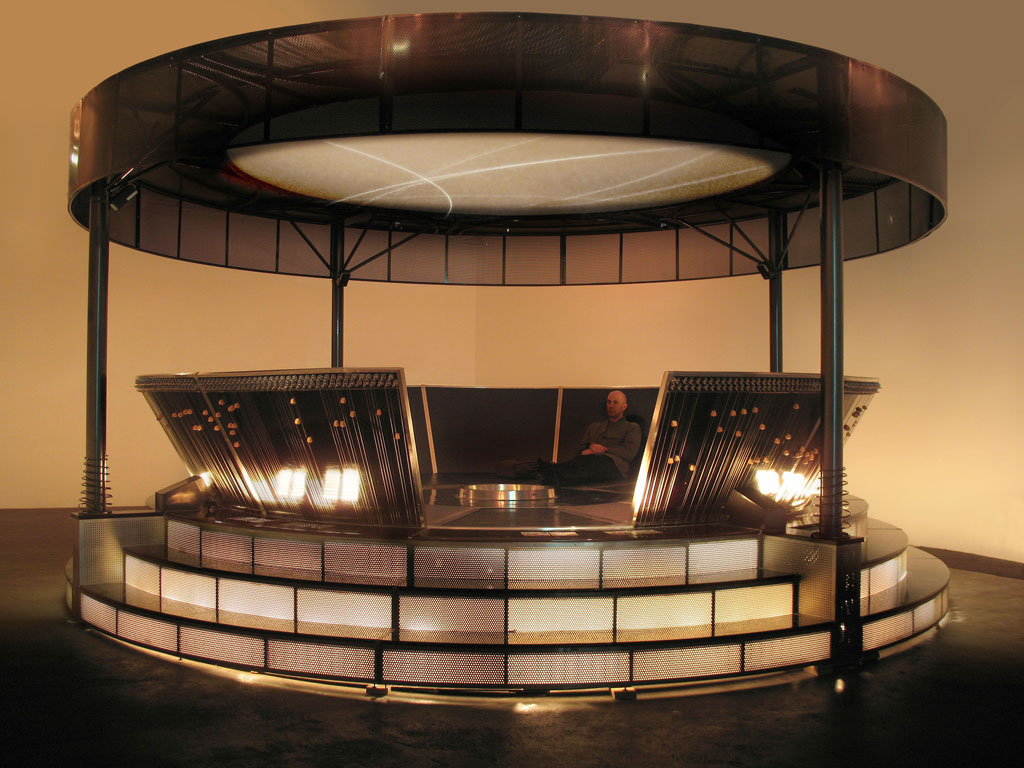
Musical Wheel, Installation 2008

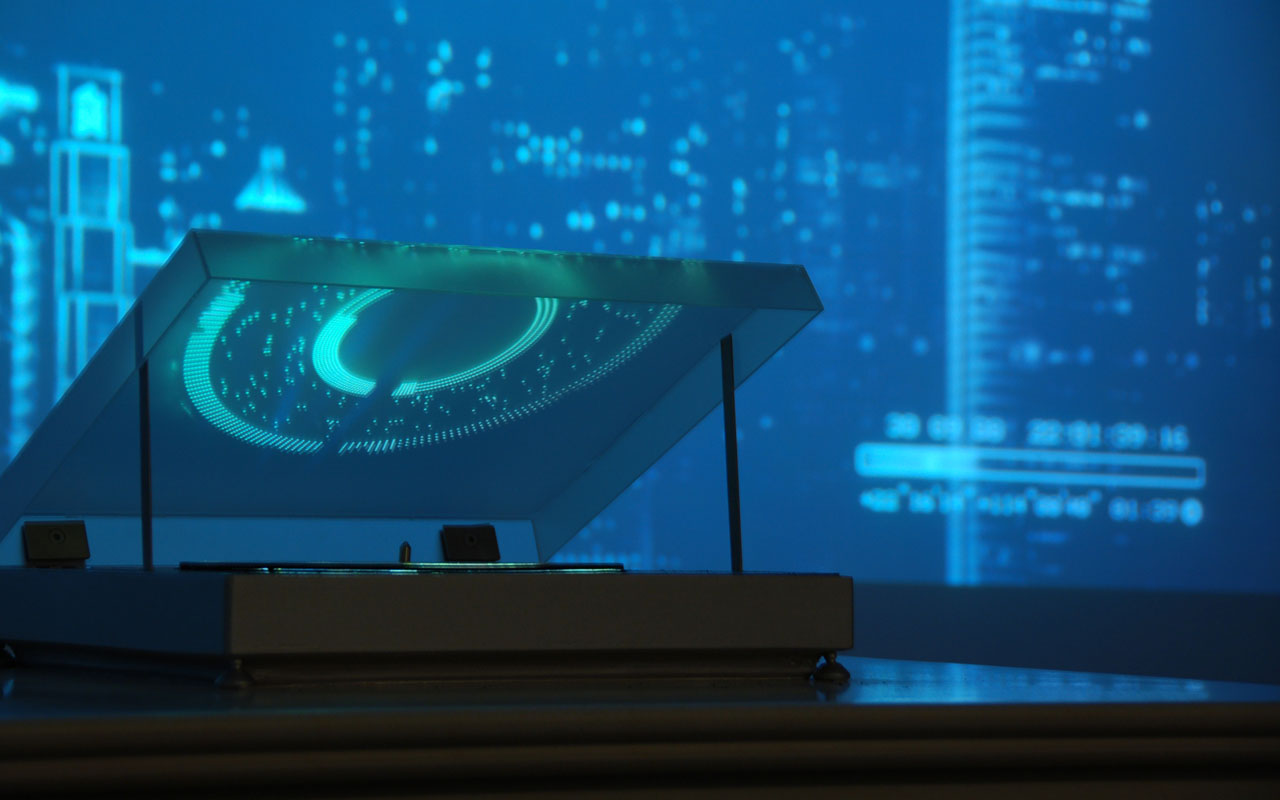
Record: Light from +22° 16’ 14” +114° 08’ 48”, Installation 2008

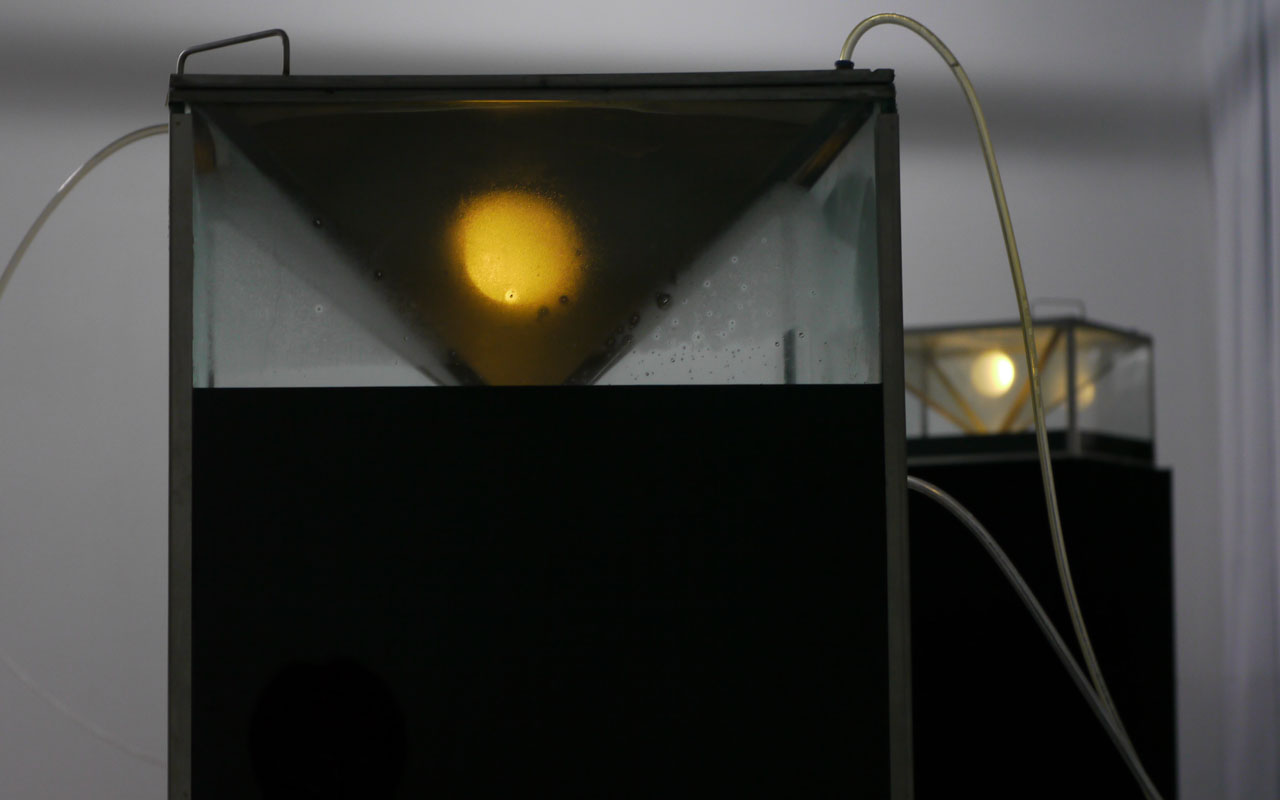
Distilling Kwun Tong, Installation 2009

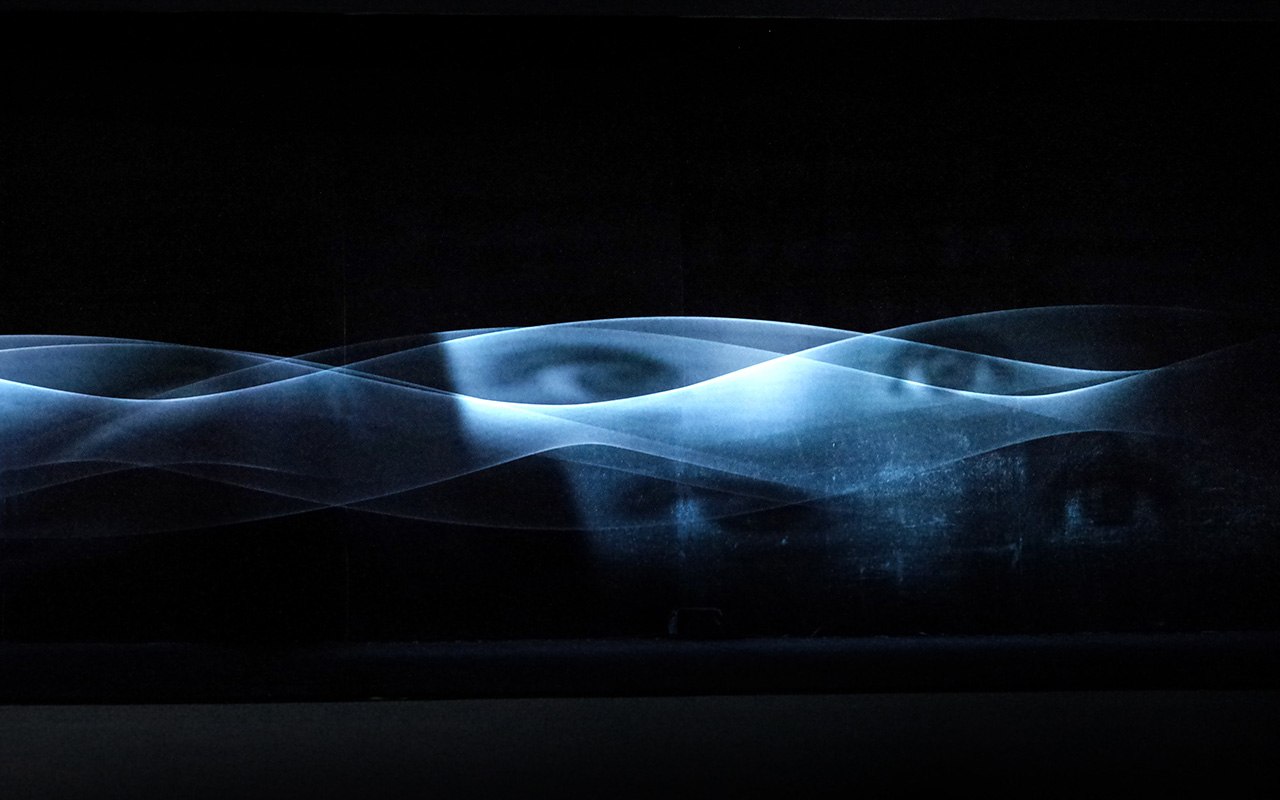
Etudes for the 21st Century, Installation 2013

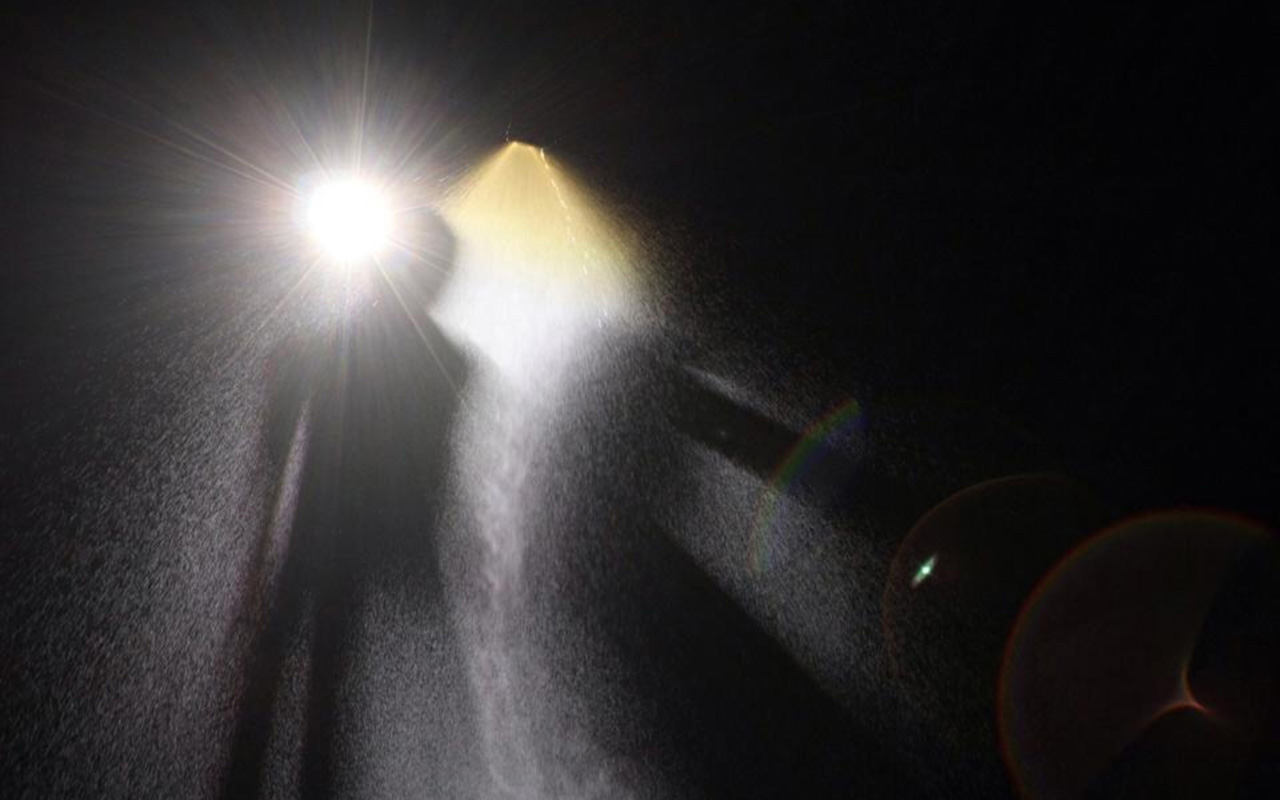
Luna Park, Installation 2014

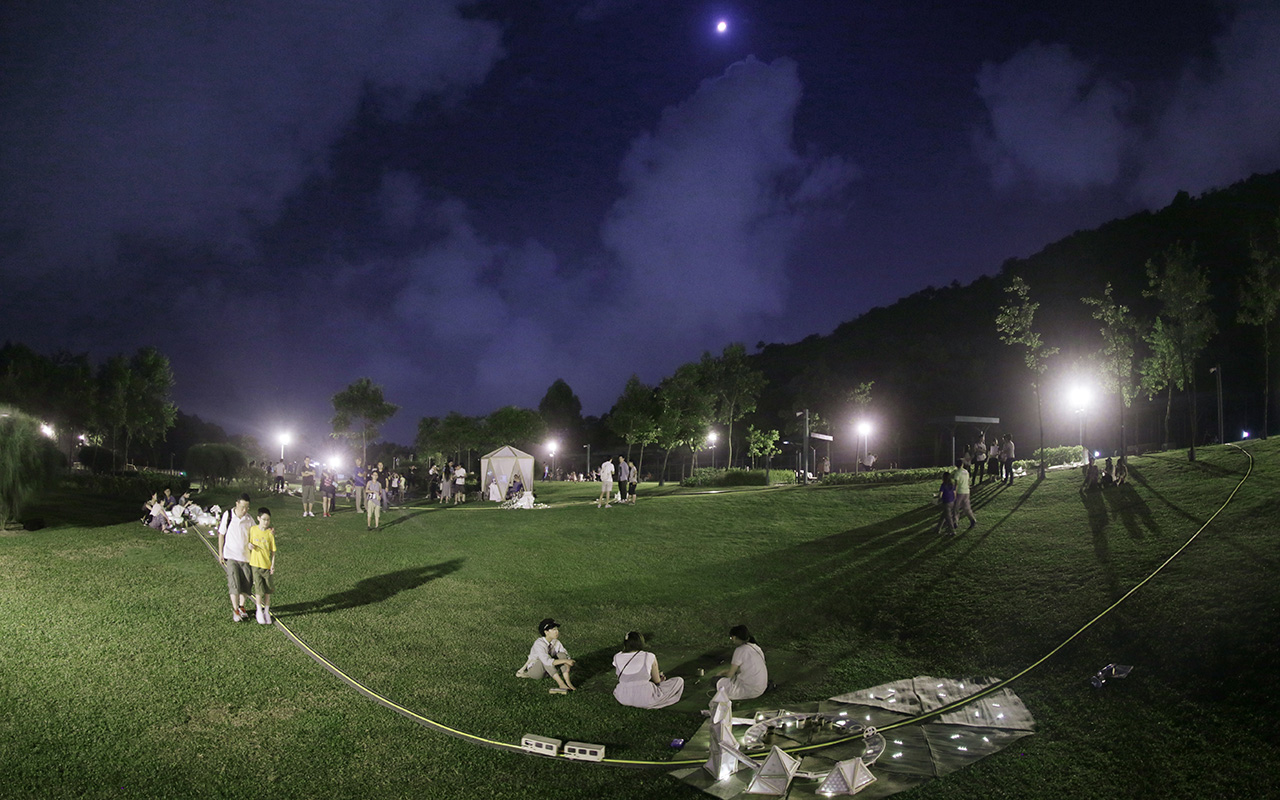
To the Moon, Installation 2014

== Prizes and awards ==
- Hong Kong Arts Development Council Best Artist Award (Media Art) 2014
- Asian Cultural Council Fellowship 2013
- Hong Kong Contemporary Art Biennial Awards 2009
- Hong Kong Young Design Talent Awards 2008
- Hong Kong Independent Short Film & Video Awards (Gold Medal, Interactive Media Category) 2007
- Canada Council for the Arts – Travel Grants to Media Artists 2006
- InterAccess Visual Arts Award 2003
