= Dragon eye =

Dragon eye may refer to:

- AeroVironment RQ-14 Dragon Eye, a reconnaissance miniature UAV in use by the U.S. Marine Corps
- Dragon Eye (manga), a 2005–08 Japanese manga by Kairi Fujiyama
- Longan, an Asian edible fruit sometimes called "dragon eye"

== See also ==
- Dragon's Eye (disambiguation)
- Dragon Eyes, a 2012 martial arts film directed by John Hyams
