= Ikeje Asogwa =

Nigerian politician

Ikeje Israel Asogwa
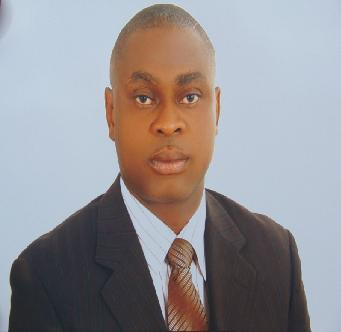
- Chief Ikeje Israel Asogwa

Chairman, People’s Democratic Party (PDP)

MD, Enugu State Housing Development Corporation

Chairman, Enugu State Universal Basic Education Board

Personal details
- Party: People's Democratic Party (PDP)

Ikeje Israel Asogwa, popularly known as SOGGIE-D, is a distinguished political administrator and a key player in Nigeria's democracy and Enugu State politics in particular. He is notable for his laudable work ethics, proactiveness, resilience, and commitment to grassroots empowerment.

Asogwa is the Director General of the “Tomorrow is Here Campaign” of Dr. Peter Mbah, who was applauded for the service driven grassroots movement at 250 wards in Enugu State.

Asogwa is known to be instrumental to PDP’s electoral success in the gubernatorial elections in Enugu State from 2015 to date. His innovative strategies for community outreach, engagement and campaigning, as well as successful transition of power from one administration to another, gained him a lot of respect and admiration from political elites, who fondly refer to him as “Game Changer”

== Background ==
Asogwa was formally an Estate manager in the private sector before Governor Sullivan Chime recruited him into the public sector to become the Managing Director of Enugu State Housing Development Cooperation (ESHDC). The former Governor commended Asogwa for being one of the most outstanding administrators in Enugu State by saying " … You have been a shining star. You have shown that your appointment was not a mistake. If given the opportunity, I will appoint you a million times over."

== Political career ==
Asogwa was formally an Estate manager in the private sector who developed various estates including the popular “Zoo Estate” in Enugu.

In 2008, he was recruited as a public official by Governor Sullivan Chime, who appointed Asogwa as the Managing Director of the Enugu State Housing Development Cooperation (ESHDC). Chime commended Asogwa for being one of the most outstanding administrators in Enugu State by saying

" … You have been a shining star. You have shown that your appointment was not a mistake. If given the opportunity, I will appoint you a million times over."

In 2015, Asogwa became the Chairman of the Enugu State People's Democratic Party following the resignation Engr. Vita Abba, who resigned his position to contest for the Enugu State Governorship Elections in 2015.

In 2019, former Governor of Enugu State, Barr. Ifeanyi Ugwuanyi appointed Asogwa as the Chairman of Enugu State Universal Basic Education Board (ENSUBEB). As Chairman of the Board, Asogwa spearheaded transformation in the State’s educational system and instituted Policies for periodic reforms to ensure access to education in the State meets requirements of Sustainable Development Goals of the United Nations.
