= Erec Rex =

Series of children's books by Kaza Kingsley

Erec Rex is a series of five books for children by American author Kaza Kingsley, the first published by Firelight Press in 2006. The first book in the Erec Rex series was chosen as a Border's Original Voices pick. The fifth book, The Secret of Ashona, was published on February 7, 2012. The sixth book was confirmed by the author on March 12, 2014, published by Simon & Schuster.

The sixth book wasn't published as planned and as of 2025, no further book of this series has been released. It's reasonable to conclude that the series has been put on indefinite hiatus.

== Books ==
- Erec Rex: The Dragon's Eye (2006)
- Erec Rex: The Monsters of Otherness (2007)
- Erec Rex: The Search For Truth (2009)
- Erec Rex: The Three Furies (2010)
- Erec Rex: The Secret of Ashona (2012)

== Synopsis ==
=== The Dragon's Eye ===
Life is not easy for twelve-year-old Erec Rex. His single adoptive mother June O'Hara works constantly, but can barely support her adopted kids. They have moved again, into an apartment so tiny that Erec sleeps with the washing machine. And worse, there is a strange force in Erec that makes him to do odd things. No matter how hard he fights it, his urge to obey grows until it is impossible to resist. Usually, it makes him do good things, like putting pillows at the bottom of stairs moments before his sister crashes down. But what if, someday, he is made to do something terrible?

Then one morning, Erec's mother is missing. His power (Cloudy Thoughts) commands him to find her, taking him on an adventure. He meets Bethany, a kindred spirit who also lost both parents in a mysterious past. Together, they discover the magical worlds of Alypium, Ashona, and Aorth, where the knowledge of magic is kept.

Things in Alypium are amiss: their King Piter is hypnotized, and his castle lies on its side. When Erec tries on his mother's glasses, he finds he can see her wherever she is. She is a prisoner of King Pluto of Aorth, one of the triplets that rule over the Kingdom of the Keepers. Erec can not understand why Pluto would want her ... but secrets start to tumble out. Erec learns he was born in Alypium, and he may not be safe there. He is upset she has hidden so much from him, and loses trust in her.

His only hope to rescue his mother is to find ingredients for a formula to blast her free. While searching for them, he enters contests to choose the next three rulers of Alypium.

The contests, including the "Pro and Contest", where they are reprimanded by movie characters, and the "Under Mine", are challenging enough, but somebody is attacking the winners, making kids afraid to compete. Erec's magical power helps him save friends from such things as swamp gas, attack fleas, and a minotaur.

Balthazar Ugry, not only evil, but with a terrible smell, seems to be the culprit. Just looking at him makes Erec tremble. What's more, Erec discovers someone is planning to take over Alypium, as well as the other magical lands—Aorth and Ashona. Could this be Ugry as well?

When the blasting formula is ready, Erec crosses King Pluto's deadly dungeons to save his mother, but he makes a mistake. He doubts her advice, and almost loses his life to the deadly destroyers and shadow demons.

Amazed he survived, he puts on the glasses to find he freed his mother. With renewed confidence in each other, they plan a strategy. If he becomes the next king, he can save Alypium from Ugry, and his family could come out of hiding.

Odds stacked against them, Erec and Bethany advance to the final contest, but something is not quite right. He must retrieve an eye from a ferocious dragon. King Pluto wants the eye, but Erec learns he must keep it. He escapes to the castle, where he is thrown into the clutches of his most deadly enemy.

=== The Monsters of Otherness ===
Ever since Erec Rex returned home, his siblings Danny and Sammy have been acting strange. They follow him, staring like lost puppies. The shock of Erec and their mother missing must have been too much for them. Erec returns to Alypium to tackle the twelve trials necessary to become king. When Danny and Sammy follow him there against his mother's wishes, Erec finds out they are impostors. The real Danny and Sammy have been kidnapped. Erec follows clues that lead him into the Green House, where President Inkle lives. He starts to believe the strange Hermit hanging around the castle might have something to do with the twin's disappearance.

Erec wonders what harrowing escapade his first trial will be, and learns he has to . . . open a nestful of dragons eggs. Not only are the eggs difficult to open, but feeding the dragon hatchlings stings his fingers. On top of searching for Danny and Sammy, Erec is attempting to learn magic from his magic tutor Mr. Peebles.

To make matters worse, the annoying Balor and Damon Stain, through a loophole in the magical law, are competing against him. Balor, Damon, and Rock Rayson are also working with Erec's enemy, Baskania, and if Erec doesn't win his quests, the future of the Kingdom of the Keepers won't look good. While Erec opens the dragon eggs, Damon Stain keeps interfering with him so Bethany and Jack try to fight him off resulting in one of the baby dragons getting hurt. After all the eggs hatch, it seems as if Balor won. After being defeated, Erec tries to feed them, hurting his fingers in the process, and the dragon mother comes back. After communicating with each other using Erec's dragon eye, the dragon mother thanks them and gives Erec a scroll, the scroll of Alithea which holds all of the answers in the universe.

Erec's next trial is to "defeat the monsters in otherness", but he is not sure how to begin. He hears that two children are being held prisoner of terrible monsters called vogum in "Otherness", the wild magical worlds outside of Alypium, and he realizes they might be Danny and Sammy. A "snail mail" love letter, written on a real snail shell from a secret admirer, turns into a correspondence that helps Erec wind his way through the perils of Otherness to find the twins.

Erec discovers the "monsters" are actually quite nice. In fact, Tina, his secret admirer, is a hydra herself. Baskania has massed an angry horde to "kill the hydras and save the children", planning to kill the hydra and valkyries for his dark purposes. Erec stands before Tina and her people, arms outstretched, pleading with the mob that the hydras are good, but Baskania twists his words. In a last attempt, Erec holds up the Scroll of Alithea. Shots ring out, and Erec waits for the sting of arrow and bullets, but then there is silence.He didn't get hit because Aosqueth, the dragon, blocks a death spell from Baskania. He then takes Aosqueths eye, giving him two eyes.

The mob has dropped its arms, but Baskania vanishes. All seems lost, but Erec, using his dragon eye, finds Baskania just as he brought back one of his ancestors from the dead. With the help of this ancestor, and now the dragon eye he will take from Erec, Baskania will rule the world.

With the help of an ancestor of his own, and using what he has learned, Erec saves the day, though in the process discovers two dangerous secrets. Baskania is madder still, and more determined to kill Erec and take his dragon eye.

=== The Search for Truth ===
In book 3 of the Erec Rex series, Erec is faced with even more daunting tasks, choices, and dangers. Baskania is somehow getting information out of his friend, Oscar Felix. He cannot trust his friend. When Erec goes to collect his quest, Baskania is there. He pulls the quest out of Al's Well, but it is torn. All it says is "get behind". Erec goes in search for the Well of Delphi so he may talk to the fates in person. He does so but the fates are not much help, and just laugh and giggle like fangirls. Oscar suddenly shows up and demands to know how his father died. The fate tell him "Rosco killed him". But they are not alone. Balor Stain shows up just as Erec asks the fates who his father is. The fates become confused and think he means who is Balor's father. Balor turns out to be a clone of Baskania.

The latest contest for Erec is to "get bee-hind and set it free". A Bee Hind is a mystical hind (deer) that attracts bees, not to mention the Substance. Erec must take this bee-hind from its home and let it roam free to spread the Substance all over the world. But the Bee-Hind is protecting a man, who had been a lackey of Baskania until he outsmarted him (he apparently did "something bad" to Ugry under Baskania's orders), and his son. If Erec removes the Bee-Hind, his new friends will be killed by a manticore. Erec eventually sets the Bee-Hind free, but instead of running away, he stays behind. He tells Bethany to go home, but she will not, even when he tries to trick her into leaving. Erec later saves the day by luring the manticore into a hole in the Substance, killing it.

Erec's next task is to retrieve the five Awen from their mystical hiding places and unite them, a herculean undertaking that has laid waste to all those who have attempted it. Erec collects the Awen with the help of his friends, but the Twyth Boar is a trickier matter. The man who owned it once upon a time was now dead. Erec goes back in time to retrieve it, and discovers something truly shocking - he is one of the royal triplets. Erec goes back to his time and confronts King Piter, his father. Piter reveals that if Erec found out, the castle would collapse, which it promptly does. Erec goes to connect the Awen to the Twyth Boar. He gains perfect knowledge of all things, but gets rid of it to help fix the Substance. But the Boar comes back to him, though the intelligence does not. Erec and Bethany later discover that Baskania has kidnapped her brother. She goes to save him, but Baskania appears and captures her and demands to know her secret. Bethany, put under a spell, tells him that the Final Magic is found in the smallest child of the first king of Alympium's greatest seer, which happened to be Bethany. Erec saves Bethany in the end, but she was shot with an old spell. She is put in a deep sleep. After a day or so, a thought strikes Erec. He kisses her and she wakes up.

=== The Three Furies ===
In the Three Furies, Erec Rex is faced with more challenges than before. His best friend, and secret crush, Bethany, has been captured by Baskania, and he could not get to her in time to save her. She had been writing him letters, but he had been so concentrated on his mixed feelings about her since he kissed her to save her in the last book, and had not answered her. Thanatos Argus Baskania is the Shadow Prince who is after the Great Secret, which will direct him to the Final Magic. Erec has cloudy thoughts that appear in times of crisis, that help him stop bad things from happening. Once before he had a cloudy thought and pretty much turned into a fire breathing dragon. His most recent cloudy though brought him to the realization that Bethany was in danger. And he was correct. She has been taken by Baskania. Erec must return to the Kingdom of the Keepers to rescue Bethany, but he won't be going alone. His family will endure this adventure with him. Erec must visit with the Fates to see if they can help him figure out a way to save Bethany. Of course, like any adventure to save a damsel in distress, the task ahead will not be an easy one. There will be only one way to save Bethany, the steps that Erec must take will be extremely challenging. These steps will guide him down his path to becoming the King of Alypium. He must go to the Nightmare Realm where no one has ever returned from. Despite the dangers, Erec continues forward with these quests, determined to rescue Bethany.

By using his mother's Seeing Glasses, he is able to contact Bethany. Her condition is not good, since she is chained to a chair with small metal cones around her head, which pull out her memories and play them on a screen so Baskania can sort through them to try to find the secret to the Final Magic. Bethany tries to persuade Erec not to rescue her, since she is being held in Baskania's most protected fortress, knowing he very well might not come out alive. Erec begins to worry, but continues to plan on helping her escape.

After plenty of ordeals and challenges along the way, Erec finally makes his way into the fortress to help Bethany, but not without being caught by Baskania first. Baskania in turn multiplies Bethany so that there are a hundred Bethanys in the room, and he continues to kill them with magic until he hits the right one. Using his own magic, Erec manages to multiply himself and Baskania into different copies. Using his dragon eyes, and a comment to the real Bethany about how he told her he loved her, Erec manages to get Bethany and his friends out of the fortress.

But that is not all. After completing his fifth quest, Erec gets his next quest, which tells him to give himself up to the three Furies. In other words, he has to give his soul to them and die, so that they can take revenge on the world. He has a hard time leaving his family, and Bethany, but he manages to sneak away to Tartarus to speak to the three Furies. Initially, he was hoping to find some way out of Tartarus alive, but after speaking with the Furies, he believes it to be impossible. The Furies do escape Tartarus into the real world, but whether or not Erec makes it out too is undisclosed unless you read the book.

=== The Secret of Ashona ===
Erec Rex has had many difficult tasks in the past but none like the task he has to face right now. Erec has lost most of his soul and has to retrieve it from the three Furies. If Erec doesn't get his soul back soon, he will turn evil. Meanwhile, his brother, Trevor, is in trouble and Erec needs to save him as well. Erec has also received his seventh task which is just as dangerous as the last. Bethany, on the other hand, is stuck at home with Erec's family and Jam. Erec is also trying to release the souls kept by the Furies free. To do this, however, he has to give himself up to his worst enemy: Baskania. This couldn't be a worse time for Erec to be facing what he is.

=== Standstill ===
While it was confirmed the sixth book was being written by author Kaza Kingsley on March 12, 2014, there is still no expected release date as of July 9, 2025. The last official statement from the author about Erec Rex was uploaded to the official website on January 24, 2015. This update stated the book was still in production, and it is unknown why the series has come to a standstill.
