= Delta State Peoples Democratic Party =

Delta state political party

- Chairman: Solomon Arenyeka
- Spokesperson: London Owofasa
- Deputy Chair: Moses Iduh
- Headquarters: Asaba City, Delta State
- National affiliation: Peoples Democratic Party
- Senate (Deltan seats): 3 / 3
- House (Deltan seats): 10 / 10

The Delta State Peoples Democratic Party (also known as Delta PDP) is the state level chapter of the Peoples Democratic Party in Delta State, Nigeria. It is the current ruling political party in the southern oil-rich state and has produced governors since the advent of the fourth republic in 1999.

The party's executive is led by Chairman Solomon Arenyeka and Deputy Chair Moses Iduh

== Current elected officials ==
=== Statewide offices ===
- Governor: Arthur Okowa Ifeanyi
- Deputy Governor: Kingsley Otuaro

=== Members of the Senate ===
Senator	District
James Manager	Delta South
Ovie Omo-Agege	Delta Central
Peter Nwaoboshi	Delta North

=== House of Representatives ===
Representative	Constituency
Joan Onyemaechi Mrakpor	Aniocha/Oshimili
Victor Nwaokolo	Ika
Leo Ogor	Isoko
Nicholas Mutu	Bomadi/Patani
Oritsewinor Kevin Olu	Warri
Dan Keynieju	Warri
Osai N. Osai	Ndokwa
Efe Afe	Okpe/Uvwie/Sapele
Solomon Ahkwinakwi	Udu/Ughelli
Julius Pondi	Burutu
Lovett Idisi	Ethiope

== List of state party chairmen ==
Chairman	Term
James Manager	1998–1999
Pius Sinebe	1999–2006
Emmanuel Ogidi	2006–2008
Peter O. Nwaoboshi	2008–2014
Edwin C.O. Uzor	2014–2016
Kingsley Esiso	2016–2024

Solomon Arenyeka 2024- present

== See also ==
- Enugu State Peoples Democratic Party
