= Enugu State Peoples Democratic Party =

Enugu State Peoples Democratic Party, also known as Enugu PDP, is the largest contemporary political party in Enugu State, Nigeria. It is affiliated with the national Peoples Democratic Party, and is led by chairman Augustine Nnamani. The party has its headquarters in Enugu, which is the state capital. As of May 2015, the party had controlled the Enugu State governorship for 16 years.

== Current leadership ==
- Chairman: Augustine Nnamani
- Secretary: Mr. Cletus Akalusi
- Organizing Secretary: Dr. Christian Iyiani
- Woman Leader: Mrs. Vera Ezugwu
- Youth leader: Hon Patty Okoh

== List of party chairmen ==
- Charles Egumgbe
- Onyioha Nwanjoku
- Vita Abba
- Ikeje Asogwa (2014—2016)
- Augustine Nnamani (2016—present)

== See also ==
- Delta State Peoples Democratic Party
