= Anglican Diocese of Isuikwuato =

Anglican diocese in Nigeria

Coordinates: 5°32′N 7°29′E

The Anglican Diocese of Isuikwuato is one of nine dioceses within the Anglican Province of Aba, itself one of 14 ecclesiastical provinces within the Church of Nigeria. The current bishop is the Right Rev. Manasses Chijiokem Okere

The pioneer Bishop of Isuikwuato was Samuel Chibueze Chukwuka, installed on 13 March 2005. On his retirement in 2013, Manasses Chijiokem Okere became the second bishop.
