= Kinsley (given name) =

- Gender: unisex

Origin
- Origin: English
- Meaning: “king’s meadow”

Kinsley is a given name of English origin that is a transferred use of an English place name and surname.

The name has increased in popularity in English speaking countries such as the United States, where it first ranked among the top 1,000 names for newborn girls in 2005 and has ranked among the top 100 names for newborn girls since 2016. Spelling variants of the name are also well used. It is a name that is notably more commonly used by whites in rural states of the United States than in more urban areas.

Notable people with the name include:

- Kinsley S. Bingham (1808–1861), American politician

== See also ==
- Kingsley (given name)
