= Jason Kingsley =

Jason Kingsley may refer to:

- Jason Kingsley (actor) (born 1974), American actor
- Jason Kingsley (businessman) (born 1964), British businessman
