= Benjamin Naka-Hasebe Kingsley =

American writer

Benjamin Naka-Hasebe Kingsley is an Indigenous American writer and poet. Benjamin belongs to the Onondaga Nation. He is most recognized for his collections: Colonize Me (Saturnalia, 2019) and Not Your Mama’s Melting Pot (Backwaters Press, 2018). He has also released another collection, Dēmos: An American Multitude (Milkweed Editions, 2021).

== Education ==
Kingsley got his Masters of Fine Arts (MFA) from the University of Pennsylvania.

== Colonize Me ==
Colonize Me is Kingsley's second poetry collection. The poems in the collection are often based on his real experiences. The collection won an Eric Hoffer Award.

== Dēmos: An American Multitude ==
Dēmos: An American Multitude was released on March 7, 2021. The collection features poems relating to Onondaga, Japanese, Cuban and Appalachian cultures.

== Career ==
From 2019 until at least October 21, 2020, Kingsley worked as an Assistant Professor of English in the College of Arts and Letters at Old Dominion University.

He currently works as an associate professor at Cedarville University.

== Personal life ==
Kingsley grew up in the affluent suburbs of Mechanicsburg, Pennsylvania. His mother has worked as an account director at IBM for thirty years and his father held various positions of leadership at different organizations.

In August 2017, during the time which he was writing Dēmos, Kingsley was assaulted by a police officer in Harrisburg, Pennsylvania. According to Kingsley, he was maced by a police officer without reason on the street at night. He then stumbled into oncoming traffic, before going to a local pizza shop, where patrons helped clear his eyes with water. He was comforted by the presence of his friend.

== Awards ==
- 2020 Winner of the Library of Virginia Literary Award
- 2019 Howard Frank Mosher Short Fiction Prize
- Fellowship from Fine Arts Work Center in Provincetown
- 2017 VONA/Voices of Our Nation
- 2017–2019 Gilman School Tickner Writing Fellow
