= Kingsley Akpososo =

Nigerian footballer

Personal information
- Full name: Kingsley Akpososo
- Date of birth: 12 June 1990 (age 36)
- Place of birth: Brass, Nigeria
- Height: 1.67 m (5 ft 5 1/2 in)
- Position: Midfielder

Team information
- Current team: Niger Tornadoes
- Number: 17

Youth career
- Ocean Boys F.C.

Senior career*
Years	Team	Apps	(Gls)
2008–2009	Ocean Boys F.C.		
2009–	Niger Tornadoes		
- * Club domestic league appearances and goals

Kingsley Akpososo (born 12 June 1990 in Brass) is a Nigerian footballer who currently plays for Niger Tornadoes.

== Career ==
Akpososo began his career with Ocean Boys F.C., which won the cup in the 2008/2009 season. On 5 September 2009, he signed for league rivals Niger Tornadoes

== Honours ==
- 2008: FA Cup Winner
