= Kingsley Holgate =

South African explorer

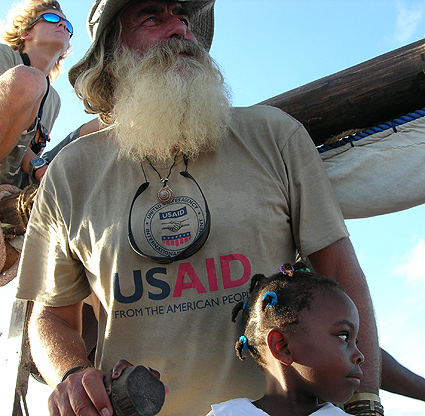
Kingsley Holgate

Kingsley Holgate (born 28 February 1946 in Natal) is a South African explorer, humanitarian and author. A fellow of the Royal Geographical Society, he has been described by Getaway Magazine as "the most travelled man in Africa" and has modelled himself on David Livingstone. Holgate has also written several books about his expeditions and fronted several National Geographic documentaries.

He also worked on the TV series Shaka Zulu.

== Expeditions ==
Holgate's expeditions are rarely completed on his own, notably they usually involve him travelling with other members of his family including his partner Sheelagh and son Ross.

- 'Boundless Southern Africa': A first of its kind journey to link and unite Nature, Culture and Community through nine Countries, seven Transfrontier Conservation Areas, more than thirty National Parks and Nature Reserves and most importantly the Communities living within or adjacent to these areas.
- 'Afrika Odyssey': A crossing of Africa from Cape Town to Cairo following the lakes and rivers of the continent in open boats.
- Circumnavigation of Lake Turkana.
- First circumnavigation of the Makgadikgadi Salt Pans in Botswana.
- 'Extreme Latitude': Circumnavigation of the globe using various methods of transport following the Tropic of Capricorn.
- 'Livingstone's Last Journey': Following the route of Livingstone's two black porters, Chuma and Susi who carried his body from Lake Bangwelu in Northern Zambia to Bagamoyo near Zanzibar.
- 'Lake of Stars Expedition': following Dr David Livingstone's 1862 expedition up the Ruvuma river, separating Mozambique and Tanzania to Lake Malawi or the 'Lake of Stars'.
- Circumnavigation of Lake Victoria in an open boat following in the footsteps of H.M. Stanley and his boat the 'Lady Alice'.
- 'Rufiji Expedition': Tracking the Rufiji river in tribute to explorer Captain Frederick Courtenay Selous.
- 'African Rainbow Expedition': Travelling from Durban in South Africa to the Somali border and back using Land Rovers and a 35tonne sailing dhow this humanitarian mission distributed tens of thousands of mosquito nets to pregnant mothers and infants in an enormous malaria awareness drive.
- 'The Outside Edge Expedition': Another humanitarian campaign crossing 33 countries promoting malaria awareness as well as the 'Right to Sight' and 'Teaching on the Edge' programmes.

== Humanitarian Work ==
Holgate has founded the 'Kingsley Holgate Foundation' which aims to "save and improve lives through adventure" through "humanitarian expeditions that make a difference". This has been the focus of his more recent expeditions such as the 'Africa Rainbow Expedition' and 'The Outside Edge Expedition'. This aim has been implemented through programmes such as the 'One Net, One Life' campaign which aims to give out thousands of mosquito nets to help prevent malaria simply and cheaply. The 'Right to Sight' campaign provides glasses to assist the hard of sight, allowing them to resume simple tasks such as sewing, reading and beadwork to help them contribute to their community. The third campaign 'Teaching on the Edge', a scheme supported by Centurus Colleges and Rotary International, aims to provide teaching resources and mobile libraries to remote communities to provide education and improve literacy.

== Books by Kingsley Holgate ==
- Cape to Cairo: A Family Expedition Along the Waterways of Africa
- Africa: In the Footsteps of the Great Explorers
- Capricorn: Following the Invisible Line
- Afrika: Dispatches from the Outside Edge
