= Kingsley Ayogu =

Nigerian artist (born 1994)

Ayogu Kingsley
- Born: Ayogu Ifeanyichukwu Kingsley; 23 September 1994 (age 31); Enugu
- Occupations: Hyper-realist, artist
- Known for: Hyper-realism

Ayogu Kingsley Ifeanyichukwu // (born 23 September 1994) is a Nigerian artist known for his hyperrealist style.

== Early life and career ==
Ayogu was born on 23 September 1994. He hails from Aji Igboeze North L.G.A. Enugu State, Nigeria.

In an interview with BBC Igbo, he said he started painting as a child before developing his style of hyperrealism.

In 2021, Ayogu did a painting of Malcolm X the first of his series Icons in the White House which went viral on the internet. This series was displayed in the exhibition "Just My Imagination (Running Away With Me)" at Hangar in Lisbon.

== Style of art ==
A reviewer described Ayogu's work as having "stunning, lens-like detail" depicting "situations with a wide spectrum of displayed emotion through tears, despair and affinity. The viewer of his pieces is compelled to feel connected to the paintings."

In an interview with BBC Igbo, he described his major challenge as having to import his tools. In an article on Guardian Newspaper his art was described as "terrifyingly visceral, so lifelike you feel you could touch them".

== Reviews ==
Ayogu's paintings which seek to express themes of daily experience of human life and nature have been defined as poetry that speaks to create pulsating appeal to the conscience of people.

== Awards ==
- Winner Best Experiment Artist at LIMCAF 2016
- Winner Future Awards Africa 2020 category (Arts)
