= Kingsley Esiso =

Nigerian lawyer and politician

Chairman of the Delta State People's Democratic Party
- Incumbent
- Assumed office May 2016
- Preceded by: Edwin C.O. Uzor

Personal details
- Born: Okpara inland, Ethiope East, Delta State, Nigeria
- Party: PDP
- Profession: Lawyer; politician; businessman

Chief Kingsley Esiso is a Nigerian lawyer and politician from Delta state. He was Special Adviser to Governor Ifeanyi Okowa on Library Affairs. In May 2016, he was elected and currently serves as Chair of the Delta State Peoples Democratic Party.

== Biography ==
Esiso was born in Okpara Inland in Ethiope East local government area of Delta State. He holds the title of the Oruese of Agbon Kingdom. His wife, Mrs. Esiso was conferred the Ughana of Agbon Kingdom by His Royal Majesty, Ukori 1st (JP), the Ovie of Agbon Kingdom.

Despite being accused of unsurping in April 2016, in May of the same year he received whole support of the party as one of their candidates for Ward 2 in Sapele Local Government Area elections.

Despite the opposition to his second term bid as the Delta State Chairman of the PDP, he was re-elected in August 2020.
