= Chibueze Christian Simon =

Nigerian association football player

Personal information
- Date of birth: 9 April 2000 (age 26)
- Height: 1.88 m (6 ft 2 in)
- Position: Forward

Team information
- Current team: FC Bombonera
- Number: 25

Youth career
- Thunder Balogun
- Bariga Professional FC

Senior career*
Years	Team	Apps	(Gls)
2021–2022	Fukushima United	2	(0)
2023–2025	Osaka City FC		
2025–	FC Bombonera		
- * Club domestic league appearances and goals as of 14:48, 11 October 2021 (UTC)

Chibueze Christian Simon (born 9 April 2000) is a Nigerian footballer who currently plays as a forward for FC Bombonera.

== Career statistics ==
=== Club ===
As of 11 October 2021.

Club	Season	League			National Cup		League Cup		Other		Total	
Club	Season	Division	Apps	Goals	Apps	Goals	Apps	Goals	Apps	Goals	Apps	Goals
Fukushima United	2021	J3 League	1	0	0	0	–		0	0	1	0
Career total			1	0	0	0	0	0	0	0	1	0
