= Robert Kingsley =

American lawyer

Robert Kingsley (1903–1988) was an American legal scholar and California judge. He graduated from the University of Minnesota, the University of Minnesota Law School, and Harvard Law School. A strong opponent of the Death penalty, Kingsley served as Dean of Law at the University of Southern California from 1952 to 1963, when he was appointed to the California Court of Appeals by Governor Pat Brown. The Robert Kingsley Professorship in law at USC, currently held by Susan Estrich, is named in his honor. In 1979 he was named Roger J. Traynor Memorial Appellate Justice of the Year.

== Personal life ==
Kingsley resided in California and was married.
