= Edwin C.O. Uzor =

Nigerian politician

Edwin Chukwunwike Uzor is a billionaire who hails from Delta State. As of September 2015, he is the chairman of the People's Democratic Party (PDP) in Delta State.
