= Atta Boafo Daniel Kingsley =

Ghanaian politician

Atta Boafo Daniel Kingsley is a Ghanaian politician and member of the Seventh Parliament of the Fourth Republic of Ghana representing Fomena constituency in the Ashanti Region of Ghana under the flag of New Patriotic Party.

== Career ==
He was a Transport Analyst at the Kumasi Metropolitan Assembly. He was elected in January 2017 after defeating his opposition party leading with 67.756% of the total vote cast.
