= Kingsley Kwaku Pinkrah =

Ghanaian social entrepreneur

Kingsley Kwaku Pinkrah is a Ghanaian social entrepreneur and business advisor. He founded Cedi Ghana, an NGO that addresses poverty and youth unemployment in Ghana.

== Education ==
Kingsley completed T. I. Ahmadiyya Senior High School in 2009 before graduating from Kwame Nkrumah University of Science and Technology with a Master of Business Administration in Finance.

== Career ==
He is the founder and CEO for Community and Entrepreneurial Development Initiative (Cedi Ghana), an NGO that addresses poverty and youth unemployment in Ghana.

Kingsley provides free entrepreneurship training and mentorship and has served as an advisory mentor for President Clinton’s Global Initiative University, Queens Young Leaders Program and Young African Leaders Initiative and Tonu Elumelu Entrepreneurship Program.

Kingsley has currently secured a partnership with Dunin-Deshpande Queen's Innovation Centre (DDQIC) at Queen's University, Canada and JACCD Design Institute Africa to address poverty and youth unemployment in Ghana. He was awarded a grant from BUSAC Fund in 2017 to fight poverty and unemployment in Ghana.

== Awards ==
- Social Entrepreneur of the Year, 2017 Africa Youth Awards
- The Future Awards Africa Prize for Community Action
- Most Influential and Outstanding Social Entrepreneur of the Year, 40 Under 40 Awards
- Best Community Development Initiative - Ghana (Cedi Ghana), 2016 Middle East and Africa Business Award
- 30 Under 30 Award, Young Professional Role Model Award
