= Kaza Kingsley =

American writer

- Born: Cleveland, Ohio, United States
- Occupation: Novelist

Website
- www.erecrex.com

Kaza Kingsley is an author most known for the children's fantasy series Erec Rex. She was born in Cleveland, Ohio and currently resides in Cincinnati, Ohio. Kingsley is a physician by training.

== Erec Rex series ==
Kingsley self-published the first two titles then was signed up for a proposed eight title series by Simon & Schuster in 2008.

- Erec Rex: The Dragon's Eye (2006) - "... this light but not insubstantial outing definitely belongs aboard the Potter wagon, but merits a seat toward the front."
- Erec Rex: The Monsters of Otherness (2007) - "Though Kingsley crafts a distractingly choppy, episodic plot with some familiar elements, it’s buoyed up by unusually clever details..."
- Erec Rex: The Search For Truth (2009) - "Kingsley compensates for a tendency to trot in omniscient helpers by keeping her tongue firmly in cheek ... her tale continues to tumble along briskly and will please fans of the less earnest fantasists."
- Erec Rex : The Three Furies (2010)
- Erec Rex: the Secret of Ashona (2012)
