= Patrick Kingsley =

English cricketer (1908–1999)

Personal information
- Full name: Patrick Graham Toler Kingsley
- Born: 26 May 1908; Calcutta, Bengal, India
- Died: 24 August 1999 (aged 91); Yeovil, Somerset, England
- Batting: Right-handed

Domestic team information
- Years: Team
- 1928–1930: Oxford University
- 1931: Marylebone Cricket Club
- 1931: Minor Counties

Career statistics
Competition	First-class
Matches	47
Runs scored	2270
Batting average	29.86
100s/50s	2/11
Top score	176
Balls bowled	286
Wickets	4
Bowling average	54.50
5 wickets in innings	–
10 wickets in match	–
Best bowling	2/46
Catches/stumpings	41/–
- Source: cricinfo, 12 April 2012

Sir Patrick Graham Toler Kingsley KCVO (12 May 1908 – 24 August 1999) served the Duchy of Cornwall for more than 40 years.

Kingsley was born in Calcutta, Bengal, and educated at Winchester College where he played cricket for the school and was the only Wykehamist to have played five times in the annual match against Eton. He then went up to New College, Oxford, where he played cricket for Oxford University Cricket Club for three seasons from 1928 to 1930 (captain in 1930), and then intermittently for amateur sides such as the Free Foresters.

Kingsley was a right-handed batsman. He played Minor Counties cricket for Dorset in 1927 and thereafter to 1948 for Hertfordshire.

In 1930 Kingsley became assistant to Sir Clive Burn, Secretary and Keeper of the Records of the Duchy of Cornwall; he succeeded Burn in that post in 1954 and served until 1972.

He had been an army cadet at Winchester and subsequently joined the Territorial Army; during World War II he served in the Queen’s Royal Regiment in Belgium and Germany.

Kingsley was appointed CVO in the New Year Honours of 1950 and knighted KCVO in 1962.
