= Kingsley Jones =

Kingsley Jones may refer to:

- Kingsley Jones (rugby union, born 1935) (1935–2003)
- Kingsley Jones (rugby union, born 1969) (born 1969)
