= Dragon's Eye (symbol) =

Ancient geometric triangle

Dragon's Eye

The Dragon's Eye is an isosceles or equilateral triangle pointing downward, with a "Y" in the middle connecting the three points of the triangle together. According to Rudolf Koch, the Dragon's Eye is an ancient Germanic symbol. According to Carl G. Liungman's Dictionary of Symbols, it combines the triangle meaning "threat" and the "Y" meaning a choice between good and evil.

The dragon's eye resembles a two dimensional projection of a tetrahedron viewed from directly above one of its vertices. Such a 2-D representation has been part of the logo of the Citgo Petroleum Company ever since 1965, when it was spun off from Cities Services Company.

The shape has been incorporated in the logo for the video game Ingress since its original public release in 2013. According to the in-universe mythology, the triangle represents humanity, while the hexagon represents the "Shapers".

The Dragon's Eye is found in the Destiny series of video games, associated with the character Ikora Rey.

== Gallery ==
The 6 lines of the symbol can be seen in 6 edges of the regular tetrahedron (triangular pyramid), as viewed above one of the vertices

Coat of arms of Egg an der Günz, Bavaria, Germany

Logo of the Citgo Petroleum Company

Logo of the video game Ingress

== See also ==
- Junkers, the logo for which resembles the dragon's eye
