= The Dragon's Eye =

Children's books by Kaza Kingsley

The Dragon's Eye is the first book of Erec Rex, a series of children's books by American author Kaza Kingsley. It was first published by Firelight Press, an imprint of Simon and Schuster, in 2006.
