= Andrea Cera =

- Born: 1969 (age 56–57); Vicenza, Italy
- Occupations: electroacoustic composer sound designer sound installation artist
- Website: Official website

Andrea Cera (born 1969 in Vicenza) is an Italian electroacoustic composer, sound designer and sound installation artist.

== Biography ==
Andrea Cera graduated with MA degree (diploma) in piano and music composition at the Conservatorio Cesare Pollini in Padua (Italy). He studied computer music at the Cursus Program on Composition and Computer Music at IRCAM, in Paris.

From 2000 to 2010, Cera has mainly worked with several choreographers including Hervé Robbe at the Centre Chorégraphique National du Havre, Edmond Russo and Shlomi Tuizer, Pascal Montrouge, Les Ballets de Monte Carlo. In the same period he has explored sound art: installation sites have included the Centre Pompidou, Le Fresnoy - Studio national des arts contemporains in Lille-Tourcoing, institutions and art centres in Italy and France. One example of his work is Reactive Ambient Music (2005). This installation is a sort of a waiting room where external sounds of other installations control a generative background music system. In 2004 he realized NightRun, an interactive installation based on the screaming of the visitors. They are here (2008) is an interactive video and sound installation created for the Centquatre-Paris, in collaboration with IRCAM.

After 2010, Andrea Cera focused in research and sound design projects with IRCAM (Paris), NOTAM (Oslo), Integra Project, Infomus – Casa Paganini (Genova). In 2011 he presented Urban Musical Game, in collaboration with researchers from the Real-Time Musical Interactions team at IRCAM – Centre Pompidou, the design agency NoDesign and Phonotonic. For this installation, they used augmented sports balls to manipulate and transform an interactive music environment. Other examples are the collaborations with Renault and IRCAM Sound Perception and Design Team (sounds for the electric vehicle), Phonotonic, the SkAT-VG project (Sketching Audio Technologies using Vocalizations and Gestures, 2014–2017), and a series of works for the Co.Me.DiA European Project. In 2018 he has been nominated for Better Sound (Category: Research & Development) at the ISA International Sound Awards for Renault Symbioz Sound Design. In these same years Cera still kept a few collaborations with dance, theatre and video artist, in particular with ricci/forte, Yan Duyvendak, Francesca Foscarini, and Marie-Laure Cazin (for the project Le Cinéma Emotif, an interactive cinema prototype where the film varies according to the emotions of the spectators, analysed by EEG headsets with electrodes that capture their brain activity - project by M.L.Cazin, music by A. Cera).

In recent years he collaborated with Taiwanese collective Luxury Logico and IRCAM on a robotic installation entitled The Insomnia SketchBook, premiered in 2022, Renault and Jean-Michel Jarre for a new AVAS sound, and with Infomus-CasaPaganini and the Galliera Hospital, for the sound design of DanzArTe, an exergame dedicated to elderly population. He currently is artist-in-residence for the EU funded S+T+ARTS project ReSilence.

Andrea Cera's music is concerned with hybridization and intrusiveness as tools to explore new uses of sound.

== Works ==
=== Music for choreographies (selection) ===
- Hervé Robbe, Permis de construire (2000), music : Andrea Cera
- Hervé Robbe, Mutating Score (2005), music : Andrea Cera
- Edmond Russo, Shlomi Tuizer, Airports (Tenses 1) (2005), music : Andrea Cera
- Hervé Robbe, Wave 03 (2007), music : Andrea Cera
- Edmond Russo, Shlomi Tuizer, Les Avenants (Tenses 2–3) (2007), music : Andrea Cera
- Hervé Robbe, REW (2008), music : Andrea Cera
- Hervé Robbe, Next days (2010), music: Andrea Cera – The Kevi and Deni Project
- Edmond Russo, Shlomi Tuizer, Tempéraments (2014), music : Andrea Cera
- Yan Duyvendak, Sound of Music (2015), music : Andrea Cera
- Francesca Foscarini, Vocazione all'Asimmetria (2016), music: Andrea Cera
- Francesca Foscarini, Animale (2018), music: Andrea Cera

=== Sound installations (selection) ===
- Innig (2002)
- NightRun (2004)
- Nature (2005)
- Undertones (2005)
- Reactive ambient music (2005)
- They are here (2008)
- Urban Musical Game (2011)
- Le Cinéma Emotif (2014), project by M.L.Cazin, music by A. Cera.

=== Instrumental, mixed and electroacoustic music (selection) ===
- Deliverance (1998) soprano saxophone and real time electronics
- MIDIfreaks corridor Catapults (2004) for big-band
- Dueling zombies (2007), for ensemble and real time electronics
- Zoom-Up (2010), networked music for two keyboards and real time electronics
- War Games (2014), for 50 percussion players (festival "Le Printemps des Arts" in Monaco Monte-Carlo)
- "Mademoiselle Paradis", soundtrack by Andrea Cera for an interactive movie by Marie-Laure Cazin (2014), controlled by EEG
- Cinema Emotif, a movie by Marie-Laure Cazin (2014), music by Andrea Cera
- A Christmas Eve (2015), by ricci/forte, music by Andrea Cera
- Sound of Music (2015), conception and artistic direction: Yan Duyvendak, music: Andrea Cera, texts: Christophe Fiat.
- PPP ultimo inventario prima di liquidazione (hommage à Pier Paolo Pasolini) (2016), by ricci/forte, music by Andrea Cera
- TroiloVsCressida (2017), by ricci/forte, sound files by Andrea Cera
- GrandessoCera live concert for Tenor Sakphone and Electronics (2019/2021)

=== Other projects (selection) ===
- Pink Squirrels (2015), text/sound: Andrea Cera; video: Dimitrije Roggero.

== Discography ==
- Trickster Museum, released: 1996, Label: TAUKAY 103, Contemporanea, Format: CD.
- Kevi and Deni, released: 2009, Label: TAUKAY 132, Format: CD.
- Selected Works, vols. 1, 2, 3, 4, released on BandCamp (2019)
- Five Notifications, Five (Pre)Wake-Up Sound, Five Ringtones, released on Bandcamp (2021)

== Music videos ==
- Night Run, 2004, Le Fresnoy, Tourcoing.
- Next Days, 2010, choreography: Hervé Robbe, music: Andrea Cera.
- War Games, 2014, Place du Casino, Monte-Carlo.
- Pink Squirrels, 2015, text/sound: Andrea Cera; video: Dimitrije Roggero.
- Sound of Music, 2015, conception and artistic direction: Yan Duyvendak, music: Andrea Cera, texts: Christophe Fiat.
- A Christmas Eve, 2015, by ricci/forte, music by Andrea Cera.
- PPP ultimo inventario prima di liquidazione (hommage à Pier Paolo Pasolini), 2016, by ricci/forte, music by Andrea Cera.
- TroiloVsCressida, 2017, by ricci/forte, music by Andrea Cera.

== Bibliography (Selection) ==
- Cera, Andrea (2007). "Entretien avec Andrea Cera" (interview by Emanuele Quinz). in Trance, Paris, École nationale supérieure des Beaux-Arts – Anomos, Mosign, 2007, ISBN 978 284056 245 0, pp. 108–113.
- Cera, Andrea (2007), "Noir miroir. Ambiguïtés topographiques, sociales et interactives de la musique". Musique in situ, Circuit. Musiques contemporaines, vol. XVII, no. 3, Montréal, Les presses de l'université de Montréal, 2007, ISBN 978 2 76062074 2, pp. 29–38.
- Cera, Andrea (2008). "Music that listens to what's going to happen: internet enhanced, self-adapting soundscapes". ICMC International Computer Music Conference, Ann Arbor, Michigan: MPublishing, University of Michigan Library, August 2008.
- Rasamimanana, Nicolas – Fléty, Emmanuel – Bevilacqua, Frédéric – Cera, Andrea – Petrevski, Uros – Frechin, Jean-Louis (2012). "The urban musical game: using sport balls as musical interfaces", CHI EA '12 Proceedings of the 2012 ACM annual conference (Conference on Human Factors in Computing Systems), pp. 1027–1030, ACM New York (draft version)
- Cera, Andrea (2013), "Loops, Games and Playful Things". Contemporary Music Review, vol. 32, issue 1, 2013, doi:10.1080/07494467.2013.774122, pp. 29–39.
- Misdariis, Nicolas – Cera, Andrea (2013), "Sound signature of Quiet Vehicles: state of the art and experience feedbacks". Internoise, 2013, Innsbruck, Austria, 15–18 September 2013, pp. 1–10.
- Cera, A., Andrea Mauro, D., & Rocchesso, D. (2016). "Sonic in(tro)spection by vocal sketching". In A. Terzaroli, & A. Valle (a cura di), Extending interactivity. Atti del XXI CIM – Colloquio di Informatica Musicale (pp. 198–202). Cagliari: DADI – Dip. Arti e Design Industriale. Università IUAV di Venezia.
- Misdariis Nicolas – Cera, Andrea (2017). "Recherche-projet en design sonore: le cas emblématique du véhicule électrique", Sciences du design 2017/1, no. 5, Presses Universitaires de France, ISBN 9782130788577.
- Cera, A. (2018). "Three years of fragments: music, sound design, and sketching". Musica/Tecnologia, 12(1), 45–62. doi:10.13128/Music_Tec-23799.
- Delle Monache, S., Rocchesso, D., Bevilacqua, F., Lemaitre, G., Baldan, S., & Cera, A. (2018). "Embodied sound design", International Journal of Human-Computer Studies, 118, 47–59. doi:10.1016/j.ijhcs.2018.05.007
- Cera A. (2019). "How To Remain Successfully Unsuccessful", Links, Series 3–4, Musique – Espace Habité, edited by Hervé Zénouda, pp. 25–31.
- Misdariis, N., Cera, A., Rodriguez, W. (2019). "Electric and Autonomous Vehicle: from Sound Quality to Innovative Sound Design", Proceedings of the 23rd International Congress on Acoustics ICA, 9–13 September 2019 in Aachen, Germany, pp. 7161–7168.
- Camurri Antonio, Seminerio Emanuele, Morganti Wanda, Canepa Corrado, Ferrari Nicola, Ghisio Simone, Cera Andrea, Coletta Paolo, Barbagelata Marina, Puleo Gianluca, Nolasco Ilaria, Costantini Claudio, Senesi Barbara, Pilotto Alberto, "Development and validation of an art-inspired multimodal interactive technology system for a multi-component intervention for older people: a pilot study", Frontiers in Computer Science, VOL. 5, 2024, URL=https://www.frontiersin.org/journals/computer-science/articles/10.3389/fcomp.2023.1290589, DOI=10.3389/fcomp.2023.1290589 (referenced 31/07/24).
