= Kingsley Pinda =

French basketball player

No. 14 – ALM Évreux Basket
- Position: Shooting guard
- League: LNB Pro B

Personal information
- Born: January 30, 1992 (age 34) Paris, France
- Listed height: 1.90 m (6 ft 3 in)

Career information
- Playing career: 2010–present

Career history
- 2010–2013: SLUC Nancy Basket
- 2013–present: ALM Évreux Basket

Kingsley Pinda (born January 30, 1992) is a French professional basketball player who currently plays for ALM Évreux Basket of the LNB Pro B.
