= Samuel Chibueze Chukwuka =

Anglican bishop in Nigeria

Samuel Chibueze Chukwuka was the Anglican Bishop of Isuikwuato in Aba Province of the Church of Nigeria.

He was consecrated as the pioneer Bishop of Isuikwuato on 13 March 2005; he had previously been at All Saints' Cathedral, Onitsha.

He retired in 2013.
