= Kingsley Yeboah =

Ghanaian footballer

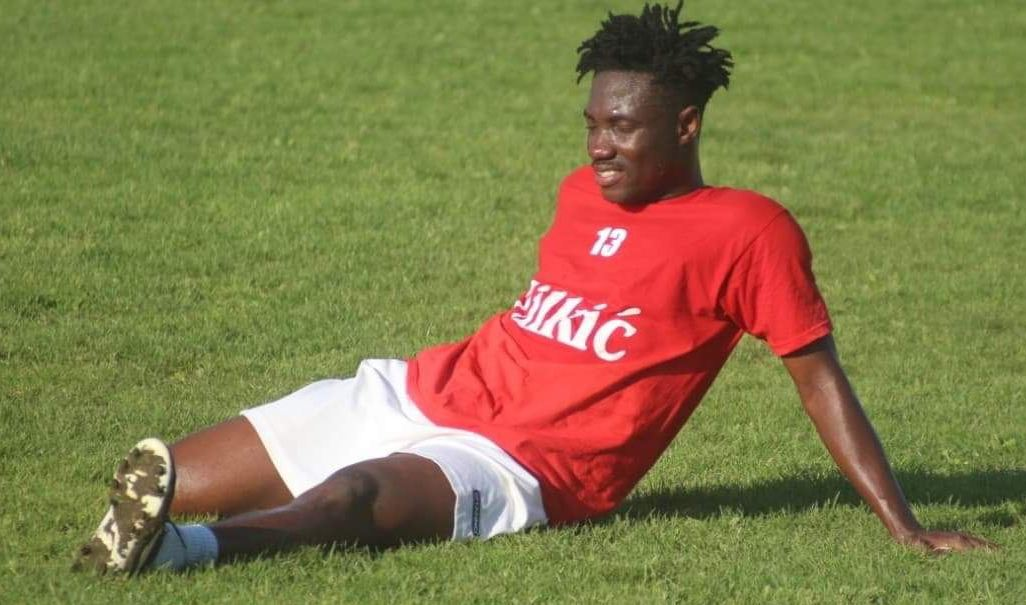

Personal information
- Full name: Kingsley Yeboah
- Date of birth: 1 June 1996 (age 30)
- Place of birth: Accra
- Height: 1.80 m (5 ft 11 in)
- Position: Midfielder

Youth career
- 2012-2015: Dreams FC Youth

Senior career*
Years	Team	Apps	(Gls)
2015-2018	Dreams FC	10	(0)
2018–2019	NK Krivaja Zavidovići	16	(2)
- * Club domestic league appearances and goals as of 6 July 2019

Kingsley Yeboah (born 1 June 1996) is a Ghanaian professional footballer who plays as a midfielder.

== Club career ==
Yeboah joined Dreams FC from their youth club in 2015. He signed a three-year deal. On 24 April 2016, he made his Ghana Premier League debut with Dreams FC against Berekum Chelsea.

=== NK Krivaja Zavidovići ===
Since September 2018, he joined NK Krivaja Zavidovići in Second League of FBiH - North.

== Career statistics ==
=== Club ===
As of 6 July 2019.

Club	Season	League			Cup		Continental		Other		Total	
Club	Season	Division	Apps	Goals	Apps	Goals	Apps	Goals	Apps	Goals	Apps	Goals
Dreams FC	2016	Ghanaian Premier League	10	0	0	0	0	0	0	0	10	0
Career total			10	0	0	0	0	0	0	0	10	0
