= Kingsley Chibueze Onyeukwu =

Nigerian footballer

Personal information
- Date of birth: 17 July 1991 (age 35)
- Place of birth: Owerri, Nigeria
- Height: 1.85 m (6 ft 1 in)
- Position: Midfielder

Team information
- Current team: Benfica e Castelo Branco

Senior career*
Years	Team	Apps	(Gls)
2013–2014	Freamunde	3	(0)
2014	AD Oliveirense	13	(0)
2015	Beira-Mar	19	(0)
2016–2017	AD Oliveirense	7	(0)
2017–2018	Amarante	21	(2)
2018–2020	Anadia	26	(1)
2020–2021	Oliveira do Hospital	19	(0)
2021–	Benfica e Castelo Branco		
- * Club domestic league appearances and goals ‡ National team caps and goals as of 26 August 2021

Kingsley Chibueze Onyeukwu // (born 17 July 1991) is a Nigerian football midfielder who plays for Benfica e Castelo Branco. He played on the Portuguese second tier for Beira-Mar.
