= Dragon's Eye: A Chinese Noir =

2004 novel by Andy Oakes

- First edition cover
- Author: Andy Oakes
- Publisher: Overlook Press
- Publication date: April 26, 2004
- ISBN: 978-1-58567-495-4

Dragon's Eye: A Chinese Noir is a 2004 novel by British writer Andy Oakes. It draws heavily on noir influences, particularly the hardboiled detective aspect of film noir and has been referenced as neo-noir novel.

== Plot summary ==
The protagonist of the story is Sun Piao, a Chief Investigator of the Shanghai Public Security Bureau Homicide Department. He has a sidekick of sorts, an overweight and spirited rural Chinese, Yaobang. Sun Piao is a jaded, righteous man determined to do his job and with a reputation for being good at it; alternatively, he is the archetypical hardboiled detective of film noir: cynical, pessimistic and somewhat self-destructive.

The storyline of the book revolves around an investigation of several horrifically - but surgically - mutilated corpses, all chained around their necks and ankles, and one night resting on the muddy banks of the Huangpu, near the Bund.

Other characters in the book worth noting are Barbara Hayes - an American politician who goes to Shanghai in search of her missing son, Chief Liping (a Party member several grades higher than Sun) and an Englishman named Charles Haven.
