= Peoples Democratic Party (Nigeria) =

Political party in Nigeria

- Abbreviation: PDP
- National Chairman: Kabiru Tanimu Turaki
- Deputy National Chairman South: Taofeek Arapaja
- Acting National Secretary: Vacant
- Founders: Alex Ekwueme; Jerry Gana and others: Tony Anenih; Solomon Lar; Abubakar Rimi; Bola Ige; Sule Lamido; Adamu Ciroma; Iyorchia Ayu; Bamanga Tukur
- Founded: 31 August 1998; 28 years ago
- Preceded by: G-34 group
- Headquarters: Wadata Plaza, Michael Okpara Way, Wuse Zone 5, Abuja
- Ideology: Social conservatism; Economic liberalism; Big tent
- Political position: Centre-right
- Regional affiliation: Democrat Union of Africa
- Colours: Green, white, red
- Slogan: Power to the people
- Seats in the Senate: 4 / 109 (4%)
- Seats in the House: 72 / 360 (20%)
- Governorships: 0 / 36 (0%)
- Seats in state Houses of Assembly: 329 / 991 (33%)

Website
- peoplesdemocraticparty.com.ng

The Peoples Democratic Party (PDP) is one of the two major contemporary political parties in Nigeria, along with its main rival, the All Progressives Congress (APC).

Its policies generally lie towards the center-right of the political spectrum. It won every presidential election between 1999 and 2011. Until the 2015 elections, it was the governing party in the Fourth Republic, although several elections during this period were disputed.

== History ==
The PDP grew out of the anti-Sani Abacha military rule groups: G-18 led by Abubakar Rimi, and its successor, G-34, led by Alex Ekwueme. On 19 August 1998, since the beginning of the transition to civilian rule under Abdulsalami Abubakar, 25 political associations, including the All Nigerian Congress (ANC), Peoples Consultative Forum (PCF), Social Political Party (SPP), Peoples Democratic Movement (PDM), and Peoples National Forum (PNF), resolved to form a Peoples Democratic Party. The party was launched in Abuja on 31 August 1998. The founding chairman of the Steering Committee was Alex Ekwueme, and the Secretary was Jerry Gana.

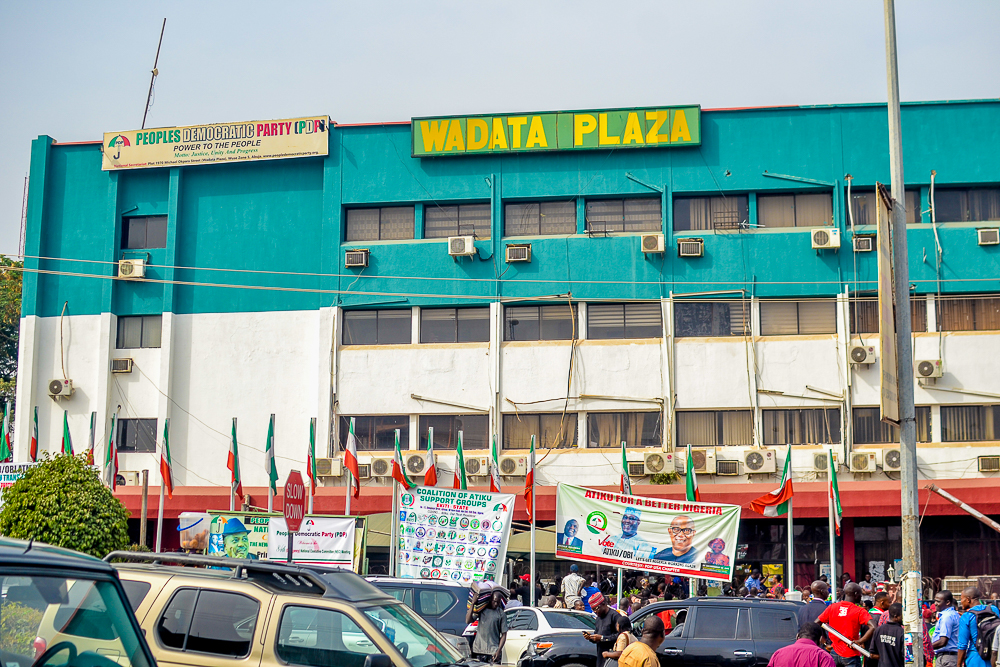
PDP National Headquarters, Abuja

In 1998, the PDP in its first presidential primary election held in Jos, Plateau State, North Central Nigeria nominated former military leader Olusegun Obasanjo who had just been released from detention as political prisoner as the presidential candidate in the elections of February 1999, with Atiku Abubakar (Governor-Elect of Adamawa State and a former leading member of the Social Democratic Party) as his running mate. They won the presidential election and were inaugurated on 29 May 1999.

In the legislative election held on 12 April 2003, the party won 54.5% of the popular vote and 223 out of 360 seats in the House of Representatives, and 76 out of 109 seats in the Senate. Its candidate in the presidential election of 19 April 2003, Olusegun Obasanjo, was re-elected with 61.9% of the vote. In December 2006, Umaru Yar'Adua (formerly of the Peoples Redemption Party and the Social Democratic Party) was chosen as the presidential candidate of the ruling PDP for the April 2007 general election, receiving 3,024 votes from party delegates; his closest rival, Rochas Okorocha, received only 372 votes. Yar'Adua was eventually declared the winner of the 2007 general elections, held on April 21, and was sworn in on May 29, 2007, amid widespread allegations of electoral fraud. In the Nigerian National Assembly election, the party won 260 out of 360 seats in the House of Representatives and 85 out of 109 seats in the Senate. At the PDP's 2008 National Convention, it chose Prince Vincent Ogbulafor as its National Chairman on March 8, 2008. Ogbulafor, who was the PDP's National Secretary from 2001 to 2005, was the party's consensus choice for the position of National Chairman, selected as an alternative to the rival leading candidates Sam Egwu (who was backed by Obasanjo) and Anyim Pius Anyim. All 26 other candidates, including Egwu and Anyim, withdrew in favor of Ogbulafor. Meanwhile, Alhaji Abubakar Kawu Baraje was elected as National Secretary.

In 2011, after the Peoples Democratic Party saw members defect for the Action Congress of Nigeria, some political commentators suspected that the PDP would lose the Presidency. Following PDP candidate Goodluck Jonathan's victory in the 2011 election, it was reported that there were violent protests from northern youth.

== Slogans ==
The longtime slogan of the PDP is "Power to the people". During the party's National Convention in Port Harcourt, Rivers State on 21 May 2016, David Mark, a former President of the Senate of Nigeria, introduced "Change the change" as the party's campaign slogan for the 2019 general elections. However, in 2018, the chairman of the party's board of trustees stated that neither the slogan nor the party's umbrella symbol would be changed.

== Political ideology ==
The party has a neoliberal stance in its economic policies and maintains a conservative stance on certain social issues, such as same-sex relations.

=== Social issues ===
The PDP is against same-sex relations and favors social conservatism on moral and religious grounds. In 2007, the PDP-dominated National Assembly sponsored a bill to outlaw homosexual relations, making it punishable by law for up to 14 years in prison.

The party is a moderate advocate of ⁣⁣state⁣⁣ autonomy and religious freedom for the Nigerian states. In the year 2000, the introduction of Islamic law in some states in Northern Nigeria triggered⁣⁣ sectarian violence in Kaduna and Abia states. The PDP-led federal government refused to bow to pressure from the southern, predominantly Christian states to repeal the law and instead opted for a compromise where Islamic law would only apply to Muslims.

Tunde Ayeni, chairman of the PDP fundraising event in December 2014 who donated N2 billion, was involved in the mismanagement of the bank's funds.

=== Economic issues ===
The PDP favors free-market policies which support economic liberalism, and limited government regulation. In 2003, President Olusegun Obasanjo and Finance Minister Ngozi Okonjo-Iweala embarked on an economic reform program, which reduced government spending through conservative fiscal policies and saw the deregulation and privatization of numerous industries in Nigerian services sector — notably the Nigerian Telecommunications (NITEL) industry. On the other hand, the PDP adopts a more leftist stance towards poverty and welfare. In 2005, President Obasanjo launched Nigeria's first National Health Insurance Scheme (NHIS) to ensure that every Nigerian has access to basic health care services.

The PDP strives to maintain the status quo on oil revenue distribution. Though the PDP government set up the Niger Delta Development Commission (NDDC) to address the needs of the oil-producing Niger Delta states, it has rebuffed repeated efforts to revert to the 50% to 50% federal-to-state government revenue allocation agreement established in 1966 during the First Republic.

== 2015 elections ==
In the 2015 elections, the incumbent president and PDP presidential nominee, Goodluck Jonathan, was defeated by General Muhammadu Buhari of the All Progressives Congress by 55% to 45%, losing by 2.6 million votes out of approximately 28.6 million valid votes cast. Out of Nigeria's 36 states and the Federal Capital Territory, General Muhammadu Buhari won 21 states, while President Goodluck Jonathan won 15 states and the Federal Capital Territory.

== 2019 elections ==
In the 2019 elections which was won by then-incumbent President Muhammadu Buhari, former vice president and PDP presidential candidate Atiku Abubakar, together with his party, rejected the outcome of the elections as INEC was yet to conclude the process and make an official pronouncement. On 25 February, PDP National Party Chair Prince Uche Secondus alleged that the result as announced by INEC were incorrect.

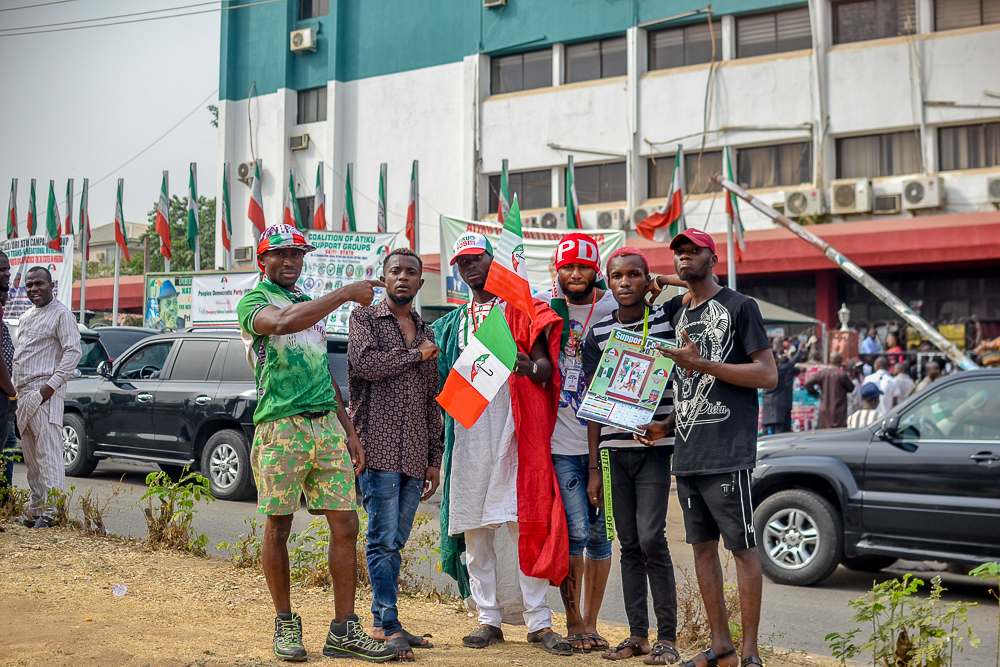
PDP supporters during a political rally at the party headquarters

== 2020 elections ==
Godwin Obaseki won re-election as the Governor of Edo State on 20 September 2020. PDP won with 307,955 votes, defeating sixteen opponents. Security was tight, and voters took health precautions in the wake of the COVID-19 pandemic that had infected 57,000 and killed 1,100.

== Leadership crisis ==
In April 2026, the Supreme Court of Nigeria invalidated the PDP factional convention held in Ibadan in November 2025, ruling that it violated an existing court order. The judgment nullified the leadership produced by the convention and upheld the suspension of key party officials, leading the party's Board of Trustees to assume interim leadership.

== Election results ==
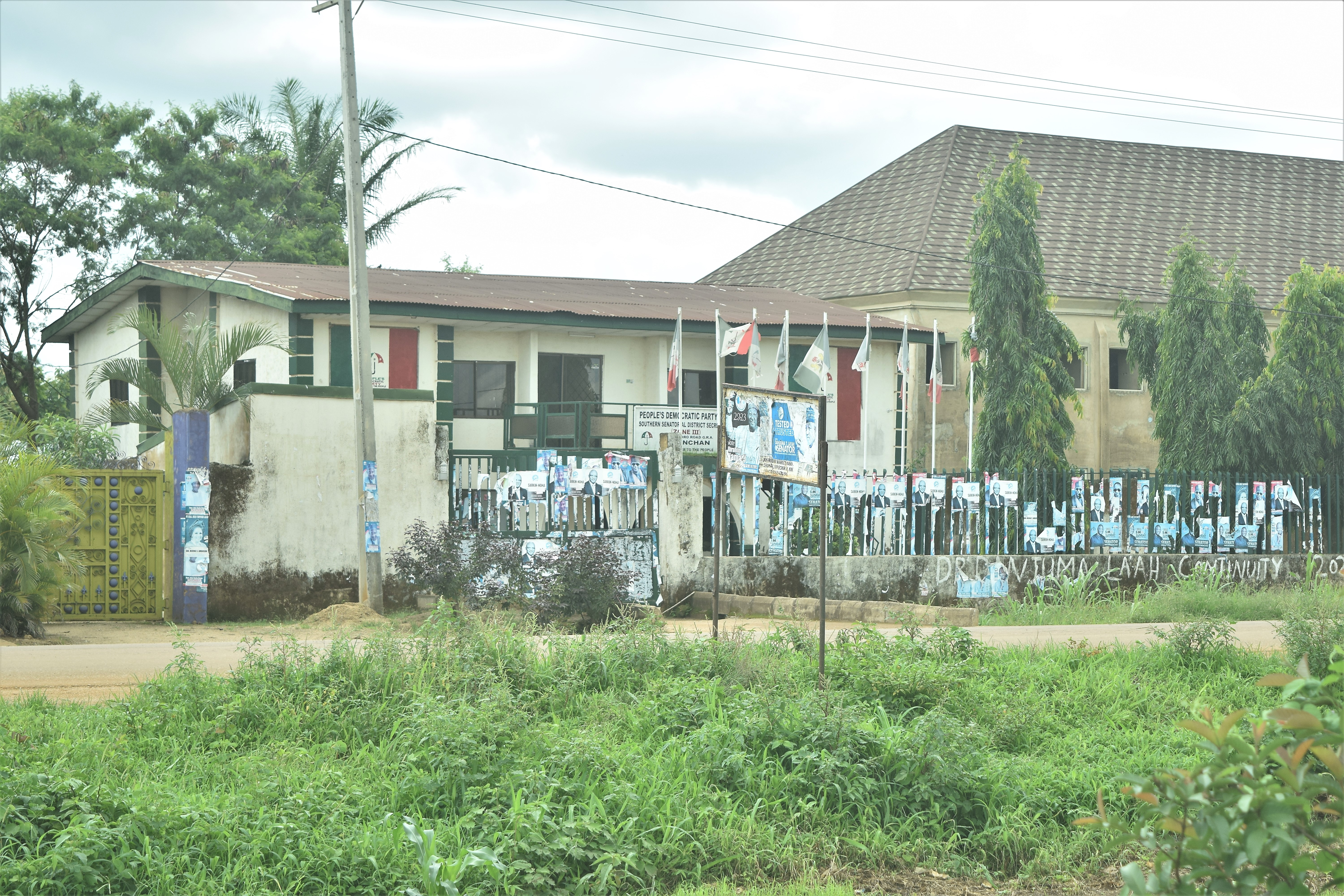
PDP office along Kafanchan-Kagoro road, Kafanchan

=== Presidential elections ===
Election	Party candidate	Running mate	Votes	%	Result
1999	Olusegun Obasanjo	Atiku Abubakar	18,738,154	62.78%	Elected ✓
2003	Olusegun Obasanjo	Atiku Abubakar	24,456,140	61.94%	Elected ✓
2007	Umaru Yar'Adua	Goodluck Jonathan	24,638,063	69.82%	Elected ✓
2011	Goodluck Jonathan	Namadi Sambo	22,495,187	58.89%	Elected ✓
2015	Goodluck Jonathan	Namadi Sambo	12,853,162	44.96%	Lost ✗
2019	Atiku Abubakar	Peter Obi	11,262,978	41.22%	Lost ✗
2023	Atiku Abubakar	Ifeanyi Okowa	6,984,520	29.07%	Lost ✗

=== House of Representatives and Senate elections ===
Election	House of Representatives					Senate				
Election	Votes	%	Seats	+/–	Position	Votes	%	Seats	+/–	Position
1999		57.1%	206 / 360	▲206	▲1st		56.4%	59 / 109	▲59	▲1st
2003	15,927,807	54.49%	223 / 360	▲17	1st	15,585,538	53.69%	76 / 109	▲17	1st
2007			262 / 360	▲39	1st			85 / 109	▲9	1st
2011	13,312,817	46.63%	203 / 360	▼59	1st					
2015			140 / 360	▼63	▼2nd			49 / 109	▼15	▼2nd
2019	11,283,714	41.34%	115 / 360	▼25	2nd	11,608,069	41.87%	45 / 109	▼4	2nd
2023			119 / 360	▲4	2nd			37 / 109	▼8	2nd

== See also ==
- List of state parties of the Peoples Democratic Party (Nigeria)
- Yahuza Ado
