= GIG Logistics =

Nigerian logistic services company

- Company type: Private
- Industry: Logistics
- Founder: Chidi Ajaere
- Headquarters: Lagos, Nigeria
- Key people: Chidi Ajaere (Founder/Chairman)
- Services: E-commerce logistics; social commerce logistics; mobile commerce logistics
- Number of employees: 800+
- Website: giglogistics.com

GIG Logistics (GIGL) is a courier and logistics services company headquartered in Lagos, Nigeria. Incorporated in 2012, it is a subsidiary of the GIG Group, an intelligence and technology management company based in Nigeria. The company has service centres in Nigeria, Ghana and the United States of America.

GIGL's services and products include courier services, mobile, social and e-commerce logistics, delivery services, on-board courier services, imports, packaging, mailroom management, and relocation services.

== Overview ==
GIG Logistics was founded by tech entrepreneur Chidi Ajaere, who is also the chief executive officer (CEO) of GIG Mobility, a distinct company with its own assets and separate operations. In 2014, GIGL incorporated technology to track all ground shipments electronically. In 2017, GIGL opened its office in Houston, Texas and expanded to Ghana in 2019.

In 2019, GIGL launched GIGGo, an on-demand delivery app that allows its customers request pickup and delivery of items without visiting a service centre.

== Partnerships ==
In partnership with Aim Higher Africa, GIGL launched a "Back-2-School Giveaway" in 2019, where school backpacks filled with school supplies are given to children residing in low-income communities in Ghana.

Following the ban of motorcycle taxis in parts of Lagos, Nigeria in January 2020, motorcycle taxi-hailing companies entered into discussions with GIGL in a bid to convert their motorcycles into dispatch vehicles under the company.

In 2020, Jet Motor Company, an African automobile manufacturer announced that it entered a partnership with GIGL that would see the GIGL's service centres in Nigeria serve as charging stations for electric vehicles, while GIGL adds a number of Jet Motor's electric vehicles to its fleet.

Due to a COVID-19 lockdown imposed in Lagos in April 2020, GIGL partnered with Pistis Foundation to deliver food to the needy around the city.
