= GIG Mobility =

Nigerian bus company (e. 1998)

- Type: Private
- Industry: Transportation
- Founded: 1998 in Edo State, Nigeria
- Founder: Edwin Ajaere
- Headquarters: Nigeria
- Number of locations: 34 Bus Terminals
- Area served: Lagos; Edo; Abuja; Abia; Akwa-Ibom; Anambra; Bayelsa; Delta; Enugu; Imo; Kaduna; Rivers; Plateau; Accra; Kumasi
- Key people: Chidi Ajaere (Chairman, CEO)
- Services: Inter State Bus Transportation; Flight Booking; Vehicle Hire; Curated Travel & Tours
- Parent: Greatman Legend (formerly The GIG-Group)
- Website: https://gigm.com/

GIG Mobility (GIGM, formerly God is Good Motors) is a Nigerian mobility company, founded and headquartered in Benin City, Nigeria. GIGM currently operates in Nigeria and Ghana, West Africa. It was established in 1998 and is known for moving thousands of commuters daily across Nigeria and Ghana.

== History ==
GIG Mobility, then God is Good Motors, was founded by the enterprising couple Edwin and Stella Ajaere in 1998 to provide bus services across Nigerian cities. Their son, Chidi Ajaere, took over administration of the company which led to a reinvention of the business in 2010.

Since becoming GIG Mobility, the company has also seen a number of structural adjustments and has spun off a number of services powered by technology.

In 2019, GIGM expanded outside Nigeria and launched in Ghana with operating terminals in Accra and Kumasi, two of the country's business enclaves. In February 2020, GIGM's interface hinted at the launch of an intra-city transport service that would be technology-powered, called Danfo.

== Timeline ==
- 1998 - founded as God is Good Motors
- 2015 - renamed to GIGM.com and launched online booking
- 2016 - launched its mobile app; the GIGM App
- 2019 - changed name to GIG Mobility
- 2019 - expanded operations into Ghana
- 2026 - launch of hireXbyGIGM and PASSbyGIGM

== Services ==
GIG Mobility provides intercity bus transportation and digital travel-booking services in Nigeria and Ghana. Its services have expanded to include vehicle hire, airline ticket reservations and tourism-related offerings.
