= List of villages in Delta State =

Villages in Delta state, Nigeria

This is a list of villages and settlements in Delta State, Nigeria arranged by Local Government Area (L.G.A) and district/area (with postal codes also given).

== By postal code ==
Below is a list of polling units, that includes villages and schools, arranged by postal code.

LGA	District / Area	Postal code	Villages
Aniocha North	Ezechime	320110	Abudalo Camp; Ezi; Ikem Camp; Isa-Ogwashi; Issele-Azagba; Issele Ukwu; Obior; Obomkpa; Ogbeanei Camp; Okofia Camp; Onicha Olona; Onicha Ugbo; Onicha-Uku
Aniocha North	Idumuje	320111	Idumuje-Ugboko; Idumuje-Unor; Idumuogo; Ugboba; Ugodor; Ukunzu
Aniocha North	Odiani	320112	Anioma; Ubulubu; Ugbodu; Ukwu-Nzu
Aniocha South	Nsukwa	320109	Aba Unor; Adonta; Ani Usi; Aniefume; Azamu; Ejeme; Ejeme Aniogo; Ewulu; Isheagwu; Nkpulu Camp; Nsukwa; Obi Adigwe; Obi Anigala; Obi Ashimili; Obi Chukuji; Obi Dugbo; Obi Emenen; Obi Nti; Obi Okonkwo; Obi Owodi; Ogidi; Ukwu Oba; Umudike; Umute
Aniocha South	Ogwashi-Uku	320107	Abo-Ogwashi; Azabba-Ogwashi; Edo-Ogwashi; Isah-Ogwashi; Ogwashi-Uku; Olodu-Ogwashi; Otulu-Ogwashi
Aniocha South	Ubulu	320108	Ubulu Ukwu, Abugba; Aniefume; Anifekide; Ashama; Egbudu; Ubulu-Okiti; Ubulu-Unor
Bomadi	Akugbene Men	333101	Ajogbabri; Akugbene; Bomadi; Ekametagbene; Esama; Ezebiri; Gbaregolo; Kolafiogbene; Kpakiama; Oboro; Ogbeinyama; Ogriagbene; Ogundobiri; Okoloba; Okpokhunu
Bomadi	Tarakiri	333102	Adobu; Agoloma; Aven; Bolou Apelebiri; Bolou-Angiama; Odorubu; Odurubu; Ogo-Eze; Toru-Angiama; Toru-Apelebiri; Uduobori; Uduophori
Burutu	Burutu-Forcados	332105	Burutu; Forçados; Keremor
Burutu	Iduwuni	332106	Kolorugbene; Odimodi; Osamayigben
Burutu	Ngbilebiri-Mein/Ogbulubiri/	332109	Agbodobiri; Akparemogbene; Amasuomo; Ayakoromo; Biokorgha; Egodor; Egolegbene; Gbekebor; Kiagbo; New Town; Ngbilebiri; Ogbeingbene; Ogbolubiri; Okrika; Yayorogbene; Zion-Oyagbene
Burutu	Obatebe	332108	Abadima; Ekorogbene; Kalafiognene; Kenlogbene; Obatebe; Opuapale
Burutu	Ogulagha	332107	Benibayo; Ogulagha; Yobebe; Yokrisobo
Burutu	Operemor	332110	Abadiama; Bolu-Ojobo; Bulou-Ndoro; Egrangbene; Ekogbene; Ekumugbene; Ojobo; Rougbene
Burutu	Seimibiri	332111	Dunu-Ogusu; Edegbene; Nikorogha; Oboro; Ogbene; Okpokunon; Okuama
Burutu	Tuomo	332112	Boluo-Tamigbe; Botu-Mangbebe; Bulou-Tebegbe; Douebido-Zion; Founkoro-Gbene; Isreallo-Zion; Ogbogbabene; Toru-Temigbe; Torugbene; Toubo Town
Ethiope East	Abraka	330106	Abraka; Ajalomi; Akpoho; Ekerejeta; Erho; Ofuoma; Ogheje; Okagbara; Okagbare; Oria; Ugolo; Umeghe; Urhuagbesa; Urhuogo Inland; Urhuoka; Urhuovie; Urhuovie Inland
Ethiope East	Agbon	330105	Adarode; Asoro; Edafe; Egbogho; Ekirigbo; Ekpan; Ekraka; Ekrudu; Eku; Emakpo; Emehwu; Erhokori; Ibada-Okueghavbo; Ichikirhe; Iguh; Kokori Inland; Obueghavbo; Oburobi; Oghoghome; Oguma; Ogurivwe Utuyo; Okorogba; Okpara Inland; Okpara W/Side; Okriore; Okuaghamu; Okuekpagha; Okuekpagha Etc.; Okuemaka-Okuodo; Okuighele; Okuimodje; Okuisiorho; Okuke; Okuloho; Okune; Okuokpokpo; Okurhokpe; Okurishue; Okurode Osajaye; Okuronika; Okuroworho; Okuruvo; Okwe-chi; Olukobare; Omukufor; Onnumane; Orhokpo; Orhono/Area; Otumara; Oviorie; Ovu-Inland; Ovwere; Samagidi; Umuahwa
Ethiope East	Isiokolo	330104	Isiokolo-Urban
Ethiope West	Jesse	331102	Adjekerieda; Adjikakiti; Adjikpotor; Ajavwini-Irhodo; Akpobome; Atiwor; Boboroku; Edjeba; Eghvwa; Ejeketa; Ejenesa; Esimagbokor; Evwenegbor II; Evwenogbo I; Ibada; Idjedaka; Jessa; Mosogar; Oge; Oghobaye; Okinigho; Okuagbaye-; Okueka; Okuno; Okuode Hwojer; Okuodibo; Okuoede; Okuogo; Okuokpokpo; Okuokporua; Onyobru Inland; Osoguo; Otefe; Otumara; Ovade; Ovwiomugo; Oyobru W/Side; Ugbakele; Ugbevbe; Ugbevwe; Ugbokpa ugbomoja; Ugbomoja-Inland; Ukuegbagha; W/Side
Ethiope West	Oghara	331101	Ajagbodulu; Arherhi; Edjemuon Yavwe; Egbeku; Egbo; Ewurihie; Ijomi; Inland; Obitekpagha; Obramudu; Oghara-Ferry-Camp; Ogharefe; Oghareki; Ogomee; Ohrumudu; Okorinebra; Okuekpere; Okurho; Okwirie Ovwai; Otefe; Otumara; Ovade; Ovwuovwu; Pamol-Rubber-Estate; Sapele Overside; Ugbakele; Ugbevwe-Okurho; Umoro
Ika North East	Akumazi	321108	Akuku-Akumazi; Akumazi; Ase; Etiti; Idumuigwe; Idumuobi; Isiube; Obi-Quarter; Oduga; Owerr-Olubor; Umuagboma; Umukpulu
Ika North East	Idumuesan	321112	Aliegbo; Alilor; Aliobume; Aliojeh; Idumu-Ukpa; Idumu-Uzougbo
Ika North East	Igbodo	321113	Aniekpukwu; Anieyime; Idumuobior; Idumuozeh; Ilabor; Isaiah Camp; Ndobu
Ika North East	Mbiri	321106	Agban; Ikeze; Itamuzun; Mbiri Farm Settlement; Obi; Ugbeka
Ika North East	Otolokpo	321110	Achara; Alugba; Idumu-Obi; Obume; Okete; Orji; Umuhu
Ika North East	Owa (S)	321105	Boji-Boji-Owa; Owa-Oyibu; Owa-Alero; Owa-Alidinma; Owa-Aliozomor; Owa-Ekei; Owa-Ofie; Owanta-Idumuetor
Ika North East	Umunede	321107	Idumu-Ile; Idumu-Oba; Idumu-Uleje; Obi; Umunede
Ika North East	Ute-Obgute-Eje	321109	Akpama; Aninwachokor; Imike; Ogbe-akpu; Ogbe-Obi
Ika North East	Ute-Okpu	321111	Ibiegwa; Ogbe; Ute-Alohen; Ute-Enugu; Ute-Erumu; Ute-Owerri
Ika South	Abavor	321102	Abamise; Abavor; Azuowa; Ebudo; Ekuoma; Evbe; Idumueha; Idumuehe; Idumute; Igbogi; Obi-Anyima; Odopo; Ogbe-Iwase; Oyoko; Udomi; Ughie; Umuosi
Ika South	Agbor (rural)	321101	Aliokpu; Agbor Town; Agbor-Nta; Aliagwa; Alihagwu; Alihame; Alisimie; Alisor; Boji-Boji Agbor; Emutu; Ewuru; Ihuiyase; Obi-Oblibe; Oki; Omumu; Oruru; Owanta; Ozanogogo
Ika South	Agbor (S)	321103	Agbor-Town; Ebuku-Agbor
Ika South	Owa (S)	321104	Agbor-Alidima; Owa-Alidima
Isoko North	Ellu	334113	Aja; Anthony-Camp; Aradhe; Dosiah-Camp; Ellu; Idoni; Ilaya-Camp; Ishakor-Camp; Oba-Camp; Okoro-Egbe-Camp; Ovrode-Camp; Ughusi-Camp; Urueme-Camp
Isoko North	Emevor	334116	Egbahe; Egubi-Camp; Emevor; Hope-Camp; Ivrogbo; Ofagbe-Emevor; Ogbrohe; Ojevbe; Omoka-Camp; Ovara; Oviri-Camp; Oyaro; Ubirioho-Camp; Utathe
Isoko North	Iyede	334118	Alagba; Ehor; Ekiugbo; Erioja-Camp; Ewhokpokpo; Ewhusigba; Iwride-Iyede; Ogewho; Oghara-Iyede; Oghenerurie; Omokpara-Camp; Oteri; Otor-Iyede; Ulli-Iyede
Isoko North	Ofagbe	334114	Eziro; Ivre-Camp; Ofagbe; Ovrode; Ovrpe
Isoko North	Okpe/Isoko	334115	Ige; Itebiege; Okpe-Isoko; Osabai-Okpor-Camp
Isoko North	Owhe	334112	Akiewe; Christopher-Camp; Ebregbegbu-Camp; Edhemoko; Ekreka; Ekreze-Camp; Eniagbedhi; Enuru; Eruwha; Eyaziaru; Iluelogbo; Kenan-Oehe-Camp; Oboro-Camp; Odor-Camp; Okeleza-Camp; Okwegbede-Camp; Otibio; Otie; Otor; Urude-Camp
Isoko North	Ozoro	334111	Idaigbo; Inime-Camp; Okpaile; Otovo-Camp; Ozoro
Isoko South	Avoara	334103	Aberuo; Araya; Aviara; Egbeme; Ewhokpaka; Iwre Erero; Okakero Aberuo; Okpara; Okpawha; Otoka Aviara; Sapele Aviara; Ughelli Aviara; Ukpude
Isoko South	Emede	334104	Bluff Camp; Ekeme; Emede; Ewokpaso; Iwro Ukwowhe; Okpaoku; Ovie; Uriowha
Isoko South	Enhwe	334108	Enhwe; Esiyoma Camp; Ewu Village; Iwhremarieta; Iwre Moha; Uroroke Camp; Uzagu Camp
Isoko South	Igbide	334107	Amadedho Camp; Awa-Igbide; Egbo; Ekparekpa Camp; Eqokpaso Camp; Etivori Camp; Ewhoke Camp; Igbide; Iwre Ekpo Camp; Lagos Igbide; Okoogbe Camp; Okpakefe Camp; Okparude Camp; Oruzu Camp; Oteri; Otoka Camp; Owodokpokpo; Ubrotor Camp; Umuneh Camp; Uruovo
Isoko South	Irri I, II	334102	Ada-Irri; Bly Imawa Camp; Company Camp; Edadaimoni Camp; Emonina Camp; German Camp; God Day Camp; Idheze-Irri; Ididiri Camp; Ikpide-Irri; Ivori-Irri; Ivrogbo-Irri; Iwhreogboko Irri; Iwre Idheze; Kenan-Irri; Longhes Camp; Ogbirissa Camp; Orie Irri; Oru-Irogbo Camp; Oshitoke Camp; Ozeh; Udo Edu Camp; Udo-Irri; Utue-Irri
Isoko South	Oleh I, II	334101	Amiere; Emesonye; Oleh; Olicha
Isoko South	Olomoro	334105	Erigodo; Ikiagbodo; Ikiakutu; Iwride; Okowe; Olomoro; Oviri; Ujewe; Usiogha Camp
Isoko South	Oyede	334117	Bethel-Oyede; Egwe Camp-2; Egwe-Camp-I; Odoga-Oyede; Oyedo
Isoko South	Umeh	334110	College-Ifi; Ekpiku-Camp; Enoko-Camp; Enuado-Camp; Idiki-Ifi; Idudu-Camp; Ighomerehor-Camp; Iwre-Kokro; Iwre-Ogilala-Camp; Iwre-Okoro; Iwre-Oso; Iwre-Otoga-Camp; Iwre-Wede; Iwrenuawor; Iwrewekpe; Joseph; Makowere-Camp; Ohoro; Okpadoghi-Camp; Onomator-Water-way; Ozeriwe-Camp; Ozigbo-Camp; Udhe; Ukpe-Camp; Umeh; Utakene; Utaohama-Camp
Isoko South	Umeh / Erohwa	334109	Adosere Camp; Akasa Camp; Aladhe; Anleze; Arloya; Asowakpe Camp; College Ifi; Ekpiku Camp; Emiado Camp; Erowha; Horabedy; Idike Ifi; Idulu Camp; Ighomareno Camp; Ikiagbodo; Irekakporvre; Iroja Okor Camp; Iwhre Oso; Iwhrenuawor; Iwhrewokpe; Iworagbata; Iwrajgbon; Iwrawa Uki; Iwre Anibeze; Iwre Mede; Iwre Ogilalo Camp; Iwre Ogrogro; Iwre Okoro; Iwre Otoga Camp; Iwre Tughou; Iwre Urhobo; Iwreagba; Iwrein Isha; Iwrekpodudu; Iwresade; Iwrin Kuku; Iwrologbo; Makome Camp; Okemate; Okosun Camp; Okpadoghri Camp; Omoato Camp; Onarero; Ozariwi Camp; Ozigbo Camp; Udle Ohororo; Ukare Camp; Ukpe Camp; Umeh; Utakeme Camp; Utakene; Utochame Camp
Isoko South	Uzere	334106	Abale Camp; Ekregbesi; Ezede Camp; Iboro Camp; Orele Camp; Uzere
Ndokwa East	Abara-Uno	322136	Abara-Obodo; Abarra-Osshimili; Abarra-Uno; Ajuju; Kamaro; Ofia Ishubom; Osumei
Ndokwa East	Aboh	322116	Abalagada; Aboh; Abuator; Azu-Aboh; Ede-Agiliga; Ede-Ugbama; Etili; Ise-Onukpor; Obodo-Ugbome; Ogborgu; Okoliko; Okpokrika; Umugbome
Ndokwa East	Adiai	322125	Obiaka; Obiofu; Utu; Utuechi
Ndokwa East	Afor	322130	Iselegu; Obetim-Uno; Ogbodigbo; Ogboti; Okolori; Umuachi; Umuaci-Ogo; Umuokpala
Ndokwa East	Akarai	322118	Afiankwo; Akarai-Eti; Akarai-Obodo; Iyowu; Umutu
Ndokwa East	Ase	322126	Asaba-Assay; Ase; Ekelegbesi; Ise-Ogboko; Iwene; Obodobra
Ndokwa East	Ashaka	322124	Asaba-Ashaka; Ashaka; Ashibalam; Egwedhe; Obi-Ivi; Obi-Izeh
Ndokwa East	Beneku	322137	Beneku; Umuedem; Umuigwe; Agidigbo; Umuede-Ise
Ndokwa East	Ibedeni	322122	Azagba; Ekpe; Ibedeni; Osafu
Ndokwa East	Ibrede	322117	Anyama; Awah; Ibrede; Iyede-Ame; Lagos-Iyede; Ogege-Ibrede; Oka
Ndokwa East	Igbuku	322120	Igbuku; Oko; Ovala; Shugume; Ughelli
Ndokwa East	Inyi	322134	Inyi; Ogbete; Umuagwuyam-Ogo; Umuogu
Ndokwa East	Obikwele	322132	Obi-Atu; Obi-Umuanuku; Obikwele; Osenikpe
Ndokwa East	Okpai	322127	Anieze; Ashaka-Okpai; Ibusa; Obi-Ekuku; Obi-Usuani; Obodoyibo; Okpai-Obeze; Okpai-Oluchi; Umuagulu; Umuedem; Umugbome
Ndokwa East	Onogboko	322119	Abare; Abo; Nwukpe; Onogboko
Ndokwa East	Onuaboh	322131	Akpununu; Obotu; Ogwashi; Onuaboh; Umuechi-Obiofu; Umuechi-Osuani
Ndokwa East	Onyah	322129	Abuator; Eke-Okpokri; Obieki; Onyah; Osekwenike; Osifo; Oworobia; Utu-Okwume
Ndokwa East	Ossissa	322133	Lepper Camp; Obi-Igbo; Oloa; Ossaissa; Umu-Unor
Ndokwa East	Umuolu	322121	Agadabili; Ugbome; Umu-Ijolo; Umu-Inalu; Umu-Oji-Obele; Umudu
Ndokwa East	Ushie	322123	Abalam; Obi-Anwu; Obi-Mgbaragu; Ugute; Ushie
Ndokwa East	Utchi	322135	Asaba-Utchi; Mili-Uku; Onicha-Utchi; Owele-Okumedo; Umuochi; Utchi
Ndokwa East	Utuoko	322128	Utuoku; Warri-Utuoku
Ndokwa West	Abbi	322104	Elovie; Umia; Okwele; Inam-Abbi; Owah-Abbi
Ndokwa West	Emu	322102	Emu-ebendo; Emu-Iyasele; Emu-Obiogo; Emu-Obodeti; Emu-Uno
Ndokwa West	Ogume	322103	Igbe; Obodugwa; Ogbagu; Ogbe-Ogume; Ogbole; Ugute; Umuchime; Utue-Ogume
Ndokwa West	Onicha-Ukwuani	322106	Amorji; Eweshi; Ibabu; Ike-Onicha; Ugillami
Ndokwa West	Utagba Ogbe	322101	Isumpe; Ogbeani; Umusadege; Umusam; Umusedeli; Umuseti
Ndokwa West	Utagbe-Uno	322105	Etua-Uno; Isumpe; Ndemili; Oliogo; Umusadege; Umusedeli; Umuseti; Utagba-Uno
Okpe	Okpe	330101	Abagbrassa; Adagbrasa; Adagbrassa; Ajagolo; Ajaguoyibo; Ajatitor; Aragba; Arunuse; Egbaghe; Egbega-Oviri; Egbeleku; Egborode; Ejemogha; Ekoko; Emadogue; Evwriyan; Gugudu; Ibelefia; Ijakpa; Iriam; Kpokpogri; London Okobia; Obamediare; Odjedi; Ohore; Ojukeoyibo; Oketemowo; Okkwrjeba; Okolovu; Okorhe; Okozi; Okuabude; Okuafe; Okuagbadia; Okuajodo; Okuavwaren; Okuayitu; Okubaire; Okudiemo; Okudiete; Okuegban; Okuekpehre; Okuemoefe; Okuep; Okuetolor; Okuetuvo; Okuevbiarha; Okuevue; Okufuoma; Okughele; Okuigbinoba; Okuirerch; Okuitobore; Okuloho; Okumutakperuo; Okuobonoe-temro; Okuogholo; Okuojuvru; Okuokokor; Okuokotie; Okuokpokper; Okuomude; Okuorokahayon; Okuosia; Okuotono Taire; Okuovwisi; Okuovwori; Okutemwo; Okuyeke; Okwukolo; Okwuvo; Onyeke; Opuraja; Orerokpe; Osubi; Otorighise; Oturu; Oviri Okpe; Oviri-Court; Ovwori; Owugbogbo; Ozebegbughu; Temisa; Ugolo; Unuriuie; Uwagba
Oshimili North	Akwukwu-Igbo	320105	Ajagi; Ogbe-ani; Ogbe-iyase; Ogbeani; Ogbeobi; Origbo; Umuekeke; Umulum; Umuonia; Umuopu
Oshimili North	Ebu/Ukala / Illah	320106	Aganike; Ajaji; Aninwalo; Ekpechor; Iyiaga Oshimili; Machakolo; Ngegwu; Ngene; Ogbe-oji; Ogbeobi; Ogbeolu; Ogbeonaje; Ogo; Okemokrudu; Okenta; Onya; Ugbolu; Ugwuozala; Ukpologwu; Ukwumage; Umuagwu; Umuisizora; Umutei; Umutono; Usebe; Uumuezeze
Oshimili North	Ibusa	320103	Achaiia; Ezukwu; Idumuisagba; Ogbeowe; Ogboli; Umuagwu; Umuehea; Umuekea; Umueze; Umuezeagwu; Umuodafe
Oshimili North	Nsukwa	320109	Abah-Unor; Adonte; Ani-Egbune; Ani-Usi; Azamu; Egbudu-Akah; Nsukwa; Obi Adigwe; Obi Anigala; Obi Chukwuji; Obi Emenem; Obi Isimili; Obi Nti; Obi Okonkwa; Obi Onwordi; Ogidi; Ukwu-Agbonor
Oshimili North	Ogwashi Ukwu	320107	Abodei; Aboh-Ogwashi; Azagba-Ogwashi; Edo-Ogwashi; Isah-Ogwashi; Ogwashi-Uku; Olloh-Ogwashi; Olodu; Otulu-Ogwashi
Oshimili North	Oko-Okwe	320102	Oko-Anala; Okwe
Oshimili North	Okpanam / Ugbolu	320104	Amachia; Obodogwu; Ogbadogba; Ogbe Iyase; Ogbeobi; Ogbeozoma
Oshimili North	Ubulu	320108	Abugba; Aniagbala; Anifekide; Anioma; Ashaba-Ubulu; Ubulu-Edoe; Ubulu-Okiti; Ubulu-Uku; Ubulu-Unor; Udo
Patani	Kabowei	333104	Abari; Koloware; Oporoza; Patani
Patani	Kumboei	333103	Agoloma; Aven; Bolou Apelebiri; Bolou-Angiama; Odoruba; Toru-Angiama; Toru-Apelebiri; Uduophori
Sapele	Elume	331109	Amuokpokpo; Elume; Igbimidaka; Inabome; Jakpa; Ogiedi; Okuoke; Olan; Onoghro; Oyohe
Sapele	Sapele Rural/Amukpe	331107	Adegbarassa; Ajakimonu; Ajamikawa; Amukpe; Amuogodo; Aruowon; Atamua; Ebada; Egbeku; Egborode; Emuaegbedi; Gana; Ikwewu; Ogorode; Okirigwre; Okuovwori; Oton; Sapele
Sapele	Ugborhen	331108	Ekeresan; Okopkooro; Okuodede; Okuovu; Ugbokurusu; Ugborhen
Udu	Udu	330103	Aladja; Asagba; Ayama; Edjophe; Egiegi; Egini; Ekete; Ekorota; Emadadja; Erhieuiohor; Obodo; Obubu; Ogbe-Udu; Oghior; Okolo; Olari; Opete; Orhuwhorun; Ovwodokpokpo; Owhrode; Ovwian, Tareri; Ubogo; Udu; Ugbisi; Ujevwu; Ukperheren; Ukpiovwini; Uvwian
Ughelli North	Agbarha	333106	Agbaide; Agbara-Otor; Aghalokpe; Awirha; Edjeba; Edjekemevor; Edoide; Ehwahwa; Esemagidi; Etefe; Gana; Idjerhe; Ihwredju; Imiroje; Oghara; Ogorode; Okpara; Omakoghwre; Omavovwe; Ophori; Oteri; Otokutu; Owevwe; Saniko; Ujovwre
Ughelli North	Agbarho	333110	Ehwerhe; Ekrerhavwe; Ikweghwu; Iteregbi; Oguname; Ohrerhe; Okan; Okorikpere; Ophori; Orho-Agbarho; Orhokpokpo; Oviri; Ughwughelli; Uvwiama; Uvwiamuge
Ughelli North	Evwreni	333108	Erhurigbedi; Evwreni; Ivwrorode; Iwrorha; Unenurhie
Ughelli North	Ogor	333107	Ejekota; Ogor; Otogor; Oviri; Ovwodokpokpo
Ughelli North	Orogun	333111	Aragba; Eboh; Ekrijezue; Emonu; Erhobaro; Idjerhe; Igbuku; Imodje; Obodeti; Okoh-Idiopha; Onyobru; Orhokpokpo; Orhomuru; Orogun; Otorho-Orogun; Ovara-Umusu; Ovara-Unukpo; Sanubi; Ugono; Uzuaka
Ughelli North	Uwheru	333109	Agadama; Aghanubi; Akabanisi; Avwon; Erhuigbedi; Erhuruwe; Iwre-Egbo; Ogode; Oguname; Ohoror; Ophori-Uwedjor; Ophrororo; Oreba; Owarovwon; Uwheru; Uwriche; Uyode
Ughelli North	Ughelli	333105	Afiesere; Ekiugbo; Ekrejebor; Eruemukobwarien; Iwhrekpokpor; Iwhremaragha; Iwhremaro; Iwhreneneiwhreorie; Ododegho; Odovie; Ofuoma; Ogbovwan; Ohwaro; Oteri; Otovwodo; Uduere; Ughelli; Ujode
Ughelli South	Arhavba-rien	333115	Arhavbarien
Ughelli South	Effurun Otor	333116	Effurun-Otor
Ughelli South	Eghwu	333113	Alagbabiri; Assah; Eghwu; Ekameta; Obaregolo; Ofrukama; Ogoda; Okuama; Olodiama; Omafuvwe; Omosuomo-Inland; Omosuomo-Waterise; Orere; Osusurhie; Otorho-Eghwu; Oyan; Uto-Eghwu
Ughelli South	Okparabe	333114	Irohre-Okpe; Okparabe; Olota
Ughelli South	Olomu	333112	Agbon; Akperhe; Aloba; Ogoname; Ogoni; Okpare; Okpavuerhe; Okpe; Olomu; Ophori; Ophorigbala; Ototere; Oviri; Ovwodokpokpo; Ovwor; Umolo
Ughelli South	Ughiev-wen	333117	Abadiama; Agbaghare; Agbowhiame; Arbagba; Edjophe; Egbo-Ide; Egbo-Uhurie; Ekakpamre; Ekrejegbe; Ekrokpe; Erhuwarien; Esaba; Eyara; Imode; Iwhrekan; Iwhrekreka; Iwhreoku; Obi-Ayagha; Oginibo; Okuemor; Okwagbe-Inland; Okwagbe-Waterside; Ophorigbala; Otegbo; Otititi; Otoedo; Otokutu; Otughievwen; Otutuama; Owahwa; Ugbavwughe; Urhiephron
Ukwuani	Akoku	322114	Akoku-Uno
Ukwuani	Amai	322109	Amai-Nge; Ishikaguma; Umubu; Umuekum; Umuosele
Ukwuani	Ebedei	322113	Adonishaka; Ebedei-Uno; Obi-Ebedei; Umuezogoli
Ukwuani	Eziokpor	322110	Eziokpor-Uno; Obi-Ugbe; Umuoshi
Ukwuani	Ezionum	322107	Ezionum
Ukwuani	Obiarumu	322112	Obiaruku
Ukwuani	Umuebu	322108	Umuebu
Ukwuani	Umukwata	322111	Obinomba; Owah Abbi; Umukwata-Uno
Ukwuani	Umutu	322115	Umutu
Uvwie	Uvwie	330102	Effurun; Ekpan; Enerhen; Jeddo; Okpaka; Okuamowah; Okuireroh; Okwemowa; Okwetata; Okwtata; Opete; Ugbokodo; Ugbolokposo; Ugbomoro; Ugboroke; Ughoton
Warri North	Bennin River	331104	Agogboro; Batere; Deghele; Dudu-Town; Eghoro; Gbokoda; Jakpa; Kolokolo; Ogheye; Oke; Oru-Megege; Tebu; Tisun; Ugbege
Warri North	Oboghoro	331105	Aleima; Bear-Town; Ebrohimi; Egbema; Odububa; Ogbinbirin; Ogbudugbodu; Okoromado; Opuama; Utonlila
Warri North	Koko	331103	Abegborodo; Ajamimogha; Arunologbo; Bresibi; Koko; Nana; Young-Town
Warri South West	Egwa	332105	Egwa
Warri South West	Ugborodo	331106	Aja-Eded; Madangho; Ogidigben; Ubaoke; Ugbo-Egugun; Ugborodo
Warri South	Gbara-Matu	332104	Bekokodia; Okerenghigho; Ubagboro
Warri South	Ode-Itsekiri	332101	Aja-Igba; Egbokodo; Inorin; Jelu; Obodo; Ode-Itsekiri; Orugbo; Ubeji; Ugbodede; Ugbo-Uwangue;

== By electoral ward ==
Below is a list of polling units, including villages and schools, organised by electoral ward.

LGA	Ward	Polling Unit Name
Aniocha North	Obior	Kanidilima P/S - Ishiekpe Quarters; Kanidilima P/S - Ogbe Akwu; Kanidilima P/S - Ogbe Isse; Ukpali P/S - Ogbe Utu Quarters I; Ukpali P/S - Ogbe Utu Quarters II; Ukpali P/S - Idumu Ozei I; Ukpali P/S - Idumu Ozei II; Ofuokwu P/S - Ogbe Agidi I; Ofuokwu P/S - Ogbe Agidi II
Aniocha North	Onicha Ugbo	Gbonoza P/S - Ishiekpe Quarters I; Gbonoza P/S - Ishiekpe Quarters II; Gbonoza P/S - Ishiekpe Quarters III; Aniemeka P/S - Ogbe Kenu Quarters I; Aniemeka P/S - Ogbe Kenu Quarters II; Isioji P/S - Ogbe Kenu I; Isioji P/S - Ogbe Kenu II; Ifeyinwa P/S - Ogbe Obi Quarters I; Ifeyinwa P/S - Ogbe Obi Quarters II
Aniocha North	Obomkpa	Ofunne P/S - Ukpatu Quarters; Ofunne P/S - Ogbe Obi/Ogbe Ezi I; Ofunne P/S - Ogbe Obi/Ogbe Ezi II; Post Office - Ogbe Onei; Anagba P/S - Ogbe Onei; Diei P/S - Usebe/Ogbeze Quarters; Diei P/S - Umuwadia Quarters; Diei P/S - Ogbe Orji Quarters; Ojeokpa P/S - Ugboba I; Ojeokpa P/S - Ugboba II
Aniocha North	Onicha - Olona	Iyiogbe P/S - Ishiekpe Quarters; Iyiogbe P/S - Umuolo Quarters I; Iyiogbe P/S - Umuolo Quarters II; Iyiogbe P/S - Ogbe - Obi Quarters; Ugba P/S - Idumuje Quarters; Ugba P/S - Ogbe Kenu Quarters I; Ugba P/S - Ogbe Kenu Quarters II; Ugba P/S - Agba Quarters
Aniocha North	Issele - Azagba	Azagba P/S - Ikem Quarters; Azagba P/S - Ogbe Akpu; Azagba P/S - Ogbe Utu/Abualo; Osemeka P/S - Ogbe Utu/Abualo I; Osemeka P/S - Ogbe Utu/Abualo II; Enuofu P/S - Idumu Omo/Umuonyimi I; Enuofu P/S - Idumu Omo/Umuonyimi II; Enuofu P/S - Idumu Omo/Umuonyimi III; Enuofu P/S - Ahaba Diei
Aniocha North	Issele Uku I	Egbune P/S - Ogbe-Utu Quarters I; Egbune P/S - Ogbe-Utu Quarters II; Burr P/S - Idumu Ahaba Quarters I; Burr P/S - Idumu Ahaba Quarters II; Burr P/S - Ukpai Quarters; Ogbe Utu P/S - Idumu Inei Quarters; Ogbe Utu P/S - Ogbe Utu Quarters I; Ogbe Utu P/S - Ogbe Utu Quarters II; Ogbe Utu P/S - Ogbeidibo Quarters
Aniocha North	Issele Uku II	Omado P/S - Ogbe Ofu Quarters I; Omado P/S - Ogbe Ofu Quarters II; Omado P/S - Ogbe Ofu Quarters III; Martins P/S - Ogbe-Owele Quarters; Martins P/S - Ogbe-Nti Quarters; Adams P/S - Ishiekpe Quarters I; Adams P/S - Ishiekpe Quarters II; Adams P/S - Ishiekpe Quarters III; Adams P/S - Ogboli Quarters I; Adams P/S - Ogboli Quarters II; Adams P/S - Ogboli Quarters III
Aniocha North	Idumuje - Unor	Ikeke P/S - Idumu Obu Quarters; Mixed Secondary School- Ime Ogbe Quarters; Nkwor I P/S - Okwunye Quarters I; Nkwor I P/S - Okwunye Quarters II; Nkwor II P/S - Ogbeobi/Ogbe Akwu/Atuma Quarters; Nkeze P/S - Atuma Quarters I; Nkeze P/S - Atuma Quarters II; Nkeze P/S - Atuma Quarters III; Ugboko P/S - Ogbe Obi Quarters I; Ugboko P/S - Ogbe Obi Quarters II; Aniugo P/S - Aniofu I; Aniugo P/S - Aniofu II
Aniocha North	Ukwu - Nzu	Eko 'A' P/S - Ogbe Ofu/Inyiogo Quarters I; Eko 'A' P/S - Ogbe Ofu/Inyiogo Quarters II; Eko 'A' P/S - Ogbe Ofu/Inyiogo Quarters III; Eko \B\" P/S - Ogbe Okwe/Agidi Quarters I"""; Eko \B\" P/S - Ogbe Okwe/Agidi Quarters II"""; Ohe P/S - Ugbodu I; Ohe P/S - Ugbodu II; Ohe P/S - Ugbodu III; Azonoba P/S - Ubulubu I; Azonoba P/S - Ubulubu II; Azonoba P/S - Ubulubu III; Ogboi P/S - Ogordor
Aniocha North	Ezi	Paul Emecheta P/S - Umuolo Quarters I; Paul Emecheta P/S - Umuolo Quarters II; Eziuzor P/S - Ogbe Ofu Quarters; Eziuzor P/S - Ogbe Obi Quarters; Eziuzor P/S - Ogbe-Akwu Quarters; Iyienene P/S - Anioma I; Iyienene P/S - Anioma II; Iyienene P/S - Anioma III
Aniocha - South	Ogwashi - Uku Village	Isienugu Primary School, Otulu-Isienugwu/Idumu - Etiti I; Isienugu Primary School, Otulu-Isienugwu/Idumu - Etiti II; Isianwai Primary School, Isianwai/Uzo Edo I; Isianwai Primary School, Isianwai/Uzo Edo II; Abuisi Square, Abuisi; Ollodu Primary School, Ollodu; Omezi Primary School, Olloh; Omezi Primary School, Olloh Camps; Ashinze Primary School, Azagba Ogwashi/Umujea; Azagba Junction Square, Azagba Junction; Edo Village Square, Edo/Edo New Road; Ebiteh Primary School, Isah Ogwashi; Umuokwe Primary School, Aboh Ogwashi
Aniocha - South	Ogwashi - Uku I	Nweze P/S, Umu-Uzu/Umu Ochele; Nweze P/S, Umu- Ochele Isiokwe; Obi - Nzekwu P/S, Umudei; Obi - Nzekwu P/S, Idumu Ogwude; Abuanor P/S, Ogbenti Obi I; Abuanor P/S, Ogbenti Obi II; Abuanor P/S, Ogbenti Obi III; Ogbe-Ubu Hall, Ogbe - Ubu I; Ogbe-Ubu Hall, Ogbe - Ubu II; Ikeleike P/S, Ogbe Ogwudei; Ikeleike P/S, Ishiekpe Quarters; Ikeleike P/S, Ikelike Quarters; Ngwu P/S, Isiokwe Quarters; Ngwu P/S, Umulogal/Idumulubulu; Ngwu P/S, Ogbe Alio I; Ngwu P/S, Ogbe Alio II; Agbodei Camp
Aniocha - South	Ogwashi - Uku II	Onihe P/S, Agidiehe/Idumu Odafe; Onihe P/S, Ogbe-Onihe I; Onihe P/S, Ogbe-Onihe II; Asei P/S, Agidiese I; Asei P/S, Agidiese II; Ogoma P/S, Ogbe-Ihego; Ogoma P/S, Umu-Okwe/Ogbe Onicha; Ogoma P/S, Ogbe Onicha II; Nnabuwa P/S, Ogbe-Ofu I; Nnabuwa P/S, Ogbe-Ofu II; Umu-Onicha/Umu-Olu/Umuobahi; Umu-Neze Hall, Umuokwe I; Umu-Neze Hall, Umuokwe II; Ani-Nshi, Ogbe Ahior/Ogbe Ani; Ani-Nshi, Umu-Okwuni; Ani-Nshi, Asei/Agidiese I; Ani-Nshi, Asei/Agidiese II
Aniocha - South	Ubulu - Uku I	Ogbe-Ani P/S, Onicha-Uku; Ogbe-Ani P/S, Onicha-Uku/Ogbe Ani; Ogbe-Ani P/S, Ani-Okpe Janet I; Ogbe-Ani P/S, Ani-Okpe Janet II; Ijedinka P/S, Aniegbele; Iloakwu P/S, Akwu Quarters I; Iloakwu P/S, Akwu Quarters II; Ishe P/S, Ishe Quarters I; Ishe P/S, Ishe Quarters II; Ishe P/S, Ishe Quarters III; Anioma Square, Anioma Quarters; Abugba Square, Abugba; Akwu Hall, Akwu Quarters; Ubulu P/S, Agbonta I; Ubulu P/S, Agbonta II
Aniocha - South	Ubulu - Uku II	Akpama Village, Akpama/Idumubo; Akpama Village, Idumubo; Idegwu P/S, Ogbege/Udu I; Idegwu P/S, Ogbege/Udu II; Idegwu P/S, Ogbege/Udu III; Abuedo P/S, Osigbudu/Abuado I; Abuedo P/S, Osigbudu/Abuado II; Abuedo P/S, Osigbudu/Abuado III; Abuedo P/S, Osigbudu/Abuado IV; Issele Uku Junction, Osigbudu/Abuedo; Ubulu II P/S, Idumuosuma; Anifekede P/S, Anifekade; Near Village Head Camp, Aniuja; St. Anthony's College, Enugu-Iyi
Aniocha - South	Ubulu - Unor	Aniobodo Primary School, Anioshei/Agbudu I; Aniobodo Primary School, Anioshei/Agbudu II; Aniobodo Primary School, Anioshei/Agbudu III; Etiti Amaka Primary School, Umuate/Ubulu Ugbo I; Etiti Amaka Primary School, Umuate/Ubulu Ugbo II; Etiti Amaka Primary School, Umuate/Ubulu Ugbo III; Etiti Amaka Primary School, Umuate/Ubulu Ugbo IV; Ashaba Ubulu Primary School, Ashaba Ubulu I; Ashaba Ubulu Primary School, Ashaba Ubulu II
Aniocha - South	Nsukwa	Enede I Primary School, Ikokogbe I; Enede I Primary School, Ikokogbe II; Community Hall, Unuoma Quarters; Umalagwu Community Hall, Umalagwu Quarters I; Umalagwu Community Hall, Umalagwu Quarters II; Obi Ezeamaka Primary School, Okenu/Ogbe Onicha I; Obi Ezeamaka Primary School, Okenu/Ogbe Onicha II; Palace Hall, Ikokogbe Quarters; Mill Gate, Jpc Quarters; Quarter Three, Jpc Quarters; Ogidi Primary School, Ogidi; Azamu Primary School, Azamu Nsukwa; Okelie Primary School, Okenu/Ogbu Utu I; Okelie Primary School, Okenu/Ogbu Utu II; Okelie Primary School II, Ashama Waterside
Aniocha - South	Ejeme	Aniogor Primary School, Umujeme I; Aniogor Primary School, Umujeme II; Aniogor Primary School, Umujeme III; Dugbo Primary School, Obi Dugbo; Adofi Primary School, Umuokpale I; Adofi Primary School, Umuokpale II; Illoh Primary School, Ogbe-Obi/Akwu Quarters I; Illoh Primary School, Ogbe-Obi/Akwu Quarters II; Illoh Primary School, Olene Alunelie; Obi Egbudu Primary School, Aniefune
Aniocha - South	Isheagu-Ewulu	Umuomi Primary School, Ogbe Achi/Ogbe Ani/Ose I; Umuomi Primary School, Ogbe Achi/Ogbe Ani/Ose II; Ishe Primary School, Ogbe Ani; Ishe Primary School, Ogbe Achi; Idumu Ele Square, Idumu Ele I; Idumu Ele Square, Idumu Ele II; Mgbalagbe Primary School, Ogbe Etiti/Ogbe -Onishe I; Mgbalagbe Primary School, Ogbe Etiti/Ogbe -Onishe II; Umueze/Umuomah Square, Umueze/Umuomah; Isikiti Primary School, Isikiti/Umuochi I; Isikiti Primary School, Isikiti/Umuochi II; Onuiyi/Atuakpai Square, Onuiyi/Atuakpai
Aniocha - South	Aba - Unor	Anige Primary School, Ikokogbe I; Anige Primary School, Ikokogbe II; Idumu Okete Street, Idumu Okete; Imeani Street, Imeani; Igwe Primary School, Umuogbe; Igwe Primary School, Umuchi; Unu Primary School, Ani Udo; Unu Primary School, Ogbe Uzu; Ulogwe Primary School, Umute I; Ulogwe Primary School, Umute II
Aniocha - South	Ubulu Okiti	Utoli Primary School, Idumu-Utu/Ogbe-Akwu; Abuedo Utu/Ogbe-Akwu; Ashaba Okiti Town Hall, Ashaba Okiti/Idumu Isa; Ezemu Square, Umu-Ute/Ogbetiti/Idumu Ashama; Ashaba Okiti Primary School, Idumu Ozoma/Ogbeabo; Health Centre, Idumu Ogbono/Idumu Ogele/Abuedo Ugbo I; Health Centre, Idumu Ogbono/Idumu Ogele/Abuedo Ugbo II; Okiti Mix. Secondary School, New Road/Ogbe Ofu I; Okiti Mix. Secondary School, New Road/Ogbe Ofu II
Bomadi	Bomadi	Bomadi Overside Bomadi; Owubulou Bomadi Waterside Bomadi; New Quarters Bomadi; Agorodipelei Bomadi; Otoloware Bomadi; Agbe Ware Bomadi; Obrigbene Bomadi; Tamukunudu/Gra Bomadi; Orubiri I Bomadi; Orubiri II Bomadi; Orubiri III Bomadi; Orubiri IV Bomadi
Bomadi	Kpakiama	Mamakebiri/Osuoware Kpakiama; Amadu/Aregha Kpakiama; Agbe Infiware/Ziowei Kpakiama; Okoroware I Kpakiama; Okoroware II Kpakiama; Amalasan/C/Maternity Kpakiama; Singbaleware Kpakiama; West End Kpakiama; Dieware Kpakiama; Oriokoware Kpakiama; Mamakebiri/Osuware Kpakiama
Bomadi	Esanma	Agboze Quarters Agboze Hall Esanma; Deiyaware Deiyaware Hall Esanma; Ezebudumu Ezebudumu Hall Esanma; Enereware Enereware O/S Hall Esanma; Teise Imo Teise Imo Hall I Esanma; Apodu Camp Apodu Camp O/S Hall Esanma; Aliware Aliware Hall Esanma; Eweredumu O/S Esanma; Ekanota O/S Esanma; Diboufio Camp O/S Esanma; Teisemo, Teisemo Hall II Esanma
Bomadi	Ogriagbene	Asoloware/Akpedengha Ogriagbene; Gbodokumor/Okubo O/S Ogriagbene; Otobo Lane O/S Ogriagbene; Amoukorogha O/S Ogriagbene; Okoroware/Febugha O/S Ogriagbene; Gbodokumor/Okubo O/S Ogriagbene I; Gbodokumor/Okubo O/S Ogriagbene II; Gbodokumor/Okubo O/S; Onorun/Okubo/Beinmbou O/S Ogriagbene; Atama 1 & 2 O/S Ogriagbene
Bomadi	Kolafiogbene/Ekametagbene	Elohim City Town Hall; Ayamabiri/Akugbene O/S Kalafiogbene; Eregbene Primary School Kalafiogbene; Oborobiri/Esamabiri O/S Kalafiogbene; Orubiro O/S Ekametagbene; Eyanyanbiri O/S Ekametagbene; Asesabiri O/S Ekametagbene
Bomadi	Ogbeinama/Okoloba	Godday/Manager/Teibowei O/S Ogbeinama; Wordu/Zipamoh/Sientebe O/S Ogbeinama; Ekparon/Kotokiri/Agobo VI O/S Ogbeinama; Orouna/Oburumu/Younbai O/S Ogbeinama; Primary School/Korowei/Nakade O/S Ogbeinama; Agbor Camp O/S Ogbeinama; Aka/Kene/Dasiware/Amabra/Agure, Okoloba
Bomadi	Akugbene I	Warefagha/Agbono Akugbene Grammar School, Akugbene; Forcados/Kporuku Akugbene Grammar School, Akugbene; Ogbogbo/Kolegbene Akugbene Grammar School, Akugbene; Penawou/Koro/Zion Penawou Lane O/S Akugbene; Eserubo/Eyebobomokumo Akugbene Grammar School Akugbene; Ogu/Garry/Oyayei/Feremokumo, Akugbene; Eserubo/Eyebodonghan, Akugbene Grammar School
Bomadi	Akugbene II	Carter/Black Carter Town Hall Akugbene; Dogbo/Angotan, Dogbo Town Hall Akugbene; Luke/Americano, Edon Town Hall Akugbene; Oyayefa/Ebikaboere, Oyayefa Town Hall Akugbene; Enede/Keneke, Odigirima Town Hall Akugbene; Akugbene Town Hall, Akugbene
Bomadi	Akugbene III	Gbe/Odubou/Ajaka, Awobu Primary School, Akugbene; Omoko/Ogofa/Karetimi, Awobu Primary School, Akugbene; Okporon/Orokobou, Awobu Primary School, Akugbene; Gbadiafa/David/Diriware I, Awobu Primary School Akugbene; Coast Boy/Warri, Awobu Primary School Akugbene; Palace/Bakery, Awobu Primary School Akugbene; Ololokeme, Asabaere Hall Akugbene; Eyedoudigha/Agidi, Awobu Primary School, Akugbene; Gbadiafa/David/Diriware II, Awobu Primary School Akugbene
Bomadi	Ogo - Eze	Warebo/Arenu/Ogidi, O/S Ogodobiri; Abiala/Ekpadumu, O/S Ogodobiri; Anuware/Asekpe O/S Ogodobiri; Awiyo/Asegbe O/S Ogodobiri; Abila/Akpadumu II O/S Ogodobiri; Ekparikiri Quarters I O/S Ezebiri; Brofiekumo/Okolomor I O/S Ezebiri; Brofiekumo/Okolomor II O/S Ezebiri; Ekparikiri Quarters O/S Ezebiri; Briofiekumo, New Quarters O/S Ezebiri; Ekparikiri Quarters II O/S Ezebiri
Burutu	Torugbene	Amanadumu I - Government Dispensary; Amanadumu II - Zioke P/G; Koroware I - Primary School, Hall; Koroware II - Omorumo P/G; Koroware III - Tamarau P/G; Koroware IV - Koroware P/G; Azuaware I - Azuaware Rest House; Azuaware II - Ikoroye P/G; Azuaware III - Eserifa P/G; Azuaware IV - Amadiye P/G; Douebiogbo - Douebiogbo P/G; Market - Efefawareowe P/G; Peace Zion - Zion P/G; Akwaware I - Agubelon P/G; Akwaware II - Dedi P/G; Akwaware III - Foukonoup P/G; Akware IV - Foukonou P/G; Akware V & VI - Ororogha P/G; Akware VII - Ororogha P/G; Amanadumu III & IV - Timiyo P/G
Burutu	Tamigbe	Oziarauopomu - Primary School, Hall; Perede - Ton Tonama P/G; Bebetongbolomo - Yankee P/G; Opuware - Fekete P/G; Oziaraware - Nama P/G; Ogulaware - Embre P/G; Okubokpedigha - Primary School, Hall; Ton-Tonama - Tontonama P/G; Doubigbo Zion - Zion P/G; Isreallo - Zion P/G; Foukamogbene -Foukamogbene P/G; Boutamagbene - Boutama P/G; Holy City Zion - Zion P/G
Burutu	Tuomo	Foukunou I - Asu P/G; Foukunou II & III - Primary School, Hall; Ayama Market - Market P/G; Akerebunu I - Egbonware P/G; Akerebunu II - Arerebunu P/G; Akerebunu III - Primary School, Hall P/G; Ekeremobiri I - Ekeremobiri P/G; Ekeremobiri II & III - Primary School, Hall; Akenki/Deware - Akekide P/G; Ogbobagbene I Ebikeme - Primary School, Hall; Ogbobagbene I/Ebikeme - Primary School, Hall; Ogbobagbene /Orubebebiri - Timikoro P/G; Ayama (Ogbobagbene) - Rest House; Trinity Zion - Zion P/G; Kouware - Office P/G; Bolou Tubegbe - Primary School
Burutu	Seimbiri	Ogbumbiri - Zado Hall; Kpupugbene - Kpupugbene P/.G; Ariemo - Egede - Egede P/G; Toborobiri - Toborobiri P/G; Egadeware - Egadeware P/G; Solodiware - Solodiware P/G; Ogeware - Owotorufa P/G; Okineware/Tamukunou - Ayibebi I P/G; Okineware/Tamukunou - Ayibebi II P/G; Kpokpoziware Quarters - I Primary School, Hall; Kpokpoziware Quarters II - Kpopkpoziware P/G; Agbedeware I - Primary School, Hall; Agbedeware II - Agbedeware P/G; Agbedeware III - Alagba P/G; Donoware I - Yoyo P/G; Donoware II - Aliya P/G; Ogusuware - Ogusuware P/G; Arigboware I - Arigboware P/G; Arigboware II/Donoware I - Arigboware; Perebiri Quarters - Owusimowei P/G; Ekpoware I - Primary School, Hall; Ombekeware I - Azuware P/G; Eyoloware - Toro P/G; Ekpoware II - Oyagbarumo P/G; Ombekenare II - Seituru P/G; Ombekenare III - Sunday P/G; Ogusuware I - Primary School, Hall; Ogusuware II - Primary School, Hall; Akpigbene - Akpigbene P/G
Burutu	Ojobo	Sawei I & II - Nissama P/G; Okodizimor - Okidizimor P/G; Oyatiecha - Town Hall; Egede - Apamo P/G; Ogriye I & II Eva Rest House; Ogriye II & III Eva Rest House; Ombutuaebe I - Teitei P/G; Ombutuaebe II - Teitei P/G; Abasuogha - Gbafade P/G; Ofonibidi I - Ofonibidi P/G; Oroupade I - Koloji P/G; Oroupade II - John P/G; Esoko - Zoukumo Primary School; Odozi I - Ekereke P/G; Market Waterside - Market Store; Kpako Store - Kpako P/G; Market Central - Kano P/G; Ofonibio II - Oyere P/G; Diekumogbene - Gbesai P/G; Market Inland - Pidei P/G; Aforesuogbene - Aforesuogbene; Bolou - Ojobo - Town Hall; Tamobiri - Tamabiri P/G; Binatei - Binatei P/G; Sawei III - Sawei P/G; Adokeme - Adokeme P/G
Burutu	Bulou - Ndoro	Bolou-Ndoro - Primary School, Hall; Peregede - Peregede P/G; Tambobiri Quarters - Tamabobiri P/G I; Tambobiri Quarters - Tamabobiri P/G II; Ayama - Alabor P/G; Quazi Quarters - Quazi P/G; Kadula Zion - Zion P/G; Sigede Quarters - Sigede P/G; Laboware/Ekogbene - Esama P/G; Dowei/Okubo - Eva P/G; Market Area - Asobore P/G; Abadiama - Abadiama Primary School; Orugbene Zion - Primary School, Hall; Orugbene Town Hall; Ebiuna - Town Hall; Ebeberegbene - Town Hall; Egrangbene Primary School Hall I; Egrangbene Primary School Hall II
Burutu	Ngbilebiri I	Akubiri I Court Hall; Akubiri II Court Hall; Azibor - Primary School Hall; Diamor - Diamor P/G; Emokpo Qaurters - Agberedu P/G; Assesaghabiri I - Yalabofa P/G; Assesaghabiri II - Yalabofa P/G; Tamokundu - Ayabotu P/G; Boubougbene - Boubougbene P/G; Ozubougbene - Arerebo Hall; Boukongha - Oseimokumo Hall; Gra - Kedikumo Hall; Okokodiagbene - Okokodiagbene P/G; Newtown - Primary School, Hall; Sosegbene - Sosegbene P/G; Ebeingbene - Primary School, Hall; Oyangbene - Ekaye Qaurters P/G; Ogborogbene - Ogborogbene P/G; Omoroware - Esimogbene P/G; Omoroware - Awonu P/G; Ekoro - Ekoro P/G
Burutu	Ngbilebiri II	Funware - Funware P/G; Oyiboba - Oyiboba P/G; Atimagbene - Atimagbene P/G; Matolo - Matolo P/G; Gbale Quarters - Primary School Hall; Kpakabiri - Primary School Hall; Dibeye Quarters I - Dibeye P/G; Dibeye Quarters II - Dibeye P/G; Dibeye Quarters III - Dibeye P/G; Olomie - Olomie P/G; Eyenemugha - Primary School Hall
Burutu	Ogbolubiri	Onglodumu - Primary School Hall; Okuduru - Okuduru P/G; Okofagbene - Okofagbene P/G; Aseyaigbene I - Aseyaigbene P/G; Peredumu - Dene Hall; Oginidumu - Oginidumu P/G; Ogbeinware/Boloware - Primary School; Peredumu - Primary School Hall; Akpor - Town Hall; Ocokpobiri - Primary School Hall; Biubiri - Primary School; Tukpagbene - Tukpagbene P/G I; Tukpagbene - Tukpagbene P/G II; Amabiri - Amabiri P/G I; Amabiri - Amabiri P/G II; Iwreagbado - Iwreagbado P/G
Burutu	Obotebe	Ogbendisi - Okpe Rets House; Ezuebodo - Primary School Hall; Falowei - Falowei P/G; Asenekiri - Asenekiri P/G; School Area - Primary School Hall; Labolouseigha - Labolouseigha P/G; Kenlegbene - Kenlegbene P/G; Okokodiagbene - Okokodiagbene P/G; Okorodudu - Tarabe Primary School Hall; Christian Beach - Court Hall; Aggrey Road/Sor - Old Library I; Aggrey Road/Sor - Old Library II; Soku/Oguleye - Soku P/G; Amba/Ikoyi - Ofou Primary School Hall; Npa Quarters - Cinema Hall; Pudugbene - Primary School Hall; Preboyegbene - Preboye P/G; Stadium Road - Temporary Stadium; Yeye - Primary School Hall; Keremo - Primary School Hall
Burutu	Ogulagha	Market Road/Youbebe - Fesou P/G; Main Town/Keneka - Primary School Hall I; Main Town/Keneka - Primary School Hall II; Shell Quarters - Shell Quarters; Agip - Agip Zone; Okuntu - Primary School Hall; Akereware/Abeghebo - Ogori P/G; Brawei/Abeghebo - Akuna P/G; Fekesi I - Primary School Hall; Fekesi II - Igere P/G; Obotobo I - Primary School Hall; Youkiri - Primary School Hall; Leomoni - Leomoni P/G; Bulou Ama P/G - Bulou Ama P/G; Kalaokugbene - Kalaokugbene P/G; Ifiye - Town Hall; Ibolo I - Primary School Hall; Ibolo II - Primary School Hall; Kafubou - Kafubou P/G; Gbidi Pou - Gbidi Pou P/G; Igogo Amabiyo - Igogo Amabiyo P/G; Kandanghan - Primary School Hall; Okibou Zion - Primary School Hall; Aghoro Zionn - Primary School Hall
Ethiope East	Abraka I	Abraka P. O/Abraka Junction; Abraka P. O/Campus Hall; Abraka P. O/Abraka Model P/S I; Abraka P. O/Abraka Model P/S II; Ekrejeta/Ekrejeta P/S; Abraka P. O/Ascan Hall; Abraka P. O/Avwaeka P/S; Abraka P. O/Abraka G/S; Urhuoka/Urhuoka P/S Hall I; Urhuoka/Oguezi Village; Urhuoka/Urhuoka P/S II; Abraka/Front Of Campus; Abraka/Ogbeji Village
Ethiope East	Abraka II	Abraka Inland/Abraka Inland T/Hall; Abraka Inland/Orhono P/S; Ugono Abraka/Ugono P/S; Ajalomi/Ajalomi Village; Urhuovie/Ogodo P/S Hall I; Erho - Abraka/Erho P/S Hall I; Erho - Abraka/Erho P/S Hall II; Abraka Inland T/Hall/Abraka Inland II; Ugono Abraka/Ugono P/S II
Ethiope East	Abraka III	Oria/Oria P/S I; Oria/Oria P/S II; Oria/Oria P/S III; Oria/Oria T/Hall; Umiaghwa/Umiaghwa P/S I; Umiaghwa/Umiaghwa P/S II; Ughere/Ughere Village; Urhuangbesa/Urhuangbesa P/S; Umeghe/Umeghe P/S I; Umeghe/Umeghe P/S II; Umiaghwa/Umiaghwa P/S; Ughere/Ughere P/S
Ethiope East	Agbon I	Okpara Inland I Okpara T/Hall; Okpara Inland I /Girls P/S I; Okpara Inland I /Girls P/S II; Okpara Inland I /Urhuegbe P/S; Okpara Inland I /Urhuegbe Quarters; Okpara Inland I /Government Market Area; Okpara Inland I /Agbon College Hall; Okpara Inland II/Ejaife P/S Hall; Okpara Inland II/Local Government Dispensary; Okorunoh/Eyakure P/S; Utuyo/Utuyo Village; Imodje/Imodje Village; Ekpagha/Ekpagha P/S; Okurekpo/Okurekpo P/S I; Okurekpo/Okurekpo P/S II; Okurekpo/Onude Quarters I; Okurekpo/Onude Quarters II
Ethiope East	Agbon II	Oviore/Oviorie P/S I; Oviore/Oviorie P/S II; Oviore/Omoise Village; Oviore/Oviorie Post Office; Oviore/Oviorie Secondary School; Ovu Inland/Ovu P/S I; Ovu Inland/Ovu P/S II; Ovu Inland/Ovu P/S III; Urhodo/Urhodo P/S; Urhodo/Onukobale P/S; Ekpan/Ekpan P/S; Ekpan/Ejovovwi P/S; Ovu Inland/Ighene Street, Ovu; Emaka/Emaka Village; Oke/Oke Village; Asoro/Asoro Village
Ethiope East	Agbon III	Kokori I/Oziegbe P/S; Kokori I/Ose Family Hall; Kokori I/Erhojere P/S; Kokori I/Kokori T/Hall; Kokori I/Akpojevwi St. Junction; Kokori I/Ediagbon St. Hall; Kokori I/Ekraka St. Hall; Kokori I/Ediagbon St./Ose Street; Kokori II/Old Post Office; Kokori II/Bolokor Gate; Kokori II/Kokori Girls School; Kokori II/Okpe Street Hall I; Kokori II/Okpe Street Hall II; Kokori II/Primary Health Centre; Kokori II/ Maternity Centre; Kokori II/Kokori G/S; Kokori II/Ogba Street Hall; Erhoike/Erhoike P/S; Okpe/Okpe Village P/S; Erhokori/Erhokori P/S; Anaka/Anaka Waterside
Ethiope East	Agbon IV	Orhoakpor/Orhoakpor Secondary School; Orhoakpor/Ikoro St. Junction; Orhoakpor/Orhoakpor T/Hall; Orhoakpor/Orhoakpor P/S; Orhoakpor/By Market Square; Orhoakpor/Okereka Gate; Orhoakpor/Front Of Sagbodje Comp. Umuruvwu; Orhoakpor/Ogwa Street Junction
Ethiope East	Agbon V	Otumara/Old P/S, Okpara Waterside; Okpara Waterside/Okpara Girls; Okpara Waterside/Erhokpara P/S; Okpara Waterside/Erogwere P/S; Okpara Waterside/Ohwere Girls School; Okorogha/Okurovo/Okorogba P/S; Okorogba/Okurovo/Egbo P/S Okurovo; Okorobi/Okorobi Village; Okodafe/Eregbe P/S I; Okodafe/Eregbe P/S II; Agborhoro/Agborhoro Village; Igun/Ohwoyovwe P/S; Igun/Igun Girls School I; Igun/Igun Maternity Centre; Igun/Igun G/S; Otumara/Otumara Village; Okorori/Okorobi Village; Igun/Igun Girls School II
Ethiope East	Agbon VI	Eku I/Ineweh P/S I; Eku I/Ineweh P/S II; Eku II/Eku T/Hall I; Eku II/Madedon P/S I; Eku II/Aganbi P/S I; Eku II/Eku Girls Secondary School; Eku II/Hospital Qaurters; Eku II/Christ Street; Eku II/Aganbi G/S I; Orhono Eku/Orhono P/S; Echi/Echi P/S; Eku II/Aganbi G/S II; Eku II/Pastors' School; Eku II/Aganbi P/S II; Eku I/Ineweh P/S; Eku II/Eku T/Hall II; Eku II/Eduvie; Eku II/By Market Square; Eku II/Mechanic Village; Eku II/Madedon P/S II; Eku II/Obarungur Quarters Uruhwu
Ethiope East	Agbon VII	Samagidi/Ibruvwe P/S; Urhuokpe/Urhuokpe Village; Egbo/Ekrudu - Egbo; Egbo/Onohuakpor Village; Egbo/Egbo P/S, Egbogho; Egbo/Secondary Community School; Ekraka/Agbude P/S; Erhomeghwu/Emeghwu P/S; Ediagbon/Ediagbon Village; Egbo/Urhushue Village; Urhushue/Egbo Secondary Grammar School; Samagidi/Emeghwu Hall; Egbo/Isiorho Village; Egbo/Ibruvwe Int. Secondary School I
Ethiope East	Agbon VIII	Front Of Oboh's Compound, Isiokolo; Old Police Station, Isiokolo; Agbon Prim. Sch., Isiokolo; Front Of Ejomafuvwe's Compound, Urhuode Qtrs., Isiokolo; Front Of Local Government Council, Isiokolo; Front Of Amagre Gate, Ekrebuo; Front Of Sohwo's Gate Ekrebuo
Ethiope West	Mosogar I	Mosogar I/Primary School Mosogar I; Mosogar II/Primary School Mosogar II; Ajatitor/Ajatitor Town Hall; Benin Road/Maternity Centre; Okuemore Road I/Mosogar Primary School; Okuemore Road II/Mosogar Primary School; Akpobome/Primary School Akpobome; Idjekpokpo/Will Royal International College; Mosogar III/Oguedion Town Hall; Akpobome II/Akpobome Primary School
Ethiope West	Mosogar II	Okuegbapha/Open Space; Evwonogbor I/ Evwonogbor Primary School; Evwonogbor II/ Evwonogbor Primary School; Ugbokpa I Evwonogbor Primary School; Ugbokpa II/ Evwonogbor Primary School; Ugbakele I/Ugbakele Primary School; Ugbakele II/Ugbakele Primary School; Akwodo/Around Baptist Church; Oge Village/Open Space; Akwodo II/Around Baptist Church
Ethiope West	Jesse I	Uduighe Quarters/Maternity; Amagha Street/Idjerhe Primary School; Umuku Road/Erhiekewole Idjerhe Primary School; Uduaka Road/Broad Street Idjerhe Primary School; Oguedion/Ukudejor Road Oguedion Hall; College/L. A. Primary School; Atiwor Road/Ovie Palace; Atiwor Village I/Open Space; Atiwor Village II/Open Space; Okueka I/Open Space; Okuode II/Open Space; Jenesa I/Jenesa Primary School; Jenesa II/Jenesa Primary School; Jenesa III/Jenesa Primary School; Idjeraka/Open Space
Ethiope West	Jesse II	Ajavwini I/Ajavwini Primary School; Ajavwini II/Ajavwini Primary School; Ugbevwei I/Ajavwini Primary School; Ugbevwei II/Ajavwini Primary School; Fregene Quarters/Irhodo Primary School; Aghalokpe Quarters/Irhodo Primary School; Oyibo Quarters/Irhodo Primary School I; Edese I/Edeje Primary School; Okunigho/Emuesiri Primary School; Ekroda/Ejera Primary School; Okuno/Ejera Primary School; Okuogbaye/Ejera Primary School; Okwideniran/Ejera Primary School; Edeje II/Edeje Primary School; Tomianor Quarters/Open Space; Aghalokpe Quarters II/Irhodo Primary School; Oyibo Quarters II/Irhodo Primary School II
Ethiope West	Jesse III	Ovade I/Ovade Primary School; Ovade II/Ovade Primary School; Ugbomoya W. Side/Erhivwohwo Primary School; Ajadoghor Ajikpotor/Erhivwohwo Primary School; Ovwumugu/Erhivwohwo Primary School; Otumara I/Otumara Town; Otumara II/Otumara Town; Okuodibo/Okuodibo Primary School; Ugbomoya Inland I/Oromafuru Primary School; Ugbomoya Inland II/Oromafuru Primary School; Osoguo/Ufuoma Primary School; Edjeketa/Ufuoma Primary School; Okuisoko/Ejekeriada Village; Edjeketa II/Ufuoma Primary School
Ethiope West	Jesse IV	Onyobru Inland I/Onyobru Primary School; Onyobru Inland II/Onyobru Primary School; Onyobru Waterside I/Onyobru Primary School; Onyobru Waterside II/Onyobru Primary School; Udurhodo Quarters I/Oyovwi Primary School; Udurhodo Quarters II/Oyovwi Primary School; Udurhodo Quarters III/Oyovwi Primary School; Uduaka Quarters I/Boboroku Secondary School; Uduaka Quarters II/Boboroku Secondary School; Uduaka Quarters III/Boboroku Secondary School Around Christ Gospel Church; Uduaka Quarters IV/ Around Christ Gospel Church
Ethiope West	Oghara I	Sakpoba Road/Okuephapha/Round Tree/Benin Road Okume Primary School I; Sakpoba Road/Okuephapha/Round Tree/Benin Road Okume Primary School II; Ugbevwe/Okwighere/Okume Primary School; Afrokpe Camp/Afrokpe Comp; Pamol Camp/Pamol Comp; Akon Camp/Omoja Camp Pamol Dispensary; Omonicara/J. Thomas Camp J. Thomas Yard; Ebrifo/Eyerekpokpor/Ebrifo; Okurhie/Okurhie; Ijomi/Ijomi Primary School; Otefe I/Eyerekpokpo Primary School; A. T. P. /Eyerekpokpo Primary School; Ibiughwerin/Market Square; Okuno /Okome Primary School; Edjemoyavwe/Small Market; Otefe II/Market Square; Otefe III/Otefe Primary School; A. T. P. II/Eyerekpokpo Primary School
Ethiope West	Oghara II	Scot/Otorho/Okuemeva Road/Oghara Aja Road/Ogini Grammar School; Scot/Oghara-Aja Road/Uherevie Primary School; Scot/Court/Oghara-Aja Road I Oghara Town Hall; Uherevie Primary School Junior Ethiope West Primary School; Itsekiri Quarters/Oburhie Primary School I; Ajanesan Quarters/Ajanesan Primary School; Rerri Street/Ebiuwheri - Ajanesan Primary School; Uherevie Primary School (Snr) - Uherevie Primary School Snr; Shrimp Quarters/Shrimp Road/Oburhie Primary School; Omoja Quarters I/Oburhie Primary School; Otorho/Ogini Road/Ogini Grammar School; Scot/Court/Oghara-Aja Road III/Oghara T. Hall; Okurho Road/Ufishe Quarters /Around Maranathan Clinic; Omoja Quarters II/Omoja Hall; Omoja Quarters III/Omoja Hall; Itsekiri Quarters II/Oburhire Primary School II
Ethiope West	Oghara III	Ovie Palace/Uherevie Primary School; Community Road/Ovie Saw Mill; Aprra Quarters/Uherevie Primary School; Otubu Quarters/Uherevie Primary School; Ovie Sawmill Road/Sawmill Yard; Igbimi Daka Quarters/Chief Igho's Comp; John Holt Quarters/Uduaka Primary School; Ofotokun Lane/Uduaka Primary School; Oghareki Town Hall /Oghareki T. Hall; Omafuvwe Quarters/Around Mama M. Okotie Compound; Oghareki Town/Oghareki T. Hall; Aprra Quarters II Uherevie P/S (Snr)
Ethiope West	Oghara IV	Mission Street/Udurhie Primary School; Oghara Aja Road/Chief Onokode's Compound; Opuoru Lane/Salt Mill Quarters/Oghareki Grammar School; Community Road/Oghareki Grammar School; Arapa Street I /Udurhie Primary School; Oghara Aja Road/Oghareki Grammar School; Mill Camp/Club House; Clerk Quarters/Club House; New Building/Club House; Urhobo Quarters I/Ajabodudu Primary School; Urhobo Quarters II/Ajabodudu Primary School; Urhobo Quarters III/Ajabodudu Primary School; Ugbeku/Ugbeku Primary School; Ugbenu/Ekuomagbe Primary School; Arakpa Street II/Udurhie Primary School; Ugbenu II/Ekuomagbe Primary School
Ethiope West	Oghara V	Otumara/Okumenu Primary School; Adegboyerin I/Okumenu Primary School; Obromudu/Otumara Primary School; Ovade/Okuhevie Quarters/Onogborhe Primary School; Okurode/Adjeketa Quarters I/Onogborhe Primary School; New Site/Onogbohe Primary School; Onoghovo/Chief Oko's Compound; Pan Ocean Camp/Ugbevwe/-Ekuomagba Primary School; Adegboyerin II/Okumemu Primary School; Okurode/Adjeketa II/Onogborhe Primary School; Okumenu Primary School, Otumara II
Ika North- East	Owa I	Obaigbena Primary School, Owa -Oyibu I; Obaigbena Primary School, Owa -Oyibu II; Obaigbena Primary School, Owa -Oyibu III; Court Hall, Owa - Oyibu I; Court Hall, Owa - Oyibu II; Court Hall, Owa - Oyibu III; Court Hall, Owa - Oyibu IV; Obisi Primary School, Owa - Oyibu I; Obisi Primary School, Owa - Oyibu II; Obisi Primary School, Owa - Oyibu III; Rall -Way Camp, Owa - Oyibu; Isibor Primary School, Owa - Alidinma
Ika North- East	Owa II	Eghoma Primary School, Owa - Alero I; Eghoma Primary School, Owa - Alero II; Eghoma Primary School, Owa - Alero III; Eghoma Primary School, Owa - Alero IV; Eghoma Primary School, Owa - Alero V; Ugbekile Hall, Owa-Alero I; Ugbekile Hall, Owa-Alero II; Egwe Primary School, Owa - Alero I; Egwe Primary School, Owa - Alero II; Egwe Primary School, Owa - Alero III; Iroro Primary School, Owa - Alero I; Iroro Primary School, Owa - Alero II; Iroro Primary School, Owa - Alero III; Iroro Primary School, Owa - Alero IV
Ika North- East	Owa III	Alasi Primary School, Boji - Boji, Owa I; Alasi Primary School, Boji - Boji, Owa II; Alasi Primary School, Boji - Boji, Owa III; Alasi Primary School, Boji - Boji, Owa IV; Mary Mount College, Boji-Boji, Owa I; Mary Mount College, Boji-Boji, Owa II; Mary Mount College, Boji-Boji, Owa III; Ute - Okpu Hall, Boji-Boji, Owa; Owanta Land Office, Boji-Boji, Owa I; Owanta Land Office, Boji-Boji, Owa II; Owanta Land Office, Boji-Boj, I Owa III; Owanta Land Office, Boji-Boji, Owa IV
Ika North- East	Owa IV	Ngala Primary School, Boji - Boji Owa I; Ngala Primary School, Boji - Boji Owa II; Ngala Primary School, Boji - Boji Owa III; Ngala Primary School, Boji - Boji Owa IV; Ngala Primary School, Boji - Boji Owa V; Okundaye Primary School, Boji - Boji Owa I; Okundaye Primary School, Boji - Boji Owa II; Okundaye Primary School, Boji - Boji Owa III; Okundaye Primary School, Boji - Boji Owa IV; Okundaye Primary School, Boji - Boji Owa V
Ika North- East	Owa V	Iyi - Aghulor Primary School, Owanta I; Iyi - Aghulor Primary School, Owanta II; Iyi - Aghulor Primary School, Owanta III; Osimi Primary School, Owanta Alosimi I; Osimi Primary School, Owanta Alosimi II; Osimi Primary School, Owanta Alosimi III; Osimi Primary School, Owanta Alosimi IV
Ika North- East	Owa VI	Adagba Primary School, Owa - Ofie I; Adagba Primary School, Owa - Ofie II; Ozomor Primary School, Alizomor I; Ozomor Primary School, Alizomor II; Ozomor Primary School, Alizomor III; Ozomor Primary School, Alizomor IV; Ozomor Town Hall, Alizomor; Owa-Ekei Primary School, Owa - Ekei I; Owa-Ekei Primary School, Owa - Ekei II
Ika North- East	Akumazi	Umuocha Primary School, Akumazi I; Umuocha Primary School, Akumazi II; Umuocha Primary School, Akumazi III; Akuma Primary School, Akumazi I; Akuma Primary School, Akumazi II; Usenu Primary School, Owerre - Olubor I; Usenu Primary School, Owerre - Olubor II; Diagbo Primary School Owerre-Olubor I; Diagbo Primary School Owerre-Olubor II; Court Hall, Owerre - Olubor; Amufa Primary School, Ekuoma I; Amufa Primary School, Ekuoma II; Community Hall, Ekuoma I; Community Hall, Ekuoma II
Ika North- East	Igbodo	Ilabor Primary School, Igbodo I; Ilabor Primary School, Igbodo II; Ilabor Primary School, Igbodo III; Ilabor Primary School, Igbodo IV; Ozei Primary School, Igbodo I; Ozei Primary School, Igbodo II; Ozei Primary School, Igbodo III; Ukpekwu Primary School, Igbodo I; Ukpekwu Primary School, Igbodo II; Ukpekwu Primary School, Igbodo III; Health Centre, Igbodo I; Health Centre, Igbodo II; Health Centre, Igbodo III; Health Centre, Igbodo IV; Isaiah Camp, Igbodo
Ika North- East	Ute - Okpu	Ekpu Primary School, Ute - Okpu I; Ekpu Primary School, Ute - Okpu II; Ekpu Primary School, Ute - Okpu III; Ekpu Primary School, Ute - Okpu IV; Aghaulor Primary School, Ute - Okpu I; Aghaulor Primary School, Ute - Okpu II; Aghaulor Primary School, Ute - Okpu III; Aghaulor Primary School, Ute - Okpu IV; Aghaulor Primary School, Ute - Okpu V; Alohen Primary School, Ute-Okpu I; Alohen Primary School, Ute-Okpu II; Erumu Primary School, Ute-Erumu I; Erumu Primary School, Ute-Erumu II; Erumu Primary School, Ute-Erumu III; Ute-Enugu Primary School, Ute-Enugu
Ika North- East	Idumuesah	Ogbeno Primary School, Idumuesah I; Ogbeno Primary School, Idumuesah II; Ogbeno Primary School, Idumuesah III; Ibili Primary School, Idumuesah I; Ibili Primary School, Idumuesah II; Ibili Primary School, Idumuesah III; Community Hall, Idumuesah I; Community Hall, Idumuesah II
Ika North- East	Umunede	Ogbe Model Primary School, Umunede I; Ogbe Model Primary School, Umunede II; Ogbe Model Primary School, Umunede III; Ijehon Primary School, Umunede I; Ijehon Primary School, Umunede II; Ijehon Primary School, Umunede III; Ijehon Primary School, Umunede IV; Diai Primary School, Umunede; Iyei Primary School, Umunede I; Iyei Primary School, Umunede II; Onyeagwu Primary School, Umunede; Court Hall, Umunede I; Court Hall, Umunede II; Court Hall, Umunede III; New Lagos/Asaba Road, Umunede I; New Lagos/Asaba Road, Umunede II; New Lagos/Asaba Road, Umunede III
Ika North- East	Mbiri	Aren Primary School, Mbiri I; Aren Primary School, Mbiri II; Aren Primary School, Mbiri III; Aren Primary School, Mbiri IV; Okei Primary School, Mbiri I; Okei Primary School, Mbiri II; Okei Primary School, Mbiri III; Otugbo Primary School, Mbiri I; Otugbo Primary School, Mbiri II
Ika North- East	Ute - Ogbeje	Ogbeje Primary School, Ute-Ogbeje I; Ogbeje Primary School, Ute-Ogbeje II; Ogbeje Primary School, Ute-Ogbeje III; Igwebuike Primary School, Ute-Ogbeje I; Igwebuike Primary School, Ute-Ogbeje II; Igwebuike Primary School, Ute-Ogbeje III; Town Hall, Ani-Nwachokor
Ika North- East	Otolokpo	Azagba Primary School, Otolokpo I; Azagba Primary School, Otolokpo II; Okete Town Hall, Otolokpo I; Okete Town Hall, Otolokpo II; Umuhu Quarters, Otolokpo; L. A. Primary School, Otolokpo I; L. A. Primary School, Otolokpo II
Ika - South	Agbor Town I	Ogbesogban Hall/Agbor - Obi I; Obi - Ikechukwu Road/Obika St. Agbor - Obi I; Obi - Ikechukwu Road/Obika St. Agbor - Obi II; Obika Primary School/Agbor Obi I; Obika Primary School/Agbor Obi II; Old Court Premises/Agbor Obi I; Obi - Ikechukwu Road/Iregwa St/Agbor Obi I
Ika - South	Agbor Town II	Orikeze Avenue Junction/ Agbor Obi II; Gbenoba Grammar School/Agbor Obi II; Nosieri Primary School/Agbor - Obi II; Obi-Olihe Hall/Agbor - Obi II; Ihogbe Hall/Agbor - Obi II
Ika - South	Ihuozomor (Ozanogogo Alisimie)	Omumu Town Hall/Oza-Nogogo/Alisimie; Alizomor Primary School/Oza-Nogogo/Alisimie; Alisor/Alileha Primary School/Oza-Nogogo/Alisimie; Eno Primary School/Oza-Nogogo/Alisimie; Iduneha Primary School/Oza-Nogogo/Alisimie; Uvbe Hall/Oza-Nogogo/Alisimie; Owuwu Primary School/Oza-Nogogo/Alisimie; Alibido Primary School/Oza-Nogogo/Alisimie; Idumunenwa Primary School/Oza-Nogogo Alisimie; Idumukwu Primary School/Oza-Nogogo Alisimie I; Idumukwu Primary School/Oza-Nogogo Alisimie II; Aliogor Primary School/Oza-Nogogo/Alisimie; Ehiwuogwu Primary School/Oza-Nogogo/Alisimie I; Ehiwuogwu Primary School/Oza-Nogogo/Alisimie II; Isimie Primary School/Oza-Nogogo/Alisimie
Ika - South	Ihiuiyase I	Alifekede Primary School, Ihu - Iyase I; Alifekede Primary School, Ihu - Iyase II; Uweifo Primary School, Ihu - Iyase I; Uweifo Primary School, Ihu - Iyase II; Alihagwu Primary School, Ihu - Iyase I; Alihagwu Primary School, Ihu - Iyase II; Amahia Oki Town Hall, Ihu - Iyase I; Idumuoza Primary School, Ihu - Iyase I; Idumu-Aze Town Hall, Ihu - Iyase I; Idumu-Aze Town Hall, Ihu - Iyase II
Ika - South	Ekuku - Agbor	Omie Primary School, Ekuku - Agbor I; Omie Primary School, Ekuku - Agbor II; Omie Primary School, Ekuku - Agbor III; Omie Primary School, Ekuku - Agbor IV; Old Court Hall, Ekuku - Agbor I; Old Court Hall, Ekuku - Agbor II; Old Court Hall, Ekuku - Agbor III; Omu-Izehen Primary School, Ekuku Agbor I; Omu-Izehen Primary School, Ekuku Agbor II; Alakada Primary School, Ekuku - Agbor; Iduhor Primary School, Ekuku - Agbor; Umu Primary School, Ekuku - Agbor I; Umu Primary School, Ekuku - Agbor II
Ika - South	Ihuiyase II	Alihame Town Hall, Ihu - Iyase II I; Alihame Town Hall, Ihu - Iyase II II; Aliokpu Primary School, Ihu - Iyase II; Aliokpu Town Hall, Ihu - Iyase II; Aliagwai Primary School, Ihu - Iyase II; Agbornta Town Hall, Ihu - Iyase II I; Agbornta Town Hall, Ihu - Iyase II II; Oki II Town Hall, Ihu - Iyase II I; Oki II Town Hall, Ihu - Iyase II II; Oki II Primary School, Ihu - Iyase II; Baptist Girls High School, Ihu - Iyase II; Oki Afia - Ugboh Market, Ihu - Iyase II
Ika - South	Boji - Boji I	Ika National Hall, Boji-Boji I; Orogodo Primary School, Boji - Boji I - I; Orogodo Primary School, Boji - Boji I - II; Orogodo Primary School, Boji - Boji I - III; Orogodo Primary School, Boji - Boji I - IV; Charles Burr Primary School, Boji - Boji I - I; Charles Burr Primary School, Boji - Boji I - II; Charles Burr Primary School, Boji - Boji I - III; Charles Burr Primary School, Boji - Boji I - IV; Charles Burr Primary School, Boji - Boji I - V; Uromi/Auchi Motor Park, Boji - Boji I; Agbor Tech College, Boji - Boji I
Ika - South	Boji - Boji II	Ekuku - Agbor Motor Park, Boji-Boji II - I; Ekuku - Agbor Motor Park, Boji-Boji II - II; Ekuku - Agbor Motor Park, Boji-Boji II - III; Odili Primary School, Boji-Boji II - I; Odili Primary School, Boji-Boji II - II; Igumbor Otiku Primary School, Boji-Boji II -I; Igumbor Otiku Primary School, Boji-Boji II - II; Igumbor Otiku Primary School, Boji-Boji II; Alisimie Hall, Boji-Boji II - I; Alisimie Hall, Boji-Boji II - II; Alisimie Hall, Boji-Boji II - III; Alisimie Hall, Boji-Boji II - IV
Ika - South	Boji - Boji III	Agbor Model Primary School, Boji - Boji III - I; Agbor Model Primary School, Boji - Boji III - II; Charles/Imudia Street, Boji - Boji III; Ct. C. Market, Boji - Boji III; Eni Primary School, Boji - Boji III - I; Eni Primary School, Boji - Boji III - II; Itamaze Primary School, Boji - Boji III - I; Itamaze Primary School, Boji - Boji III - II
Ika - South	Abavo I	Oyoko Primary School, Oyoko/Ayima I; Oyoko Primary School, Oyoko/Ayima II; Oyoko Town Hall, Oyoko/Ayima; Azuowa Primary School, Oyoko/Ayima I; Azuowa Primary School, Oyoko/Ayima II; Azuowa Town Hall, Oyoko/Ayima; Anyima Primary School, Oyoko/Ayima I; Anyima Primary School, Oyoko/Ayima II; Anyima Primary School, Oyoko/Ayima III
Ika - South	Abavo II	Old Court Hall, Abavo II - I; Idumugbo Community Hall, Abavo II; Osaigbobu Primary School, Abavo II - I; Osaigbobu Primary School, Abavo II - II; Drivers Union Hall, Abavo II; Igbogili Primary School, Abavo II - I; Igbogili Primary School, Abavo II - II; Igbogili Primary School, Abavo II - III; Ogbesogban Hall, Abavo II - I; Ogbesogban Hall, Abavo II - II
Ika - South	Abavo III	Ekuoma Primary School, Abavo III - I; Ekuoma Primary School, Abavo III - II; Ekuoma Primary School, Abavo III - III; Nkwor Primary School, Abavo III - I; Nkwor Primary School, Abavo III - II; Ekwuma Primary School, Abavo III - I; Ekwuma Primary School, Abavo III - II; Alizomor Community Hall, Abavo III - I; Alizomor Community Hall, Abavo III - II; Alizomor Community Hall, Abavo III - III
Isoko North	Iyede I	Ekrovie Primary School, Uruthatho, Otor - Iyede; Ekreme Hall, Ekreme, Otor - Iyede; Iyede Town Hall, Uruosu, Otor - Iyede; Uruowhe Hall, Uruowhe, Otor - Iyede; Ulli Primary School, Ulli-Iyede; Oghenerurhie Primary School, Oghenerurie I; Owisike Street, Oghenerurhie II; Ewhisigba Village, Ewhisigba; Alagba Village, Alagba; Iwride Hall, Iwride; Ovie Hall, Urunogbo, Otor - Iyede; Uruene Hall, Uruene, Otor - Iyede
Isoko North	Iyede II	Atebo Comprehensive High School, Ekiugbo - Iyede; Okpaigie Hall, Okpaigie; Atebo Primary School, Oghara - Iyede; Imo Primary School, Oteri - Iyede; Opre Primary School, Ebor - Iyede; Ija Hall, Ogewho - Iyede; Market Square, Ekiugbo Iyede; Ikpokpogri Hall, Oghara Iyede
Isoko North	Ellu/Radheo/Ovrode	Akaluba Hall, Akaluba/Ovie/Okpara, Ellu; Town Hall, Otekpo, Ellu; Eps Ellu, Okpara/Osa/Urume/Otekpo, Ellu; Eps Ellu, Osa/Uruen I/Emeta, Ellu; Osa Hall, Osa/Uruen I/Emeta, Ellu; Idoni Hall, Idoni Village; Aradhe Town Hall, Aradhe; Aradhe Town Hall, Akreke Street, Aradhe; Edegbu Hall, Edegbu Quarters, Aradhe; Ovrode Town Hall, Evro/Ogu Street, Ovrode; Eps Ovrode, Owhe/Okpa Street, Ovrode I; Eps Ovrode, Owhe/Okpa Street, Ovrode II; Ovrode Town Hall, Ovrode Town; Eps Ovrode, Useh/Odhegu, Ovrode
Isoko North	Ofagbe	Oriovo Primary School, Orogun/Uruonwa, Ofagbe I; Oriovo Primary School, Orogun/Uruonwa, Ofagbe II; Egwe Village, Egbahe/Egwe; Okore Street, Okore, Ofagbe I; Okore Street, Okore, Ofagbe II; Orie Street, Orie/Irala Village; Otibio Street, Otibio, Ofagbe; Etevie Street, Etevie/Ototie, Ofagbe; Iyode Street, Iyode, Ofagbe; Ofatech, Omoha, Ofagbe; College Road, Ogwo Village/College Road, Ofagbe
Isoko North	Iluelogbo	Okotie's House Igbuku; Town Hall, Uriugo, Iluelogbo; Iluelogbo Grammar School, Iluelogbo; Ashiaka Junction, Ekrosue I, Iluelogbo; Ekiotor, Ekrosue II, Iluelogbo; Ogboru's Compound, Ekrosue III, Iluelogbo; Main Market, Iluelogbo; Orhokpokpo Primary School, Iluelogbo; Post Office, Uruowa/ Ekresabor, Iluelogbo; Ughegbe's Junction, Omia, Iluelogbo; Inyedhe Hall, Inyedhe, Iluelogbo
Isoko North	Owhe/Akiehwe	Aluogua Street, Otor - Owhe; Uruede/ Ekiohebi Street, Otor - Owhe; Enuru/ Ekikesi Street, Otor - Owhe; Ekreze Street, Otor-Owhe; Onomiwo/ Uruorie Street, Otor-Owhe; Uruede Hall, Otor-Owhe; Okwe/ Owhotoro Road, Otor-Owhe; Ihobe/Otwoho St., Otor-Owhe; Opreh Street, Akiewhe; Alua Street, Akiewhe; Olaha Street, Akiewhe; Ekpuze/ Okpokpor Street, Akiewhe; Imibo/ Ihobe Street, Akiewhe; Edhomoko Primary School, Edhomoko; Canaan Village, Canaan
Isoko North	Emevor	Emewha Primary School, Emevor; Odion Primary School, Emevor; Ehehwa Primary School Uruofe Quarters, Emevor; Odion Primary School Enuru Quarters, Emevor; Isi Primary School Ivrogbo, Ivrogbo Village; Egbahe Village Hall, Egbahe Village; Ujewe Hall, Ujewe; Oghre Hall, Oghre Rhe; Ofagbe Hall, Ofagbe Village; Palma Hall, Edheke/Edusi, Emevor I; Palma Hall, Edheke/Edusi, Emevor II
Isoko North	Okpe - Isoko	Okpe Town Hall, Okpe Isoko; Okabara Primary School, Okpe Isoko; Women Town Hall, Okpe Isoko I; Women Town Hall, Okpe Isoko II; Eziro Village, Okpe Isoko; Ige Primary School, Ige; Itebiege, Open Space, Itebiege I; Itebiege, Open Space, Itebiege II
Isoko North	Ozoro I	Otuloho Hall, Otuloho Street, Ozoro I; Otuloho Hall, Otuloho Street, Ozoro II; Enuru St. Enuru St., Ozoro I; Enuru St. Enuru St., Ozoro II; Uruto Hall, Iyesaborie/Iyerabe, Ozoro; Uruto Hall, Iyegbo/Adokpe Street, Ozoro; Iyeosa St, Ozoro; Iyekpagba Hall, Iyekpagba Street, Ozoro; Egare Street, N. D. C Road, Ozoro I; Egare Street, N. D. C Road, Ozoro II; Egware Primary School, Iyegbe Ekreru/Ubiogo, Ozoro; Inaghogho St, Inaghogho St., Ozoro I; Inaghogho St, Inaghogho St., Ozoro II
Isoko North	Ozoro II	Olordo Gps, Erovie, Ozoro; Okeke Street, Ozoro; Ofakpo Street, Ozoro; Ofa/Idheze Road, Erovie, Ozoro; Mission Road Erovie, Ozoro; Ototie, Etevie, Ozoro; Iyegbo Street, Etevie, Ozoro; Ososo Street, Etevie, Ozoro I; Ososo Street, Etevie, Ozoro II; Iyethoto, Etevie, Ozoro; Egbo St, Etevie, Ozoro I; Egbo St, Etevie, Ozoro II; Okpalle Village, Etevie, Ozoro
Isoko North	Ozoro III	No., 60 Iyevori Street, Urude, Ozoro; Jollyman Shade, Urude, Ozoro; No. 9 Iyeriri Street, Urude, Ozoro; Ozadhe Street, Urude, Ozoro; Ogbaide Street, Urude, Ozoro; Iyeokra Street, Urude, Ozoro; Ororo House, Urude, Ozoro; No. 18 Opre Street, Oruamudhu, Ozoro; Ofah Hall Oruamudhu, Ozoro; Iyegeluru Street Oruamudhu, Ozoro; Egbururie Primary School Oruamudhu, Ozoro; Ugbuluhu Street, Oruamudhu, Ozoro
Isoko North	Oyede	Odiologho Hall, Oyede; Ofagbe Hall, Oyede I; Ikruvuhe Hall, Oyede; Okro Hall, Oyede; Oyede Towh Hall, Oyede; Bethel Towh Hall, Oyede; Enuto Hall, Oyede I; Enuto Hall, Oyede II; Ofagbe Town Hall II, Oyede
Isoko North	Otibio	Otibio Grammar School, Otibio; Ogu Primary School, Otibio I; Ogu Primary School, Otibio II; Market Square, Erawha; Town Hall, Otie; Town Hall, Eniagbedhi; Aziaro Hall, Aziaro
Isoko South	Oleh I	Origho, Primary School, Emosonye/Olecha/Amiere; Council Pavilion, Uzokpa/Atawhe Quarters; Odoro Primary School, Uzokpa/Atawhe Quarters I; Odoro Primary School, Uzokpa/Atawhe Quarters II; Odoro Primary School, Uzokpa/Atawhe Quarters III; Egide Hall, Uzokpa/Atawhe Quarters; Amede Hall, Uzokpa/Atawhe Quarters; Oghae Hall, Uzokpa/Atawhe Quarters; Edho Hall, Uzokpa/Atawhe Quarters; Eru Hall, Uzokpa/Atawhe Quarters; Uwe Hall, Uzokpa/Atawhe Quarters; Oloro Hall, Uzokpa/Atawhe Quarters; Urusewe Hall, Eviewho Quarters I; Urusewe Hall, Eviewho Quarters II; Otah Hall, Uzokpa/Atawhe Quarters; Old Motor Park, Eviewho Quarters/I. D. C. Rd I; Old Motor Park, Eviewho Quarters/I. D. C. Rd II; Owhara Primary School, Eviewho Quarters; Odugala Street, Eviewho Quarters, I. D. C. Rd
Isoko South	Oleh II	Ebrebru Hall, Ebrebru/Egelunu Street; Okpohro Hall, Okpohro Quarters I; Okpohro Hall, Okpohro Quarters II; Amawa Hall, Amawa; Otokwe Street, Otokwe; Ekroge Hall, Ukolobi Quarters; Uruero Hall, Ukolobi Quarters I; Uruero Hall, Ukolobi Quarters II; I. C. S. Oleh, Enuru Quarters I; I. C. S. Oleh, Enuru Quarters II; I. C. S. Oleh, Enuru Quarters III; Daily Market, Daily Market; Edhubi Street, Edhubi; R. E. B. Station, Ukolobi Quarters; Emore Grammar School, Ahame/Old Emede Road; Aruahor Street, Aruahor/Olomoro Road; Pentecostal Church Junction, Olezi Street; Ekrigbenu Street, Ukolobi Quarters
Isoko South	Aviara	Otuloho Hall, Otuloho/Iyovie Quarters I; Otuloho Hall, Otuloho/Iyovie Quarters II; Iyovie Hall, Otuloho/Iyovie Quarters; Otor Aviara Primary School, Otuloho/Iyovie Quarters; Otor Aviara Town Hall, Otuloho/Iyovie Quarters; Eruogba Hall, Eruogba/Iyefiho; Iyefiho Hall, Eruogba/Iyefiho; Owawonya Primary School, Araya I; Owawonya Primary School, Araya II; Abawa Primary School, Aberuo; Okpare Village Hall, Okpare Village; Otoka Village Hall, Otoka; Abiogu Primary School, Ewhokpaka I; Abiogu Primary School, Ewhokpaka II; Okpawa Hall, Okpawa Village; Ikpa Hall, Ikpa Village; Ezetoro Primary School, Edherie; Aka Primary School, Ukpude; Ughelli Aviara Town Hall, Ughelli Village; Ovu Square, Otuloho; Iyovie Hall, Iyovie Quarters II; Anubeze Square, Iyovie; Kano Square, Eruougba; Oghara Square, Iyefiho; Otuwoma Primary School, Ewhokpaka; Owawonya Primary School, Araya III; Iyovie Hall, Iyovie Quarters III
Isoko South	Uzere	Uweye Quarters, Urukere/Otegeloma; Araya Hall, Urukere/Otegeloma; Enye Hall, Urukere/Otegeloma; Uruse Hall, Urukere/Otegeloma; Obughe Hall (II), Uheri; Afikiokor Eni Primary School, Uweye; Agbaza Hall, Uheri; Obughe Hall (I), Uheri; Ukise Hall, Uheri; Uzere Primary School, Uheri; Uruehe Hall, Ezede; Abo-Ezede Hall, Ezede; Eteri Hall, Ezede; Paris Street, Ezede; Ekrigbesi Hall, Ekrigbesi Village; Uruede Hall, Ezede; Abale Square, Abale Village; Iboro Square, Iboro; Community Town Hall, Uruafiki/Otibiere; Iwre - Ezede Hall, Iwre - Ezede; Obughe Hall II, Uheri
Isoko South	Emede	Uruoho Hall, Enuto Quarters I; Odhe Hall, Enuto Quarters; Oruokphro Hall, Okpohro/Adaza/Etevie I; Oruokphro Hall, Okpohro/Adaza/Etevie II; Uruaka Hall, Okpohro/Adaza/Etevie; Eweri Primary School, Okpohro/Adaza/Etevie; Etevie Hall, Okpohro/Adaza/Etevie; Okromoro Hall, Uruaka, Okromoro; Okpakpaje Hall, Uruaka, Okromoro; Eweokpe Hall, Uruaka, Okromoro; Uri Jaka Hall, Uruaka, Okromoro; Enuto/Ikoyi Hall, Enuto Quarters; Uruoho Hall, Enuto Quarters II
Isoko South	Olomoro	Ekrewolowo Hall, Uruabe Quarters; Olomoro Primary School, Uruabe Quarters; Eteso Hall, Ukoli Quarters I; Eviewho Hall, Ukoli Quarters; Enuru Hall, Ukoli Quarters; Uruwhoru Hall, Egbo Quarters; Ekretu Hall, Egbo Quarters; Akokotu Hall, Egbo Quarters; Ikiagbodo Hall, Ikiagbodo, Iviri, Iwride; Oviri Village Hall, Oviri Village; Iwride Village Hall, Iwride Village; Okpe Village Hall, Okpe Village; Eteso Hall, Ukoli Quarters II
Isoko South	Igbide	Amadhe Hall, Owodokpokpo; Uruovo Hall, Owodokpokpo; Uvrudu Hall, Owodokpokpo; Urie Primary School, Owodokpokpo; Ureiki Hall, Owodokpokpo; Oteri Hall, Oteri - Igbide I; Oteri Hall, Oteri - Igbide II; Egbo Primary School, Oteri - Igbide; Iloge Hall, Oteri - Igbide; Okpohro Hall, Okpohro Quarters; Otibio Hall, Okpohro Quarters; T. D. B. Hall, Okpohro Quarters; Eru Primary School, Okpohro Quarters; Ubrenye Hall, Ubrenye Quarters I; Ekremeruo Hall, Uruwhre Quarters; Uruwhre Hall, Uruwhre Quarters; Ubini/Atta - Igbide Grammar School Uruwhre; Urueyae Hall, Uruwhre; Ubrenye Hall, Ubrenye Quarters II
Isoko South	Erowa/Umeh	Uruope Quarters, Erohwa; Eruove Quarters, Erohwa; Ekukeni Quarters, Erohwa; Igbobie Primary School, Erohwa I; Umeh Primary School, Umeh I; Umeh Primary School, Umeh II; Umeh Grammar School, Umeh III; Umeh Grammar School, Umeh IV; Umeh Quarters, Erohwa
Isoko South	Enhwe/Okpolo	Eyara Hall, Eyara, Ulewe, Emaka Quarters; Utoho Hall, Eyara, Ulewe, Emaka Quarters; Ulewe Hall, Ulewe Quarters; Emaka Hall, Emaka Quarters I; Okpolo Primary School, Eyara, Ulewe, Emaka I; Okpolo Primary School, Eyara, Ulewe, Emaka II; Edi Hall, Olade, Etevie Quarters; Uruole Hall, Olade, Etevie Quarters; Oviota Primary School, Olade, Etevie Quarters I; Oviota Primary School, Olade, Etevie Quarters II; Ekrovie Hall, Ekrovie/Ukurede; Uyarawa Hall, Ekrovie/Ukurede; Emaka Hall, Emaka Quarters II
Isoko South	Irri I	Ezo Hall, Okogho; Itimi Primary School, Enuru; Edhukwe Hall, Edhukwe; Onyaruwe Hall, Okogho; Eviewho Hall, Eviewho; Irri Town Hall, Eviewho; Inyekpokpo Quarters, Eviewho; Omo-Ode Primary School, Eviewho/Okpara; Okpara Hall, Eviewho/Okpara; Otibio St. Okpara; Okpara Hall (II), Okpara; Ugiriama, Uzi; Agbama/Owhodue, Uzi; Onyaruwe St., Okogho
Isoko South	Irri II	Ada Primary School, Ada - Irri; Eto Primary School, Ivori, Ivori Ogege; Eto Primary School, Ivori, Ivori Okpomoku; Eto Primary School, Ivori, Ivori Etevie; Eto Primary School, Ivori, Ivori Ugbuku; Inyelogbo Quarters, Idheze; Idheze Primary School, Idheze; Egbo Quarters, Idheze; Ugbakwokwo Quarters, Idheze; Obrogo Primary School, Orie I; Obrogo Primary School, Orie II; Orie Town Hall, Orie; Uro Town Hall, Uro I; Uro Town Hall, Uro II; Ewoma Primary School, Ivrogbo; Ivrogbo Town Hall, Ivrogbo; Ikpide Town Hall, Ikpide; Utue Town, Utue; Uro Primary School, Uro I; Uro Primary School, Uro II
Ndokwa East	Ossissa	Adofi Primary School, Ossissa Umuosimili I; Adofi Primary School, Ossissa Umuosimili II; Adofi Primary School, Ossissa Umuosimili III; Obiogwa Umuokolo Utchi I; Obiogwa Umuokolo Utchi II; Umueze Primary School, Umueze I; Umueze Primary School, Umueze II; Umuleke Primary School, Umueyi/Dewaye I; Umuleke Primary School, Umueyi/Dewaye II; Oloa Primary School, Oloa - Ossissa
Ndokwa East	Afor/Obikwele	Etiti Primary School, Afor, Umuachi Afor; Ogbodigbo Primary School, Ogbodigbo; Okolori Primary School, Okolori, Okolori/Umuachi - Ogo; Iselegu Primary School, Umuachi-Ogo, Iselegu; Iselegu Primary School, Iselegu, Iselegu; Obiogwa Umuokpala; Amenyi Primary School, Obikwele I; Amenyi Primary School, Obikwele II
Ndokwa East	Abarra/Inyi/Onuaboh	Abara Primary School, Aballa-Uno I; Abara Primary School, Aballa-Uno II; Osikpo Primary School, Aballa Obodo III; Izah Primary School, Aballa Oshimili; Onuaboh Primary School, Onuaboh I; Onuaboh Primary School, Onuaboh II; Nnobia Primary School, Inyi I; Nnobia Primary School, Inyi II; Nnobia Primary School, Inyi III; Nnobia Primary School, Inyi IV
Ndokwa East	Okpai/Utchi/Beneku	Beneku Primary School, Beneku I; Beneku Primary School, Beneku II; Akatulu Primary School, Agidigbo; Isu-Ani Obecha, Obecha Utchi I; Isu-Ani Obecha, Obecha Utchi II; Oluchi Primary School, Okpai Oluchi; Market Square, Oluchi, Okpai - Oluchi; Metu Primary School, Okpai- Anieze; Umom Primary Schools, Okpai -Obeze; Obodoyibo Primary School, Okpai Obodoyibo; Njikoka Primary School, Umuochi Utchi; Owala Primary School, Onicha Utchi; Obalu Primary School, Utchi, Utchi
Ndokwa East	Aboh/Akarrai	Church Premises Edegiriga. Edegiriga/Abuator I; Church Premises Edegiriga. Edegiriga/Abuator II; Government Market, Aboh I; Government Market, Aboh II; Government Market, Aboh III; Ogwezi Primary School, S Aboh III; Ogwezi Pry. Sch. Aboh III (Old Customary Court Aboh Iyioji /Obienebeh); Abalagada Primary School, Abalagada; To-Kwu Primary School, Agwe, Agwe Iyom; Isionukpor Primary School, Isionukpor; Esike Primary School, Umuti; Etiti Primary School, Akarrai - Etiti; Akarrai Obodo Primary School, Akarrai - Obodo I; Akarai Obodo Primary School, Akarrai - Obodo II; Onyema Primary School, Afiankwo Iyowo
Ndokwa East	Onyia/Adiai/Otuoku/Umuolu	Ntu-Onumu Primary School, Omuolu I; Ntu-Onumu Primary School, Omuolu II; Ntu-Onumu Primary School, Omuolu III; Eshiogbe Primary School, Okpokorika Ogbesu; Onyuku Primary School, Onyah I; Onyuku Primary School, Onyah II; Anieze Primary School, Oworobia; Edero Primary School, Warri Irri; Ukpo Primary School, Utuoku; Adiai Obiaka Primary School, Adiai I; Adiai Obiaka Primary School, Adiai II
Ndokwa East	Ase	Egbeme Primary School, Egbeme, Egbeme; Ebeneze Primary School, Ase I; Ebeneze Primary School, Ase II; Ebeneze Primary School, Ase, Ase III; Play Ground, Ogbokor; Obiogwa Ekregbesi; Niger Primary School, Asaba Ase I; Niger Primary School, Asaba Ase II; Niger Primary School, Asaba Ase III; Niger Primary School, Asaba Ase IV
Ndokwa East	Ibedeni	Ibedeni Primary School, Ibedeni; Obiogwa, Obiofu; Obioma Primary School, Azagba I; Obioma Primary School, Azagba II; Ekpe Primary School, Ekpe; Asafo Primary School, Asafo
Ndokwa East	Ibrede/Igbuku / Onogbokor	Egbedi Primary School, Ibrede I; Egbedi Primary School, Ibrede II; Egbedi Primary School, Ibrede III; Egbedi Primary School, Ibrede IV; Egbedi Primary School, Ibrede V; Egbedi Primary School, Ibrede VI; Egbedi Primary School, Ibrede VII; Uzobe Primary School, Awa; Anyama Open Space, Anyama; Igbuku Primary School, Igbuku I; Igbuku Primary School, Igbuku II; Igbuku Primary School, Igbuku III; Market Square, Onogbokor; Otuto Ughe Primary School, Onogbokor; Orewo Primary School, Iyede Ame I; Orewo Primary School, Iyede Ame II; Orewo Primary School, Iyede Ame III; Orewo Primary School, Iyede Ame IV; Odo Primary School, Lagos Iyede
Ndokwa East	Ashaka	Ozoma - Ukwu Primary School, Ashaka I; Ozoma - Ukwu Primary School, Ashaka II; Ozoma - Ukwu Primary School, Ashaka III; Ogene Primary School, Ashaka I; Ogene Primary School, Ashaka II; Ashaka Primary School, Ashaka I; Ashaka Primary School, Ashaka II; Eguede Primary School, Eguede; Ugute Primary School, Ugute I; Ugute Primary School, Ugute II; Odude Primary School, Ushie I; Odude Primary School, Ushie II
Ndokwa West	Utagba Ogbe	Iyi - Atu Primary School - Umusadege Quarters; Iyi - Atu Primary School - Umusadege/Isu-Uyo I; Owessei Primary School - Umusadege/Isu-Uyo II; Owessei Primary School - Umusadege/Isu-Uyo III; Prison Club - Hospital/Prison/Police; Azunze Primary School, Azagba/Azunze; Obiogwa Umusadege - Umusadege Quarters; Osamele Primary School, Osamele Quarters; Utagba-Ogbe Grammar School - Akala/Ekwekene/Ogugu; Utagba-Ogbe Grammar School - Ipo/Udeaka; Obiogwa Umuseti - Ogbe - Iso/Ogbe Asaba; Obiogwa Umuseti - Ogbe - Etu/Agboikai; Obiogwa Eke - Umuseti/Eke; Obiogwa Umusam - Umusam Quarters I; Obiogwa Umusam - Umusam Quarters II; Obiogwa - Ogbeani; Obiogwa - Isumpe Quarters; Co-Op. Shopping Centre - Afia Eze Road; Eke Model Primary School - Umusadeli/Ogbatuma; Lagos - Ogbe Primary School - Lagos Ogbe; Obiogwa - Eke - Isumpe Road; Health Centre - Umusadege/Igwala Ofuzor Road; Etim - Uku Primary School - Obetim; Obiogwa Obetim - Obetim; Utagba - Ogbe Grammar School - Akala/Ekwekene; Obiogwa - Umusadege; Agboikai Centre - Agboikai Village; Umusadeli Town Hall - Ogbeatuma/Umusadeli; Obetim Secondary School - Chukwuma/Anuama/Ogwechi/Udema Camp
Ndokwa West	Utagba Uno I	Obiogwa Etua Quarters; Etua - Ukpo Primary School, Etua - Ukpo; Town Hall Mechelin; Obiogwa Ogo Ikilibi; Etua - Ise Primary School, Etua Oliogo; Obiogwa Etua Oliogo; Etua - Etiti Primary School, Etua - Etiti I; Etua - Etiti Primary School, Etua - Etiti II
Ndokwa West	Utagba Uno II	Obiogwa Okpuchini; Farm Settlement Primary School, Farm Settl. Envr.; Adege Primary School, Umunze/Umuakala I; Adege Primary School, Umunze/Umuakala II; Girls Secondary School Ebo/Umuze/Aneh/Umuanze; Igala - Uku Primary School Umuebo/Ossai/Umualam I; Igala - Uku Primary School Umuebo/Ossai/Umualam II; Obiogwa Umuze/Umueleku; Akpuafor Primary School Akpuafor/Obiunor; Onyekachie Primary School, Iku Umusam; Obiogwa - Oliogo Oliogo Umuseti; Ezeti Primary School, Ogbe Asaba/Ogbe - Ise I; Ezeti Primary School, Ogbe Asaba/Ogbe - Ise II; Ulogwe Primary School, Ulogwe Isumpe I; Ulogwe Primary School, Ulogwe Isumpe II; Obi - Uno Isumpe - Obi - Uno Isumpe; Obiogwa Ndemili, Ndemili I; Obiogwa Ndemili, Ndemili II; Obiogwa, Obi Ilugo; Obiogwa Ndemili, Ndemili
Ndokwa West	Utagba Uno III	Obiogwa - Isumpe Isumpe Quarters I; Obiogwa - Isumpe Isumpe Quarters II; Obiogwa - Isumpe Isumpe Quarters III; Obiogwa - Umuseti Umuseti Quarters I; Obiogwa - Umuseti Umuseti Quarters II; Obiogwa - Umuseti Umuseti Quarters III; Obiogwa Umusam Umusam/Ogbeomi; Obiogwa Umusadege Umusadege; Ndueze Primary School - Umusadege; Obiogwa Umusadeli; Ukabi Primary School, Ukabi/Abam; Obiogwa - Umuseti Akakpani Umuseti; Obiogwa Ikilibi Uno; Ebologu Primary School, Ogbe-Eke Umusamuno; Ndueze Primary School, Umusadege; Obiogwa - Isumpe Isumpe Quarters
Ndokwa West	Onicha - Ukwani	Asamala Primary School Asamala/Ugiliamai; Asamala Primary School Ogbekani/Ugiliamai; Obiogwa Ugiliamai/Obiaka; Akpuodagwe Primary School, Amoji I; Akpuodagwe Primary School, Amoji II; Adoh Primary School, Enweshi I; Adoh Primary School, Umu-Ugulu Quarters; Adoh Primary School, Umu - Nzene Quarters I; Adoh Primary School, Umu - Nzene Quarters II; Adoh Primary School, Umu - Nzene Quarters III; Ibabu Primary School, Ibabu I; Ibabu Primary School, Ibabu II; Obi Ukpo Primary School, Obi - Ukpo; Amoji Primary School II Amoji III; Onicha Ukwuani Mixed Secondary School - Ugiliam Unor; Obiogwa - Ugiliamai/Obiaka
Ndokwa West	Ogume I	Ezedogume Primary School - Ogbe Inotu Ogume I; Ezedogume Primary School - Ogbe Inotu Ogume II; Ezedogume Primary School - Ogbe Uku; Dispensary - Ogbe Odua/Odolu I; Old Town Hall - Ogbe Anoka/Achi I; Obiogwa - Ogbe Ashaka/Achi; Igbe Primary School - Ogbe Okoh/Olile/Awaeka II; Ishieni Primary School - Ogbe Ofu Utue/Onicha; Igbe Primary School - Ogbe Okoh/Olile/Awaeke; Igbe Primary School - Ogbe Osakwenike; Ishieni Primary School - Utue - Aka/Osuogbe; Town Hall - Ogbe Anoka/Achi II; Dispensary - Ogbe Odua/Odolu II
Ndokwa West	Ogume II	Ogbagu Primary School, Ogbeazuobi/Amai/Nkpu; Ogbagu Primary School, Okolori; Obiogwa - Umuoma, Owa, Ukor, Uzu Uguta I; Obiogwa - Umuoma, Owa, Ukor, Uzu Uguta II; Chime Uku Primary School - Umuchime Ovala; Obiogwa - Umuchime Uno; Nduku Primary School - Ogbe Ikolobie, Okpete Nkpulaku Quarters; Nduku Primary School - Utagba/Annam I; Nduku Primary School - Utagba/Annam II; Obodougwa Primary School - Obodougwa/Ofu I; Obodougwa Primary School - Obodougwa/Ofu II; Obiogwa Ogbole-Ogbe Okpete/Ikelobie/Nkpulaku; Obiogwa - Umuoma, Owa, Ukor, Uzu Uguta Quarters
Ndokwa West	Abbi I	Okka Primary School - Umugbe, Umuokpala, Quarters; Okka Primary School - Umualu, Egbaokpala; Udodi Primary School - Umuatu/Egbaga I; Udodi Primary School - Umuatu/Egbaga II; Okwelle Main Market - Edemgbu; Okwelle Main Market - Umu - Odagwe Umu Onowuata; Udodi Primary School - Umuonwu, Umu Odagwe Egbata/Okpala; F. S. P. Centre - Umuatu & Umuechi; Udodi Primary School - Okwele Quarters I; Udodi Primary School - Okwele Quarters II
Ndokwa West	Abbi II	Umia Primary School - Eba-Okpala, Umu-Onyugba; Umia Primary School - Udu Ogbe Uku; Umia Primary School - Umu - Ugbo; Opp. Women Shopping Centre - Ogbe Ugba/ Ogbe Akpulu; Umia Primary School, Umu - Igo, Ogbe Ofu; Umia Primary School, Ejakita, Ogbem - Kpu; Umia Primary School, Ejakita, Eba - Ekele; Elovie Primary School - Ukanabo Nta; Elovie Primary School - Ogbe Ole/Odioki - Obiofor; Elovie Primary School - Umu-Eze Uku/Ogbe Ofu; Elovie Primary School - Ukanabo/Uku/Eba - Amai; Elovie Primary School - Eba-Amai/Iyeze; Elovie Primary School - Ogbe Uku/Efulu, Ogbeaka Ejakita; Umia Primary School - Ogbe Eti/Ogbe Nani/Ejakita Eba Amai/Nkpu/Eba Okubor; Elovie Primary School - All Quarters
Ndokwa West	Emu	Olor Primary School - Etevie Umuse, Ogbe Onodi; Olor Primary School -Ogbolum, Aku Umuse, Ikosa Quarters; Olor Primary School - Ajonogu/Obi Ofu Quarters; Olor Primary School - Umu-Ozegbe Ossai Quarters; Olor Primary School - Ikosa Uku/Iyasele Quarters; Olor Primary School - Umu Ofe/Umu Akpashia Quarters; Maternity Home - Umuodio, Aku, Ikosa Quarters; Obiogo Primary School - Obiogo Quarters; Obiogo Primary School - Ogbe Ogwashi/Okpai Quarters; Etiti Primary School - Enweshi, Uku, Oka Quarters; Etiti Primary School - Enweshi Oku, Oka/Odolu Quarters; Etiti Primary School - Agbai/Odolu, Emu, Obodeti; Otuole Primary School - Ibabu, Odoro, Ata Quarters; Otuole Primary School - Obianwu/Ifeoma/Ogbe Iso; Otuole Primary School - Uku, Iyasele, Warri; Emu Iyasele Primary School - Emu Iyasele I & II; Ebendo Primary School - Ogbe Ukwu Quarters; Town Hall - Uku/Oka; Obiogwu - Ogbenodi/Umu Ojugbeli; Emu Iyasele Primary School - Emu Iyasele I & II Quarters
Okpe	Orerokpe	Pavilion Police Station I; Pavilion Police Station II; Palace Gate I; Palace Gate II; Adane - Okpe Primary School, Orerokpe I; Adane - Okpe Primary School, Orerokpe II; Adane - Okpe Primary School, Orerokpe III; Adane - Okpe Primary School, Orerokpe IV; Adane - Okpe Primary School, Orerokpe V; Customary Court, Orodje Road; Orhue Primary School, Orerokpe I; Orhue Primary School, Orerokpe II; Okuloho Primary School, Okuloho I; Okuloho Primary School, Okuloho II
Okpe	Oviri - Okpe	Okorodudu Primary School, Oviri - Okpe; Iribagun Street, Oviri - Okpe; Okorodudu Primary School, Oviri - Okpe I; Okorodudu Primary School, Oviri - Okpe II; Okorodudu Primary School, Oviri - Okpe III; Okorodudu Primary School, Oviri - Okpe IV; Okorodudu Primary School, Oviri - Okpe V; Okorodudu Primary School, Oviri - Okpe VI; Umiaghwa Primary School, Umiaghwa I; Umiaghwa Primary School, Umiaghwa II; Umiaghwa Primary School, Umiaghwa III; Umiaghwa Primary School, Umiaghwa IV; Umiaghwa Primary School, Umiaghwa V
Okpe	Oha I	Oghwere Primary School, Oha Town I; Oghwere Primary School, Oha Town II; Oha Town Hall, Oha Town I; Oha Town Hall, Oha Town II; Oha Town Hall, Oha Town III; Okuokoko Town Hall, Okuokoko I; Okuokoko Town Hall, Okuokoko II; Osubi Town Hall, Osubi I; Osubi Town Hall, Osubi II; Ugolo Town Hall, Ugolo I; Ugolo Town Hall, Ugolo II; Okuodiete Town Hall, Okuodiete; Okozi Town Hall, Okozi I; Okozi Town Hall, Okozi II; Okurowhe Town Hall, Okurowhe; Okurikperhe Town Hall, Okurikperhe I; Okurikperhe Town Hall, Okurikperhe II
Okpe	Oha II	Adagbrassa Town Hall, Adagbrassa I; Adagbrassa Town Hall, Adagbrassa II; Adagbrassa Town Hall, Adagbrassa III; Adagbrassa Town Hall, Adagbrassa IV; Odjedi Town Hall, Odjedi; Amuokpokpo Town Hall, Amuokpokpo I; Amuokpokpo Town Hall, Amuokpokpo II; Okwitaire Town Hall, Okwitaire; Ughwagba Town Hall, Ughwagba I; Ughwagba Town Hall, Ughwagba II; Okuighele Town Hall, Okuighele; Evwriyen Primary School, Evwriyen I; Evwriyen Primary School, Evwriyen II; Okwidiemo Primary School, Okwidiemo
Okpe	Aghalokpe	S. P. C. C. Aghalokpe I; S. P. C. C. Aghalokpe II; Ajagolo Primary School, Aghalokpe I; Ajagolo Primary School, Aghalokpe II; Ogoni Primary School, Aghalokpe I; Ogoni Primary School, Aghalokpe II; Ogoni Primary School, Aghalokpe III; Ogoni Primary School, Aghalokpe IV; Unurhie Town, Aghalokpe; Ajaguoyibo Town Hall, Ajaguoyibo I; Ajaguoyibo Town Hall, Ajaguoyibo II; Ohwarohwa Town Hall Ohwarohwa; Igugudu Town Hall, Igugudu, Aghalokpe
Okpe	Aragba Town	Aragba Town Hall, Aragba I; Aragba Town Hall, Aragba II; Aragba Town Hall, Aragba III; Aragba Town Hall, Aragba IV; Edjeba Primary School, Edjeba; Ovwori Primary School, Ovwori I; Ovwori Primary School, Ovwori II; Adagbrassa Town Hall, Adagbrassa I; Adagbrassa Town Hall, Adagbrassa II; Adavware Town Hall, Adavware; Ogiribo Town Hall, Ogiribo
Okpe	Mereje I	Ekokor Primary School, Ekokor I; Ekokor Primary School, Ekokor II; Egborode Primary School, Egborode I; Egborode Primary School, Egborode II; Egborode Town Hall, Egborode I; Egborode Town Hall, Egborode II; Egborode Town Hall, Egborode III; Mereje Town Hall, Mereje I; Mereje Town Hall, Mereje II; Mereje Town Hall, Mereje III; Mereje Town Hall, Mereje IV; Ifuama Town Hall, Eroghor; Okwokolo Town Hall, Okwokolo I; Okwokolo Town Hall, Okwokolo II; Okwuvo Town Hall, Okwuvo I; Okwuvo Town Hall, Okwuvo II
Okpe	Mereje II	Oviri Court, Adeje; Adeje Primary School, Adeje I; Adeje Primary School, Adeje II; Egbeleku Primary School, Egbeleku; Okwijorogu Town Hall, Okwijorogu; Okwejeba Primary School, Okwejeba; Okugbogbo Town Hall, Okugbogbo; Okuemoefe Town Hall, Okuemoefe; Iriama Primary School, Iriama I; Iriama Primary School, Iriama II; Opuraja Primary School, Opuraja I; Opuraja Primary School, Opuraja II; Opuraja Primary School, Opuraja III; Opuraja Primary School, Opuraja IV; Alelodje Town Hall, Alelodje; Ikpokpogri Town Hall, Ikpokpogri
Okpe	Mereje III	Oyenke Town Hall, Oyenke I; Oyenke Town Hall, Oyenke II; Oyenke Town Hall Oyenke III; Jakpa Town Hall, Jakpa; Okuobude Town Hall, Okuobude; Okuogholo Town Hall, Okuogholo; Okuetolor Town Hall, Okuetolor I; Okuetolor Town Hall, Okuetolor II; Okuetolor Town Hall, Okuetolor III; Okobia Primary School, Okobia I; Okobia Primary School, Okobia II; Okuegume Town Hall, Okuegume; Okolovu Town Hall, Okolovu; Okufuoma Town Hall, Okufuoma; Okuovwisi Town Hall, Okuovwisi
Okpe	Ughoton	Ubrete Town Hall, Ughoton I; Ubrete Town Hall, Ughoton II; Ometa Primary School, Ughoton; Ughoton Primary School, Ughoton; Ughoton Primary School Ughoton; Idodo Town Hall, Ughoton; Ugbokodo Town Hall, Ugbokodo I; Ugbokodo Town Hall, Ugbokodo II; Ugbokodo Town Hall, Ugbokodo III; Ugbokodo Town Hall, Ugbokodo IV; Jeddo Town Hall, Jeddo; Jeddo Udumuegheleta, Jeddo; Udumurhie Town Hall, Jeddo I; Udumurhie Town Hall, Jeddo II; Udumuevbahah, Jeddo; Ubrete, Jeddo; Udumuagworo, Jeddo; Jeddo Primary School, Jeddo I; Jeddo Primary School, Jeddo II
Oshimili - North	Ebu	Ubueni Primary School - Okudu/Okele/Ogor; Ubueni Primary School - Araka-Ogoli/Arakodieke/Ogbe - Ogaole; Oja Primary School - Iyiagashimili/Aganike/Amama - Legele/Ugbolo; St. Paul's G/School, Ekpechori/Ekpechor Village I; St. Paul's G/School, Ekpechori/Ekpechor Village II
Oshimili - North	Illah	Ngegwu Primary School - Ngegwu Camps; Omorka Primary School - Umuagwu/Umutei Camps/Ukpologwu And Camps; Illah Customary Court - Umuagwu/Umutei Camps/Ukpologwu And Camps; Iyioka Primary School - Ajaji/Ogbeoje/Ogbeolu/Umufedem/Iyioka And Camps; Illah Town Hall/Ukumegbe/Onyia/Umuyagbu Camps/Ogbeobi/Ogbeonaje; In Front Of The Hall - Ukumege/Onyia/Umuyagbli Camps/Ogbeobi/Ogbe Onaje; Open Space By Waterside Gwulugwulu Camps And Environs; Ogwa Iyegbu - Iyegbu Camps And Environs I; Ogwa Iyegbu - Iyegbu Camps And Environs II
Oshimili - North	Ibusa I	Omu Girls Primary School - Ezekwu/Umuoloto/Umuelioko/Obiofugo; Ogwu Ogwa Ogboli-Ogboli/Umuodogwu/Adiosha; Anyalogbor Primary School - Achalla And Environs; Umuodegwu Hall - Ozeogboli/Umutashia/Umuomokwea/Adigwe; Ezekeke Hall-Umuokpala/Umumodi/Umuzekea/Ogbeatakpo/Umuachosia Camps I; Ezekeke Hall-Umuokpala/Umumodi/Umuzekea/Ogbeatakpo/Umuachosia Camps II
Oshimili - North	Ibusa II	Ibusa Post Office - Isieke/Mkpikolo/Umuogbele/Idumuigba; Ogwa Isieke - Isieke/Mkpikolo/Umuobele/Idumuigba; Mkpanyala Hall - Idumuochawe/Mkpanyala /Idumuezejei/Umuogwo/Umuebo; Ogbeowele Hall - Nwaeze/Isiuzo/Ugbolu Umuaja/Ogboli/Aligbo/Iduobi/Umuebo; Ogbeowele Hall -Aligbo/Iduobi/Umuebo/Umuowor/Umuzoma; Ogwa Odonkwu - Odonkwu Camps And Environs
Oshimili - North	Ibusa III	Umejei Primary School - Umuisagba/Umuinagba/Umuidi/Umunagwu And Camps; Ugwatakpo Primary School - Anamanya/Umuobi/Umunwa/Nnesianuli Village/St Augustines College And Envir; Omu Boys Primary School - Odaukwu/Odafe Isiuzo/Obi Ajudua And Environs; Isingene Hall - Idumuogbu And Environs; Akwuogonogo Hall - Akwuogonogo Camps; Ogwa Ani-Ikpu - Ani-Ikpu Camp And Environs
Oshimili - North	Ibusa IV	Ezemese Primary School - Umuisor Village I; Ezemese Primary School - Umuisor Village II; Ezemese Primary School - Okponta Village I; Ezemese Primary School - Okponta Village II; Ezemese Primary School - Okponta Village III
Oshimili - North	Ibusa V	Anioshe Primary School - Umubekwu/Umuwai/Umualofe; Isunambuogu Primary School - Ogbeidibo/Umuosodi/Umuolo/Umunwaina; Isunambuogu Primary School - Umuedem/Umuoche/Obodoakpu/Nkpoji; Ogwa Umuneze - Nkpakpu/Obiyam/Umuege/Asikasi Camps And Environs; Aniokwe Hall - Akwugboko/Akwu - Ose/Ani-Akpako/Aniokwe Camp And Environs I; Aniokwe Hall - Akwugboko/Akwu - Ose/Ani-Akpako/Aniokwe Camp And Environs II
Oshimili - North	Okpanam	Mgbala Primary School - Umuobodo/Ogbeode And Umuchima Villages; Health Centre - Umuosuma/Umuonahe/Odogwu And Asaya Camps; Town Hall - Umumale/Umuomake/Ogbeobi/Ogbeojie; Budget Bank/Ashia Eke - Idigbaoji/Idigbaocha/Umuobiaye; Tai Solarin Primary School - Okwute Ugbo/Iyiabi/Iyioyibo/Post Office/Old Asaba Road; Achalla Hall - Amachai/Agbahwe Camp/Ogana III Camps/Ogbe Ojie Camps; Umugbah Primary School Ogbeozoma/Anikpo Camps; Saviors Apostolic Church - Ogbeosadi Okotomi/Delei/Anwai Camp; Ugbolu Primary School I - Amachai/Mile 5/Anwai Godwin Camps; Ugbolu Primary School II - Ogbe Obi/Ogbeiyase/Ugwunwosu And Others
Oshimili - North	Ukala	Okwute Primary School - Umutonor/Umueze; Okpunor Primary School - Umusizor Village; Okpunor Primary School - Umutonor Village I; Okpunor Primary School - Umutonor Village II; Aniwalo Primary School - Aninwalo I Camp
Oshimili - South	Ogbele/Akpako	Ekeanya Primary School - Oko-Ogbele I; Ekeanya Primary School - Oko-Ogbele II; Ekeanya Primary School - Odifulu; Ekeanya Primary School - Agwe; Ekeanya Primary School - Obindigbo/Onuoza; Ekeanya Primary School - Ndiobi; Ekeanya Primary School - Nnochie; Akpako Primary School - Akpako; Akpako Primary School - Anioji/Aniugo; Akpako Primary School - Aninta
Oshimili - South	Anala-Amakom	Anala Primary School - Anala I; Anala Primary School - Anala II; Anala Primary School - Anala III; Anala Primary School - Anala IV; Obi-Okpu Primary School - Obi-Okpu I; Obi-Okpu Primary School - Obi-Okpu II; Amakom Primary School - Amakom I; Amakom Primary School - Amakom II; Amakom Primary School - Uwale, Uwaikpai; Amakom Primary School - Idokomadu
Oshimili - South	Okwe	Okwe Primary School - Okwe I; Okwe Primary School - Okwe II; Okwe Primary School - Okwe III; Okwe Primary School - Okwe IV; Okwe Primary School - Delta Housing Estate; Okwe Primary School - Police Barracks; Okwe Primary School
Oshimili - South	Umuezei	Asagba Primary School - Umuobi/Umuanukposi I; Asagba Primary School - Umuobi/Umuanukposi II; Asagba Primary School - Umunkwo I; Asagba Primary School - Umunkwo II; Asagba Primary School - Umuiyibu; Asagba Primary School - Idumuodikpe; Asagba Primary School - Umuokwubata; Asagba Primary School - Idumuojei; Asagba Primary School - Amilimocha Camp; Asagba Primary School - Ochele; Asagba Primary School - Obodoachala; Niger Mixed Secondary School - Ezenei Avenue/Umuezei I; Niger Mixed Secondary School - Ezenei Avenue/Umuezei II; Niger Mixed Secondary School - Ezenei Avenue/Umuezei III
Oshimili - South	Umuaji	Abu-Ato Primary School - Umuezei/Umudaeze; Abu-Ato Primary School - Atufa/Afeke I; Abu-Ato Primary School - Atufa/Afeke II; Abu-Ato Primary School - Atufa/Afeke III; Abu-Ato Primary School - Umuekwo; St. Brigid's G. G. School - Umuekwo I; St. Brigid's G. G. School - Umuekwo II; St. Brigid's G. G. School - Umuekwo III; St. Brigid's G. G. School - Umuda/Uda Layout; St. Brigid's G. G. School - Agueze; Oduke Nursery School - Oduke Camp
Oshimili - South	Umuonaje	Otu-Ogwu Open Space (Olg Nursery Sch. Umuonaje I); Otu-Ogwu Open Space (Olg Nursery Sch. Umuonaje II); Otu-Ogwu-Ogbeke Hall (Olg Nursery Sch. Umuonaje III); Ogwa - Ogbeke Hall (Olg Nursery Sch. Umuonaje III); Ogwa Elibujor - Elibujor I; Ogwa Elibujor - Elibujor II; Ogwa Umuobioko - Kwekagbor/Umujiaga; Ogwa Umuobioko - Kwekagbor/Akwocha Red; Ogwa Obioko - Umugbabi/Umuoje; Ogwa Umuonyia - Umuonyia/Umuolor; Ogwa Umuonyia - Iyiabi/Akwuose Camp; Idumugbe - Idumugbe/Akwuocha
Oshimili - South	Agu	Zappa Primary School - Umuinalu/Environ I; Zappa Primary School - Umuinalu/Environ II; Zappa Primary School - Umuinalu/Environ III; Zappa Primary School - Umuinalu/Environ IV; Zappa Primary School - Umuinalu/Environ V; Ogwa Umuagu - Umuhagbame/Ogbeami (By Mag. Court) I; Ogwa Umuagu - Umuhagbame/Ogbeami (By Mag. Court) II; Ogwa Umuagu - Umuhagbame/Ogbeami (By Mag. Court) III; Ogwa Umuagu - Ogbe Onishe I; Ogwa Umuagu - Ogbe Onishe II
Oshimili - South	Ugbomanta Quarters	Ogwa Umudaike/ - Umudaike - Dike St. I; Ogwa Umudaike/ - Umudaike - Dike St. II; Ogwa Umuonishe - Isieke I; Ogwa Umuonishe - Isieke II; Regina Mundi Primary School - Ogbe Osowa/Ogbeawo I; Regina Mundi Primary School - Ogbe Osowa/Ogbeawo II; Regina Mundi Primary School - Ogbe Osowa/Ogbeawo III; Regina Mundi Primary School - Ogbe Osowa/Ogbeawo IV; Regina Mundi Primary School - Ogbe Osowa/Ogbeawo V; Ogwa Ogbeogwugwu - Ogbeogwugwu
Oshimili - South	West End	Asaba G. G. School - Stadium And Environs I; Asaba G. G. School - Stadium And Environs II; Uzoigwe Primary School - Uzoigwe And Environs I; Uzoigwe Primary School - Uzoigwe And Environs II; Uzoigwe Primary School - Uzoigwe And Environs III; Uzoigwe Primary School -Akwutu-Ugbo/Okotomi I; Uzoigwe Primary School -Akwutu-Ugbo/Okotomi II; Uzoigwe Primary School -S. P. C. /Environs I; Uzoigwe Primary School -S. P. C. /Environs II; Uzoigwe Primary School - Central Hospital/Environs I; Uzoigwe Primary School - Central Hospital/Environs II; Anwai Primary School - Anwai I; Anwai Primary School - Anwai II; Anwai Primary School - Abedu/Osemele Camp I; Anwai Primary School - Abedu/Osemele Camp II
Oshimili - South	Cable Point I	Omelugboma By Ricemill - Omelugboma; Oneh Primary School - Mammy Market; Oneh Primary School -D/Osadebay Way; Oneh Primary School - Strubb Street; Oneh Primary School - Onwuka Ogbor St.; Oneh Primary School - R/Side Of Nnebisi Road I; Oneh Primary School - R/Side Of Nnebisi Road II; Oneh Primary School - R/Side Of Nnebisi Road III; Oneh Primary School - R/Side Of Nnebisi Road IV; Oneh Primary School - Marine Road; Oneh Primary School - Ani-Ahaba; Customary Court Of Appeal - Nnebisi Road/Environ; Customary Court Of Appeal - Left Side Of Nnebisi Road/Environ; Powerline Primary School - Powerline; College Of Education - College Of Education/Shangotola I; College Of Education - College Of Education/Shangotola II; College Of Education - College Of Education/Shangotola III
Oshimili - South	Cable Point II	Ahabam Primary School - Elenchele Quarters; Ahabam Primary School -Obinakueze; Ahabam Primary School - Jarret Street I; Ahabam Primary School - Jarret Street II; Ahabam Primary School - Jarret Street III; Ahabam Primary School - Abagana Veterinary I; Ahabam Primary School - Abagana Veterinary II; Ogbeolie Primary School - Nnwuna/Monyei St.; Ogbeolie Primary School - Lagos St./Nkechi; Ogbeolie Primary School - Apuneze Street; Ogbeolie Primary School - Maduemezie St/Ogbeofu; Sub Post Office - Edozie Quarters I; Sub Post Office - Edozie Quarters II; Sub Post Office - Edozie Quarters III
Patani	Abari	Prewari; Aredeinghari; Abazi; Kabezi; New Perwari; New Aredeinghazi/Ayinma Primary School I; New Aredeinghazi/Ayinma Primary School II
Patani	Patani I	Opreza Grammar School I; Oproza Grammar School II; Okuruware By Garage; Oruware; Osuware I; Osuware II; Aruke Primary School I; Aruke Primary School II
Patani	Patani II	Ekise I; Ekise II; Ekise III; Ekise IV; Ekise V; Ogor I; Ogor II
Patani	Patani III	Ogiwnware I (Opukabor Primary School); Ogiwnware II (Opukabor Primary School); Akoware I By Junction; Akoware II By Riverside; Afinaware I By Catholic Church; Afinaware II By Catholic Church; Afinaware III By Catholic Church
Patani	Taware/Kolowara Aven	Taware I By Odoko Compound; Taware II By Water Man; Koloware Primary School; Aven I A. P. S., Aven; Aven I I A. P. S., Aven; Toru - Koloware I; Toru - Koloware II
Patani	Agoloma	Korobazi I; Korobazi II; Bounamazi; Engbelemazi; Osinzi Quarters Hall I; Osinzi Quarters Hall II
Patani	Toru-Angiama	Toru-Angiama Primary School, Toru-Angiama; Maternity Centre, Toru-Angiama; Tamukunu, Toru-Angiama; Former Secondary School, Toru-Angiama I; Former Secondary School, Toru-Angiama II
Patani	Bolou - Angiama	Toru - Apelebiri Primary School, Toru - Apelebiri; Boluo - Gbene, Bolou - Angiama; Akubiri Primary School, Bolou - Angiama; Akpogbene, Bolou - Angiama; Amatebe Primary School, Amatabe I; Amatebe Primary School, Amatabe II
Patani	Uduophori	Ese Primary School; Ogbodu Street; Obayedo Street; Etabuko Street; Ugbohwra Hall; By C. M. S. Church; Etovie Quarters Hall; Ugbophro Hall; Otu Street; Uduophori Secondary Comm. School I; Uduophori Secondary Comm. School II
Patani	Odorubu/Adobu/Bolou Apelebri	Odurubu Town Hall; Odurubu By Catholic Church; Uduovie Primary School I; Uduovie Primary School II; Ekrovie Hall; Odurubu College; Orie Primary School, Adobu I; Orie Primary School, Adobu II; Bolou-Apelebiri Primary School I; Bolou-Apelebiri Primary School II; Bolou-Apelebiri Town Hall
Sapele	Sapele Urban I	Sapele Stadium; Stadium/L. G. Secretariat; New Sapele Secretariat I; New Sapele Secretariat II; Front Of Police Barracks; Chude Grammar School, Sapele I; Chude Grammar School, Sapele II; Chude Grammar School, Sapele III; Mafuru Lane By Akintola; Opp. Omoge Enterprise; Major Bowen/Lawrence Junction; Adagor/Agoba Road; Odudu By Fedison; Opp. German Tech.; Izu Road By Research Institute; Adeniyi Road By M, Ajor Bowen Road
Sapele	Sapele Urban II	Omarin Primary School, Sapele I; Omarin Primary School, Sapele II; By Fire Brigade; L. G. A Nursery School, Sapele I; Ayomanor Primary School, Sapele I - I; Ayomanor Primary School, Sapele I - II; Ayomanor Primary School, Sapele I - III; Sanco Lane; Ogaga Lane; Omene Lane; Youth Centre I; Youth Centre II
Sapele	Sapele Urban III	Abbot Primary School, Sapele I; Abbot Primary School, Sapele II; By Kigho Store; Oleh Road By Omokri Lane; Behind Nene Hospital; Awolowo Road By Oleh Road; Along Igere Road; Omene Road By Ebenezer Church; Oleh By Aghoghoruma; Adeola By New Road Junction; Adeola Road, Sapele
Sapele	Sapele Urban IV	Okpe Hall I; Okpe Hall II; Okpe Hall III; Adeloa/Abeke Road Junction; Uherevie Primary School, (Reclamation); Uherevie Primary School, Sapele I; Uherevie Primary School, Sapele II; Uherevie Primary School, Sapele III; Palmer Primary School, Sapele I; Palmer Primary School, Sapele II; Urhiapele Mixed Secondary School, Sapele I; Urhiapele Mixed Secondary School, Sapele II; Urhiapele Mixed Secondary School, Sapele III; Amagiya/Oriakhi Road I; Amagiya/Oriakhi Road II; Abeke/New Road Junction I; Abeke/New Road Junction II
Sapele	Sapele Urban V	Urhiapele Primary School, Sapele I; Urhiapele Primary School, Sapele II; White Inn, Sapele; Garden Of Honour I; Garden Of Honour II; Laboard Road By Urhiapele Ameh; By Sowho Compound; Onomor Quarters; By Apata Church; Adeola Road/Ayomanor Compound; Along Laboard Road/Commercial Avenue; Green Egbedi Road; Ogodo Road By Cemetery Road
Sapele	Sapele Urban VI	Okotie - Eboh Primary School, Sapele I; Okotie - Eboh Primary School, Sapele II; By Ekware Quarters I; By Ekware Quarters II; By 48 Commercial Avenue; Zik Grammar School, Sapele I; Zik Grammar School, Sapele II; Hausa Road Ext. By Obire Quarters; Ethiope Primary School, Sapele I; Ethiope Primary School, Sapele II; Ethiope Primary School, Sapele III; Hausa Quarters By Urhobo Road; Crowther Primary School, Sapele I; Crowther Primary School, Sapele II; St. Luke Primary School, Sapele I; St. Luke Primary School, Sapele II
Sapele	Sapele Urban VII	Ufuoma Primary School, Sapele I; Ufuoma Primary School, Sapele II; Ufuoma Primary School, Sapele III; Oton Primary School, Sapele; Uruaka Quarters; Dedevbo By Oton Road Junction; Along Ugborikoko Road Opp. Ekanone Road; Dedevbo Near Market; Abeke Primary School; Along New Ogorode Road By Uncle Young; Wesley Primary School, Ariwon I; Wesley Primary School, Ariwon II; Aroko Primary School, Ariwon; Ugborikoko Road By Celestial Parish
Sapele	Sapele Urban VIII	Omatsola Primary School, Sapele I; Omatsola Primary School, Sapele II; Yoruba Road By Ext. Macpherson; Aiyetan Primary School, Sapele I; Aiyetan Primary School, Sapele II; Along Ikomi Road By Ogbogbo; Okotie - Eboh Grammar School, Sapele I; Okotie - Eboh Grammar School, Sapele II; Association Primary School, Sapele I; Association Primary School, Sapele II; Front Of Premier Cinema; Nepa Staff School; Naval Base; Ajajiewor
Sapele	Amuokpe	Ogodo Primary School, Sapele I; Ogodo Primary School, Sapele II; O/S Opp. Okirigwre Garrage; O/S Ajemile; St. Itas Girls' Grammar School, Sapele; St. Malachy Grammar School, Sapele; O/S Along Otite Road/Okpobrisi; Ethiope Primary School, Okirigwre; O/S Okuosajere; Okpe Grammar School, Sapele; O/S Ogorode Amuokpe; Ethiope Primary School, Amuokpe I; Amuokpe Hall; Along Old Eku Road By Igbewor's Comp; O/S Eko Village; Ovwore Primary School, Ibada Amuokpe; O/S Agbeku; Adagbrassa Amuokpe; Okwovwuri Village I; Okwovwuri Village II; Ogwere Primary School, Ikwegwu; Efeghren Primary School, Adjekimoni; Ajimikara; Ibiwhor; Ajimile Road By Chief Warri Comp
Sapele	Elume	Oyehen; O/S Ibada Village; Ofurhe Primary School, Ibimidaka; Ituru I And II Village; O/S Onyeke Village; O/S Ogirisen Village; Ogiede Secondary School; O/S Deghele Village; Elume Junction; Adagbrassa Primary School; O/S Iriabome; O/S Edegbrode; Jakpa Village; O/S Oku; Enwoe Primary School Amuokpokpo; O/S Oloho Village; Otoramuan Primary School I; Otoramuan Primary School II; Otoramuan Primary School III; Jakpa Town Hall
Sapele	Okokporo/Ugborhen	Okuovo Town Hall; Ozue Primary School Okuovo I; Ozue Primary School Okuovo II; O/S Okuodede I And II; Okokporo Primary School, Okogborode; Okpakomeje; Ugborhen Primary School, Ugborhewu; Adaka Grammar Adaka; O/S Umuolu Village; Abasare Primary School, Ugbukurusu I; Abasare Primary School, Ugbukurusu II; Ikeresan Primary School, Ikeresan; Obotie Primary School, Obotie; Ugborhen Town Hall
Udu	Udu I	Otor-Udu / Otor - Udu O/S I; Otor-Udu / Otor - Udu; Otor-Udu Town Hall/ Otor - Udu; Fifa Hall/Oghior; Oghior Town Hall/Oghior; Oghior Primary School/Oghior; Otor - Udu Primary School/Otor - Udu I; Otor - Udu Customary Court O/S/Otor - Udu; Otor - Udu Primary School/Otor - Udu II
Udu	Udu II	Owhrode Grammar School, Owhrode I; Owhrode Grammar School, Owhrode II; Owhrode Grammar School, Owhrode III; Emorhia/Owhrode; Erhiephihor Town Hall, Erhiephihor I; Erhiephihor Town Hall, Erhiephihor II; Ovwodokpokpor Town Hall, Ovwodokpokpor
Udu	Udu III	Ogbe-Udu Primary School, Ogbe -Udu; Ogbe-Udu Town Hall, Ogbe -Udu; Ekreghele Town Hall, Ogbe -Udu; Inland Town Hall, Okolor Inland I; Waterside Town Hall, Okolor Waterside; Ukpiovwin Primary School, Ukpiovwin I; Ukpiovwin Primary School, Ukpiovwin II; Ukpiovwin Town Hall, Ukpiovwin
Udu	Udu IV	Emadaja Primary School, Emadaja I; Emadaja Primary School, Emadaja II; Ubogo Primary School, Ubogo I; Ubogo Town Hall, Ubogo; Ubogo Primary School, Ubogo II; Ekrota Town Hall, Ekrota; Ukpererhen Primary School, Ukpererhen; Ukpererhen Town Hall, Ukpererhen; Obubu Primary School, Obubu I; Obubu Primary School, Obubu II; Ugbisi Primary School, Ugbisi; Ugbisi Town Hall, Ugbisi; Jehovah Witness Field, Ubogo
Udu	Opete/Assagba/Edjophe	Opete Primary School, Opete; Opete Primary School II, Opete I; Opete Primary School II, Opete II; Urhodje Primary School, Opete; Opete Playground, Opete; Okpaka Town Hall, Okpaka; Uduevwe Hall, Okpaka; Okpaka Playground, Okpaka
Udu	Ekete	Ekete Town Hall, Ekete Waterside I; Ekete Town Hall, Ekete Waterside II; Ekete Clinic, Ekete Waterside; Ekete Waterside, Ekete Waterside; Ekete Primary School, Ekete Inland; Ekete Town Hall, Ekete Inland; By Ap Petrol Station, Ekete Inland; Owhase Town Hall, Owhase I; Owhase Town Hall, Owhase II; Owhase Primary School, Owhase
Udu	Ovwian I	Ovwian Primary School, Ovwian I; Onos Junction, Ovwian I; Ekrata Hall, Ovwian; Ovwian Town Hall, Ovwian I; Ovwian Town Hall, Ovwian II; Oghworo Hall, Ovwian; Ovwian Junction, Ovwian; Udueyara Hall, Ovwian; Ogodogu Junction, Ovwian; 67 Udu Road, Ovwian; Ovwian Grammar School, Ovwian I; Ovwian Grammar School, Ovwian II
Udu	Ovwian II	Egini Primary School, Egini; Egini Town Hall, Egini; Egiegi Primary School, Egiegi I; Egiegi Primary School, Egiegi II; Oleri Primary School, Oleri I; Oleri Primary School, Oleri II; Ujevwu Primary School, Ujevwu I; Ujevwu Primary School, Ujevwu II; Ujevwu Primary School, Ujevwu III; Ujevwu Town Hall, Ujevwu
Udu	Orhuwhurun	Orhuwhurun Primary School, Orhuwhurun I; Orhuwhurun Primary School, Orhuwhurun II; Dede Primary Sch Orhuwhurun; Orhuwhurun T/H, Orhuwhurun II; African Church, Orhuwhurun; Okaka Hall I, Orhuwhurun; Okaka Hall II, Orhuwhurun; Okpeki Hall I, Orhuwhurun; Okpeki Hall II, Orhuwhurun; Otebor Hall, Orhuwhurun; D. S. C. Primary School, Orhuwhurun; D. S. C. Tech School, Orhuwhurun; D. S. C. Camp. Ext. Primary School I, Orhuwhurun; D. S. C. Secondary E. B/L, Steel Town; D. S. C. Steel I Primary School II, Steel Town; Ekrejegbe Hall, Steel Town; Okolosi Hall, Orhuwhurun; Igbogidi Town Hall, Igbogidi
Udu	Aladja	Aladja Primary School, Aladja I; Aladja Primary School, Aladja II; Aladja T/H, Aladja I; Aladja T/H, Aladja II; Government Medical Centre, Aladja; Epame Primary School, Epame; Ayama Town Hall, Ayama; Iyeghe Town Hall, Aladja; Abadode, Aladja; Ekporhon Town Hall, Aladja; Aladja Waterside, Aladja; Eghurhie Town Hall, Aladja; Ekrewhere Town Hall, Aladja; Obuvwe Town Hall, Aladja; Oruvweruma Town Hall, Aladja; B + B Camp, Aladja I; B + B Camp, Aladja II
Ughelli North	Agbarha	Ogbe Ovwevine/Megrioyibo St./Agbarha P/S; Ovie Palace/Agadigba St./Agbarha P/S; Edoide/Aghalokpe Market Road Adjarho/Agbarha P/S; Oku/Owe/Emeragha/Omodua St./Ozah Compound, Agbarha; Amanimre/Iviegbe/Ededjo/Djanere/Ighene/Udi/Ibru Coll./Ibru, Agbarha; Ujovwhe Village/Ujovhre Town Hill; Ediode/Aghalokpe/Idogun Compound, Agbarha; Ehwahwa Village/Ehwahwa Market, Ehwahwa Village; Osuovwa Primary School, Oghara Village; Omakohwere Town Hall, Omakohwere Village; Edjeba Primary School, Edjeba Village; Ibru Primary School, Awirhe Village I; Ibru Primary School, Awirhe Village II; Agba/Omovwodorhibo Town Hall, Omovwodorhibo Village; Emavwore Primary School, Otogba Village; Samagidi/Idjere/Edjere/Udovie Primary School, Samagidi; Omanogbe Primary School, Owevwe; Ovwevwe Village O/P; Oman Primary School, Otokutu Village; Opherin Etc. Onaerin Town Hall, Ophori Village; Enakpomu Compound, Saniko Village; Okpraode Primary School, Omavovwe; Saniko/Gano Quarters, Gana Village; Okpara Market, Okpara Village; Anaka Primary School, Oteri/Epete; Idjere Comm. Hall, Idjere
Ughelli North	Ogor	Uduokpe Quarters/Owhowha Primary School Otogor; Owhar Quarters/Owhowha Primary School Otogor; Uhurie/Ogbe/Uloho/Otogor Town Hall/Ogbe Emo Quarters, Otogor; Oteri Quarters/Ogbe Raka Quarters/Oiyete Primary School; Erutasa Quarters/Oiyete Primary School; Ogbe Ophori Qaurters/Oiyete Primary School; Ogbe Ophori/Uhurie/Umilahwa/Ofovwe Primary School Ekruse Street; Emono/Ighene Street/Ofovwe Primary School; Ogbe Uloho/Oviri Town Hall, Oviri; Ovwodokpokpo/Iwhrovie Village/Ogor/Ovwodokppokpo Town Hall; Ogbeakan, Ogede & Environs/Edjekota Town Hall, Edjekota; Ogbeize & Environs/Emechieren Hall
Ughelli North	Orogun I	Uku/Okpara Emukpo St./Orogun Primary School, Orogun; Ikei & Ofo St./Orogun Primary School, Orogun; Ovie St./Orogun Primary School, Orogun; Ikorobie Street/Ikorobie Hall; Azuobi Street/Omoru Hall; Okumere/Obughe/Efe Primary School; Orhonigbe Street/Itive Hall; Adejarho/Imodje/Itive Hall; Okpe Village/Okpe Hall; Okpara/Idjerhe Village/Idjerhe Hall; Erhieta Street/Erhieta Hall; Ossai Street/Ossai Hall; Odia/Uku Street/Orogun Primary School; Umuko/Ogwa Street/Ogwa/Umuko Hall; Orhokpokpo Hall, Orhokpokpo Village
Ughelli North	Orogun II	Umieghwa, Imodje/Ekure Primary School, Imodje; Ekrudjezue/Idiovwa/Village/Erovie Quarters/Ekure Primary School, Imodje; Umiavwa Quarters/Erovie Street/Obodeti/Opia Primary School, Obedeti; Umiavwa/Erovie Obodeti/Obodeti Community Town Hall, Obedeti; Asaba/Okorobie/Ovie/Obuma Street/Eboh Primary School; Ojeigu/Idise/Nichikri/Ovie/Obuma Street/Eboh Primary School, Eboh; Ghana/Oprima/Skei/Ikorobie Street/Eboh Grammar School, Eboh; Ogbe-Ofu/Ikorobiest/Aragba Primary School, Aragba; Obarakpo/Mission St. Post Office Road Area/Farm End Umujiota &Unuole St., Aragba; Ofuoma/Ogbe/Ikie Centre/Aragba Postal Agency, Aragba; Ogbe-Uku/Obiofu St./Aragba Grammar School, Aragba; Oralode/Ikorobie St. Aragba Grammar School, Aragba; Obiogo/Uduogbe/Ppgin/Emonu Grammar School, Emonu; Anie/Ibio/Ossa/Ikorobie Street/Obiogo Hall, Emonu; Ossai/Ikorobie Street/Open Space Between Ossai & Ikorobie Street, Emonu; Okuezi/Enedue Quarters/Open Space Between Okuezi & Emonu Quarters, Emonu; Mueta/Ozo/Umuabe/Orise Quarters/Ugono Primary School, Ugono; Okanabo/Ekoku/Odekuo Street, Ugono; Ozuaka/Orhomuri/Orhomuru Community Hall, Orhomuru; Umusu Quarters/Sanubi Village/Unukpo Ogwa Quarters/Sanubi Primary School, Sanubi; Unukpo/Omo Primary School, Ovara; Omo Primary School, Ovara Umusu; Erhobaro Hall, Erhobaro; Onyobru Primary School, Onyobru
Ughelli North	Ughelli I	Otovwodo Town Hall, Uduophor/Uduere Quarters I, Otovwodo; Otovwodo Town Hall, Uduophor/Uduere Quarters II, Otovwodo; Otovwodo Primary School Eghagbomi, Otovwodo; Front Of Kogbodi School, Oghoghovwe Road/School Area, Otovwodo; Uduere Primary School, Yavbie/Eracho/Ekrabovwe Quarters, Uduere Village; Marcauley's Compound, Ighwrovie; Imohwe Quarters/Ataverhe Qtrs., Ekiugbo; Ekiugbo Primary School/C. M. S. Church, Ekiugbo; Ogbe-Eki Junction, C. M. S. Church/Grammar School, Ekiugbo; Celestial Church Junction, Odeghe Old Road/Owhe Farm, Ekiugbo; Ekiugbo Town Hall, Owhe Farm/Ekiugbo Shrine, Ekiugbo; Ekiugbo Town Hall, Igben St./Ogbe Ode To Travellers Cave, Ekiugbo; Unukan's Compound, Ighwrenene; Ighwremaro Market, Ighwremaro; Ighwreko Primary School Mission Road & Environs, Ighwreko; Ighwreko Primary School/Mission Road & Environs/Adonovwe, Ighwreko; Erubase By Esegine/Erubase St., Ughelli; Otobo By Emomejere, Otobo/Erubase, Ughelli; Okorodafe/Otovwiere Junction, Okorodafe/Otovwire St., Ughelli; Opp. Garrage, Okorodafe St. Junction/Market Area, Post Office Road Junction, Ughelli; Mission Road By First Story Building, Okorodafe St. Junction/Mission Road Area, Ughelli; Behind Best Chemist, Onimo Lane & Environs, Ughelli
Ughelli North	Ughelli II	Afiesere Road & Environs/Ogelle Primary School, Ughelli; Afiesere Road & Environs/Opp. Akpodiete St. By Afiesere Road, Ughelli; Upper Afiesere Road/By Ministry Of Education, Ughelli; Upper Afiesere Road/By Otor Edo Inn, Ughelli; Amekpa/Middle Of Amekpa, Ughelli; Ekredjebo St. & Environsupper Afiesere/Middle Of Ekredjebo St., Ughelli; Ekredjebo St. & Environs/Upper Afiesere Road By The Junction, Ughelli; Pipe Line Area/Cemetery Road By Edojariogba Lane, Ughelli; Oharisi Primary School Area, Ughelli; Olori Street/Olori Street, Ughelli; Samuel Oteri St./Open Space By Chief Oghenekevwes House, Ughelli; Sadjere Street/Middle Of Sadjere St., Ughelli; Akpodiete/Eraye/Dafioghor/Akporigbe Street/Eraye Street Junction, Ughelli; Edoge And Environs/Opp. Itor Coll. By Edoge, Ughelli; Akpodiete/Epetuku St./By Prince St. Junction, Ughelli; Uloho Avenue/Ikprukpru Hall, Ughelli; Olori Estate/Low Cost/Nepa Office Area/Noble Crest Nursery Primary School, Ughelli; Sergent Quarters Estate/Opp. Sajere Estate Road, Ughelli; Obukata Ogbe Ode/Itive Primary School, Oteri; Oteri Hall Ogbe Ode/Oteri Hall, Oteri; Agasiona/Itive/Ogbe Eki/Oteri Hall, Ughelli; Emurotu Area/Mariere Hospital, Ughelli; Government College Quarters/Police Barrack/Government College, Ughelli; Oharisi/Mowoe Street/Mowor Junction, Ughelli; Old Post Office, Ovwodorume/Compound Umukueku Compound Quarters/By Delta Line, Ughelli; Ekuogbe Ave Area/Olotu/Eserogh Primary School, Ighwreko St., Ughelli; Ighwreko Street & Environs/Ighwreko Town Hall, Ighwreko; Emosiuwe/Uloho/Buluku/Oka St./Emosivwe By Ministry Of Commerce & Industry, Ughelli; Egone/Ekwrare/Arumala/Agishoni/Temile Street/Arumala Junction, Ughelli; Egor/Osia Street/Osia St. Opp. The Church, Ughelli; Omotor/Urhie Street/Omotor By G. K. S., Ughelli; St. Theresa's/Adagharagba St./Junction/Opp. Police Barrack After The Bridge, Ughelli; Erhimu & Environs/Adagharagba/Erhimu Junction Ojokor & Environs; Awhinawih And Environs/Middle Of Awhinawhi, Ughelli; Ogode Quarters/Ubrete/Ebrimoni/Ofuoma Primary School, Ofuoma; Ekredjebo Town Hall, Ekredjebo Village; Emeragha Town Hall, Emeragha Village
Ughelli North	Ughelli III	Igo Oopre Quarters/Ogbovwa Town Hall, Ogbovwa; Onoborie Quarters Left & Right/Akenu Compound Area/Onochoja Town Hall, Afiesere; Ogba - Okpoko And Environs/Ologbo's Compound, Afiesere; From Grammar School To Pipe Line Area/Afisere Primary School, Afiesere; Uberete Quarters/Ogbe Eki/Afisere Primary School, Afiesere; Uwejeri Town Hall, Owharo Village; Ogbe-Isele/Urhiest/Environs/Afisere Town Hall I, Afiesere; Ogbe-Isele/Urhiest/Environs/Afisere Town Hall II, Afiesere; Odovie Primary School, Odovie; Emetaka/Ogbe/ Urhie/Oghwaredion, Ododegho; Ogbe Ephron/Ighene Oloho/Ediagbon Town Hall, Ododegho; Ujode Town Hall, Ujode; Izomo/Igun Quarters/Opre Uloho/Izomo Primary School, Eruemukowharien; Aka/Uwhe/Egheruaye/Masoge Quarters/Izomo Primary School, Eruemukowharien; Ekrokro Quarters And Environs/Eruemukowhariem Town Hall, Eruemukowharien; Ihwererhe/Nepa Quarters/Nepa Quarters, Eruemkowharien; Ujode Primary School Area & Environs/Ujode Primary School, Ujode
Ughelli North	Evwreni	Ogbodu Street/Ogbodu Hall, Evwreni; Ogbodu/Omokwata/Ogbodu Hall, Evwreni; Uwotie St./Uruekpo St./Uruekpo Hall, Evwreni; Etevie/Uruvwere/Unuarho Ruoren/Ekrameha/Utevie/Adaze/Ekrameha/Ekrameha, Evwreni; Otokpagha/Edjeva Street/Uneni Hall, Evwreni; Unyachigho/Unuarhikrusan/Ayakovwe-Ogaga/Unyarhuen Umeni/Mariere Primary School, Evwreni; Abete/Enyorhovwo Street/Mowoe Primary School, Evwreni; Enurhie Quarters/Enurhie Hall, Unenurhie; Uruwherun Quarters/Urunherun Hall, Unenurhie; Okpawha/Enurhie Hall, Unenurhie
Ughelli North	Uwheru	Enye/Urede Quarters/Uwheru Grammar School, Uwheru; Urede/Oguname/Erh/Igbedi/Uwheru Grammar School, Uwheru; Ehere Hall, Ekremowha/Enyewrole/Uruegbe, Uwheru; Dede Primary Sch Orhuwhurun; Udu Primary School, Uhwovioro Quarters/Urhuvwigbo Quarters, Uwheru I; Udu Primary School, Uhwovioro Quarters/Urhuvwigbo Quarters, Uwheru II; Odja Hall, Ekremowha/Odja Quarters, Uwheru; Odja Hall, Egbo/Uwheru/Odja, Uwheru; Outside Uruvwere/Uruokpokpo/Uruogen/Enyeghagha, Uwheru; Onidjo Primary School, Onidjo Quarters, Uwheru; Onidjo Primary School, Ogbese/Ogbinjor, Uwheru; Egbo Hall, Egbo Quarters, Uwheru; Uruogen/Ogbaka/Ayakovwo Quarters/Egbesinede Primary School, Uwheru; Ogbovo/Uruohworhu/Ohoro Town Hall, Ohoro; Oteka/Ogbevwe/Izeze Primary School, Oteka; Etevie/Enyerukoni/Oruvworo Hall, Etevie; Owarovwo Hall, Owarovwo; Avwon Primary School, Avwon; Uvwriche/Okugbe Primary School, Ogode; Oreba Hall, Oreba; Ophororo Hall, Ophororo
Ughelli North	Agbarho I	Oforhie St./Agbarho Primary School, Agbarho; Ahirima St./Agbarho Primary School, Agbarho; Old Ughelli Road/Agbarho Town Hall, Agbarho; Oviri/Ishere Primary School, Agbarho I; Oviri/Ishere Primary School, Agbarho II; Oviri/Ishere Primary School, Agbarho III; Orhokpokpo O/S, Orhokpokpo; Oghare Town Hall, Oghare; Ohrerhe Primary School, Ohrerhe; Ogimagba St./Ohrerhe Primary School, Ohrerhe; Ogbe Uvwiama/Umutu Primary School, Uvwiama I; Ogbe Uvwiama/Umutu Primary School, Uvwiama II; Ogbe Ophori/Oguname Town Hall, Oguname; Okurikpoehre Primary School, Okurikpehre
Ughelli North	Agbarho II	Odjegba/Ehwerhere/Agbarho Model Primary School, Agbarho; Ughwrughelli/Agbarho Model Primary School, Agbarho; Ughwrughelli II/Agbarho Model Primary School, Agbarho; Onome/Okpalefe/Okpalefe St. Booth; Ophori Road/Grammar School/Agbarho Grammar School, Agbarho; Ogbe Ujevwe Quarters/Erhavwe Primary School, Ekrerhavwe I; Ogbe Ujevwe Quarters/Erhavwe Primary School, Ekrerhavwe II; Urhuvwuogba Street/Emekpe Primary School; Ekpoghwero/Ughrughelli Primary School, Ughrughelli; Uduvwurhobo St./Ehwerhe Primary School, Ehwerhe; Uduvwurhobo St./Ehwerhe Primary School; Urhuvwe/Okan Quarters/Mowarin Primary School I; Urhuvwe/Okan Quarters/Mowarin Primary School II; Mowarin Primary School II
Ughelli South	Ewu I	Egheraka Primary School, Otor - Ewu; Evwerha Hall, Otor - Ewu I; Evwerha Hall, Otor - Ewu II; Emokpor Hall, Otor - Ewu; Ewu Hall, Otor - Ewu; Ohwodo Hall, Otor - Ewu; Ihobe Hall, Otor - Ewu; Abovwe Hall, Otor - Ewu; Ahavwan Hall, Otor - Ewu; Ekrophori Hall, Otor - Ewu; Okale Hall, Okparabe; Imosume Hall, Okparabe; Ofomor Primary School, Okparabe; Ota Hall, Okparabe; Okparabe Health Centre, Okparabe; Ihwre - Okpe Hall, Ihwre - Okpe; Ekrosie Hall, Arhavwarien I; Ekrosie Hall, Arhavwarien II; Iyegbere Hall, Arhavwarien; Uduokoloko Hall, Arhavwarien; Ekritibi Hall, Arhavwarien; Uto-Arhavwarien Primary School, Uto-Arhavwarien I; Uto-Arhavwarien Primary School, Uto-Arhavwarien II; Omafuvwe Town Hall, Omafuvwe; Assah Primary School, Assah I; Assah Primary School, Assah II; Olodiama Primary School, Olodiama; Edjekwo Town Hall, Edjekwo
Ughelli South	Ewu II	Gbaregolor Primary School, Gbaregolor I; Gbaregolor Primary School, Gbaregolor II; Ogberigu Hall, Gbaregolor; Ikise Hall, Gbaregolor; Uduvwukpokpo Hall, Gbaregolor; Odon Hall, Olota; Olota Town Hall, Olota; Onyebru Hall, Orere; Orere Primary School, Orere; Ekade Hall, Orere; Ogoda Town Hall, Ogoda; Ogoda Primary School, Ogoda
Ughelli South	Ewu III	Alagbabri Primary School, Alagbabri; Oyan Primary School, Oyan; Osusurhie Primary School, Osusurhie; Okuama Primary School, Okuama I; Okuama Primary School, Okuama II; Okuama Primary School, Okuama III; Edakori Hall, Okuama; Ekameta Primary School, Ekameta; Ofrukama Primary School, Ofrukama I; Ofrukama Primary School, Ofrukama II; Ofrukama Primary School, Ofrukama III; Omosuomo Primary School, Omosuomo I; Omosuomo Primary School, Omosuomo II; Ighorode Hall, Omosuomo; Dodo Hall, Omosuomo; Orudu Hall, Omosuomo
Ughelli South	Olomu I	Ogoni Town Hall, Ogoni I; Ogoni Town Hall, Ogoni II; Ophori Primary School, Ophori; Ophori Town Hall, Ophori; Okpe Town Hall, Okpe I; Okpe Town Hall, Okpe II; Okpe Town Hall, Okpe III; Agbon Town Hall, Agbon; Etadjakpere Town Hall, Agbon; Okpavuerhe Town Hall, Okpavuerhe; Okpavuerhe Primary School, Okpavuerhe
Ughelli South	Olomu II	Akperhe Primary School, Akperhe I; Akperhe Primary School, Akperhe II; Umolo Primary School, Umolo I; Umolo Primary School, Umolo II; Umolo Town Hall, Umolo; Ovwudokpokpo Primary School, Ovwudokpokpo I; Ovwudokpokpo Primary School, Ovwudokpokpo II; Ovwudokpokpo Primary School, Ovwudokpokpo III; Oviarien Primary School, Oviri-Olomu I; Oviarien Primary School, Oviri-Olomu II; Oviarien Primary School, Oviri-Olomu III; Iniovo Hall, Oviri Olomu; Ikrose Hall, Oviri -Olomu; Aloba Town Hall, Aloba
Ughelli South	Effurun - Otor	Ogun Primary School, Ovwor I; Ogun Primary School, Ovwor II; Ogun Primary School, Ovwor III; Ovwor Town Hall, Ovwor I; Ovwor Town Hall, Ovwor II; Effurun-Otor Town Hall, Effurun-Otor I; Effurun-Otor Town Hall, Effurun-Otor II; Ogbogbo Hall, Effurun - Otor; Oguname Town Hall, Oguname; Etako Primary School, Okpare I; Etako Primary School, Okpare II; Okorogbusu St., Okpare; Okpare Town Hall, Okpare I; Okpare Town Hall, Okpare II
Ughelli South	Ekakpamre	Ekakpamre Grammar School, Ekakpamre I; Ekakpamre Primary School, Ekakpamre II; Ekakpamre Primary School, Ekakpamre III; Ekakpamretown Hall, Ekakpamre; Ekakpamre Market, Ekakpamre; Majovo Primary School, Ekakpamre; Ekrejegbe Play Ground, Ekrejegbe; Ekrokpe Town Hall, Ekrokpe; Ekrokpe Primary School, Ekrokpe; Usiefrun Town Hall, Usiefrun; Ogbavweni Primary School, Usiefrun I; Ogbavweni Primary School, Usiefrun II; Eruoma Hall, Usiefrun; Egbo-Uhurhie Primary School, Egbo-Uhurhie; Egbo-Uhurhie Town Hall, Egbo-Uhurhie; Aragba Primary School, Aragba; Otokutu Primary School, Otokutu I; Otokutu Primary School, Otokutu II; Otokututown Hall, Otokutu I; Otokututown Hall, Otokutu II
Ughelli South	Jeremi I	Iwhrekan Town Hall, Iwharekan; Edjophe Town Hall, Edjophe I; Edjophe Town Hall, Edjophe II; Iwhrekeka Primary School, Iwhrekeka; Ughevwughe Town Hall, Ughevwughe I; Ughevwughe Town Hall, Ughevwughe II; Ughevwughe Primary School, Ughevwughe I; Otor - Edo Town Hall, Otor-Edo; Otor - Edo Primary School, Otor-Edo I; Otor - Edo Primary School, Otor-Edo II; Etabeta Hall, Ihwre - Etabeta; Ughevwughe Primary School, Ughevwughe II
Ughelli South	Jeremi II	Ughievwen Model Primary School, Otu - Jeremi I; Ughievwen Model Primary School, Otu - Jeremi II; Ughievwen Model Primary School, Otu - Jeremi III; Otu - Jeremi Town Hall, Otu - Jeremi; Otu - Jeremi Secondary School, Otu - Jeremi; Eyara Primary School, Eyara; Agbaghara Town Hall, Agbaghara; Agbowhiame Town Hall, Agbowhiame; Erhuwaren Town Hall, Erhuwaren; Imode Primary School, Imode I; Imode Primary School, Imode II; Imode Town Hall, Imode; Oginibo Primary School, Oginibo I; Oginibo Primary School, Oginibo II; Oginibo Town Hall, Oginibo I; Oginibo Town Hall, Oginibo II; Oginibo Grammar School, Oginibo I; Oginibo Grammar School, Oginibo II; Ekrugbobaro, Oginibo; Edeki Hall, Oginibo; Oginibo/Ibateren, Oginibo; Ogbe - Otu, Oginibo; Ihwre - Eti, Oginibo
Ughelli South	Jeremi III	Otor-Okwagbe Town Hall, Otor-Okwagbe; Imigbu Rest House, Otor - Okwagbe; Imigbu Hall, Otor - Okwagbe; Edjavwe Hall, Otor - Okwagbe; Edjarwvwe Hall, Otor-Okwagbe; Idjogun Hall, Okwagbe Waterside; Idjogun Hall II, Okwagbe Waterside; Iviaje Hall Okwagbe Waterside; Akpo I Hall, Okwagbe Waterside; Baba - Ido Primary School, Okwagbe Waterside; Market Square, Okwagbe Waterside
Ughelli South	Jeremi IV	Okwemor Town Hall, Okwemor; Otegbo Town Hall, Otegbo; Egbo - Ide Town Hall, Egbo - Ide I; Egbo - Ide Town Hall, Egbo - Ide II; Abadiama Primary School, Abadiama; Ophorigbala Primary School, Ophorigbala I; Ophorigbala Primary School, Ophorigbala II; Ophorigbala Primary School, Ophorigbala III; Otutuama Primary School, Otutuama; Otutuama Town Hall, Otutuama; Otitiri Town Hall, Otitiri; Esaba Primary School, Esaba; Ohwahwa Primary School, Ohwahwa I; Ohwahwa Primary School, Ohwahwa II; Ohwahwa Primary School, Ohwahwa III; Ihwre-Oku Town Hall, Ihwre - Oku; Obi - Ayagha Town Hall, Obi-Ayagha; Obeni Primary School, Obi-Ayagha
Ukwuani	Umutu	Ugbeleme Primary School, Ogbe - Ogonogo I; Ugbeleme Primary School, Ogbe - Ogonogo II; Ugbeleme Primary School, Ogbe - Ogonogo III; Health Centre Ogbe - Ogonogo; Palmita Health Ogbe - Ogonogo; Ethiope Primary School Ogbe Ogo Nogo/Ukpo I; Ethiope Primary School Ogbe Ogo Nogo/Ukpo II; Ethiope Primary School Ogbe Ogo Nogo/Ukpo III; Ethiope Primary School Ogbogonogo/Ukpo; Igili Primary School, Iyokogbe I; Igili Primary School, Iyokogbe II; Igili Primary School, Iyokogbe III; Igili Primary School, Iyokogbe IV; Igili Primary School, Iyokogbe V
Ukwuani	Akoku	Obodo - Orji Primary School Akoku - Uno I; Obodo - Orji Primary School Akoku - Uno II; Obodo - Orji Primary School Akoku - Uno III; Obi - Ogwa Akoku - Uno I; Obi - Ogwa Akoku - Uno II; Obi - Ogwa Akoku - Uno III; Onyia Primary School Umuaja I; Onyia Primary School Umuaja II; Onyia Primary School Umuaja III; Onyia Primary School Umuaja IV; Onyia Primary School Umuaja V; Onyia Primary School Umuaja VI; Elite Primary School Obi - Obeti I; Elite Primary School Obi - Obeti II; Elite Primary School Obi - Obeti III; Elite Primary School Obi - Obeti IV; Postal Agency Obi - Obeti I; Postal Agency Obi - Obeti II; Postal Agency Obi - Obeti III
Ukwuani	Ebedei	Ekpimili Primary School Obi-Ogene; Ebedei Primary School Adonishaka; Obi - Ogwa Adonishaka; Town Hall Obi - Iloh; Obiogwa Obi-Ukwuole; Town Hall Umunyalum; Obi - Ogwa Umueziogoli; Umueziogoli Primary School Umueziogoli; Obiogwa Issemelu/Oge - Uzu; Ebedei Primary School Umunyalum
Ukwuani	Umukwata	Ukwata Primary School Umu - Ngbolobia/Ogbe-Ofu I; Ukwata Primary School Umu - Ngbolobia/Ogbe-Ofu II; Ukwata Primary School Umu - Ngbolobia/Ogbe-Ofu III; Ukwata Primary School Obinomba I; Ukwata Primary School Obinomba II; Ukwata Primary School Ogbe-Utagba/Umuedem; Ukwata Primary School Umu-Okpa/Okpane Gbunu; Obi - Igbo Town Hall Obi-Igbo; Obi - Oma Primary School Owa - Abbi I; Obi - Oma Primary School Owa - Abbi II; Obi - Oma Primary School Owa - Abbi III; Obi - Oma Primary School Owa - Abbi IV; Obi - Ogwa Hall Obi-Onyonyunicha; Obi - Ogwa Hall Obi-Oluku
Ukwuani	Eziokpor	Akashiede Primary School Umuoshi; Akashiede Primary School Eziokpor-Uno; Akashiede Primary School Eziokpor-Obi I; Akashiede Primary School Eziokpor-Obi II; Obi Ogo Eziokpor-Obi; Obi Ogwa Eziokpor-Obi
Ukwuani	Amai	Igwete Primary School Umu-Gbanuche I; Igwete Primary School Umu-Gbanuche II; Igwete Primary School Umu-Agbo I; Igwete Primary School Umu-Agbo II; Igwete Primary School Umu-Iseh; Igwete Primary School Ogbe-Anagba/Oteh/Iku; Umubu Olile Umubu; Ekum Primary School Umu/Deh/Akalibo; Ekum Primary School Umuokochi/Isama; Nge Primary School Umu-Ugbo; Council Hall Ogbe Awo/Okpala; Council Hall Ogbe Awo; Obi-Ogwa Okochi/Akalibo; Obi-Ogwa Umumukwu; Post Office Ogbe Iku/Uku I; Post Office Ogbe Iku/Uku II
Ukwuani	Ezionum	Ezhie Primary School Ogbe-Uku/Odolu; Ezhie Primary School Ogbe-Asaba/Ejeme; Ezhie Primary School Ogbe-Odolu/Uku; Ogwa-Ogbe Ofu Akalawai/Ogbemili/Olile/Akalawa; Ezhie Primary School I Uzomuma/Azu Ogwa; Ezhie Primary School I Ogbenami I; Ezhie Primary School I Ogbenami II; Court Hall Ogbeite I; Court Hall Ogbeite II; Court Hall Ogbeite III
Ukwuani	Umuebu	Ebu Primary School Ogbe - Iso; Ebu Primary School Umugbo; Ebu Primary School Ogbe Ofu; Ebu Primary School Ogbe Onyia; Ebu Primary School Osamele; Ebu Primary School Amalama I; Ebu Primary School Amalama II
Ukwuani	Obiaruku I	Morka Primary School Ogbe Obiaruku I; Morka Primary School Ogbe Obiaruku II; Morka Primary School Ghana Quarters I; Morka Primary School Ghana Quarters II; Morka Primary School Onyuku St. I; Morka Primary School Onyuku St. II; Morka Primary School Ogbe - Ofu; Morka Primary School Ekeruche St.; Morka Primary School Umu Ebu Road; Morka Primary School Hospital Road; Ethiope Primary School Ogbe- Aka I; Ethiope Primary School Ogbe- Aka II; Ethiope Primary School Ogbe- Aka III; Ethiope Primary School Ogbe- Aka IV; Ethiope Primary School Ogbe- Aka V
Ukwuani	Obiaruku II	Obiaruku II Emeni Primary School I; Obiaruku II Emeni Primary School II; Obiaruku II Emeni Primary School III; Obiaruku II Emeni Primary School IV; Obiaruku II Emeni Primary School V; Obiaruku II Emeni Primary School VI; Obiaruku II Esume Uku Primary School I; Obiaruku II Esume Uku Primary School II; Obiaruku II Esume Uku Primary School III; Obiaruku II Esume Uku Primary School IV; Obiaruku II Obi - Ogwa Ugbe I; Obiaruku II Obi - Ogwa Ugbe II; Obiaruku II Obi - Ogwa Okuzu I; Obiaruku II Obi - Ogwa Okuzu II; Obiaruku II Obiaruku Grammar School I; Obiaruku II Obiaruku Grammar School II
Uvwie	Effurun I	Customary Court P. T. I Road; Ovie Palace Road By P. T. I. Junction; P. T. I. Quarters By Maintenance Department; Opp. Palace Gate; Alegbo Primary School Alebo Area; Alegbo Primary School; Igbo Hall Alaka; Udumurie; By Post Office; By Ekpan Park Along Jakpa Road; Okito Road Junction; Along Alaka St.; Jefia Avenue; Okoloba By Nepa; Izobo Layout Off Ovie Palace Road; Jakpa Road By Effurun Clinic I; Odin College; Odumurugbo Effurun; By Asheshe Off Jakpa Road; Jakpa Road By Effurun Clinic II
Uvwie	Effurun II	Angle 90 Motor Park; Agric Junction Urhumarho; Eki - Oto I; Eki - Oto II; Okubor/Bright St. Hotel De Mark; Ogbe Primary School I; Ogbe Primary School II; Our Lady's High School I; Our Lady's High School II; Water Resources I; Water Resources II; Esedo Primary School I; Esedo Primary School II
Uvwie	Enerhen I	Agaga Layout; By Land & Survey Oil Field Road; Aballa Lane; Beside Coca-Cola, Odibo Avenue; Urhobo College, Kingsway Area; Urhobo College; Esievo Lane; Opp. N. N. B.; Beside Geosite Survey; Beside Whassan Hotel; By Agaga Layout
Uvwie	Enerhen II	Town Hall, Enerhen Town I; Town Hall, Enerhen Town II; By Jefia Estate; Enerhen By Mosheshe; Enerhen By Police Station; By Atamakolomi Udu Bridge Area; By Atamakolomi; Kolokolo By Uruabe; Kolokolo Before Roundabout; Sedeco By Udi Lane; By Aramakolomi
Uvwie	Ugborikoko	By Mosheshe Airport Road & Environs; Eyabuobe Primary School; By Custom Barrack; By Shrine Ugborikoko Town; Opp. C. A. C Church Ojomo Avenue; By Dpa Ugborikoko Estate; By Atamakolomi I; Kpoharho Estate; By Ugborikoko Market; Sokoh Estate Road; By Atamakolomi II; Delta Estate By Phd; Kodosoh Layout; Ugborikoko Layout; Opp. C. A. C Church; By Fr Obioe St.
Uvwie	Ugboroke	Ugboroke Town Ugboroke; By Market Square; College Of Education Demon School I; College Of Education Demon School II; By Ovonomo St. Junction; Udu - Ufuoma St.; By Ugono Lane; Umar Village Square I; Umar Village Square II; Bright Hope By Cele Church; Ugboroke Town
Uvwie	Ugbomro/Ugbolokposo	Ugbomro Town Hall; Ugbomro Primary School; By Spare Parts Market; Ebrumede; Udumurhie; Ugbomochori/Garki; Iteregbi; Okwuatata; Ugbolokposo Village
Uvwie	Army Barracks Area	By Army Day Primary School; By Mechanic Village Maroko; Market Square Mammy Market; By P. T. I. Estate; By Port Harcourt Motor Park; By Adidi St. Refinery Road; Beside People's Club; Ohorhei Primary School; Ohorhe II Town; Aka Avenue By Nnewi Junction I; Aka Avenue By Nnewi Junction II
Uvwie	Ekpan I	By Saipem Camp Nnpc Refinery; By Nnpc Primary School I; By Nnpc Primary School II; By Shagholor Primary School Police Barrack; By Police Barrack Junction; By Edo Guest House Osuben Area; By Niger Cat Agbinogbovwan; Village Square Okweoyanike; By Catholic Church Nnpc Housing Estate; By Catholic Church
Uvwie	Ekpan II	By Udumuloho Ekpan; By Ubrete; Village Square Ekpan; Udumuophori Primary School I; Udumuophori Primary School II; Ekpan Town Hall; Market Square; Hospital; Beside Kenwood Hotel; Ekpan Secondary School; Udumuoto; Udumuevwara
Warri North	Ogheye	Afiakpa Primary School, Ekekporo I; Afiakpa Primary School, Ekekporo II; Ugbeni Primary School, Ogheye I; Ugbeni Primary School, Ogheye II; Ugo Goegin Town Hall, Ugogoegin I; Ugo Goegin Town Hall, Ugogoegin II; Edonsa Primary School, Ehoreke I; Edonsa Primary School, Ehoreke II; Edonsa Primary School, Ehoreke III; Edonsa Primary School, Ehoreke IV; Uwangwe Primary School, Jakpa I; Uwangwe Primary School, Jakpa II; Council Dispensary, Jakpa I; Council Dispensary, Jakpa II; Daleakata Town Hall I; Daleakata Town Hall II; Etseyiotoren Primary School, Ebokiti I; Etseyiotoren Primary School, Ebokiti II; Etseyiotoren Primary School, Ebokiti III; Utonlita Town Hall I; Utonlita Town Hall II; Ewoleba Town Hall, Ewoleba I; Ewoleba Town Hall, Ewoleba II; Oton Oluetseoye Primary School, Ugbege I; Oton Oluetseoye Primary School, Ugbege II
Warri North	Gbokoda	Ajamita Town Hall, Ajamita I; Ajamita Town Hall, Ajamita II; Ajamita Town Hall, Ajamita III; Tebu Town Hall, Tebu I; Tebu Town Hall, Tebu II; Tebu Town Hall, Tebu III; Udo Town Hall, Udo I; Udo Town Hall, Udo II; Diare Primary School, Gbokoda I; Ginuwa Grammar School Gbokoda II
Warri North	Ebrohimi	Dudu Primary School, Obontie Ghanreda I; Dudu Primary School, Obontie Ghanreda II; Dudu Primary School, Obontie Ghanreda III; Dudu Primary School, Obontie Ghanreda IV; Olomu Primary School, Ebrohimi I; Olomu Primary School, Ebrohimi II; Olomu Primary School, Ebrohimi III; Ebrohimi Town Hall, Ebrohimi; Ureju Primary School, Ureju I; Ureju Primary School, Ureju II; Ureju Primary School, Ureju III; Ugbenyen Town Hall, Ugbenyen; Edo Primary School, Obaghoro I; Edo Primary School, Obaghoro II; Edo Primary School, Obaghoro III; Edo Primary School, Obaghoro IV; Olumagada Town Hall, Olumagada
Warri North	Eghoro	Beresibe Primary School Beresibe; Abokwa Primary School Eghoro I; Abokwa Primary School Eghoro II; Abokwa Primary School Eghoro III; Oturun Primary School Kolokolo I; Oturun Primary School Kolokolo II; Oturun Primary School Kolokolo III; Udefi Primary School Tisum I; Udefi Primary School Tisum II; Sahara - Tie Town Hall, Sahara-Tie; Ureju - Sin - Sin Town Hall I; Ureju - Sin - Sin Town Hall II; Ureju - Sin - Sin Town Hall III
Warri North	Koko I	Akuarajor Primary School Koko Beach I; Akuarajor Primary School Koko Beach II; Akuarajor Primary School Koko Beach III; Iwere College, Koko Town I; Iwere College, Koko Town II; Iwere College, Koko Town III; Iwere College, Koko Town IV; General Hospital Koko; Ajagbo Gbo Town, Ajagbogbo; Korobe Town, Korobe I; Korobe Town, Korobe II; Korobe Town, Korobe III; Aja Olugbeti Town I; Aja Olugbeti Town II; Ubafue Town; Ubiro/Oregun Town
Warri North	Koko II	Umeugbe Primary School, Abegberodo I; Umeugbe Primary School, Abegberodo II; Umeugbe Primary School, Abegberodo III; Umeugbe Primary School, Abegberodo IV; Ajagbodudu Primary School, Ajagbodudu; Ikengbuwa Primary School, Ubagboro; Obitugbo Town; Okogho Town; Ajagbodudu Primary School II
Warri North	Opuama (Egbema I)	Azamazion Primary School, Azamazion I; Azamazion Primary School, Azamazion II; Ikpotogbene Primary School, Ikpotogbene; Ikpotogbene Town; Oloduwa Primary School, Opuama I; Oloduwa Primary School, Opuama II; Oloduwa Primary School, Opuama III; Oloduwa Primary School, Opuama IV
Warri North	Tsekelewu (Egbema II)	Miyen Primary School, Tsekelewu I; Miyen Primary School, Tsekelewu II; Miyen Primary School, Tsekelewu III; Kabe Primary School, Tsekelewu I; Kabe Primary School, Tsekelewu II; Wobomene Primary School, Wobomene I; Wobomene Primary School, Wobomene II
Warri North	Ogbinbiri (Egbema III)	Ogeduba Town Hall, Ogeduba I; Ogeduba Town Hall, Ogeduba II; Lagos Junction Primary School, Lagos Junction; Egbema Primary School, Ogbinbiri I; Egbema Primary School, Ogbinbiri II; Timi Primary School, Idebagbene I; Timi Primary School, Idebagbene II; Timi Primary School, Idebagbene III
Warri North	Ogbudugbudu (Egbema IV)	Abadigbene Primary School, Abadigbene I; Abadigbene Primary School, Abadigbene II; Utolu Primary School, Ogbudugbudu I; Utolu Primary School, Ogbudugbudu II; Utolu Primary School, Ogbudugbudu III; Okifamba Primary School, Okifamba
Warri South	Obodo/Omadino	Obodo Town Hall, Obodo I; Obodo Town Hall, Obodo II; Orere Primary School, Orere; Oteghele Primary School, Oteghele; Ukpokiti Town Hall, Ukpokiti; Jelu Primary School, Omadino; Esugbo Town Hall, Esugbo; Ogua Town Hall, Ogua; Aghigho Town Hall, Aghigho; Aja-Osolo Town Hall, Aja-Osolo; Ugboritse Duwa Town Hall, Ugboritse Duwa; Obi - Koko Town Hall, Obi-Koko; Ijala -Tie Town Hall, Ijala - Tie; Ubeji Primary School, Ubeji I; Ubeji Primary School, Ubeji II; Ifie-Kporo Town Hall, Ifie-Kporo I; Ifie-Kporo Town Hall, Ifie-Kporo II; Egbokodo Town Hall, Egbokodo
Warri South	Ode-Itsekiri	Iginuwa Primary School, Ode-Itsekiri I; Iginuwa Primary School, Ode-Itsekiri II; Oroke Town Hall, Ode-Itsekiri; Orugbo Town Hall, Orugbo; Orugbo Postal Agency, Orugbo; Inorin Town Hall, Inorin; Orugbo Primary School, Orugbo I; Orugbo Primary School, Orugbo II; Usele Town Hall, Usele; Ugbodede Town Hall, Ugbodede; Ajiba Town Hall Ajiba; Ubeurure Town Hall, Ubeurure; Postal Agency, River Villa; Aja Deodiare Town Hall, Aja Deodiare
Warri South	Ogunu/Ekurede-Urhobo	Ogunu Primary School, Ogunu I; Ogunu Primary School, Ogunu II; Ogunu / Ekurede-Urhobo; Shell Gate, Ogunu I; Shell Gate, Ogunu II; Ekurede Town Hall, Ekurede-Urhobo I; Ekurede Town Hall, Ekurede-Urhobo II; Ekurede Town Hall, Ekurede-Urhobo III; Ekurede Town Hall, Ekurede-Urhobo IV; Court Four, Ekurede-Urhobo I; Court Four, Ekurede-Urhobo II; Federal Government College Ogunu I; Federal Government College Ogunu II; Ogunu Town Hall, Ogunu I; Ogunu Town Hall, Ogunu II
Warri South	Ugbuwangue/Ekurede-Itsekiri	Yonwuren College, Ugbuwangue I; Yonwuren College, Ugbuwangue II; Agbaje Primary School, Ugbuwangue; Ugbuwangue/Ekurede Itsekiri; Ogiamen Primary School, Ekurede-Itsekiri II; Ogiamen Primary School, Ekurede-Itsekiri III; Ogiamen Primary School, Ekurede-Itsekiri IV; Ekurede Town Hall, Ekurede-Itsekiri I; Ekurede Town Hall, Ekurede-Itsekiri II; Main Gate, N. P. A.; Ewolufu Town Hall, Ugbori; Ajamogha Town Hall, Ajamogha I; Ajamogha Town Hall, Ajamogha II; Customary Court, Agbejule & Environ I; Customary Court, Agbejule & Environ II
Warri South	G. R. A.	Peace Primary School, General Hospital & Police Hqrs I; Peace Primary School, General Hospital & Police Hqrs II; Nana College, School Road & Environ I; Nana College, School Road & Environ II; Igini Primary School, Esisi Road; Ministry Of Education, Delta Boat Yard & Naval Base; Dogho Primary School, Okere Road I; Dogho Primary School, Okere Road II; Mowoe Primary School, Robert Road I; Mowoe Primary School, Robert Road II; Mowoe Primary School, Robert Road III; Uku Town Hall, Uku Square Area; Idimi Jakpa Town Hall, Idimi Jakpa Area I; Idimi Jakpa Town Hall, Idimi Jakpa Area II; Mileer Water Side, Marina Police Area
Warri South	Bowen	Omatsola Primary School, Odion Road I; Omatsola Primary School, Odion Road II; Aldes Town Primary School, Ijaw Street I; Aldes Town Primary School, Ijaw Street II; Aldes Town Primary School, Ijaw Street III; Cavagina Primary School, Odion Road I; Cavagina Primary School, Odion Road II; Rubber Plantation, Cemetery Road, (Right) I; Rubber Plantation, Cemetery Road, (Right) II; Sport Council, Cemetery Road, (Right); Council Dispensary, Odion Road I; Council Dispensary, Odion Road II; Dore Numa College, Ijaw Street; Edion Town Hall, Agbasa I; Edion Town Hall, Agbasa II; Edion Town Hall, Agbasa III
Warri South	Pessu	I. C. E., Pessu Side Of Odion Road I; I. C. E., Pessu Side Of Odion Road II; Pessu Market Garage, Pessu Market I; Pessu Market Garage, Pessu Market II; Wilikie By James St, Pessu Side Of Odion I; Wilikie By James St, Pessu Side Of Odion II; Postal Agency, Pessu Market Side I; Postal Agency, Pessu Market Side II; New Rex Complex, Area Opposite Police Station; Pessu Town Hall, Saw Mill Area I; Pessu Town Hall, Saw Mill Area II; Ikpara Water Side, Ikpara Layout I; Ikpara Water Side, Ikpara Layout II; Ogbe Ijoh Trans Hall, Ogbe Ijoh Market I; Ogbe Ijoh Trans Hall, Ogbe Ijoh Market II
Warri South	Okere	Ojojo Primary School, Warri/Sapele Road I; Ojojo Primary School, Warri/Sapele Road II; Erejuwa Play Ground, Lower Erejuwa I; Erejuwa Play Ground, Lower Erejuwa II; Uwangue College, Robert Road; Veterinary Premises, Veterinary Area I; Veterinary Premises, Veterinary Area II; Torufa Primary School, Okere Road I; Torufa Primary School, Okere Road II; Enemejuwa St By No 18, Enemejuwa; Council Quarters, Yoruba Road; Agbasa Primary School, Agbasa I; Agbasa Primary School, Agbasa II; Agbasa Primary School, Agbasa III; Hussey College, Hussey College Area
Warri South	Igbudu	Numa Maternity Gate, Igbudu I; Numa Maternity Gate, Igbudu II; Igbudu Primary School, Marine Gate I; Igbudu Primary School, Marine Gate II; D. B. S. Premises, Bazunu; College Of Commerce, Igbudu I; College Of Commerce, Igbudu II; Igbudu Town Hall, Igbudu; Essi College, Macdemott Warri; Merogun Primary School, Merogun I; Merogun Primary School, Merogun II; Ogbedengbe Primary School, Ogbedengbe Street I; Ogbedengbe Primary School, Ogbedengbe Street II; Ogbedengbe Square, Iyare I; Ogbedengbe Square, Iyare II; Step Forward Nursery School, D. D. P. A. Area; Area Near Arabic Centre, Hausa Quarters
Warri South	Edjeba	Edjeba Primary School, Edjeba I; Edjeba Primary School, Edjeba II; Otien Hall, Edjeba I; Otien Hall, Edjeba II; Ikpuri Hall, Edjeba I; Ikpuri Hall, Edjeba II; Agbamu Hall, Edjeba I; Agbamu Hall, Edjeba II; Idama Farm Gate, Edjeba I; Idama Farm Gate, Edjeba II; Step Forward Secondary School, Edjeba I; Step Forward Secondary School, Edjeba II; Shell Main Gate, Shell Edjeba I; Shell Main Gate, Shell Edjeba II; College Of Education, College Compound, Edjeba
Warri South	Okumagba I	Ogwa Olodi, Okumagba Layout I; Ogwa Olodi, Okumagba Layout II; Ogwa Olodi, Okumagba Layout III; Tipper Garage Area, Okumagba Layout; Omatsone Square, Okumagba Layout I; Omatsone Square, Okumagba Layout II; Omatsone Square, Okumagba Layout III; Ikegbuwa Primary School, Okumagba Layout I; Ikegbuwa Primary School, Okumagba Layout II; Ikegbuwa Primary School, Okumagba Layout III; Luminary School, Okumagba Layout; Giddel National School, Giwa Amu Area Okumagba Layout; Progress School, Giwa Amu Area Okumagba Layout; School By God's Grace Ministry, Arubaye Area, Okumagba Layout
Warri South	Okumagba II	Olodi Primary School, Okumagba Avenue I; Olodi Primary School, Okumagba Avenue II; Cinema Site, Okumagba Avenue; By Frank Alimen Premises, Okumagba Avenue; Ighogbadu Primary School, Ighogbadu I; Ighogbadu Primary School, Ighogbadu II; Ighogbadu Primary School, Ighogbadu III; Ejemudaro By Cinema, Okumagba Layout I; Ejemudaro By Cinema, Okumagba Layout II; St. George's Clinic, Ighogbadu By Right; Sitto Primary School, Ighogbadu By Right; Emebiren By Eyeson, Avenue Area; Okumagba Estate, By Avenue Police Station I; Okumagba Estate, By Avenue Police Station II
Warri South West	Ogbe - Ijoh	Ogbe - Ijoh Primary School; Ikiandumu Play-Ground; Lotiebiri; Ogbe - Ijoh Court Hall; Ikensiebokorogha Town Hall; Odogboro Town Hall; Toweigbene Town Hall; Odegbene Town Hall; Adu Town Hall; Nifor Town Hall; Orupa Town Hall; Dosumor Town Hall; Izansa Town Hall; Ijelejele Town Hall; Enigbogbene Town Hall; Takemebogbene Town Hall; Torufa Gbene Town Hall; Diebiri Town Hall; Eferesougbene Town Hall; Ikeremor Primary School; Batan Town Hall; Odidi Town Hall; Bomobulou; Lokiri Town Hall I; Lokiri Town Hall II
Warri South West	Isaba	Isaba Primary School; Isaba Town Hall; Isaba Secondary School; Gbonweigvene Town Hall; Orubeke Town Hall; Tuboama Town Hall; Peretugbene Town Hall I; Peretugbene Town Hall II
Warri South West	Oporoza	Oporoza Primary School; Opuede New Jerusalem; Opuedebudo Primary School; Ubabiri Town Hall; Uburu Town Hall; Tebujor Town Hall; Ikoko Town Hall; Okpele-Ama Primary School I; Okpel-Ama Primary School II
Warri South West	Gbaramatu	Masaja Town Hall`; Mosayiaghan Town Hall; Kantu Town Hall; Okpomi Town Hall; Saniye Town Hall; Kunukunuma Primary School; Kurutie Primary School; Azama Play Ground; Inikorogha Town Hall; Kokodiagbene Primary School; Benikrukru Town Hall; Okerenkoko Primary School; Bibopere Primary School; Pepe - Ama Town Hall; Olobio Gbene Town Hall; Kokodiagbene Town Hall; Egwa Town Hall; Benikrukru Primary School; Okerenkoko Town Hall; Adakagbene Town Hall; Ikangbene Town Hall I; Ikangbene Town Hall II
Warri South West	Ugborodo	Arunton Quarters I; Arunton Quarters II; Arunton Quarters III; Ikpere Primary School I; Ikpere Primary School II; Ikpere Primary School III; Ikpere Primary School IV; Costain Quarters I; Costain Quarters II; Costain Quarters III; Gbonweigvene Town Hall; Ugborodo Town Hall I; Ugborodo Town Hall II; Ugborodo Town Hall III; Ugborodo Town Hall IV; Olote Ugbegu I; Olote Ugbegu II; Eyiugba Quarters; Canal Quarters I; Canal Quarters II; Ugbegin Quarters; Ugbegungun Primary School I; Ugbegungun Primary School II; Ugbegungun Primary School III; Ugbegungun Primary School IV; Ugbegungun Primary School V; Ugbegungun Primary School VI; Ubaegbele Meji Quarters I; Ubaegbele Meji Quarters II; Ubaegbele Meji Quarters III; Ubaegbele Meji Quarters IV; Ubaegbele Meji Quarters V; Ubaegbele Meji Quarters VI; Ubaegbele Meji Quarters VII; Ubaegbele Meji Quarters VIII; Ugbegungun Town Hall I; Ugbegungun Town Hall II; Ugbegungun Town Hall III; Otumara I; Otumara II; Otumara III; Aja - Ufo I; Aja - Ufo II; Saghara I; Saghara II; Saghara III; Saghara IV; Saghara V
Warri South West	Akpikpa	Ogogoro Quarters; Akonu Quarters I; Akonu Quarters II; Akonu Quarters III; Ogu - Ajakpakpa; Omumu Quarters; Etiorubu Quarters I; Etiorubu Quarters II; Omumu Quarters II
Warri South West	Madangho	Ijaghala Town Hall I; Ijaghala Town Hall II; Kpokpo Town Hall I; Kpokpo Town Hall II; Madangho I; Madangho II; Asakpi Quarters; Dispensary Hall; Edah Primary School I; Edah Primary School II; Edah Primary School III; Edah Primary School IV; Aja Okoturo I; Aja Okoturo II; Toristsemotse Quarters
Warri South West	Orere	Bateren Primary School I; Bateren Primary School II; Bateren Primary School III; Bateren Primary School IV; Tselu Town Hall I; Tselu Town Hall II; Obiaja Gbasan Town Hall; Utonyibo Town Hall I; Utonyibo Town Hall II; Bobi Primary School I; Bobi Primary School II; Bobi Primary School III; Olobe Town Hall I; Olobe Town Hall II; Baterentie Town Hall; Orubu Town Hall I; Orubu Town Hall II; Orere Iye Primary School I; Orere Iye Primary School II; Orere Iye Primary School III; Zion I; Zion II; Yanagho Iye Primary School; Ajusobo I; Ajusobo II; Ajakpotoken; Sumuge I; Sumuge II; Agogboro Primary School I; Agogboro Primary School II; Agogboro Primary School III; Agokutu; Deghele Iye Primary School I; Deghele Iye Primary School II; Deghele Iye Primary School III; Ajumo Town Hall I; Ajumo Town Hall II; Kokoyo Town Hall I; Kokoyo Town Hall II; Gbogbodu Town Hall I; Gbogbodu Town Hall II; Taku La Town Hall I; Taku La Town Hall II; Ugbo Rigora; Ubi - Mango I; Ubi - Mango II
Warri South West	Aja - Udaibo	Asumbo Town Hall I; Asumbo Town Hall II; Ajudaibo Primary School I; Ajudaibo Primary School II; Obitebon Quarters I; Obitebon Quarters II; Okegbe Quarters I; Okegbe Quarters II; Oguaja Quarters; Emami Quarters I; Emami Quarters II
Warri South West	Ogidigben	Light House; Ogidigben Town Hall I; Ogidigben Town Hall II; Ogidigben Town Hall III; Omaretine Primary School I; Omaretine Primary School II; Egbeokuta; Ajatsosi Quarters I; Ajatsosi Quarters II; Ajatsosi Quarters III; Elesanmi Quarters I; Elesanmi Quarters II; Elesanmi Quarters III
