= Isoko region =

Region of Delta State, Nigeria

Isoko is a region of Delta State and Bayelsa in southern Nigeria and is inhabited by an ethnic group of the same name, the Isoko people. The region is divided into two Local Government Areas, Isoko North (headquartered at Ozoro) and Isoko South (headquartered at Oleh).

== History ==
The Isoko community is commonly known for farming, fishing and the production of palm oil and kernels. This region used to be a part of the defunct "Mid-West Region". It later became part of Bendel State, before Bendel State was split to form Edo and Delta states. The ancestors of Isoko are Orowa, Upke, and Izo. They were the first set that came from Benin to settle in Delta.

== Geography and climate ==
=== Location ===
The Isoko region is located in Delta State of modern Nigeria.

=== Local climatic conditions ===
Isoko region is in the tropical rain forest area of the Niger-delta. The region experiences high rainfall and high humidity most of the year. The climate is equatorial and is marked by two distinct seasons. the dry and rainy seasons. The dry season lasts from about November to April and is significantly marked by the cool "harmarttan" dusty haze from the north-east winds. The rainy season spans May to October with a brief dry spell in August.

=== Towns in Isoko ===
Some major towns in Isoko region are:

- Aradhe
- Araya
- Aviara
- Bethel
- Ekiugbo-Iyede
- Ellu
- Emede
- Emevor
- Enhwe
- Erowa
- Ibrede
- Idheze
- Igbide
- Igbuku
- Irri
- Itebiege
- Ivori
- Ivrogbo
- Oghara-Iyede
- Oghenerurie-Iyede
- Iyede-Ame
- Ofagbe
- Okpe Isoko
- Oleh
- Olomoro
- Onogboko
- Orie
- Otor-Owhe
- Ovrode
- Owhe
- Owhelogbo
- Otigho
- Oyede
- Ozoro
- Umeh
- Uro
- Utue
- Uzere
- Erawha

== Economy ==
The main economic activity is food crop farming. And the staple food crops include cassava and yams. There is also the widespread production of palm oil and palm kernels. Limited amount of hunting and fishing is also done. Women form a large proportion of the farming population. They also engage in trade of food crops for cash to meet other basic household needs. On market days, it is common to see Isoko women peddling their assorted goods around neighboring villages.

Cassava is the source of most of the foods consumed by the Isoko people. Garri, starch meal (Ozi), Egu are cassava derivatives.

Food crop production has been declining rapidly recently. This has been largely attributed to soil damage resulting from frequent crude oil spills from pipelines belonging to some of the major oil producing companies (including Shell Petroleum Development Company (SPDC), whose pipeline network transverse the landscape). This has led to large-scale frustrations with Shell Petroleum Development Company, and has resulted in skirmishes and, recently, kidnappings for ransom in some neighboring communities.

== Demographics ==
There is no definitive population census figure on the region of Isoko and, indeed, most of Nigeria. The various Nigerian census figures have been controversial and are deemed unsupportable.

== Religion ==
The Isoko people are predominantly Christians such as the late Evangelist Cornelius Adam Igbudu who founded the Anglican Adam Preaching Society. Traditional worship still thrives despite the strong onslaught of Christian principles. "Ọghẹnẹ" is the word for God. Although it can be generally termed as traditional religion, there are however some practices that are peculiar to some Isoko community. For instance in the town of Emevor, some important festivals like "Idhu and Owhoru" which are celebrated annually and biannually.

== Transport ==
Popular mode of transport is the motorcycle and bicycle. Inter-city travel is by bus or car.

== Education ==
The Isoko Region is a home to Delta State University, - popularly known as Oleh Campus - it is a State government owned university in Nigeria with the main campus located at Abraka. The Oleh campus was established with the 1995 Amended Edict. The university houses the Faculty of law and Faculty of Engineering.

Isoko Region is also a home to The Southern Delta University (formerly a State Polytechnic) Ozoro, it was one of the three polytechnics in Delta State, Nigeria. The university offers Degrees, National Diplomas and Higher National Diplomas in courses of Science, Social science and Art.

There are also Several secondary schools and postsecondary schools in the region. The Isoko people know the value of education and encourage their young ones to attend school. The Isoko people have been known to be very passionate about location of education infrastructure in their communities, believing it is a mark of progress.

Early emphasis was on teacher-training schools and this led to a glut of teachers in the community. This is rapidly changing as opportunities offered by other professions are recognized.

Major post-primary educational institutions in the region include Notre Dame College, Ozoro; James Welch Grammar School [Best school in the Isoko land], Emevor; Saint Joseph's Teacher's College, Ozoro; Saint Michael's College Oleh; Anglican Grammar School, Ozoro, Ofagbe Technical College, Ofagbe, and several more. Post-secondary schools include a campus of the Delta State University at Oleh and the Delta State Polytechnic at Ozoro.
