= Irri =

- Location within Nigeria
- Coordinates: 5°44′N 6°21′E
- Country: Nigeria
- State: Delta State
- LGA: Isoko South
- Founder: Omo-ode
- Time zone: UTC+1 (WAT (UTC+1))

Irri is located in the Isoko South local government area of Delta state, Nigeria. It is one of the petroleum producing communities in Nigeria. It is bordered by Uzere, Aviara, Oyede, Idheze and Oleh. Descendants of Irri migrated to form other small villages and towns, such like Ada, Idheze, Ikpide, Ivrogbo, Iwreogboko, Canaan Irri, Ivori, Uro Irri, etc, and they are usually referred to as children of Irri Kingdom. The people are referred to as Emo Irri, which means children of Irri.

== History ==
According to Professor Obaro Ikime, Irri is also referred to as Erhivwi. Its etymology which has been passed down through oral tale for generations states that, the founding father of Irri is Omo-Ode, whose name is given to one of the oldest primary schools in the community. It is believed that the people of Irri can trace their origins to the Benin Kingdom. The early settlers originally migrated from the Kingdom of Benin to Uzere and later migrated from Uzere to form what is now called Irri.

== Economy ==
The Irri people have been known to be farmers and fishers for generations, whose major farm produce are cassava and palm oil. More recently, many of its people have become educationists.

== Traditional Government ==
The Odio-Ologbo or Odiologbo, which means High Chief, is the ruler of Irri. The community has no Ovie (king).

== Religion ==
Irri people are majorly Christians of Anglican, Catholic, Protestant, Jehovah Witness denominations, with a very small number of individuals still practising traditional beliefs.
