= List of tertiary institutions in Delta State =

Educational institutions in Delta State, Nigeria

Delta State is one of the 37 states of Nigeria including the FCT with Asaba as the state capital. This list of tertiary institutions in Delta State includes universities, polytechnics and colleges that are owned by Federal Government, State Government and some private individuals.

== Universities ==
- Federal University of Petroleum Resources Effurun
- Delta State University, Abraka
- Delta State University of Science and Technology, Ozoro
- Dennis Osadebay University, Asaba
- University of Delta, Agbor
- Western Delta University, Oghara
- Novena University, Ogume-Amai
- Michael and Cecilia Ibru University, Ibru Village, Ughelli
- National Open University of Nigeria (three study centres, one at Asaba, one at Emevor and another at Owhrode).
- Edwin Clark University, Kiagbodo
- Eagle Heights University, Omadino, Warri
- Admiralty University of Nigeria at Ibusa and Sapele

== Polytechnics ==
- Federal Polytechnic, Orogun.
- Bellmark Polytechnic, Kwale.
- Calvary Polytechnic, Owa-Oyibo, Delta State
- Delta State Polytechnic, Ogwashi-Uku
- Delta State Polytechnic, Otefe, Oghara.
- Delta State School of Marine Technology, Burutu.
- Delta State College Of Health Technology, Ofuoma
- Petroleum Training Institute, Effurun
- Conarina maritime academy (Oria, Abraka)
- Delta Central Polytechnic Ekiugbo Ughelli DECCOMBA

== Colleges ==
- Federal College of Education (Technical), Asaba
- College of Education, Edjeba Road, Warri, Delta State
- Delta State College of Physical Education, Mosogar
- School of Midwifery, Asaba.
- State School of Nursing Edjeba, Warri, Delta State.
- Conarina School of Maritime & Transport Technology, Oria-Abraka
