= Isoko =

Isoko may refer to:

== People ==
- Isoko Hatano (波多野 勤子; 1905–1978), Japanese developmental psychologist and writer
- Isoko Mochizuki (望月 衣塑子; born 1975), Japanese newspaper journalist
- Isoko people, an ethnic group which inhabits the region

== Places ==
- Isoko North, is one of two Local Government Areas (LGA) in the Isoko region
- Isoko South, is one of two Local Government Areas (LGA) in the Isoko region
- Isoko region, a region of Delta State, Nigeria

== Languages ==
- Isoko language, the language spoken by that ethnic group
