= Akpofure =

- Gender: Unisex
- Languages: Urhobo, Isoko

Origin
- Language: Delta State
- Origin: Nigeria
- Meaning: Life is peaceful

Akpofure translates to "Life is peaceful" in Isoko. It is a unisex name among the Urhobo and Isoko People of the Niger Delta Region.

== Notable people ==
- Venita Akpofure (born 1987), British-Nigerian actress
- Akpofure Rim-Rukeh, Nigerian professor
