= Ukodhiko Jonathan =

Nigerian politician

Ukodhiko Jonathan is a Nigerian politician. He currently serves as the Federal Representative representing Isoko North/Isoko South constituency in the 10th National Assembly.
