= Akii Ibhadode =

Prof. Akii Ibhadode

Former Vice-Chancellor of Federal University of Petroleum Resources Effurun

Personal details
- Born: Akii Ibhadode; September 13, 1957 (age 68) Nigeria
- Occupation: Academic; author
- Profession: Engineer

Akii ibhadode (born September 13, 1957) is a Nigerian academic. He became the third substantive Vice-Chancellor of the Federal University of Petroleum Resources Effurun on April 14–15, 2015 by the council of the university, and handed over to Prof Akpofure Rim-Rukeh in 2020.

== Early life ==
Ibhadode obtained his first degree from the University of Lagos with a first class in Mechanical Engineering in 1981.
