= Isoko people =

Ethnic group in the Niger Delta, Nigeria

Isoko
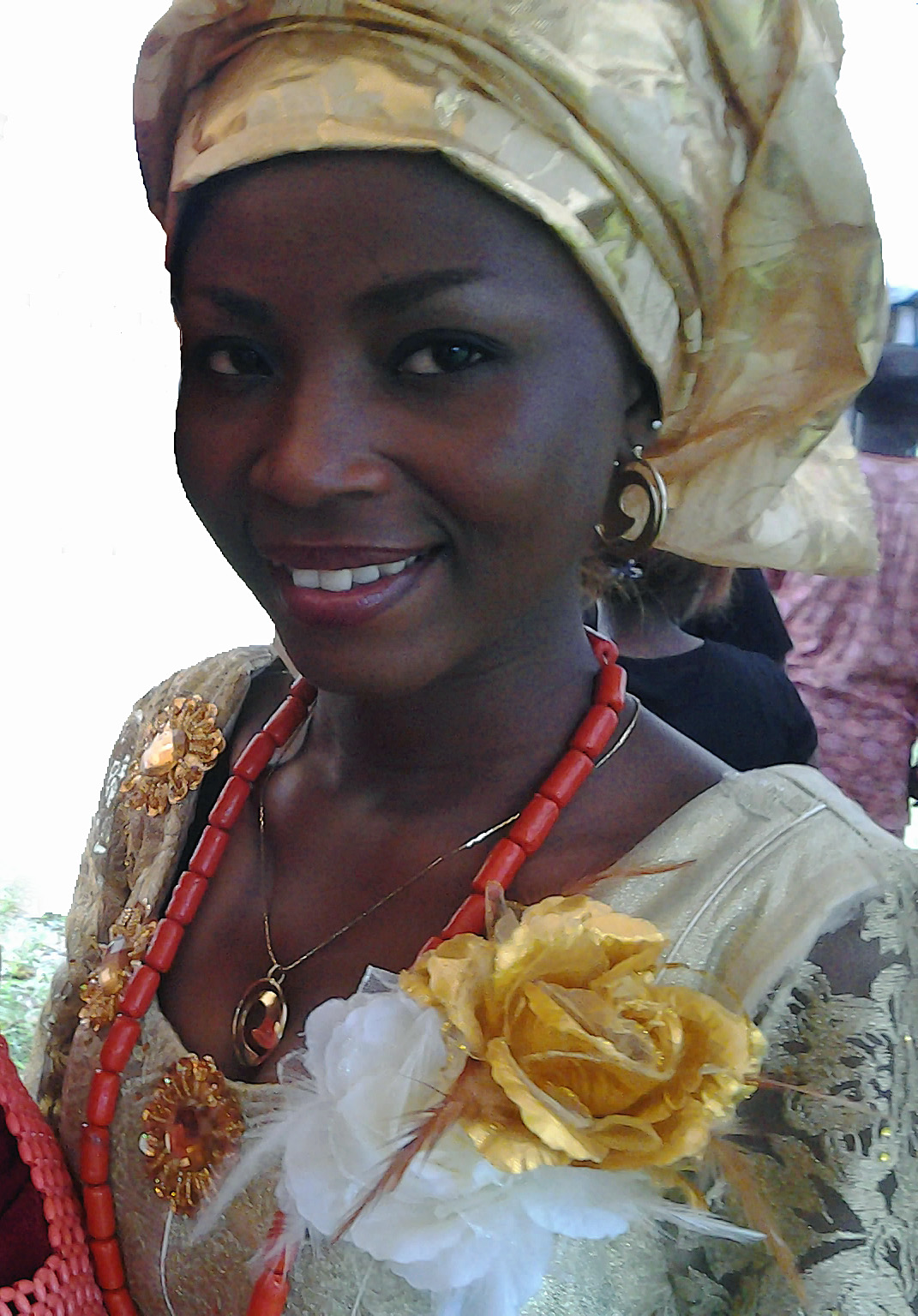
- Isoko girl

Total population
- 1,000,000 (2019)

Regions with significant populations
- Isoko region (Nigeria)

Languages
- Isoko

Religion
- Christianity and Traditional African religions

Related ethnic groups
- Urhobo, Benin, Esan, Afemai

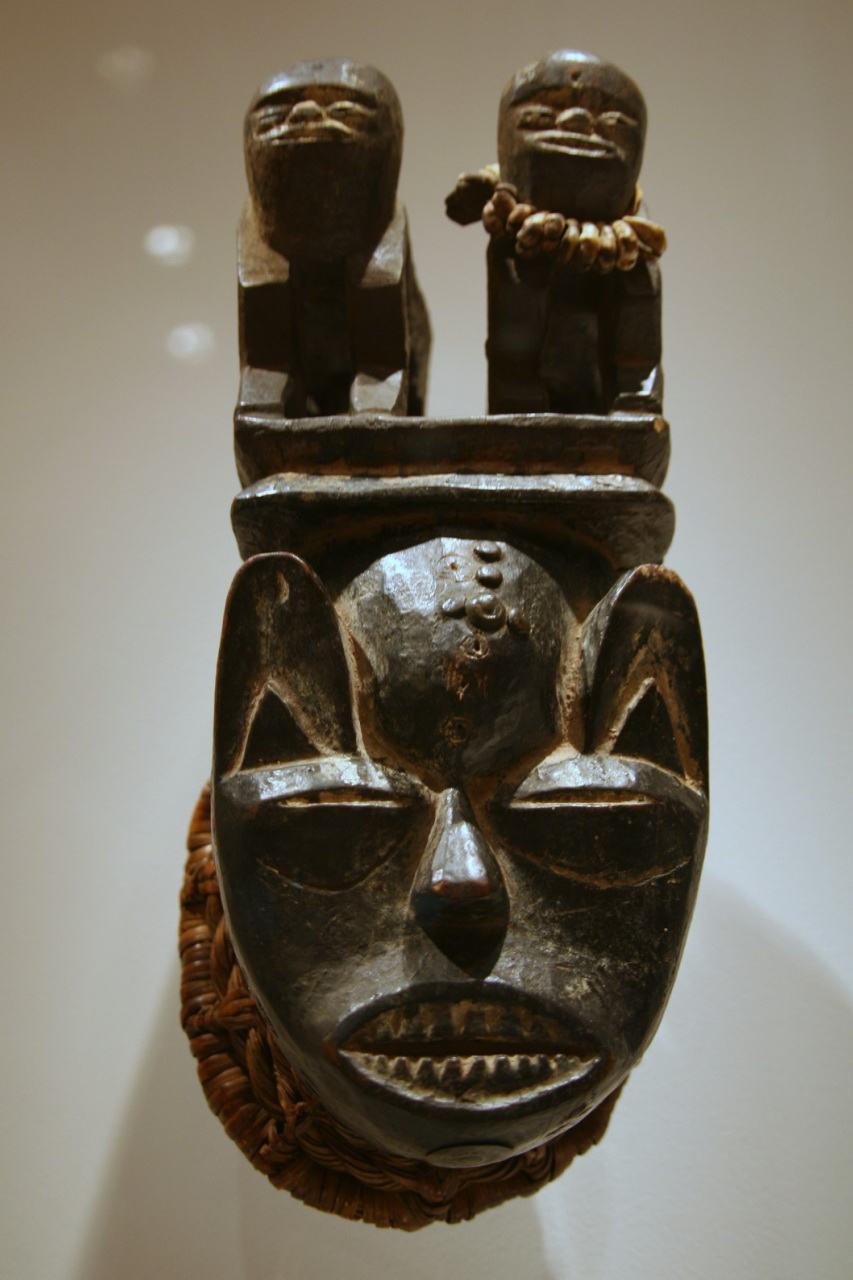
Isoko mask

The Isokos are an ethnolinguistic group who inhabit the Isoko region of Delta State and Bayelsa State, Nigeria. They are people of southern Nigeria, near the northwestern Niger delta. They speak the Isoko language – a language of the Kwa branch of the Niger-Congo family.

The Isoko culture is related to several cultures in the Niger-Delta – namely the Urhobo, Ijaw and Anioma. The Urhobo are closely related in language and culture, leading to the invaders erroneously labelling the Urhobo and Isoko cultural groups as Sobo. This name was strongly rejected by both tribes.

The Isoko tribal group consist of nineteen clans – namely Uzere, Ozoro, Erowha, Owhe, Iyede, Okpe, Emede, Igbide, Emevor, Ofagbe, Ellu, Oyede, Umeh, Irri, Aviara, Olomoro, Enwhe, Okpolo and Oleh.

In addition to the core nineteen clans, Isoko communities are also found in Bayelsa State. In Sagbama Local Government Area, the Isoko-speaking communities include Abuetor, Osifo, Osekwenike, Abolomadiere, Aleibiri and Ogbobagbene. Oral histories indicate that Abuetor, Osifo and Osekwenike migrated from Okpe-Isoko in present-day Isoko South Local Government Area of Delta State through the Isoko creek near Patani in search of farmland and fishing grounds.

== Notable people ==
- Obaro Ikime, Professor of History, University of Ibadan
- Stella Omu, Senator of the Federal Republic of Nigeria
- Jonathan Akpoborie, Nigerian international footballer
- D'Prince, Afropop singer
- Victor Ikpeba, Nigerian international footballer and brand ambassador
- Joel-Onowakpo Thomas, Senator currently representing Delta South
- Zeb Ejiro, Filmmaker
- Chico Ejiro, Filmmaker
- Eva Alordiah, rap musician
- Fred Amata, actor
- Jeta Amata, filmmaker
- Don Jazzy, record label executive
- Bovi, comedian
- Patience Oghogho Maseli, first female Deputy Director of Upstream Division at the Department of Petroleum Resources
- Evi Edna Ogholi, reggae musician
- Orezi, musician
- Daddy Showkey, garala singer
- Masai Ujiri, President and former GM of the Toronto Raptors
- Solid Star, musician
- Samuel Oboh, Canadian architect
- Cornelius Adam Igbudu (1914-1981), founder of the Anglican Adam Preaching Society
- Ogaga Ifowodo, human rights activist, lawyer, and writer
- Moses James, Boxer, Olympic medalist 1992, two time world boxing champion.
- Paul Ufuoma Omu (July 1940 – 29 April 2025), Nigerian Major General, politician, and former Military Governor of South-Eastern State (1975–1978).
- Gen. Alexander Ogomudia, retired Nigerian Army general who served as Chief of Defence Staff of Nigeria from 2003 to 2006 and Chief of Army Staff from 2001 to 2003.

== See also ==
- Anglican Adam Preaching Society
