= Susky =

Nigerian singer and songwriter

- Also known as: Susky; SuskyDMW
- Born: Success Ofa; 29 January 1999 (age 27); Delta State, Nigeria
- Genres: Afrobeats; Amapiano; hip hop
- Occupations: singer; songwriter
- Instruments: Vocals; keyboards
- Years active: 2019–present

Success Ofa (born 29 January 1999), known professionally as Susky, and formerly SuskyDMW, is a Nigerian Singer, Songwriter, and performing artist born and raised in Delta State.

== Early life and education ==
Success Ofa was born on 29 January 1999, in Delta state. He hails from Ethiope West, Local Government Area of Delta State, Nigeria. His parents are Mr Raymond Ofa, his father and Mrs Comfort Ofa, his mother. Success was raised in Oghara, Delta State where he lived with his family, and partially Ologo, in Edo State. He studied at Oghara Grammar School for his secondary education. After completing his secondary education, in 2017 he was admitted to study Science and Laboratory Technology at Otefe Polytechnic, Oghara.

== Career ==
=== 2019-2022: Career beginnings and Back Then ===
Susky began his musical career under the stage name SuskyDMW, in 2019, he used to play the keyboards while creating cover songs, and sharing freestyles on social media platforms. Susky is musically inspired by artists like Davido, Wizkid, Olamide, P-Square and 2Baba. In his early career days, he was associated with the DMW, which was how he adopted his previous stage name.

In June 2022, he released his debut single, "My Grind" featuring singer T-Wave, In July, he released follow up singles "Focus" and "Booty", which was released off his debut EP. In October 2022, Susky released his debut extended play titled "Back Then", a 5 tracks Afrobeats project which features tracks like "Booty" and "Flash Dem", the EP was a compilation of some of his singles prior to releasing his EP Project.

=== 2023-present ===
In September 2023, Susky dropped "Puna" off his debut album, on 16 December 2023, he released his 12 track debut studio album titled "Untapped", it peaked 30 on Apple Music Top albums charts in Nigeria, "Stranger" and Cloud 9" on his album received airplays on national radio stations like Soundcity FM, The Beat 99.9 FM, Urban Radio, and Cool FM in Nigeria.

In 2024, Susky commenced "Untapped tour", performing his songs across cities in Nigeria like, Delta, Benin, and Lagos. In same year "Untapped" won album of the year at the DTME Awards 2024.

On 14 May 2025 Susky released an Afrobeats party vibe "Burst My Mind" which was a testament of his new music style.

== Awards and nominations ==
Year	Organization	Awards	Recipient	Result
2020	Top Naija Music Awards	Most Promising Artiste	Himself	Won
2024	DTME Awards	Album of the Year	"Untapped"	Won
2024	BEA Awards	Next Rated	Himself	Nominated

== Discography ==
=== Singles ===
- "My Grind"
- "Focus"
- "Jah Bless"
- "Puna"
- "Burst My Mind"

=== Eps ===
- "Back Then"

=== Albums ===
- "Untapped"
