= Splash FM =

Splash FM may refer to:

- Splash FM (Nigeria), a radio station in Ibadan, Nigeria
- More Radio Worthing, a radio station in Sussex, England, known as Splash FM from 2003 to 2016
