= Aradhe =

- Location in Nigeria
- Coordinates: 5°37′N 6°18′E
- Country: Nigeria
- State: Delta State

Aradhe is a town in the Isoko North Local Government Area (LGA), Isoko region of Delta State, Nigeria. The town has an estimated population of 20,000 inhabitants. Aradhe has a primary school called Aradhe Primary School founded in 19XX and a secondary school called Aradhe Grammar School founded in 19xx. The inhabitants of Aradhe are friendly and accommodating. The major occupation of the people are farming and trading. Aradhe Market day comes up every seven days interval. Major articles traded are garri, Cassava Starch, Yams. Palm oil, fruits etc. The Town is surrounded by swampland. Aradhe share a royal crown with two other communities which are Ovredhe and Ellu. The three communities are called Eraewhosa meaning Three Crown.
