= Ikpide =

Town in Nigeria

Ikpide is an Isoko town in Isoko South local government area, Delta State, Nigeria. It is located on the eastern bank of the lower River Niger between the source of the River Nun and Ubioakpere. The traditional north–south boundaries of Ikpide are the Ofavre-Uto Canal and Ubioakpere.
