= Nigeria Private University Games Association =

- Status: Active
- Genre: Sporting event
- Frequency: Biennial
- Location: Various
- Country: Nigeria
- Inaugurated: 2003 (founded); 2005 (first games)
- Organiser: Committee of Vice Chancellors and Registrars (CVCR) of Nigeria Private Universities
- Website: http://npuga.org

Nigeria Private University Games Association (often abbreviated as NPUGA Games) is a national sporting competition, organized by the Committee of Vice Chancellors and Registrars for private universities in Nigeria. By constitution, the 74 private universities accredited by the National Universities Commission are eligible to compete; however, only 36 of them are listed as affiliated universities on the official website of the games.

Founded in 2003, the competition is held once every two years at a host university. The objectives of the games according to the organizers are to promote national unity through sports; encourage physical and mental fitness among its participants; and act as a preparatory phase for athletes who could potentially represent Nigeria at international competitions. The games competed for by participating universities includes athletics, badminton, basketball, chess, football, Scrabble, swimming, table tennis, tennis and volleyball.

Dr. Diyaolu Babajide, from Afe Babalola University is the current president of the association. Durogbade Adejoke, a gold medalist from the games, represented Nigeria at All African Games and Olympic Games.

At the sixth edition, Al-Hikmah University were suspended for two years for not displaying the spirit of sportsmanship during an event.

Benson Idahosa University have won the most medals since the inception of the games.

== List of presidents ==
President	University	from	to	Ref
John Okoro	Igbinedion University	2003	2013	
Akintunde Akinola	Achievers University	2013	2024	
Dr. Diyaolu Babajide	Afe Babalola University	2024	Present	[15]

== Winners by medals table ==
The number of gold medals won in the competition are written in parentheses.

Date	Host	Champions	Runners-up	Third place
2005	Igbinedion University	Benson Idahosa University	Igbinedion University	Babcock University
2007	Lead City University	Benson Idahosa University	Lead City University	Babcock University
2009	American University of Nigeria	Benson Idahosa University	American University of Nigeria	Babcock University
2011	Western Delta University	Benson Idahosa University	Western Delta University	Igbinedion University
2013	Joseph Ayo Babalola University	Benson Idahosa University	Afe Babalola University (14)	Lead City University
2015	Afe Babalola University	Benson Idahosa University (40)	Afe Babalola University (23)	Igbinedion University (7)
2017	Nigerian Turkish Nile University	Benson Idahosa University (38)	Afe Babalola University (14)	Igbinedion University (10)
2024	Elizade University	Benson Idahosa University (14)	Achievers University (5)	Lead City University (3)
