= Patience Maseli =

- Oghogho
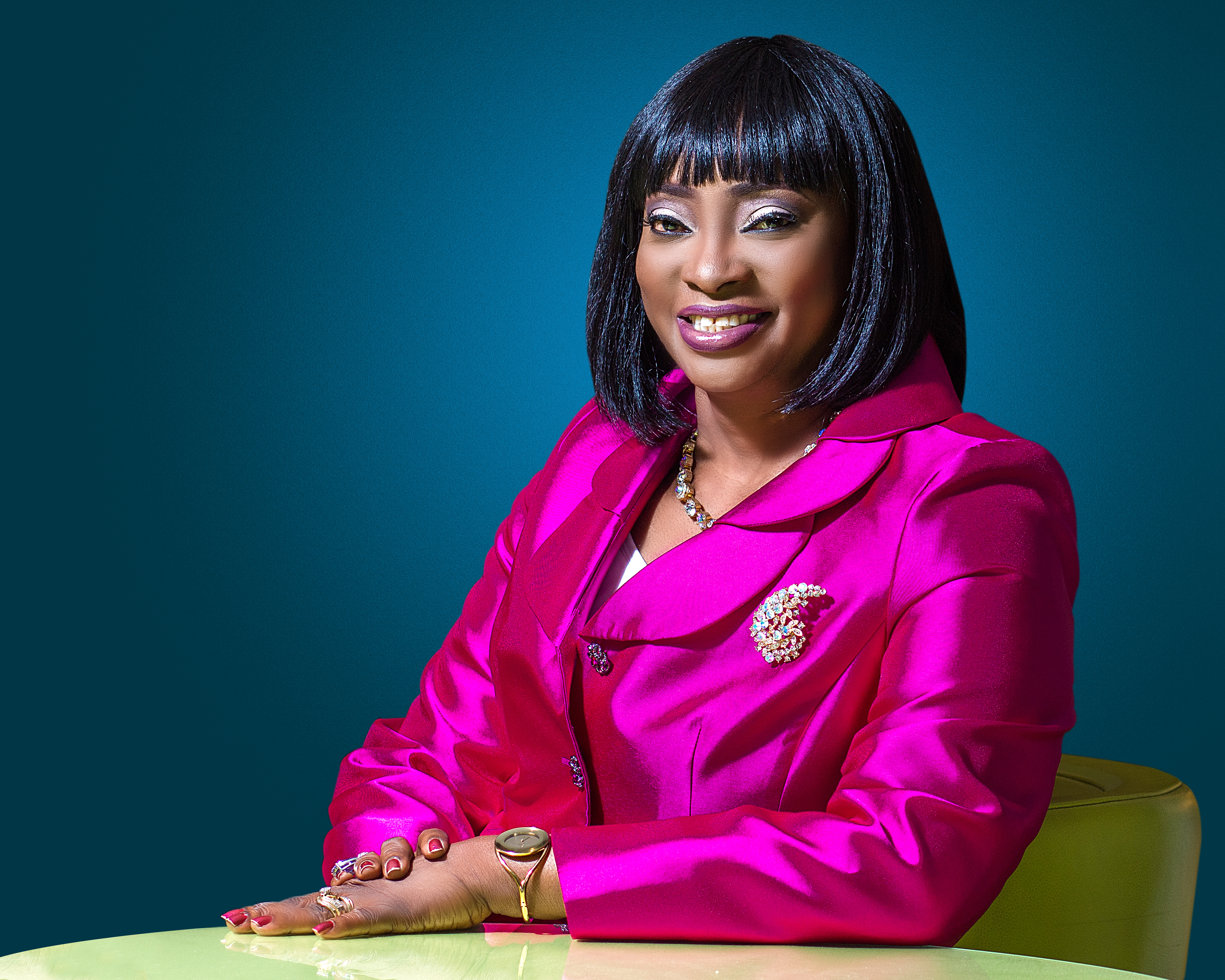
- Born: Patience Oghogho Akpokene
- Education: University of Benin
- Occupation: Civil servant (retired)
- Years active: 1984–2018
- Employer: Department of Petroleum Resources
- Patience Maseli

Patience Oghogho Maseli is a former Deputy Director of the Upstream Division at the Department of Petroleum Resources (DPR), a position from which she retired in November 2018. She is the first woman to hold that position. She was the head of the first steering committee of Women in Geosciences and Engineering (WiGE). She christened a Drillship West Capella in South Korea on which her name is inscribed.

== Early life and education ==
Pat Maseli started her education at St. Maria Goretti Girls Secondary School, Benin City in Edo State after which she proceeded for her A Level at Federal Government College, Warri in Delta State. She then proceeded to the University of Benin for her tertiary education and graduated with a BSc in Botany. She also graduated with a M.Sc degree in Petroleum geology from the University of Port Harcourt, Rivers State.

== Career ==
After her graduation from the University of Benin in 1982, Patience Maseli was deployed to Rivers State for the mandatory National Youth Service Programme of the National Youth Service Corps. She was posted to the Research and Development Division of the Nigerian National Petroleum Corporation (NNPC) where she worked as a palynologist within the geology laboratory. She gained full employment into the NNPC in 1983 and was deployed to the Petroleum Inspectorate Division (now known as the Department of Petroleum Resources) as a Petrophysicist. She was promoted to the position of Senior Geologist in 1992, Chief Geologist in 2003, Assistant Director in 2006 and finally to the position of Deputy Director and Head of Upstream Division in 2017. She retired in November 2018 when she attained the mandatory retirement age of 60 years.

== Personal life ==
Patience Maseli is from Ibrede community in Ndokwa East Local Government Area of Delta State. Although Ibrede is in Ndokwa East, she is an Isoko woman by tribe. She is a Christian. She is married with children and her wedding ceremony was conducted by Archbishop Benson Idahosa.
