= 1992 Nigerian Senate elections in Delta State =

1992 Nigerian Senate election in Delta State

The 1992 Nigerian Senate election in Delta State was held on July 4, 1992, to elect members of the Nigerian Senate to represent Delta State. Dan Azinge representing Delta North, Francis Okpozo representing Delta South and W.O. Eradajaye representing Delta Central all won on the platform of the Social Democratic Party.

== Overview ==
Affiliation	Party		Total
Affiliation	SDP	NRC	Total
Before Election			3
After Election	3	0	3

== Summary ==
District	Incumbent	Party	Elected Senator	Party
Delta North			Dan Azinge	SDP
Delta South			Francis Okpozo	SDP
Delta Central			W.O. Eradajaye	SDP

== Results ==
=== Delta North ===
The election was won by Dan Azinge of the Social Democratic Party.

1992 Nigerian Senate election in Delta State
Party	Candidate	Votes	%
SDP	Dan Azinge		
Total votes			
SDP hold			

=== Delta South ===
The election was won by Francis Okpozo of the Social Democratic Party.

1992 Nigerian Senate election in Delta State
Party	Candidate	Votes	%
SDP	Francis Okpozo		
Total votes			
SDP hold			

=== Delta Central ===
The election was won by W.O. Eradajaye of the Social Democratic Party.

1992 Nigerian Senate election in Delta State
Party	Candidate	Votes	%
SDP	W.O. Eradajaye		
Total votes			
SDP hold			
