= Delta State University Teaching Hospital =

Hospital in Oghara, Nigeria

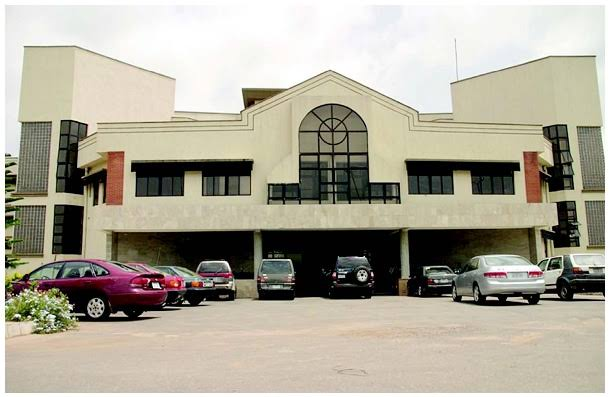

Geography
- Location: Oghara, Ethiope West, Southern, Delta State, Nigeria
- Coordinates: 5.9594109088495495°N 5.7024243507326°E

Organisation
- Type: Teaching
- Affiliated university: Delta State University

Services
- Emergency department: Available

History
- Opened: June 10, 2020

Links
- Website: https://delsuth.org.ng/
- Lists: Hospitals in Nigeria

Delta State University Teaching Hospital (popularly known as DELSUTH) is a hospital in Oghara, Nigeria. It was inaugurated on 10 June 2020 by Goodluck Jonathan, former president of the federal republic of Nigeria, to provide tertiary health care through training of undergraduate medical students at the Delta State University, Abraka. The facility is located at Oghara in Ethiope West Local Government Area of Delta State, South East, Nigeria.

Delta State University Teaching Hospital (DELSUTH), is also an affiliate of the Delta State University (Abraka).
