= Anglican Adam Preaching Society =

The Anglican Adam Preaching Society is an interdenominational evangelical Christian movement based in Nigeria, which was founded by an evangelist of the Church of Nigeria, Anglican Communion, the late Cornelius Adam Igbudu who hailed from Araya in Isokoland.

According to the A.A.P.S. official website, the evangelical group "is an interdenominational preaching society under the umbrella of the Anglican Communion. It stands for professional soul winning and being run by self-sacrifice and freewill donations". It was considered as being "famous for the spread of the gospel of Christ across Nigeria".

Professor Peter Palmer Ekeh, Founder of Urhobo Historical Society, later wrote in his book: History of the Urhobo People of Niger Delta, that "The evangelical movement of Adam's Anglican Preaching Society (A.A.P.S.), which he [Igbudu] founded, bestrode the Anglican Communion in the Former Bendel State. It created waves of mass conversions".

== History ==
History has it that Cornelius Adam Igbudu was born in 1914 in a rustic village of Araya to Isoko pagan parents who then practised African indigenous religion, and prior to his conversion to Christianity in 1927, he was part of a traditional dance group in Uzere in Isokoland.

Shortly after Igbudu left the dance group, in 1938 he formed the "Ole-Orufuo", a prayer group which later metamorphosed into an evangelical group. After the movement locally became known as the "Ukoko Adamu" (meaning, "Adam's Preaching Society") in 1946, in the ensuing years there was a need to integrate it into the Nigerian Anglican Church and the word "Anglican" was formally added to the name of the group.

== Evangelistic impact ==
The evangelical group of A.A.P.S. in the Church of Nigeria, Anglican Communion, over the years has significantly promoted evangelical Anglicanism and, through Igbudu's evangelism, has also "won thousands to Christ".

The Anglican Adam Preaching Society (A.A.P.S) has not gone defunct along with Cornelius Adam Igbudu in 1981. In fact, it has gained momentum over the years and, according to Professor Sam U. Erivwo, through this movement the Urhobo, the Isoko and the Itsekiri witnessed (and are still witnessing) phenomenal revival.

With the advent of Christianity in Nigeria, the evangelical group of A.A.P.S., through Igbudu's evangelism, Africanized Anglicanism and made the physiognomy of practical Christian expression of African spirituality real to many Africans, notably the Isoko people and the Urhobo people in the present-day Delta State of Nigeria. Consequently, the evangelistic activities of the evangelical group seem to have led to a decline in the practice of several traditional African religions, as many Urhobo people as well as Isoko people have now become Christians and have nothing to do with idol worship. It earned its founder a eulogy of being one of "Isoko's greatest evangelists".

== Musical impact ==
The musical impact of the A.A.P.S. evangelical movement continues to be seen today as having revolutionized both Isoko and Urhobo gospel music with the introduction of indigenous African music by Igbudu himself, "a man whose Isoko self-composed songs inspired many".

At that time when the style of worship and the mode of music in the mission churches were predominantly influenced by western civilization, which left many Africans with the feeling of spiritual alienation, Cornelius Adam Igbudu came into the scene and caused a change of practice by introducing indigenous Isoko music to the mission churches. It earned Igbudu a commendation from E. Onosemuode, who called him "a great musical reformer among Isoko and Urhobo Christians".

Other writers in 2022 also mentioned Igbudu's name among those "who could be regarded as pioneers" of indigenous African music. However, other notable people of Isoko and Urhobo extractions, who seemed "to have followed after the steps of the pioneers", later included Evi Edna Ogholi and Kefee Obareki Don Momoh.

In 2005, the A.A.P.S. evangelical movement's sustained musical influence in the Church of Nigeria, Anglican Communion, was particularly evident in the rendition of "entertainment songs by the Anglican Adam Preaching Society (AAPS) band" during a church service held in commemoration of Bishop Agori Iwe who died on July 9, 1979.

== Socio-economic impact ==
From the days of Cornelius Adam Igbudu until now, the evangelical group of A.A.P.S. is also noted for its genuine concern about providing social services, especially for its members.

== Religious disputes ==
Igbudu, the founder of the A.A.P.S. evangelical movement, was said to have had a disagreement with a prominent Nigerian Isoko cleric, Archbishop Christian Aggrey Apena, whom he accused of "disturbing his ministry" in the Nigerian Anglican Church.

In the early 1970s, the Anglican Adam Preaching Society (A.A.P.S.) and the Scripture Union (S.U.) were accused of what Archbishop Christian Aggrey Apena considered as being "religiously rebellious", by the Anglican hierarchy who felt that some members of both "evangelistic wings of the Church" were not only introducing strange doctrines to the Church but also challenging the constituted authorities of the Church. Consequently, it led to the excommunication of several A.A.P.S. members from the Church.

== Leadership ==
Since the death of its founder on 12 March 1981, the evangelical group of A.A.P.S. has continued to operate under a plethora of elected National Executives.

As of 2026, the leaders of the A.A.P.S. movement included National President, Evang. Sir. J. I. Afimoni (JP), Evang. J. Aso - National Secretary, and Evang. Emma Ofano (JP) - Music Director.
