= Uro =

Uro or URO may refer to:

- Aurochs, the predecessor of modern cattle
- Uro Bonsai technique; see deadwood bonsai techniques
- Uro, Delta, Nigeria
- Uro (film), directed by Stefan Faldbakken
- URO (singer) (born 1997), a Danish singer and songwriter
- Uro (trucks), a Spanish truck manufacturer
- Uromastyx, a genus of lizards
- Uros, a people of South America
- Uru–Chipaya languages, the family of languages spoken by the Uro people.
- United Restitution Organization, a legal aid service for victims of the Nazis
- Rouen Airport, of which URO is the IATA code
- Unified Repertoire and Ordering, an alternative name for the CJK Unified Ideographs (Unicode block).
