= Francis Okpozo =

Nigerian politician

Francis Spanner Okpozo (died 26 December 2016) was a Nigerian politician who served as a senator during the Second Republic where he represented the Delta South Senatorial District.

== Early life ==
Francis Spanner Okpozo was born in Ozoro, Isoko North, Delta State.

== Career ==
Okpozo served as the deputy speaker of the defunct Bendel State House of Assembly, representing under the Unity Party of Nigeria (UPN) prior to the military coup in 1984. He was later elected to the Nigerian Senate, where he represented the Delta South Senatorial District during the Second Republic as a member of the Social Democratic Party (SDP).

Following the return to civilian rule, Okpozo was appointed as Chairman of the Senate Committee on Environment in 1992. He also became involved with the All Progressives Congress (APC), where he held a leadership role in the party in Delta State.

== Death ==
Okpozo died on 26 December 2016, at the age of 81, following a brief illness.
