= Enhwe =

Town in Nigeria

- Town
- Interactive map of Enhwe
- Coordinates: 5°22′1″N 6°6′24″E
- Local Government Area: Isoko South
- Delta: Delta State
- Country: Nigeria
- Time zone: UTC+1 (WAT)
- Postal code: 334108

Enhwe is a town in Nigeria situated in Isoko South, Delta State. Grouped into two, it holds a central administration in Uruchie while the other, Otu Enhwe.

== History ==
Enhwe originated during the 12th century from Benin Empire. Okpolo left Enhwe and moved to Elele (now in Rivers State) and later back to Enhwe on realization that the brothers still surgeon there around 1416 AD along his clan to Isoko through the river in Niger Delta. The history of the settlement was covered with many stories and researchers found it difficult to conclude with one. During the pioneer Benin dynasty, Oviota Oriro, son of the third Ogiso left his native land with some people including his supporters Uvie, Ediagbon, Ekedi, Afia, Okpolo and many others following his denial to become the king. They had a brief sojourn at "Jesse" and later left as a result of war threats from the Oba. They found "Uri (a village in Enhwe) (now referred to as Isoko South) and after some time, they left until they finally settled in "Uruchie". It was there that Oriro became the first King in 1235 AD.

The other area Otu Enhwe was created when they left Enhwe for "Elele" as a result of the war. After they returned to Enhwe since their relations lived there, they settled at the extreme of the land, which is near to Igbide Kingdom.

== Administration ==
Enhwe Kingdom is ruled by the "Ovie", the traditional ruler who emerges from the two ruling houses: "Erhebor" and "Evba". The Ogbaide are responsible for preparing the Ovie's symbol of authority, the Eri-Ivie. Since its founding, Enhwe Kingdom has been ruled by seventeen kings.

In recent years, the community previously experienced a kingship dispute following the death of the former monarch, HRM B. D. Osha, in July 2013. Following his death, a regency was held by Prince David Osha for three years before the new monarch was crowned.

The current Ovie is HRM Anthony Onomuefe Efekodha, a former member of the House of Representatives and a member of the Nigerian Society of Engineers.
