= Kenneth Ogba =

Nigerian politician (died 2021)

Hon Kenneth Ogba

Member, Delta State House of Assembly representing Isoko South Constituency 1
- In office 10 June 2019 – 27 June 2021
- Preceded by: Orezi Esievo

Personal details
- Born: Kenneth Edafe Ogba; 1966 or 1967
- Died: 27 June 2021 (aged 54) Oleh, Isoko South, Delta State, Nigeria
- Party: Peoples Democratic Party
- Occupation: Politician

Kenneth Edafe Ogba (1966/1967 – 27 June 2021) was a Nigerian politician and a member of the Delta State House of Assembly representing Isoko South Constituency 1 in the 7th Delta State House of Assembly.

== Political career ==
On 9 March 2019, Kenneth Edafe Ogba, representing Peoples Democratic Party defeated Okiemute Essien of the All Progressives Congress and won the seat to represent Isoko South Constituency 1 at the Delta State House of Assembly. He received 15,973 votes, while Essien received 7,323 votes.

On 10 June 2019, Ogba replaced Orezi Esievo in the Delta State House of Assembly.

== Personal life ==
Ogba is from Oleh, Isoko South, Delta State, Nigeria. His father is Lucky Ogba.

== Death ==
Ogba slumped and died on 27 June 2021 at Oleh, Isoko South, Delta State, Nigeria.
