= Anendlessocean =

Nigerian artist (born 1996)

Anendlessocean (Ayobami Emmanuel Alli-Hakeem) (born 10 August 1996) is a Nigerian singer, songwriter, and music producer. He is often referred to by the acronym AEO and is recognized for his introspective lyrics and ambient, emotionally driven sound.

== Early life and education ==
He was born in Nigeria to a Yoruba father from Ondo State and an Edo mother. He spent much of his early life in Abuja, where he was raised until his teenage years.

A significant event in his early life was the death of his mother when he was 14, an experience that later influenced the emotional and spiritual depth of his music.

He studied Petroleum Engineering at the Federal University of Petroleum Resources, Effurun, Delta State, earning a Bachelor of Engineering degree between 2014 and 2019.

== Career ==
Anendlessocean began his musical journey in church choirs, where he developed his songwriting and vocal skills. He later transitioned into recording music independently, shaping a distinctive sound rooted in spirituality and introspection.

He made his official debut with the single "Falala" in 2018, followed by “Alakori” in 2020, which brought him wider recognition.

== Breakthrough and projects ==
In 2021, he released his debut extended play Apeirogon, which received critical acclaim for its unconventional approach to gospel music.

His debut studio album, Decagon (2023), marked a major milestone in his career and contributed to his growing popularity in Nigeria and beyond.

- Hexagon (EP, 2024)
- Octagon (album, 2024)
- Sceptre (EP, 2025)

He has also embarked on tours and performed live, including a sold-out concert at the Federal Palace Hotel in Lagos in 2023.

== Discography ==
=== Studio albums ===
- Decagon (2023)
- Octagon (2024)
- Extended plays (EPs)
- Apeirogon (2021)
- Hexagon (2024)
- Sceptre (2025)

=== Singles ===
- Falala (2018)
- Alakori (2020)
- Domino (2021)
- Gratitude (2024)
- Lmly (2024)
