= Duke Okoro =

Nigerian academic administrator

Rector, Federal Polytechnic, Orogun
- Incumbent
- Assumed office February 2023

Personal details
- Born: Duke Okoro Ekrokpe town, Ughelli South Local Government Area of Delta State

Duke Okoro is a Nigerian educational administrator. He is the pioneer Rector of the Federal Polytechnic, Orogun in Ughelli North Local Government Area of Delta State, Nigeria. Okoro is the former director, International Development at the Federal University of Petroleum Resources, Effurun, Delta State.

== Early life and education ==
Duke Okoro completed his Bachelors of Technology programme at the Federal University of Technology, Akure. In 2005, he obtained a doctorate degree in Environmental Analytical Chemistry from the University of Benin.

== See also ==
- List of polytechnics in Nigeria
