= Orie, Delta State =

Orie
- Location in Nigeria
- Coordinates: 5°31′N 6°20′E
- Country: Nigeria
- State: Delta State

Population
  - Total: 3,000
- Time zone: UTC+1 (WAT)

Orie is a village of approximately 3,000 people, and located in the Isoko South LGA of Delta State, Nigeria. It is also called Orie-Irri because its inhabitants are generally believed to have originally migrated from Irri town. Orie is surrounded by three villages: Opke, Ofagbe and Utue.
