= Jacob Oboreh =

Nigerian Professor of Operations Research and Management

Vice chancellor of Delta State University of Science and Technology, Ozoro
- Incumbent
- Assumed office 2021

Rector of Delta State Polytechnic, Ozoro
- In office 2013–2017
- Succeeded by: Job Akpodiete

Personal details
- Born: Ozoro, Delta State
- Party: Non-Partisan
- Spouse: Justina Oboreh

Jacob Snapps Oboreh is a Nigerian Professor of Operations Research and Management who was a former Rector of Delta State Polytechnic, Ozoro and the Pioneer Vice Chancellor of Delta State University of Science and Technology, Ozoro.

He was the Rector of Delta State Polytechnic, Ozoro from 2012 until his tenure expired in 2017.

== Career ==
On 26 April 2021, Oboreh was appointed the pioneer Vice Chancellor of Delta State University of Science and Technology, Ozoro by Governor Ifeanyi Okowa.

== Personal life ==
Jacob Oboreh is married to Justina Oboreh who is a Management Scholar at the Delta State University, Abraka, and they are blessed with children.
