= Dennis Osadebay University =

Public University in Asaba, Delta State

Dennis Osadebay University, Asaba
- Other name: DOU
- Former names: Delta State University, Anwai Campus
- Motto: Empowering future generations
- Type: Public
- Established: 2021
- Vice-Chancellor: Samuel Ovuete Aghalino
- Location: Asaba, Delta State, Nigeria
- Campus: Anwai main campus
- Colors: Purple and Green
- Website: www.dou.edu.ng

The Dennis Osadebay University, Asaba is a Public University in Asaba, Delta State, Nigeria.

Dennis Osadebay University, Asaba is one of the three new universities established by the Delta State government and approved by the National Universities Commission (NUC) in 2021. This university offers Undergraduate courses and currently comprises six faculties: Agriculture, Science, Management and Social Sciences, Environmental Science, Arts and Computing. The pioneer Vice Chancellor of Dennis Osadebay University was Professor Ben Emukufia Akpoyomare Oghojafor. The current Vice Chancellor is Professor Samuel Ovuete Aghalino.

== History ==
The Dennis Osadebey University, Asaba was formerly Delta State University, Anwai Campus until it was converted to a full university by the Delta State Government.

In January 2021, Governor Ifeanyi A Okowa of Delta State announced plans to convert Delta State University, Anwai Campus Asaba and two other schools such as Delta State Polytechnic, Ozoro and College of Education, Agbor into a full-fledged University. The bills had their first reading during plenary at the Delta State House of Assembly on the 28th day of January 2021. In February 2021, the bills were passed into law after going through the House Committee on Education.

While signing the bill which was passed by the State House of Assembly, Governor Ifeanyi A Okowa said, "As the students of our technical education start to progress from the technical colleges to the polytechnics, they also have a chance of going further to the University of Science and Technology."

== See also ==
- List of universities in Nigeria
- List of Tertiary Institutions in Delta State
- Delta State University, Abraka
- Delta State University of Science and Technology, Ozoro
- University of Delta, Agbor
- University of Benin (Nigeria)
