= Emevor =

Town in Isoko North Local Government Area, Delta State

- Town
- Emevor
- Location in Nigeria
- Coordinates: 5°30′44″N 6°07′06″E
- Country: Nigeria
- State: Delta State
- Local Government Area: Isoko North

Government
  - Type: Local Government

Population (2009)
  - Total: 8,000
- Time zone: UTC+1 (WAT)
- Postal code: 334116
- Climate: Aw

Emevor is a town in Isoko North Local Government Area of Delta State, southern Nigeria. Its population was 8000 as of 2009. Emevor shares boundaries with the villages of Ebor-Iyede, Agharha, Otor Owhe and Orogun. It is about 13 kilometres (8.1 miles) to the East of Ughelli township stadium. It has two markets locally known as "Ekiedhe" and "Ekiewo". The traditional ruler of Emevor is known as Odion. There are however other community leaders such as president general, chairman, etc. It is historically known to be a peaceful place. The people speak a distinct Isoko language. It is an oil producing community in the Niger Delta region.

== History ==
According to oral tradition, the people of Emevor migrated from Iyede, an Isoko speaking community. The town was founded by Emewha, who led the people of Emevor from Iyede after the leaders of Iyede were persecuting the Aka people. Emewha is commemorated in the town by having a primary school named after him. Emevor comes from an Isoko expression that means the house if full of children.

== Geography ==
Emevor is located in Isoko North Local Government Area. The town lies in the tropical rainforest of the western Niger Delta, in the western coastlands of Nigeria. The coastal plain on which the town is situated on is made of young sedimentary rocks. There is a creek with a bridge covering over it outside the town.

== Economy ==
As a rural economy, Emevor's economic landscape is predominantly shaped by agriculture. The locals are engaged in farming of cassava, oil palm and other agricultural staples. There are two markets that hold twice weekly in the town.

== Education ==
There town is home to several schools. There are two public secondary schools in the town:

- James Welch Grammar School Emevor; and
- Emevor Mixed Secondary School.

There are also two public primary schools in the community:

- Emehwa Primary school; and
- Odion Primary School.

There are other private schools in the community as well.

=== Tertiary Education ===
Emevor has a branch of the National Open University of Nigeria.

==== Adam Igbudu Christian Institute ====
Adam Igbudu Christian Institute is a seminary based in Emevor that is named after the founder of the Anglican Adam Preaching Society, Cornelius Adam Igbudu (1914-1981). The institute offers several certificates in theology and is nominally affiliated with the University of Port Harcourt.

== Transportation ==
Emevor is well connected in terms of transportation. It is situated along the Ughelli-Asaba Road. There are also roads that connect the town with Orogun, Agbara-Otor, Owhe and Olomoro.
