= Ellu =

Commune in Nigeria

Ellu is a rural countryside community in Isoko, Delta State of Nigeria that was founded around the 18th century. Bounded in the north by Emu-Uno community, in the south by Ozoro and Idheze communities, in the east by Ofagbe community, and in the west by Owhelogbo community, Ellu is located within longitude 6'13 East and latitude 5'36 North. These geographical boundaries incorporate Aradhe and Ovrode communities, which are Ellu's sister communities in the north and east, respectively.

According to the 1995 National census, Ellu has a population of 10,000 people. While a large proportion of the inhabitants of Ellu are subsistence farmers, a growing number are civil servants and small-scale entrepreneurs. The Ovie of Ellu is the traditional head of the community.

A majority of the people are professed Christians while a dwindling number still practise the African Traditional Religion. The community has two public primary schools, a public secondary school, and a number of private schools. A government-funded health care centre is also located in the community. Ellu is founded by Akaje, Ogwaru, Ogeidhe, Ogike and Orodo from Owhe. Akaje brothers Egbeta and Esakpa founded Aradhe, while Ovime founder of Ovrode migrated from Uruode in Ellu.

The Elephant (Èni) is the totem of the Ellu people.

== Akaje and Osa ==
- Akaje, one of the founders of Ellu, invited Osa, a descendant of Ugwuoye, to come live with him in Ellu. This invitation was extended to help Osa avoid attacks from the Aboh king.
- The connection between Osa and the Aboh kingdom is notable: Osa's daughter had been married to the Aboh king. However, due to issues in her marriage, she returned to her family, which may have led to tension between Osa's family and the Aboh kingdom.

== Resolution of the Conflict ==
- The conflict, which originated from the issues between Osa's daughter and the Aboh king, and the subsequent attacks on Osa, was settled in a peaceful manner by the next generation.
- The traditional Prime Minister of Ellu, Aghra Otobo Inibu, the grandson of Akaje, played a key role in this resolution. He offered his daughter in marriage to Ossai, one of the successors to the Aboh throne.
- This marriage to the King of Aboh, Ossai, symbolized a truce and the strengthening of ties between Ellu and the Aboh Kingdom. Through this union, the historical tension between the two groups was resolved, fostering peace and collaboration.
- The descendants of Akaje have made significant contributions to various fields, continuing the legacy of their ancestor in prominent ways:
  1. General Alexander O. Ogomudia – A highly respected military figure, he served as the Chief of Defence Staff of Nigeria, showcasing his leadership in the nation's military structure.
  2. Prof. Patience Donwa – A distinguished academic, she is associated with the University of Benin, where she contributes to education and research, reflecting a commitment to knowledge and development of accountancy in the USA and Nigeria.
  3. Mr. Henry Oroh – A key figure in the banking sector, he holds a prominent position of executive director at Zenith Bank, demonstrating influence and leadership in Nigeria's financial industry.

== Economy ==
Ellu economy is based on farming, fishing, and the production of palm oil and kernels. The main food crops are yams and cassava, supplemented by corn (maize), beans, peppers, and rubber. There are petroleum-producing fields in the area. Ogini Field is located in Ellu, Ovrode, Ozoro and Ofagbe adjoining boundaries.

== Demographics ==
Ellu community lies between Ozoro and Kwale, along Ughelli-Asaba Expressway.

== Festivals ==
In Ellu Kingdom an annual, seven-day, festival, called Etor takes place in Ellu.

== Religious beliefs ==
The main focus of Ellu traditional religion is the adoration of "Ọghẹnẹ" (Almighty God), the supreme deity, and recognition of Edhor and Erhan (divinities). Some of these divinities could be regarded as personified attributes of Ọghẹnẹ. Ellu also worship God with Orhe (white chalk). If an Ellu feels oppressed by someone, he appeals to Ọghẹnẹ, who he believes to be an impartial judge, to adjudicate between him and his opponent. Oghene is the fundamental factor and manifestation of all divinities. Ellu divinities can be classified into four main categories, which probably coincide with historical development. These categories are Guardian divinities, War divinities, Prosperity divinities and Fertility and Ethical divinities.

Erhin, which is the cult of ancestors and predecessors (Esemo), is another important element. The dead are believed to be living, and looked upon as active members who watch over the affairs of their family. Ellu people believe in the duality of man, i.e., that man consists of two beings: physical body (Ugboma) and spiritual body (Ezi).

It is the Ezi that declares man's destiny and controls the self-realization of man's destiny before he incarnates into the world. Ezi also controls the overall well being (Ufuoma) of the man. Ọghẹnẹ is like a monarch who sets his seal on the path of destiny.

In the spirit world, Ezi, man's destiny is ratified and sealed. In the final journey of the Ezi, after transition, Ellu believe the physical body, Ugboma, decays while the Ezi is indestructible and joins the ancestors in Ezi. The elaborate and symbolic burial rites are meant to prepare the departed Ezi for happy re-union with the ancestors.

Despite this age-old and complex belief system, the influence of western civilization and Christianity is fast becoming an acceptable religion in Ellu clan. Many belong to Catholic and new evangelical denominations.

Evha divination, similar to the Yoruba Ifá and practiced by many West African ethnic groups, is practiced with strings of cowries. There are so many edhor (deities).
