= Abel Ubeku =

Nigerian business executive

Chief Dr. Abel Kprogidi Ubeku (24 February 1936 - 9 March 2014) was a Nigerian business executive who was a presidential aspirant during the Social Democratic Party primary in 1992, a member of the Committee for National Consensus (CNC) during the Abacha transition program and also former Guinness Nigeria Managing Director.

== Personal life ==
Ubeku hailed from Araya, in the Isoko community of Delta State. He was educated at University of London finishing with a Master of Laws degree in 1971, he obtained a PhD from University of Sussex and his thesis published in 1983 was titled Industrial Relations in Developing Countries: The Case of Nigeria.

After completing his A-Level from Nigeria College of Arts, Science and Technology, Ibadan, he started working as a primary school teacher in 1956, not motivated to continue teaching and interested in leadership roles, he joined Nigeria Tobacco Company in 1961 as a trainee, later becoming a personnel officer. He was promoted personnel manager in 1966 and served in that position until 1971 when he was appointed executive secretary of the Industrial Training Fund. After a couple of years with the fund, he was employed at Guinness Nigeria as the country Personnel Manager, he became a director in the company in 1975 and was appointed the first Nigeria managing director in 1982, the same year the Harp brewery in Ogba was completed. In 1986, Guinness launched Merit lager beer produced exclusively from locally available raw materials and to differentiate the international brands such as Stout and Harp produced by the company.

After leaving, Guinness, Ubeku took on leadership roles within the Isoko community. He was the treasurer of the People's Solidarity Party and later presidential candidate in the 1992 SDP primary. In 1997, he was chairman of the now defunct Committee of National Consensus, one of the political parties during the Sani Abacha administration.

He died on 9 March 2014 and was buried in his hometown of Araya.
