= Tim Owhefere =

Nigerian politician (1963–2021)

Hon Tim Owhefere

Member, Delta State House of Assembly representing Isoko North Constituency
- In office 10 June 2007 – 27 January 2021
- Succeeded by: Jude Ogbimi

Majority Leader, Delta State House of Assembly

Personal details
- Born: Tim Kome Owhefere; 16 June 1963
- Died: 27 January 2021 (aged 57) Federal Medical Centre, Asaba, Delta State, Nigeria
- Party: Peoples Democratic Party
- Occupation: Politician; lawyer

Tim Kome Owhefere (16 June 1963 – 27 January 2021) was a Nigerian lawyer and politician and a member of the Delta State House of Assembly representing Isoko North Constituency in the 7th Delta State House of Assembly. He also served as the Majority Leader of the Delta State House of Assembly.

== Early life and education ==
Tim Kome Owhefere was from Akiewhe-Owhe, Isoko North, Delta State, Nigeria. He started his education by attending Government College, Ughelli, Delta State, before proceeding to Delta State Polytechnic, Ozoro where he studied mass communication. He went to Yaba College of Technology where he graduated with HND in publishing and communication. He furthered his education at University of Lagos where he received a law degree and a B.L. from the Nigerian Law School. He was later called to the Nigerian bar.

== Political career ==
In 2007, Owhefere won the seat to represent Isoko North Constituency at the Delta State House of Assembly. He served as the Chief Whip, Majority Leader and the chairman, House Committee on information of Delta State House of Assembly. In April 2021, he was replaced by Jude Ogbimi.

== Death ==
Owhefere died on 27 January 2021 at Federal Medical Centre, Asaba, Delta State, Nigeria.
