= Idheze =

- Location in Nigeria
- Coordinates: 5°31′N 6°17′E
- Country: Nigeria
- State: Delta State
- Time zone: UTC+1 (WAT)

Idheze Irri is one of the towns in the Isoko South Local Government area of Delta State, Nigeria.

The town has an estimated population of over 14,500 inhabitants. The area is surrounded by swampland.

The town has several oil wells that are run by Shell Petroleum Development Company (SPDC) and Italy Eni Agip. The presence of crude oil pipelines across the region and frequent crude oil spills have been largely responsible for soil damage. This has led to large-scale frustrations with the oil companies, and has resulted in skirmishes and kidnappings for ransom in some neighboring communities. Shell Petroleum Development Company (SPDC) responds by sponsoring projects such as clean water supply in Idheze Irri town. Ultimately, regardless of its oil rich resource, it is still highly neglected by the Shell Petroleum Development Company (SPDC).

On entering the town from the direction of Ozoro, a neighboring town, you will encounter a shrine and a river called Orobe.

It has an Odion-Ologbo as the traditional head of the oldest person in the town.

Idheze Irri has two schools, Idheze primary school and a secondary school (Idheze grammar school). The major occupation of the citizens is farming.
