= Joel-Onowakpo Thomas =

Nigerian politician and chartered accountant

Senator of the Federal Republic of Nigeria from Delta South Senatorial District
- Incumbent
- Assumed office 13 June 2023
- Preceded by: James Manager
- Constituency: Delta South Senatorial District

Personal details
- Born: 27 April 1967 (age 58) Emede, Isoko South, Delta State, Nigeria

Joel-Onowakpo Thomas (born 27 April 1967) is a Nigerian chartered accountant, businessman and politician. He is the senator representing Delta South senatorial district in the 10th assembly under the platform of the All Progressive Congress. He was the first executive chairman and the fifth chief executive of Delta state Board of Internal Revenue from 24 July 2009 to 22 September 2015.

Thomas was born on 27 April 1967 in Emede, Isoko South, Delta State, Nigeria. He began his primary schooling at State Primary School, Obrigbene in Bayelsa State (1975–1979), continued at Government Secondary School, Ekeremor, and completed his secondary education at Emede Grammar School in 1984. He earned his professional accounting credentials by qualifying as a Chartered Accountant in 1994 and a Fellow of the Institute of Chartered Accountants of Nigeria in 2001; he also holds a Master’s degree in Technology Management from Ogun State University (now Olabisi Onabanjo University), completed in 1999.
