= University of Delta =

Public University in Delta State, Nigeria

- Former names: College of Education, Agbor
- Motto: Knowledge and Power
- Type: Public
- Established: 2021
- Vice-Chancellor: Prof Eric C. Eboh
- Location: Agbor, Delta State, Nigeria
- Campus: Urban
- Website: unidel.edu.ng

The University of Delta is a state university in Agbor, Delta StateThe university has three campus: Agbor(Alihame), Owa-Oyibu, and Owa-Alero.

The university offers undergraduate and postgraduate courses covering seven faculties: Agriculture, Arts, Education, Information Technology, Science, Engineering, Medicine and Law.

== History ==
The University of Delta, Agbor was first established as a College of Education in 1979 by the former Bendel State Government and with the creation of Delta State in 1991, the school became a college owned by Delta State Government.

In January 2021, Governor Ifeanyi A Okowa announced plans to convert College of Education, Agbor and two other schools into a full-fledged University. The bills had its first reading during plenary at the Delta State House of Assembly on the 28th day of January 2021.

In February 2021, the bill were passed into law after going through the house committee on Education.

While signing the bill which was passed by the State House Assembly, Governor Ifeanyi A Okowa said, “As the students of our technical education start to progress from the technical colleges to the polytechnics, they also have a chance of going further to the University of Science and Technology.”

== Notable alumni ==
- 2 Milly Star, actor and musician

== See also ==
- List of universities in Nigeria
- List of Tertiary Institutions in Delta State
- Delta State University, Abraka
- Delta State University of Science and Technology, Ozoro
- University of Benin (Nigeria)
- Dennis Osadebe University, Asaba
