= Oleh, Delta State =

Oleh
- Oleh Town
- Interactive map of Oleh

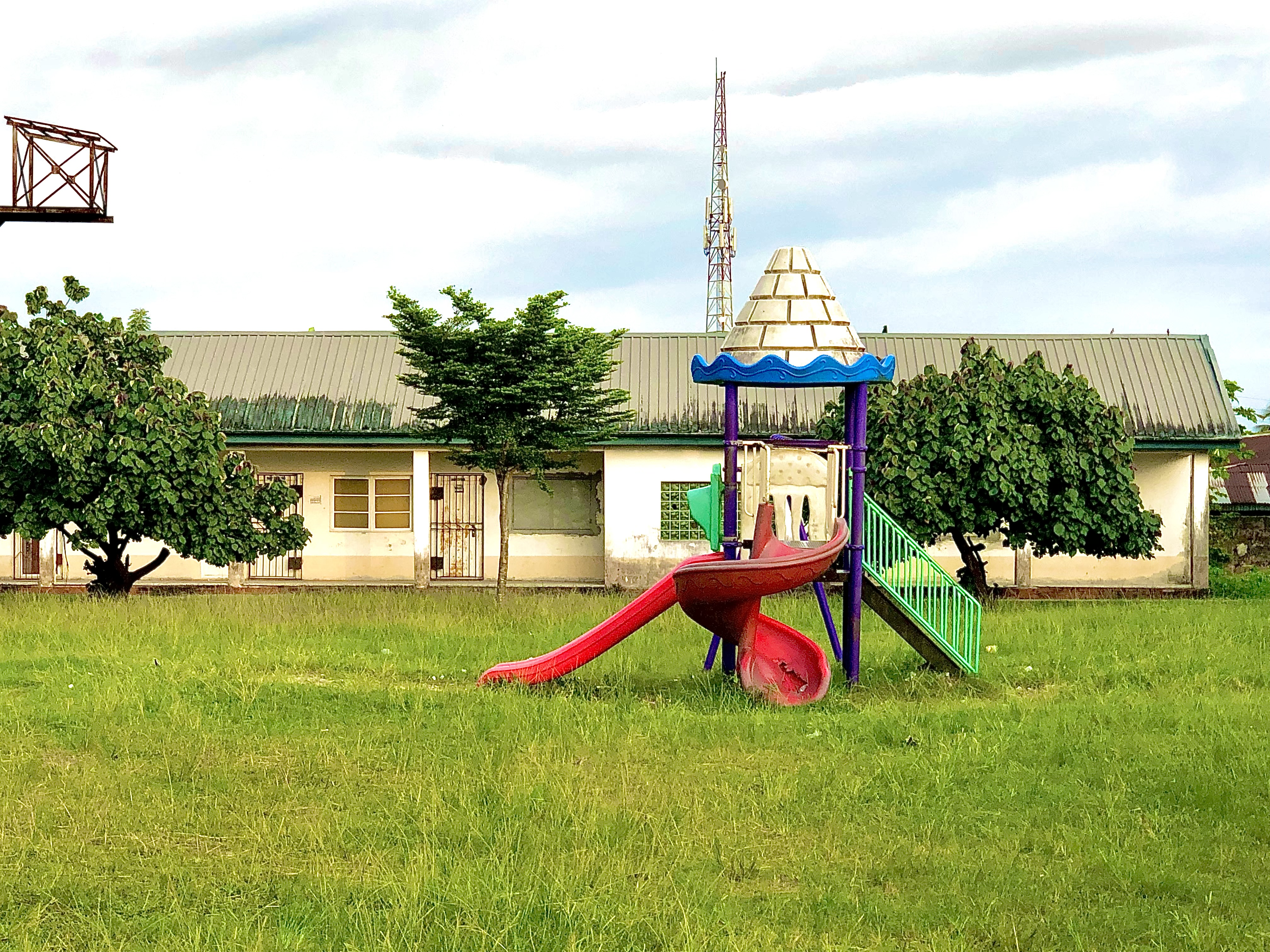
Isoko central school(ICS), Oleh. Since 1936

Oleh is the headquarters of the Isoko South Local Government Area, one of the two administrative units in the Isoko region of Delta State, Southern Nigeria.

== Politics and government ==
As the administrative center for the local government, it houses the council offices.

The town is under the leadership of a monarch, His Royal Majesty (H.R.M.) Ovrawah A. Omogha 1 (JP) FCAI, who has the power to appoint his Kinsmen (also known as Chiefs) who assist him in decision(s) making relating to the affairs of Oleh community. In addition to the monarch and his chiefs, there is also an Oleh community executives headed by an elected president. Both the community executives and the king with his chiefs work together to see to the smooth running of the community affairs. They are also the traditional custodian of the people's customs and traditions. The monarch is influential in Isokoland in matters relating to his kingdom. He is also a member of the state council of traditional rulers, which also provides him a platform for some influence on statewide issues.

== Economy ==
There are different economic classes in Oleh, ranging from civil servants, merchants, skilled and unskilled personnel and farmers. The farmers mostly specialize in food crop farming, fishery, livestock farming and sometimes hunting of bush animals. The food crops cultivated by the farmers include; cassava, maize, oil palms, plantain and yams. Women form a large proportion of the farming population. They also engage in trading of food crops for cash to meet other basic household needs. On market days, women can be seen peddling their assorted wares in the town markets. Cassava is the source of most of the foods consumed by the people. Garri, starch meal (Ozi), Egu (fufu) are cassava derivatives.

== Demographics ==
Although there is no definitive population census figure for Oleh, the town is estimated to have a population of over 20,000 people, according to a report by the National Population Commission.

== Education ==
Oleh prioritizes education, with several primary, secondary, and tertiary institutions. Notable government-owned schools include Isoko Central School, Evoja Primary School, Odoro Primary School, Owhara Primary School, Uzi Primary School, Emiye Girl's Grammar School, Emore Grammar School, and Saint Michael's College. The town is also home to the Oleh Campus of Delta State University, which offers programs in law and engineering. According to a report by the Delta State Ministry of Education, Oleh has a high literacy rate, with over 80% of residents able to read and write.

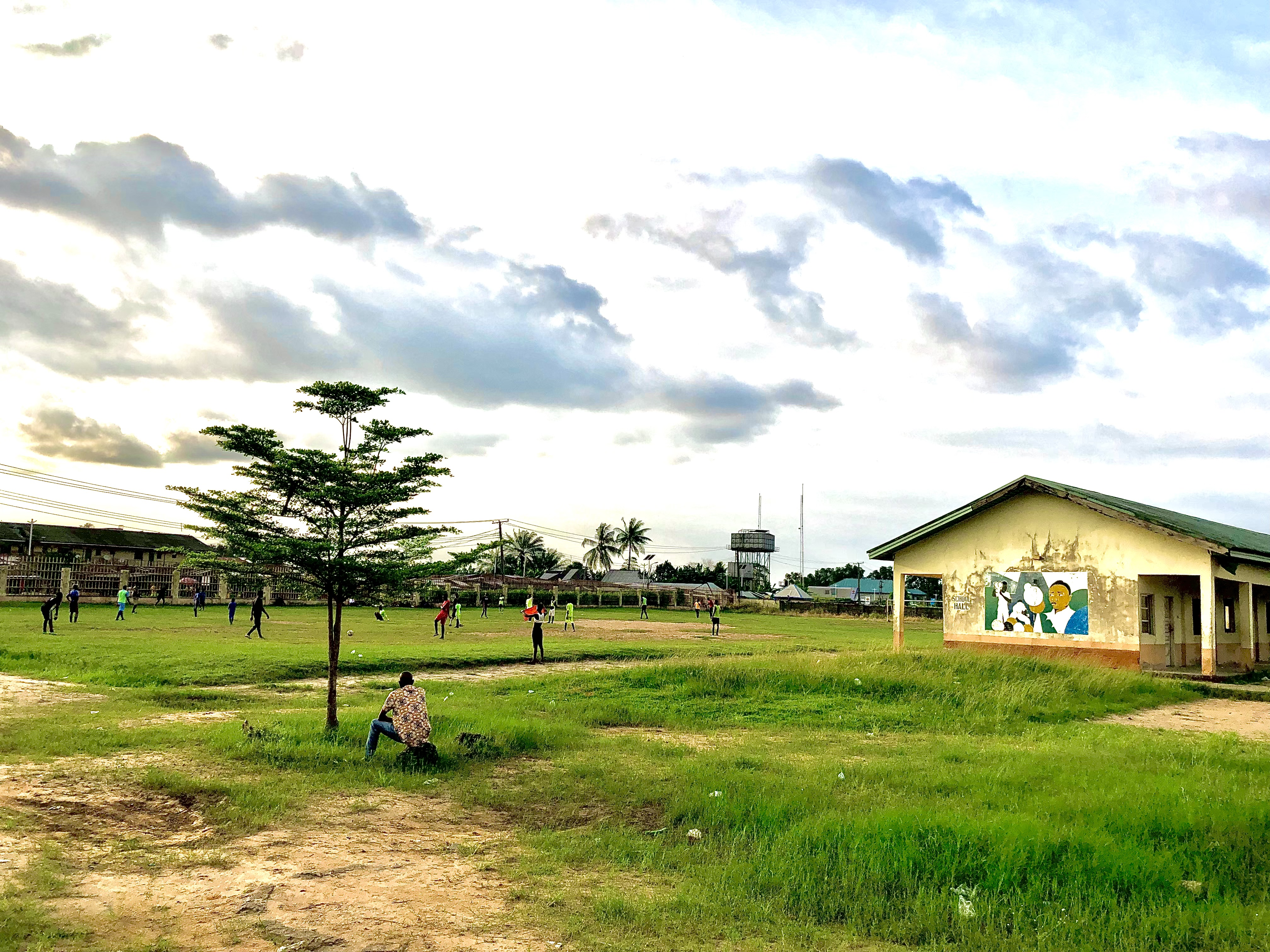
St. Michael’s College(SMC), Oleh. Founded 1939

== Flooding ==
In recent years, Oleh has faced severe flooding crises due to climate change. In 2022, the town experienced devastating floods that resulted in loss of lives and properties. The flooding also affected the town's economy, restricting vehicular movement and disrupting commercial activities. According to a report by the Nigerian Meteorological Agency, Oleh is one of the towns in Delta State most vulnerable to flooding.

== Notable people ==
1. Chief Lucky Ogba

2. Kenneth Ogba

3. Sire Matthias Ugree
