= Southern Delta University =

Public university in Ozoro, Delta State, Nigeria

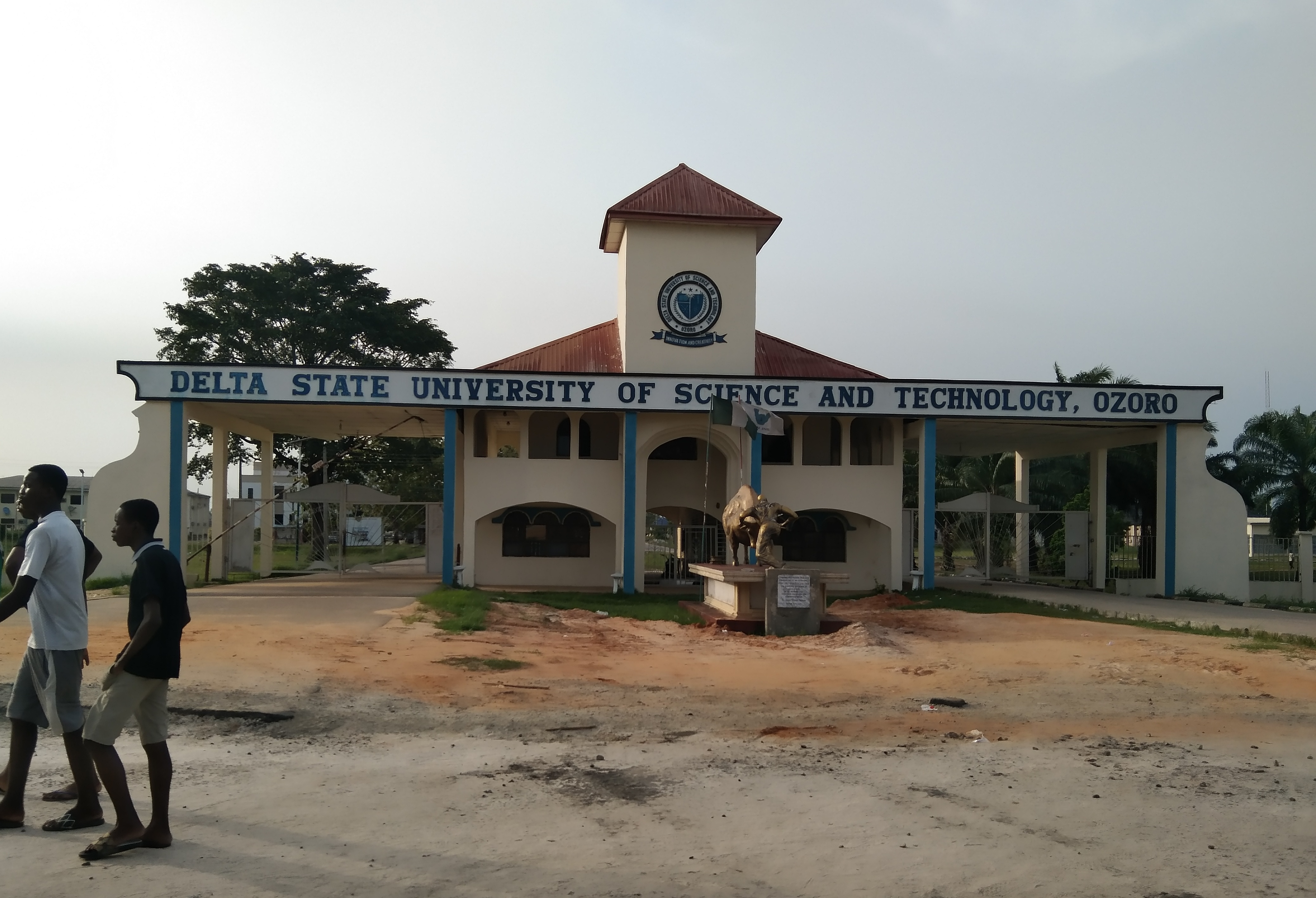
- Former names: Delta State University of Science and Technology, Ozoro
- Motto: Innovation and Creativity
- Type: Public
- Established: 2021
- Vice-Chancellor: Prof Jacob Snapps Oboreh
- Location: Ozoro, Delta State, Nigeria
- Campus: Campus 1 and Campus 2
- Website: sdu.edu.ng

The Southern Delta University (SDU) is a state-owned public university. It is located in Ozoro, Delta state, Nigeria. SDU offers undergraduate and postgraduate courses covering eleven faculties: Administration and Management, Agriculture, Arts, Basic Medical Sciences, Communication and Media Studies, Computing, Engineering, Environmental Science, Law, Science, Social Sciences.

== History ==
The Delta State University of Science and Technology, Ozoro was first established as a college of Agriculture which was turned into a Polytechnic on January 1, 2002, by law during the administration of James Ibori.

In January 2021, Governor Ifeanyi A Okowa of Delta State announced plans to convert Delta State Polytechnic, Ozoro and two other schools into a full-fledged University, the bills had its first reading during plenary at the Delta State House of Assembly on the 28th day of January 2021.

In February 2021, the bill were passed into law after going through the house committee on Education.

While signing the bill which was passed by the State House Assembly, Governor Ifeanyi A Okowa said, "As the students of our technical education start to progress from the technical colleges to the polytechnics, they also have a chance of going further to the University of Science and Technology."

== Faculties/Departments ==
Faculties

- Falculty of Law
- Faculty of Agriculture
- Faculty of Science
- Faculty of Medical Sciences
- Faculty of Engineering
- Faculty of Environmental science
- Faculty of Arts
- Faculty of Administration and Management
- Faculty of Social Sciences
- Faculty of Computing
- Faculty of Communication and Media Studies

Departments

- Agricultural Extension and Rural Development
- Animal Production and Health Services
- Fisheries Technology
- Agricultural Economics and Farm Management
- Agricultural Business
- Crop Science and Technology
- Biological Sciences
- Chemical Sciences
- Physics
- Mathematics and Statistics
- Forensic Science
- Science Laboratory Technology
- Geology
- Marine Science
- Environmental Management and Toxicology
- Petroleum Chemistry
- Petroleum Engineering
- Marine Engineering
- Gas and Oil Engineering
- Mechanical Engineering
- Civil Engineering
- Water Resources Engineering
- Agricultural Engineering
- Electrical Engineering
- Food Science and Technology
- Aerospace Engineering
- Material and Metallurgical Engineering
- Computer Science
- Cyber Security
- Software Engineering
- Information System and Technology
- Architecture
- Estate Management
- Quantity Surveying
- Surveying and Geoinformatics
- Building Technology
- Environmental Management
- Urban and Regional Planning
- Fine and Applied Arts
- Industrial Design
- Accounting and Finance
- Marketing
- Business Administration
- Entrepreneurship
- Transport Management
- Office Technology Management
- Media and Communication Management

== Notable alumni ==
- Tim Owhefere, Nigerian politician

== See also ==
- List of universities in Nigeria
- List of Tertiary Institutions in Delta State
- Delta State University, Abraka
- University of Delta, Agbor
- University of Benin (Nigeria)
- Dennis Osadebe University, Asaba
