= Evi Edna Ogholi =

Nigerian singer (born 1966)

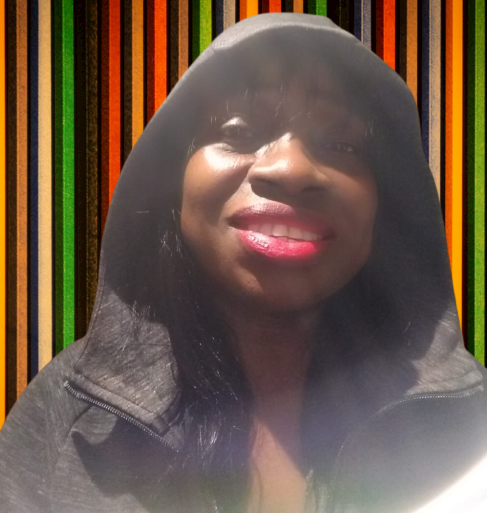

Background information
- Also known as: Africa's Queen of Reggae
- Born: 6 July 1966 (age 60); Isoko, Delta State, Nigeria
- Origin: Nigerian
- Genre: Reggae
- Occupation: Musician
- Years active: (1987–present)
- Label: Enorecords LLC
- Website: https://enorecordsllc.com

Evi Edna Ogholi (born 6 July 1966) is a Nigerian female reggae musician popular for her song "Happy Birthday".

== Early life ==
Ogholi was born on 6 July 1966 in Emede Isoko south, Delta State (then Midwest Region) to the household of Reverend R. O. Ogholirly. She married her producer and manager Emma Ogosi, and they had two children. The couple later separated, with Ogholi moving to Paris shortly after.

== Career ==
Ogholi released her debut album My Kind of Music in 1987. Emma Ogosi was her manager and producer. Her popular hits are "Happy Birthday", "Oghene Me", and "Look Before You Cross". After a long vacation from the music scene Ogholi unveiled her plans to resume to entertain her fans, during her interview with BBC Pidgin and Splash 105.5 FM Ibadan.

== APCN humanitarian awards ==
In 2020, she was honored and endorsed as the brand Ambassador of Hope and Peace to Aid People Change Nigeria Charity and Orphanage Organisation in Nigeria and Ireland to host Nigeria and Ireland largest humanitarian 12th edition award event.

== Other names ==
Ogholi earned the recognition 'Queen of Nigeria reggae' firstly from a Nigerian reggae music legend blessed memory of Majek Fashek to later be known globally with her act. She told BBC Pidgin during her interview that her reggae wristband was a gift from Majek Fashek to her, after they finished recording with their band in a studio section in Lagos. She was later known for other names like 'Africa's Queen Of Reggae', a nickname she earned from fans in west Africa, after she released three albums that went platinum.

== Endorsement ==
Ogholi was an ambassador for Pepsi in 1990, and featured in a commercial for the brand with Yvonne Chaka Chaka, Charly Boy, and Femi Kuti.

== Controversy ==
After Ogholi left the Nigerian music scene in 1990 she volunteered for UNICEF in France for almost nineteen years. Rumors circulated on Instagram, Facebook and blogs that she had died were dispelled in 2020 and Nigerian national journalists contacted her for a press release.

== Record deal ==
In 2020 she signed a five-year record deal with Enorecords owned by Nigeria reggae singer Winning Jah. In August 2020, she released an EP under the imprint, titled Peace and Love which included a remix of her most popular song 'Happy Birthday'. The EP was produced, mixed and mastered by the label's in-house producer Ayemere Joshua, commonly known by his stage name 'Jossy Joe'.

== Discography ==
- My Kind Of Music (LP, Album) Polydor POLP 157 1987
- On The Move Polydor 1988
- Happy Birthday (LP, Album) Polydor POLP 197 1988
- No Place Like Home Polydor 1989
- Bursting Loose (LP, Album) Margenta (2) MGTLP 001 1990
- Step By Step (LP, Album) Polydor POLP 247 1990
- Peace and Love (LP, Album) Enorecords LLC 2020

== Legacy ==
Today, Ogholi's legacy is seen to have "had a lasting impact on Nigerian music", as she is considered as "inspiring a new generation of artists and bringing the essence of Isoko culture into mainstream Nigerian music".

== See also ==
- Ras Kimono
- Majek Fashek
