= Isoko South =

- LGA
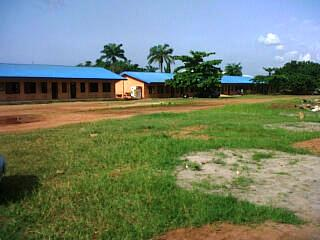
- Interactive map of Isoko South
- Country: Nigeria
- State: Delta State
- Headquarters: Oleh

Area
  - Total: 668 km^{2} (258 sq mi)

Population (2006)
  - Total: 235,147
  - Density: 352/km^{2} (912/sq mi)
- Time zone: UTC+1 (WAT)

Isoko South is a local government area (LGA) in the Isoko region of Delta State, Nigeria. With its headquarters at Oleh, Nigeria. It is one of the two local governments that make up the Isoko region. The other is Isoko North, which has its headquarters at Ozoro. This LGA has a total population of 235,147 as at the 2006 census.

== History ==
The Isoko people migrated historically from the Benin Kingdom in nearby Edo State, and therefore share some cultural similarities with this state. The area later formed part of Bendel State, before Bendel State was split to form Edo and Delta states.

The Isoko South and North Local Government Area was established on 23 September 1991, when the former Isoko Local Government Area was subdivided. The area produces a large component of the oil and gas resources of Delta State.

== Geography ==
The Isoko South Local Government Area covers a low-lying section of the larger Niger Delta Basin, interspersed with streams, canals and rivers. It is located in a region of deciduous and evergreen forests, with patches of mangrove forest, as well as a forest reserve along the Aviara clan area.

== Demographics ==
The local population are primarily of the Isoko people. There are eleven communities in Isoko South, and each of them are subdivided into several clans. Communities inhabiting Isoko South include the Aviara, Olomoro, Emede, Enhwe, Erowha, Igbide, Irri, Okpolo, Oleh, Delta, Umeh and Uzere. The Isoko language is predominant in much of the area.

The traditional occupation of the people of Isoko South is fishing and agriculture.

Current population centres include Oleh town - the seat of the Isoko South government - as well as the Olomoro urban community.

== Names of monarchs and their titles in Isoko South ==
The different communities in Isoko South Local Government Area are being governed by a monarch constituted by the Delta State government. Their names and titles are as follow:

1. H.R.M. Ewhiri II,
  The Ovie of Emede Kingdom
  Monarch governing Emede Community.
2. H.R.M. Udogri I (JP),
  The Ovie of Uzere Kingdom.
  Monarch governing Uzere Kingdom.
3. H.R.M. Obukeni I (JP),
  The Ovie of Igbide Kingdom,
  Monarch governing Igbide Community.
4. H.R.M. Ambrose O. Owhe (JP),
  The Odio-ologbo of Umeh Kingdom.
  Monarch governing Umeh Community.
5. H.R.M. Ovrawah A. Omogha 1 (JP) FCAI,
  The Odio-ologbo of Community.
  Monarch governing Oleh Community.
6. H.R.M. Samuel Otidi,
  The Odio-ologbo of Okpolo Kingdom.
  Monarch governing Okpolo Community.
7. H.R.M. Harry Emaviwe,
  The Ovie of Aviara Kingdom.
  Monarch governing Aviara Community.
8. H.R.M. Anthony O. Efekodha (MNSE, FMHR),
  Ejuzi II, The Ovie of Enwhe Kingdom.
  Monarch governing Enwhe Community.
9. H.R.M. Kenneth Onomeregwae,
  The Odio-ologbo of Erowha Kingdom.
  Monarch governing Erowha Community.
10. H.R.M. Josiah Umukoro,
  Aghaza 1, The Odio-ologbo of Olomoro Kingdom.
  Monarch governing Olomoro Community.
11. H.R.M. Joshua Aghagba,
  The Odio-ologbo of Irri Kingdom.
  Monarch governing Irri Community.

== Isoko South Local Government List of Divisional Officers, Residents, Sole Administrators and Chairmen ==
Since the creation of Isoko south local government, it has been governed by different officers ranging from divisional officers to residents, sole administrators and chairmen.

S/No.	Names of Governing Officers	Position	Date
1.	Hon. J.E. Otobo	Chairman	23 May 1958 to 19 November 1959
2.	Mr. F.O. Omodior	Chairman	20 November 1959 to 3 June 1960
3.	Mr. J.K. Oziwo	Chairman	4 June 1960 to 20 August 1961
4.	Chief J.U.E. Agbaza	Chairman	21 August 1961 to 30 November 1968
5.	Mr. F.I. Ikpefan	Divisional Officer	
6.	Mr. J.A. Otutu	Divisional Officer	
7.	Mr. R.A. Okaka	Divisional Officer	21 August 1971 to 23 September 1971
8.	Mr. J.O. Uponi	Divisional Officer	24 September 1971 to 30 May 1974
9.	Mr. J.Y. Sule	Divisional Officer	1 June 1974 to 30 November 1974
10.	Mr. F.O. Ekemike	Residents	1 December 1974 to 11 December 1975
11.	Chief S.O. Akpotu	Chairman	15 January 1976 to 31 December 1976
12.	Mr. F.O. Aimufua	Residents	1 June 1977 to 31 August 1977
13.	Chief J.O. Omu	Chairman	1 September 1977 to 10 September 1979
14.	Chief G.O. Akpojene	Chairman	1 December 1979 to 28 February 1982
15.	Mr. J.A. Agware	Chairman	1 March 1982 to 30 September 1983
16.	Mr. S.O. Okoroze	Chairman	1 October 1983 to 1 December 1983
17.	Mr. S.O. Ogoh	Sole Administrator	1 February 1984 to 11 February 1986
18.	Major E.U. Uzamere Ex. Na	Chairman	12 February 1986 to 28 June 1986
19.	Mr. E.O. Eziashi	Sole Administrator	31 June 1986 to 31 December 1986
20.	Mr. J.I. Ukpedor	Sole Administrator	1 January 1987 to 31 December 1987
21.	Mr. M.C.O. Eto	Chairman	11 January 1988 to 31 July 1989
22.	Mr. L.E. Ejohwomu	Chairman	1 September 1989 to 31 December 1990
23.	Mr. P.O. Oju	Chairman	1 January 1991 to 16 September 1991
24.	Mr. P.F. Fuludu	Sole Administrator	30 September 1991 to 2 December 1991
25.	Mr. J.E. Osima	Chairman	30 December 1991 to 8 November 1993
26.	Major G.O. Igbehen	Chairman	7 April 1994 to 29 March 1996
27.	Chief Iduh G. Amadhe	Chairman	30 March 1996 to 23 March 1997
28.	Mr. Benjamin Ogbalor	Chairman	24 March 1997 to 20 July 1998
29.	Dr M. Ebereme	Sole Administrator	23 July 1998 to 20 September 1998
30.	Dr M. Ebereme	Chairman	21 September 1998 to 2 June 1999
31.	Hon. Mike E.B. Igbuku	Chairman	3 June 1999 to 2 June 2002
32.	Hon. Fegurson Onwo	Chairman	24 July 2002 to 24 June 2003
33.	Arc. Joe Iroro	Chairman	26 June 2003 to 26 December 2003
34.	Arc. Joe Iroro	Chairman	19 April 2004 to 19 April 2007
35.	Hon. Joel Onowakpo	Chairman	17 October 2007 to 13 May 2008
36.	Hon. (Chief) Askia Ogieh (JP)	Chairman	13 May 2008 to 13 May 2011
37.	Hon. Goodluck Idele	Chairman	27 October 2012 to 27 October 2014
38.	Sir (Hon.) Itiako C. Ikpokpo	Chairman	27 October 2014 to 27 October 2017
39.	Sir (Hon.) Itiako C. Ikpokpo	Chairman	8 January 2018 to 5 January 2021
40.	Hon. Victor Asasa	Chairman	8 March 2021 till Date

== Landmarks and attractions ==
Of the tourist areas, The Araya Bible Site whose origin is traceable to the Anglican Adam Preaching Society founded by Cornelius Adam Igbudu (1914-1981), the Eni of Uzere and the sandbeaches of Ivrogbo are popular.

The cultural attractions of the area include a range of traditional festivals, crafts (such as the distinctive pottery made from the local kaolin clays), the traditional clothing and a strong culture of hospitality.

The area's festivals include the Oliho Festival of the Oleh kingdom, the Omode festival of Iri, the Ivri of Olomoro, the Idhu and Abarne of Igbide, the Osia of Umeh, the Ogwa-Enwhe of the Enwhe kingdom, the Oniowise of Emede, the Ovore of Erowha, the Uloho of Orie and the popular Eni of the Uzere Kingdom.

== Environmental challenges and projects ==
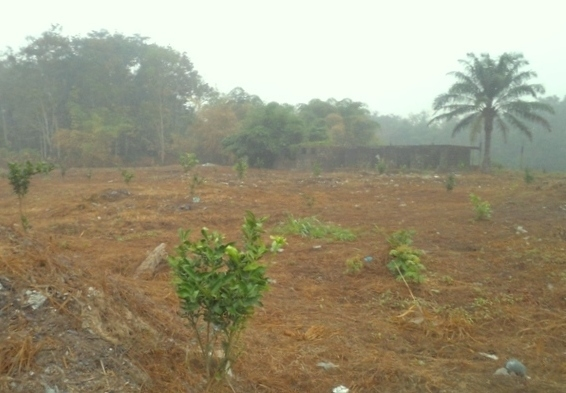
Local tree planting in Isoko South LGA.

Oil and gas exploration activities began in the area in the early 1950s, and the second oil well in Nigeria was discovered in Uzere, Isoko South, in 1958. The massive growth of the oil and gas industries has created significant environmental challenges, and have been a source of much concern for the local government.

Challenges such as gas flaring, oil spills from pipelines, deforestation and waste miss-management have been made more serious by federal laws which centralise control of the oil rich land and allow local government relatively little control over activities. Due to such concerns, in 2001, the Isoko South Local Government joined ICLEI - Local Governments for Sustainability, the first local government in Nigeria to do so.

The local government has since engaged in extensive project work to combat the effects of oil and gas pollution. It has promulgated a law that makes Environmental Impact Assessments (EIA) compulsory for all developmental and industrial projects, and has also carried out environmental auditing with environmental regulators and NGOs in the local government area. Large tree planting projects have also been launched in collaboration with community-based organisations and with UNDP GEF/SGP support.

== Notable people ==
- Kenneth Ogba, politician
- Cornelius Adam Igbudu (1914-1981), founder of the Anglican Adam Preaching Society
- Abel Ubeku (1936-2014), Nigerian businessman and politician
- Gen. Alexander Ogomudia, retired Nigerian Army general who served as Chief of Defence Staff of Nigeria from 2003 to 2006 and Chief of Army Staff from 2001 to 2003.
- Joel-Onowakpo Thomas, Nigerian chartered accountant, businessman and politician. He is the senator representing Delta South senatorial district in the 10th assembly under the platform of the All Progressives Congress. He was the first executive chairman and the fifth chief executive of Delta State Board of Internal Revenue from 24 July 2009 to 22 September 2015.
- Paul Ufuoma Omu (July 1940 – 29 April 2025), Nigerian Major General, politician, and former Military Governor of South-Eastern State (1975–1978).
- Stella Omu (born 1946), Nigerian politician, elected Senator for Delta South Senatorial District in 1999 under the People's Democratic Party (PDP).

== See also ==
- Oleh, Delta
- Isoko region
