= Umeh =

Umeh can be both a masculine given name and a surname. Notable people with the name include:

== Given name ==
- Umeh Emmanuel (born 2004), Nigerian football forward
- Umeh Kalu, Nigerian legal practitioner

== Surname ==
- Amaka Umeh, Nigerian actor
- Becky Umeh, Nigerian choreographer, actress, and dancer
- Emeka Umeh (born 1999), Nigerian football forward
- Franco Umeh (born 2005), Irish football winger and forward
- Genoveva Umeh, Nigerian actress
- Godson Umeh, British Nigerian jeweler and entrepreneur
- Jaden Umeh (born 2008), Nigerian-Irish football forward
- John Anenechukwu Umeh, professor of estate management at the University of Nigeria
- Michael Umeh (born 1984), Nigerian-American basketball player
- Stella Umeh (born 1975), Canadian former artistic gymnast
- Sobe Charles Umeh, Nigerian-Canadian director
- Victor Umeh, Nigerian politician

== See also ==
- Sabina Umeh-Akamune, Nigerian singer-songwriter and model
