= Oghara-Iyede =

Village in Isoko North Local Government Area of Delta State, Nigeria

Oghara-Iyede is a village in Isoko North Local Government Area of Delta State, Nigeria. The town has an educational institution called the Atebo Primary School.

== Notable people ==
- Sunny Ofehe, environmental rights activist

== See also ==
- Oghara
