= Uro, Delta State =

Coordinates: 5°27′44″N 6°19′04″E

Uro is a town in Nigeria, in Isoko South Local Government Area in Delta State. It has an estimated population of 3,500 people. It is bordered by Ada, Okpe-Isoko, Ivrogbo and Ekpe. Uro is also actively involved in politics, as a result, they produced the incumbent chairman of the Isoko South council in person of Hon. Malik Ikpokpo, headquarters at Oleh. uro has also, at one time produced the councilor representing Irri Ward 2 at the council in Oleh, in person of Hon.Blessing Ese.

Uro is also recognized by the neighboring towns for their active football sport team known as {Altimate stars} of Uro, captained by Samson Sammy Oneke (a.k.a. OPALE). The football team produced the best goalkeeper of the 2008 Efemona Efekodo football competition in person of Ese Ali (a.k.a. AGALI). Other notable players include Lucky Okpeta (a.k.a. MILICO), Kenneth Onabo, Uche Livingstone, Pimaro Ogaga, Iruoghene Efe, Monday Seemehapy, etc. The people of Uro are also known and loved by others for their hospitality and open-mindedness. In fact, they are known as the most peaceable people in Irri clan. This is as a result of the governing strategy implored in piloting the affairs of the community. There is the over-all eldest man and woman known as the 'ODIO' with their council members. There is the community chairman and chairlady, and the President General of the Community.

On the other hand, there is the students' union president, who is charged with the mandate of maintaining peace and order among the students and also to keep the Uro Community Town Hall clean at all times. They organize a yearly ceremony known as the Students' Union party which takes place every 27 December. There is also the youth chairman, who is charged with the mandate of keeping law and order among the youths and to keep the roads leading in and out of the community clean. Uro has a working central governance with delegated arms to keep the system running. The annual general meeting of Uro community usually takes place around the month of August. This A.G.M meeting usually attracts indigens within and in the diaspora.

It is the first town in the region to have electricity via a generator and the first town to have secondary school in Isoko South, called Uro Grammar School. It also has one primary school called Atanaru Primary School. Uro has produced some fine academicians, bankers and lawyers. These lawyers include Barrister (Dr.) Felix E. Eboibi and Barrister Foster Eloho Odojor.

Most inhabitants are Christians with a minority of followers of a native religion. Most inhabitants are farmers and some of Uro's nonresident indigenes are found in Lagos, Warri, Ughelli, Benin, Ijebu-Ode and Asaba.
