= Akpofure Rim-Rukeh =

Nigerian Professor and VC of FUPRE

Vice chancellor of Federal University of Petroleum Resources Effurun
- Incumbent
- Assumed office 2020
- Preceded by: Prof Akii Ibhadode

Acting Vice Chancellor of Federal University of Petroleum Resources Effurun
- Incumbent
- Assumed office 2020

Deputy Vice Chancellor of Federal University of Petroleum Resources Effurun
- Incumbent
- Assumed office 2019

Personal details
- Born: Akpofure Rim-Rukeh
- Party: Non-Partisan
- Spouse: Mercy Akpofure Rim-Rukeh

Akpofure Rim-Rukeh is a Nigerian professor of Microbial Corrosion and Environmental Studies who was the former deputy Vice Chancellor of Federal University of Petroleum Resources Effurun and currently the 4th substantive vice chancellor of same school.

== Early life and background ==
Akpofure Rim-Rukeh obtained his BSc with a degree in biochemistry from University of Port-Harcourt in 1986 and obtained Postgraduate Diploma in chemical engineering from University of Benin in 1993. In 1998, he got his master's degree in chemical engineering from the University of Port-Harcourt and obtained another Postgraduate Diploma in Education from Delta State University, Abraka in 2004. In 2008, he got his PhD in chemical engineering from Rivers State University of Science and Technology.

== Career ==
In March 2020, Akpofure was selected by the governing council of the Federal University of Petroleum Resources, Effurun to be the Vice Chancellor which was later approved by President Mohammadu Buhari.

== Personal life ==
Akpofure Rim-Rukeh is married to Mercy Akpofure Rim-Rukeh and they have three kids together.
