= Aviara =

Isoko kingdom in Delta State, Nigeria

- Kingdom
- Location in Nigeria
- Coordinates: 5°24′04″N 6°15′42″E
- Country: Nigeria
- State: Delta

Government

Aviara is an Isoko kingdom in Delta State, southern Nigeria. The current king is H.R.M. Michael Efeareduo Ebobo - Imoh 1 (the Ovie of Aviara kingdom).

Araya is located in Aviara clan in the Isoko region of Delta State, Nigeria. It is home to The Araya Bible Site which was linked to the 1914 birth of Cornelius Adam Igbudu, the late founder of the Anglican Adam Preaching Society.

His evangelistic activities in Aviara seemed to have increased the popularity of the Araya Bible Site.
