= Evangelist (Anglican Church) =

A commissioned Evangelist in the Anglican Communion is a lay person who has received professional training in Christian outreach ministry, and been commissioned by episcopal authority. In practice, almost all those formally admitted to the office of Evangelist are members of the Anglican mission and outreach agency, the Church Army. Evangelist is one of the commonly acknowledged lay ministries of the Anglican Communion internationally, along with the ministries of Lay reader, and Deaconess.

== Christian evangelism ==
Evangelism is a universal Christian practice, and all baptised Christians have a role in the work of propagating the Christian Gospel. In this sense, all Christians are evangelists. The Bible makes reference to certain individuals having a specific ministry under the title evangelist, for example, Ephesians 4:11, "The gifts he gave were that some would be apostles, some prophets, some evangelists, some pastors and teachers." It is possible that certain early Christians bore the title evangelist within the Christian community, for which Acts 21:8 is often cited: "The next day we left and came to Caesarea; and we went into the house of Philip the evangelist, one of the seven, and stayed with him."

In the contemporary Anglican Church, many lay people carry out specific ministries of evangelism, and some have formed support groups or formal associations to promote their work together, such as the Fellowship for Parish Evangelism.

On 11 October 1999 the Archbishop of Canterbury and the Archbishop of York formally inaugurated the "College of Evangelists" which "exists to recognise and affirm evangelists whose ministry is nationwide or at least beyond the confines of any diocese", and is supported by the Church Army. The College of Evangelists provides a central forum for those formally admitted to the office of evangelist, and those who have undergone local training and admission to a particular ministry on a more informal basis.

== Office of Evangelist ==
In 1882 the Revd Wilson Carlile founded the Church Army, commissioning a number of officers to work in outreach projects. A number of similar organisations were also being founded within the Church of England, and Carlile advanced the case for the formal recognition of an office of Evangelist within the ministry of the Anglican Church. In 1883 the office was acknowledged.

Candidates for the office of evangelist are selected through the Church Army, in a process of profiling, interviewing, and practical placements, usually lasting from 18 to 24 months. Those selected then receive formal training, which was previously residential training at the Church Army College, originally in Oxford, then in Blackheath (from the 1960s), and finally in Sheffield (from the 1990s).

Today most candidates in Britain and Ireland train part-time over several years, with the training including residential courses at the Sheffield headquarters of Church Army Britain & Ireland. Church Army organisations in other parts of the world (Church Army Africa, Church Army Australia, Church Army Barbados, Church Army Jamaica, Church Army New Zealand, Church Army United States; and Threshold Ministries, previously Church Army Canada) have similar training courses for evangelists within their jurisdictions.

Although Church Army officers are selected and trained by the Church Army, most are deployed for subsequent work by local parishes and dioceses. When training is complete, the candidate is formally commissioned to the office of evangelist by a bishop. In the Church of England, where the office originated, all commissioned evangelists receive their licence directly from the Archbishop of the Province in which they are commissioned (the Archbishop of York in northern England, or the Archbishop of Canterbury in southern England), even though their ministry will be approved and supervised by the bishop of the local diocese in which they are posted. The commissioning of evangelists sometimes takes place at the Archbishops' official residences of Bishopthorpe Palace and Lambeth Palace.

== Liturgical role ==
The ministry of an evangelist is primarily a pastoral one. Nonetheless, most commissioned evangelists are attached to a parish church, and may have a liturgical role, particularly in preaching. Commissioned evangelists who are robed for a formal liturgy are entitled to wear a cherry red tippet, traditionally of the short "collar" type. In some parts of the Anglican Communion, including Africa and the Caribbean, these traditional collar tippets are still commonly worn. In other parts, including the British Isles, there is an increasing tendency for a full length tippet (also known as a "preaching scarf") in cherry red to be worn by commissioned evangelists. In other areas, including North America, commissioned evangelists rarely wear any liturgical clothing.
