= Ethiope West =

- LGA
- Interactive map of Ethiope West
- Coordinates: 5°36′N 6°00′E
- Country: Nigeria
- State: Delta State
- Headquarters: Oghara Town

Government
  - Local Government Chairman: Monday Odinigwe

Area
  - Total: 536 km^{2} (207 sq mi)

Population (2006)
  - Total: 203,592
  - Density: 380/km^{2} (984/sq mi)
- Time zone: UTC+1 (WAT)
- Postal code: 331

Ethiope West is a Local Government Area of Delta State, Nigeria. Its headquarters are in the town of Oghara Town.

It has an area of 536 km^{2} and a population of 203,592 at the 2006 census.

The postal code of the area is 331.
