= Splash FM (Nigeria) =

Radio station in Ibadan, Nigeria

Splash 105.5 FM Ibadan
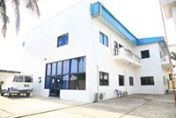

Ibadan; Nigeria
- Frequency: 105.5 MHz

Programming
- Languages: Yoruba, English, Pidgin English

Ownership
- Owner: West Midlands Communications Limited

History
- First air date: 22 March 2007

Links
- Webcast: Listen live (via TuneIn)
- Website: splashfm1055.com

Splash FM (105.5 MHz) is a radio station in Ibadan, Oyo State, Nigeria. The station broadcasts a full-service format with local news, talk programmes and music. It is owned by West Midlands Communications Limited.

== History ==
The station was founded by Chief Adebayo Muritala Akande, the "Agbaakin Olubadan of Ibadan Land", and began broadcasting on 22 March 2007. It was the first independent radio station in the city of Ibadan.

The station's main objective is to bridge the gap between the existing station and the populace in Ibadan by fulfilling the major responsibilities of broadcasting, entertainment and public enlightenment. In view of this, it was rebranded the "Integrity Station" or "Radio Omoluabi" in Yoruba on 25 August 2008 by the Independent Corrupt Practices Commission (ICPC).

== Marathon ==
The Splash FM/ICPC Integrity Marathon is organized annually by Splash FM and the ICPC. It celebrates the station's anniversary and sensitizes the public to the fight against corruption in Nigerian society.

== Notable presenters ==
- Edmund Obilo
- Tunde Olawuwo
- Oluwaseun Akinola
- Olanrewaju Adewusi
