= Cornelius Adam Igbudu =

Nigerian Anglican evangelist

Cornelius Adam Igbudu (1914–1981) was a Nigerian religious figure known for founding the Anglican Adam Preaching Society (AAPS), an evangelical group in the Anglican Church of Nigeria. He was credited with healing ability.

== Legacy ==
The Nigerian independent churches God's Grace Ministry and New Glory Revival Ministry were traced back to the evangelistic ministry of Igbudu in the Nigerian Anglican Church. Igbudu was promoted to the status of a saint, and a church was named after him (St. Adam's Anglican Church at Oghio in the Olomu area of Delta State, Nigeria). A secondary school in Araya (Adam Igbudu Memorial Secondary School) and a bible school in Emevor (Adam Igbudu Christian Institute) were named after him.

The Anglican Adam Preaching Society (AAPS) has not gone defunct along with Igbudu in 1981. He was said to have had a disagreement with a prominent Nigerian Isoko cleric, Archbishop Christian Aggrey Apena, whom he accused of "disturbing his ministry" in the Nigerian Anglican Church.

In 1992, Michael Y. Nabofa wrote a book about his life, titled Adam: The Evangelist. In May 1998, Sam U. Erivwo wrote that Igbudu was held "in very high regard" by Bishop Agori Iwe, his contemporary.

Igbudu was also remembered for his remarkable contribution to the spread of Christianity in Nigeria through the Anglican Adam Preaching Society.

== History ==
Igbudu was born to Igbudu Etatimi and Ajeminemu around 1914 and hailed from the village of Araya, whose predominant religion at the time was African traditional religion.

Igbudu later converted to Christianity and joined the Anglican Church of Nigeria, where he was ordained an evangelist.

Apart from his evangelical exploits, Igbudu was also noted for his composition of Isoko gospel songs, that have become known today as 'Kirimomo'.

Described by E. Onosemuode as "a great musical reformer among Isoko and Urhobo Christians", Igbudu's name continues to be seen as being among those "who could be regarded as pioneers" of indigenous African music, much later with others such as Evi Edna Ogholi and Kefee Obareki Don Momoh emerging.

The Isoko gospel songs otherwise known as 'Kirimomo' or 'Ebio' were originally Igbudu's style of music in Isokoland and beyond, which has since become a Christian native air genre of both the Isoko and Urhobo people in Delta State. They were mainly sung by the evangelistic choral groups of the A.A.P.S., especially at open-air crusades and during church revival programmes, in the Isoko tunes of the South-South of Nigeria.

The evangelistic campaigns of Igbudu made him tour rural areas in Isokoland and beyond, preaching about salvation and renunciation of idol worship. He was also said to have "visited church after church winning converts and strengthening believers".

== Death and burial ==
Igbudu died aged 67 on 12 March 1981 and was buried at his compound at Araya on 4 April 1981.

== See also ==
- Anglican Adam Preaching Society
- Joseph Ayo Babalola
- Cyril Odutemu
- Onyeka Onwenu
- Junior Pope
