= Isoko North =

- LGA
- Interactive map of Isoko North
- Country: Nigeria
- State: Delta State
- Headquarters: Ozoro

Government
  - Hon.: Emmanuel Egbabor

Population (2006)
  - Total: 143,559
- Time zone: UTC+1 (WAT)

Isoko North is one of two Local Government Areas (LGA) in the Isoko region of Delta State, southern Nigeria – the other being Isoko South. The population of Isoko North was 143,559 as of the 2006 Nigerian census. Its headquarters are in the town of Ozoro, which has 14,000 seater capacity Olympic size stadium at the Delta State Polytechnic Ozoro, now upgraded to a University. There are 13 Electoral Wards in the Local Government Area. Major towns in Isoko North are Ozoro, Oyede, Odoga-Oyede, Owhelogbo, Otor Owhe, Oghara-Iyede and Emevor. The people are mostly Christian and traditional worshippers. Isoko North contains oil producing regions, and is the location of some of the recent conflict in the Niger Delta.

== Towns and villages ==
- Emevor
- Oghara-Iyede
- Otor-Owhe
- Owhelogbo
- Oyede
- Odoga-Oyede
- Ellu
- Iyede-Ame
- Ofagbe
- Ozoro
- Bethel
- Igbuku
- Ibrede

== Notable people ==
- Tim Owhefere, Nigerian politician
