= Oyede =

Town in Isoko North, Delta State, Nigeria

Oyede is a town in Isoko North, a Local Government Area in Delta State, Nigeria.
