= Nigerian Upstream Petroleum Regulatory Commission =

Department of the federal government of Nigeria

- Formation: 2021
- Headquarters: Abuja
- Commission Chief Executive: Gbenga Komolafe
- Website: https://www.nuprc.gov.ng/

Nigerian Upstream Petroleum Regulatory Commission (also known as The Commission), a new entity formed as a result of the enactment of the Petroleum Industry Act 2021. The organization was formed after an extraction of the 'Upstream division' of the former sole industry regulator Department of Petroleum Resources (DPR), is a department under the Nigerian Federal Ministry of Petroleum Resources (FMPR). Its sister regulator - The Nigerian Midstream Petroleum Regulatory Authority (NMDPRA) was formed as a result of the merger of the "midstream and downstream division" of the defunct DPR, the defunct PPPRA, and the defunct Petroleum Equalization Fund (Management) Board. It monitors the upstream arm of the oil and gas industry to ensure compliance with relevant regulations and laws. As part of its activities, the agency manages the upstream sector of Nigeria petroleum industry. The Federal Government of Nigeria introduces National Production Monitoring Systems (NIPMS) to monitor the royalty payables and demand notices from all organizations dealing in petroleum in Nigeria.

== Overview ==
DPR started as Hydrocarbon section under the Ministry of Lagos Affairs, with direct supervision from the Governor-General. In 1970, the name DPR was carved out due to the expansion of activities in the ministry. By the beginning of 1971 the FGN created Nigerian National Oil Corporation (NNOC), to manage commercial operational activities in the petroleum industry. The department became the MPR in 1975. In 1977, the Nigerian National Petroleum Corporation (NNPC) was formed by the decree 33 of 1977 through the merger of MPR and NNOC. It also, led to the creation of Petroleum Inspectorate, the industry regulator. In 1985, the MPR was carved out of NNOC while NNPC remains. In the same year, the PI was moved back to the MPR.

The Petroleum Industry Act (PIA) signed by President Muhammadu Buhari in 2021 established the Nigerian Upstream Petroleum Regulatory Commission (NUPRC) replacing the Upstream division of the Department of Petroleum Resource (DPR).
