= Igbide =

Igbide is an Isoko clan located in the Isoko South Local Government Area of Delta State, Nigeria.

The predominant occupation of the Igbide is fishing and farming especially of cassava and groundnuts. The fishing is done mainly in the Urie lake, Owodokpokpo. In the first week of February the clan holds a festival on the Urie marking the start of the fishing season. Cultivation, mainly of cassava and groundnuts, is also undertaken by the Igbide.

While popular folklore has it that the Igbide people migrated from Mgbidi in the Eastern (Igbo) part of Nigeria, the founder of igbide was a migrant in Igbo land, A reversed migration took place. We all believe igbide is of Benin Origin not Igbo, some recent writers attribute their origins to Awka in present day Anambra state with a blend of later immigrants from Uvwie (Effurun) in Delta State, and the salutation sequence and chants as well as the mercantile nature of a typical Igbide man. The Igbide people took early to Christianity. Owodokpokpo, a community in Igbide clan, is regarded as one of the main entry points of Christianity into Isoko land.

Igbide is also an oil producing community and host to Shell's Oroni oilfield.
