= Igbuku =

- Location in Nigeria
- Coordinates: 5°37′N 6°25′E
- Country: Nigeria
- State: Delta State

Igbuku is a community in Ndokwa East Local Government Area of Delta State, Nigeria. It is located on the shores of the River Ase. Igbuku shares a common boundary with Ofagbe, Ovrode, Ibrede, Aboh, and Ashaka. The town is made up of descendants from Ellu, Ofagbe, Ibrede and Aradhe with some Ndokwa migrants. The native language of the people is Ukwuani, however, there has been huge migration from neighbouring isoko communities in the last decades. As at 2026, its mostly Igbuku indigenes above 80 years old that speak Ukwuani, the local language has become Isoko.

Igbuku Town is ruled by the Ozu, who is a recognized, gazetted traditional ruler in Nigeria. Igbuku's population is 3,500. The town has a primary school, post office, and a maternity/dispensary. The roads are passable by car with clear roads to Ibrede, and a new bridge to Aboh.
