= Western Delta University =

Private university in Delta State, Nigeria

Coordinates: 5.9981°N 5.6888°E

- Motto: Knowledge for Human Advancement
- Type: Private
- Established: 2007
- Vice-Chancellor: Professor Augustine Ovuoronye Ikelegbe
- Location: Unoghovo,Oghara, Delta State, Nigeria
- Website: http://wdu.edu.ng
- Location within Nigeria

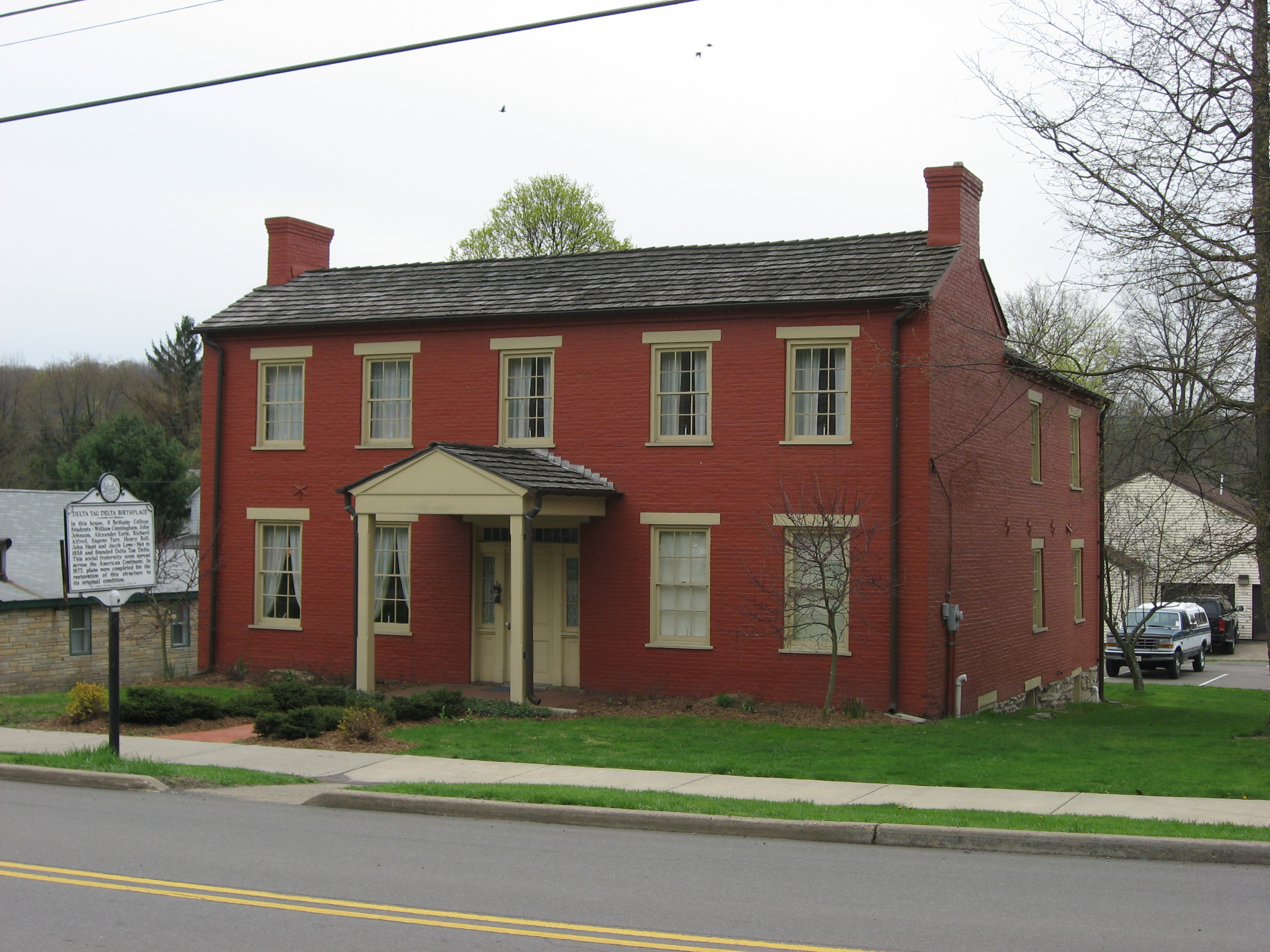
House of Delta Tau

Western Delta University is located in Unoghovo-Oghara, Delta State, Nigeria. It was established in 2007 and is a private university. The National Universities Commission granted a provisional license to Western Delta University.

Western Delta University was founded by a group of Urhobo scholars under the auspices of the Urhobo Advancement Foundation (UAF) who saw the need for a privately financed university in the wetlands of Delta State, Nigeria. Since its establishment in 2007, WDU has offered access to a wide range of academic opportunities.

== Admission ==
Western Delta University admits students via JAMB's UTME and Direct Entry into various courses. Requirements for admission into Western Delta University are GCE O/Level, SSCE, NECO or NABTEB credit level passes in at least five (5) subjects including English Language, Mathematics, and one relevant science or social science subject obtained at not more than two (2) sittings. Direct Entry candidates are expected to possess a good Diploma (with minimum of lower credit), NCE (with minimum of merit) from recognized institutions OR 2 Advanced Level GCE passes in relevant subjects.

== Ranking ==
These are the general ranking of all Universities in the world.

World Universities 12982 out of (14,131)

African Universities 855 out of (1,104)

Nigeria Universities 148 out of (157)

== Administration ==
Prof. Augustine Ovuoronye Ikelegbe, Vice-Chancellor

== Faculties ==
The University operates a collegiate system. It has six colleges. They are:

1. College of Natural & Applied Sciences
2. College of Social & Management Sciences.
3. College of Applied Health Sciences
4. College of Law
5. College of Computing
6. College of Postgraduate Studies

== Departments ==
The following are the courses currently offered by the School:

- Biochemistry,
- Microbiology and Biotechnology,
- Basic And Industrial Chemistry,
- Mathematics & Computer Science,
- Computer Science,
- Software Engineering,
- Cyber Security,
- Information Technology,
- Pure and Industrial Mathematics,
- Physics and Energy Studies,
- Physics & Electronics,
- Geology & Petroleum Studies,
- Accounting,
- Economics,
- Hotel and Tourism Management,
- Business Administration,
- Mass Communication,
- Political Science and Public Administration and
- Sociology,
- Plant Science and Microbiology,
- International Relations.
- Medical Laboratory Science
- Nursing Science
- Law

== Library ==
The library's main objectives are to provide essential resources and services that will enhance the university's principal curricula for education, research, and learning.

== See also ==
Academic libraries in Nigeria
