= Emede =

Kingdom in Isoko South

Emede is a town in Isoko South Local Government Area of Delta State, south of Nigeria.

== Politics and government ==
The town is under the rulership of a monarch, J.O.Egbo, Ewhiri II, Ovie of Emede Kingdom. He is also the traditional custodian of the people's customs, culture and traditions. The monarch is influential in Isokoland in matters relating to his kingdom. He is also a member of the state council of traditional rulers, which also provides him a platform for some influence on statewide issues. The affairs of the town are run by three organs of leadership; the monarch, town Progress Union and the community Youth council.

The kingdom has eight communities, Uruara, Etevie, Adaza, Ewrokpe, Okporo, Odhe, Enuoto and Ahiame. These are administratively controlled by the President General of Emede Progress Union.

== Economy ==
The Emede people of Isoko in Delta state of Nigeria are predominantly farmers and fishermen. The economy is tied to fishing, farming and trading. The major crops are cassava, plantain, yam, guava, corn, groundnut, sweet potato etc.
