= Oghara =

Town in Delta State, Nigeria

Oghara Kingdom
- Kingdom

Language transcription(s)
- Location within Nigeria
- Coordinates: 5°59′N 6°10′E
- Country: Nigeria
- State: Delta State
- LGA: Ethiope West
- Settled: 18th Century
- Clans: Sub divisions: Oghareki & Ogharefe

Government
  - Type: Monarchy
  - Body: Oghara Traditional Council
  - King: HRM Uku Oghara N'ame,Orefe III
  - Chiefs: James Onanefe Ibori and other chiefs from each of the two sub clans.

Oghara Kingdom is a town located in Ethiope West Local Government Area of Delta State, Nigeria.

Oghara kingdom which is regarded by the Urhobos as "The Gateway to Urhoboland" is one of the three kingdoms that make up Ethiope West Local Government Area of Delta State. The others are Idjerhe kingdom and Mosogar kingdom. Oghara kingdom occupies an area of approximately 264.15 square kilometers. Oghara kingdom shares common boundaries to the east with Mosogar Kingdom by the Ethiope River, to the south with Sapele Local Government Area by the adjoining tributary of the Ethiope River, to the north with Edo State by the Osiomo/Ologbo river, and to the south-west with Koko in Warri North Local Government Area. Most of the land in Oghara is flat and swampy, with a dense forest growth.

The main occupations in Oghara are fishing, hunting and farming. The kingdom is an oil-producing area, with operations by Pan Ocean, NPDC, Prudent Energy, and other companies. It also home of various oil and gas tank firms including Cybernetics International Service Limited, etc.

== Origin of Oghara Kingdom ==
In the 18th century, the people of Oghara Agbara-Otor. They passed through a land which is now known as "Oghareki". It is said that the people used a log of wood to cross the Benin River to get to their destination. Gradually, they landed at the other side of a river called Urie-Apele (now known as Sapele). They left Agbara-Otor, which is situated in the present day Ughelli North Local Government Area to find a new settlement elsewhere within the vast lands, as did the first and second set of people who left Agbara-otor, between 1200 A.D and 1240 A.D or thereabout. They decided to make a new home in a place that will be closer to their former home "Igodomigodo". They crossed the Urie-Apele river with an Ughovwe (wooden raft) and arrived safely at Oghareki.

They expressed a word of gratitude to God and said out loud " Oghare, Oh!" which means the Urhobos from Igodomigodo have divided. They name "Oghareki" was accepted to be the name of their new home, which was later translated to "Oghara". After some years, there was a little quarrel amongst them and some of them decided to separate at night. Some of them named: Ogbojere, Ekakabor, Atikpoko, Emeta, Eghoro and his son called Akojevwe landed in a place called Ogharefe. When the others woke up, they couldn't find them and they decided to trace them down to Ogharefe and they later saw them.

They asked if that is where they were able to run to and d others said yes that the oppression was too much. They settled in oghara but later separated to farm in d surroundings. Ogharefe is made up of five quarters ( unoka) namely; Adagboyerin, Edjemounyavwe, Ovade, Ijomi, and Otefe. While Oghareki is made up of two quarters ( unoka) namely; Udurhie and Uduaka. D two subclans(ogharefe and oghareki) have their own oguedions.

== Educational institutions ==
Oghara is home to several known educational institutions in Nigeria. The town is home to the Delta State Polytechnic, Otefe-Oghara; Western Delta University, Unoghovo-Oghara ; Delta State University Teaching Hospital (DELSUTH), Oghara; Model Technical College, Oghareki, Oghareki Model Secondary School, Oghareki; Ogini Grammar school, Uherevie Primary School and Ogharefe Secondary School -Ogharefe.

== Sub-Clans ==
- Ogharefe
- Oghareki

== Festivals ==
The people of Ogharefe, sub clan of the Oghara Kingdom, celebrate the Iyerin Festival annually. The festival is celebrated annually in order to sustain the customs and traditions of the Ogharefe people in Oghara Kingdom.

== Kings of Oghara Kingdom ==
Table showing the reign of the royal families
| Title | Reign Start | Reign End | Family |
|---|---|---|---|
| Orefe I | 1900s | | |
| Oreki I | | | |
| Orefe II | | | |
| Oreki II | | 2011 | Umukoro |
| Orefe III | 2012 | Present | Eshemitan |

== Notable people ==
- Olorogun James Onanefe Ibori

== See also ==
- Oghara-Iyede
