= Uzere =

Oil-producing community in Delta State, Nigeria

- Uzere Kingdom
- Location within Nigeria
- Country: Nigeria
- State: Delta State
- Local Government Area: Isoko South
- Time zone: UTC+1 (WAT)
- Website: uzerecommunity.ng

Uzere (formerly known as Uzei) is a community and traditional kingdom in Isoko South Local Government Area of Delta State, Nigeria. It is an indigenous Isoko community in the Niger Delta region of southern Nigeria. Uzere is known for its petroleum resources, agricultural activities, traditional institutions and cultural heritage. It hosts two major oil fields, Uzere East and Uzere West, and is among the communities associated with the early development of Nigeria's onshore petroleum industry.

== Geography ==
Uzere is located in Isoko South Local Government Area of Delta State, within the Niger Delta region of southern Nigeria. The community lies within a tropical ecological environment characterised by freshwater wetlands, mangrove vegetation, creeks and agricultural land.

The community is surrounded by other settlements in Isoko South and neighbouring parts of Delta State. Its natural environment supports farming, fishing and other traditional economic activities. And is the first community that have a radio station across isoko South and North call World FM 97.3 universe radio.

== History ==
Uzere is historically known as Uzei, according to local historical accounts. Its early history is preserved largely through oral traditions and accounts of ancestral migration and settlement.

One traditional account associates the ancestors of Uzere with migration from the ancient Benin Kingdom. The account identifies Uzei as an ancestral figure whose descendants established the community. Three ancestral lineages, Uheri, Ezede and Uweye, are associated with the traditional organisation of the kingdom.

The traditional history of Uzere forms part of the wider history of the Isoko people. Some details of the community's early migration and settlement remain matters of oral tradition and require further historical documentation.

== Traditional administration ==
Uzere is traditionally governed under a monarchical institution headed by a ruler known as the Ovie. The Ovie is an important custodian of the kingdom's customs, traditions and cultural heritage.

The community also has other leadership structures responsible for communal administration, development, welfare and representation.

The Uzere Community Heritage and Census Portal identifies His Royal Majesty Isaac Udogri, known as Odhebe-Odhiwu I, as the Ovie of Uzere Kingdom. The portal also maintains records of other community leadership positions.

== Settlements and ancestral quarters ==
Uzere is traditionally organised around three principal ancestral quarters:

- Uheri (also written Uhei)
- Ezede
- Uweye

The kingdom is also associated with nine settlements:

- Uhei
- Ezede
- Uweye
- Afikioko (London Base)
- Uhroko (Paris)
- Ekregbesi
- Abale
- Iwre-Ezede
- Iboro

These settlements form part of the traditional and social organisation of the kingdom.

== Economy ==
The traditional economy of Uzere is based largely on agriculture, fishing and trading. Farming and fishing have historically provided important sources of food and income for residents.

Crops cultivated in the area include cassava, yam, plantain, groundnut and other food crops. Groundnut production is also represented in the community's historical photographs and heritage records.

A 2020 study examining indigenous farmers in Uzere, Igbide and Olomoro identified cassava and groundnut among the major crops cultivated in the area. The study also examined the effects of petroleum-related environmental degradation on agricultural livelihoods.

Fishing is another traditional economic activity supported by the community's waterways and wetland environment.

== Petroleum industry ==
Uzere is an oil-producing community in the Niger Delta. Petroleum exploration in the area dates to the 1950s, and commercial oil production was associated with the development of the Uzere oil fields in 1958.

The community hosts two major oil fields:

- Uzere East
- Uzere West

The petroleum industry has played an important role in the economic and social history of the community. Oil production has also generated discussions concerning host-community development, environmental protection, employment and the distribution of petroleum-related benefits.

In December 2011, residents and youths of Uzere protested at the Shell Petroleum Development Company flow station over demands for a Global Memorandum of Understanding with the oil company. The protest developed into a violent confrontation involving security personnel, resulting in reported deaths, injuries and damage to property.

== Environment ==
Uzere is situated within an ecologically important part of the Niger Delta, where mangrove forests, freshwater wetlands and waterways support biodiversity and local livelihoods.

A study published in the Journal of Agriculture and Food Environment in 2022 examined the conservation of the Uzere mangrove forest. The research investigated community participation and proposed a collaborative approach to the conservation of the forest.

Petroleum exploration and production have also raised environmental concerns in the community. Research on farming in the Niger Delta has documented the effects of oil-related environmental degradation on agricultural activities and local livelihoods.

In August 2026, a Federal High Court sitting in Port Harcourt ordered Heritage Energy Operational Services Limited and the National Oil Spill Detection and Response Agency to commence cleanup measures following an oil spill affecting Uzere Kingdom. The case concerned damage associated with Well 14 in Oil Mining Lease 30.

== Culture and heritage ==
Uzere is part of the Isoko cultural area and shares the language, customs and traditional heritage of the Isoko people.

The community maintains cultural records through festivals, historical photographs, traditional performances and oral accounts. Its cultural heritage includes the Eni tradition and the historical significance of its lake.

The Uzere Community Heritage and Census Portal was established to support the preservation of community heritage, citizen participation, leadership information and historical records.

== Education and community development ==
There are numerous public and private schools in Uzere. They include: Uzere Grammar School, St. Paul's Secondary and Primary Schools, Elite Academy, Uzere Primary School, Ogrih Primary School, and Eni Primary School.

Education and social development are important aspects of community life. Schools and other social institutions serve residents of the kingdom.

Community development concerns have included educational infrastructure, healthcare, roads, electricity, youth empowerment and environmental restoration.

Research published in 2025 examined the peacebuilding initiatives of the Niger Delta Development Commission in Uzere. The study investigated the relationship between development projects, community needs, conflict and peacebuilding efforts.

== Government ==
Monarchy: Ovie (king) who doubles as the chief priest of the Eni deity. The current King of the Kingdom is His Royal Majesty Isaac Udogri 1 (The Ovie of Uzere Kingdom).

== Climate ==
Uzere lies within the tropical rainforest belt with luxuriant vegetation. It experiences tropical wet and dry climate, with relatively constant temperatures throughout the course of the years.

== Natural resources ==
Uzere is one of the largest oil producing communities in Nigeria. The Kingdom is also known for the production of groundnut, cassava and fish. There is a saying in Isoko that, "if you love fish, then marry an Uzere man."

== Industries ==
Though Uzere is known for oil exploration, with several oil wells and a flow station for drilling, it has recently developed into an industrial town with a cassava processing factory in Uwhroko community built by the Local Government Authority. It also now has Gas Fired Turbine for Generating electricity in the community which they would soon start distributing to neighbouring communities.

== Tourism ==
Uzere was a known tourist destination in Isoko, until December 4, 1903, when the Eni Lake "Court" was abolished by Colonial District officer Copland Crawford, calling it "trial by ordeal". The famous Eni Lake was a court for the trial of people accused of witchcraft.

In the year the government stopped the ceremonies I and seventeen other women from Idheze were brought to Uzere. There, we had to wait till the appointed day which occurred two lunar months after our arrival. There were many other besides us who came from other places. At the appointed time the Ovie blew his horn and we set for the lake. We all went to the bank of the lake...We then took yams, touched our foreheads with and threw them into the lake as an offering to Eni. The Ovie later arrived and sat on his chair by the waterside. He prayed to Eni asking him to bless the native chalk, drown the women who were witches and save those who were not, then drew the chalk over our chests. We were told to enter the canoe, a canoe fill at that time and rowed out on the lake. When we were a long way from the shore, we were told to jump in, although I cannot swim and would drown in waist high water, yet I eaisily escaped and came safely to land, where I was greatly welcomed... of the seventeen women who came with me from Idheze, ten were drowned.

— an Idheze woman, J.W. Hubbard's book, The Sobo of the Niger Delta

== Festivals ==
Eni festival is the most celebrated festival in the history of Uzere Kingdom. According to Utohware Udumubrai in his book, Uzere People and Culture in the Niger Delta, Eni festival "attracts people from all walks of life especially places where the people usually flock to Uzere to detect witchcraft...It is accompanied with much fanfare, music, cooking and eating of delicious native food. It also includes exchange of gifts". Other festivals are the annual Uzere Students' Reunion and Pageant, and the New Year's Eve Party usually hosted by Arube Dance Band of Uzere at the old market square in Uheri community.

== Health ==
Uzere has a cottage hospital built and equipped by the Shell Petroleum Development Company and health centres.

== See also ==
- Isoko people
- Isoko South
- Delta State
- Niger Delta
- Petroleum industry in Nigeria
