= Federal University of Petroleum Resources, Effurun =

Public university in Effurun, Nigeria

Federal University of Petroleum Resources Effurun
- Motto in English: Excellence and Relevance
- Type: Federal University
- Established: March 2007
- Founder: Federal Government Of Nigeria
- Chancellor: His Royal Majesty, Oba Babatunde Adewale Ajayi, the Akarigbo & Paramount Ruler of Remo Land
- Vice-Chancellor: Professor Ezekiel Oghenenyerhovwo Agbalagba
- Location: Ugbomro, Effurun, Delta, Nigeria; 5°34′09″N 5°45′54″E
- Campus: Rural
- Language: English
- Colors: Blue and White
- Sporting affiliations: NUGA Games
- Website: https://www.fupre.edu.ng/

The Federal University of Petroleum Resources Effurun (FUPRE) in Delta State, Nigeria was established and approved during the Federal Executive Council meeting of 14 March 2007 and admitted its first set of undergraduates in 2008.

The university was established under the Federal Government of Nigeria initiative, to build a specialized university in the Niger Delta to produce middle and higher level manpower and expertise for the oil and gas sector.

The National Universities Commission (NUC) approved sharing of facilities between the Petroleum Training Institute (PTI), Effurun and Federal University of Petroleum Resources Effurun until it moved to its permanent site on development of its main campus at Ugbomro, Uvwie Local Government Area Delta State, in 2010.

FUPRE is the first petroleum university in Africa and sixth in the world.

== Administrative structure ==
The administrative structure of the university consists of:

- Chancellor
- Pro chancellor
- Vice Chancellor
- Principal Officers of the university
- Members of the Governing Council

== Centres and administrative departments/units ==
The centres and administrative departments of the university consist of:

=== Administrative departments/units ===
1. Information and Communication Technology
2. Counselling Centre
3. Academic Planning Unit

=== Centres ===
1. Centre for Maritime and Offshore Studies
2. Centre for Safety Education
3. Centre for Research Innovation

The institution presently have two colleges with eighteen departments. The colleges are:

1. College of Science
2. College of Technology

The College of Science and College of Technology has started running its courses for its academic session.

=== Colleges, Departments and Courses ===
The Federal University Of Petroleum Resources, consists of two colleges which are College of Science and College of Technology. These Colleges are sub divided into 18 departments.

Below are a list of departments in FUPRE

College Of Science

- Computer Science
- Chemistry
- Industrial Chemistry
- Physics
- Geology
- Geophysics
- Mathematics
- Science Laboratory Technology
- Statistics
- Environmental Management and Toxicology

College Of Technology

- Petroleum Engineering
- Marine Engineering
- Electrical/Electronics Engineering
- Chemical Engineering
- Mechanical Engineering
- Petrochemical Engineering
- Natural Gas Engineering
- Civil Engineering
- Computer Engineering

== Programmes ==
The institution presently has three educational programmes:

- College of Basic studies and Foundation Programme
- Centre for Safety Education
- Centre for Maritime and Offshore studies

== Awards and recognition ==
The university has received many recognitions. Some of them include:

- NUGA Games, Best University in the game of Chess, 2011
- Nigerian Society of Engineers (NSE) Best Engineering Department Award, 2015
- SPE Young Member Outstanding Services Award, Africa Regional, August, 2016
- SPE International Young Member Outstanding Services Award, 2017
- 5th Best Petroleum University in the world, 2016
- Most Fuel Efficient Urban Concept Gasoline Vehicle Prize at the 2nd Africa Shell Eco-marathon Competition, 2015
- Most Innovative Design Award Vehicle Prize at the 2nd Africa Shell Eco-marathon Competition, 2015

== Library ==
University Library began on September 6, 2010, with the assumption of duty by a Principal Librarian, Mr. Mathew I. Okoh. The library became operational in October 2011 after the recruitment of staff. At the time the library became open to users, it had the following titles in stock: books- 3000, journals- 85 and an offline database of over 2000 electronic journal articles in Oil and Gas, General sciences, Engineering, ICT and Earth Science. The library serves its constituents Colleges of Science and College of Technology. Also, there is an e-library with functional Internet facilities that provides access to varieties of educational materials. The first University Librarian, Prof. Esharenana E. Adomi, assumed office in May 2015.

College Libraries

- College of Science Library
- College of Technology Library

Library Services

- Loan
- Reference
- e-library
- User education
- Referral
- Bindery
- Reprography
- Current Awareness Services (CAS)
