= Ozoro =

City in Delta State, Nigeria

Coordinates: 5.538333°N 6.216111°E

Ozoro is a city and the headquarter of Isoko North Local Government area of Delta State, Nigeria. It is one of the two administrative units in the Isoko region of Delta State, southern Nigeria. Ozoro had been incorrectly spelt Usoro in some older maps of Nigeria. Ozoro, the capital city of Isoko North, has a population of approximately 186,000 inhabitants.

== Etymology ==
The oral tradition passed on to the present generation, talks of the descent and origin of Ozoro from “Aka or Edo n’ Ubini” as the Great Benin Kingdom is referred to by its people.

== History ==
Ozoro is said to have been founded by Opute who migrated with his wife, Ozoro, in the 7th century from the shores of Igodomigodo or ancient Benin Kingdom to Isokoland in the Niger Delta Region. This was during the reign of Ogiso Orrorro, the 7th Ogiso (King) of Great Benin Kingdom (600–618 AD).

The ancestor and founding father of Ozoro, Opute, was a great warrior. In the company of his wife, he migrated from Ancient Benin. Opute's decision to leave his birth place was forced on him by circumstances. There was trouble at home which made him a persona non grata. Oral tradition has it that Opute and Ogwaran were sons of the same father but from different mothers. Their mothers had a quarrel in the market place that resulted in a fight. Opute's younger brother, Okpe, shot an arrow during the fight which mistakenly blinded Ogwaran's mother. Opute scared of the wrath and anger of his brother Ogwaran, a giant with legendary strength, fled Benin Kingdom with his wife Ozoro, Okpe his younger brother, and his brothers from the same mother, namely; Odume, Osumiri, Ozormo, Etimi, Iselegwu and Obodogwa. Ogwaran's medicine man known as Obogelowo gave a hot pursuit to Opute and his brothers. On getting to Ologbo River, Obogelowo stopped the pursuit and returned to the land of Benin, he could not cross the river for fear of losing his magical powers. Opute is said to have left the shores of Benin armed with a plethora of magical powers for victory in warfare and success in life endeavors. His father gave him a magical staff (“Usu”), the seed of a possession tree, and the replication/artifacts of his own deity.

In Opute's flight from Benin, his magical “Usu” was put to use by him to test for a favorable place of settlement. In every likely place of settlement, he performed the ritual of thrusting the “Usu” into the ground and pulling it out. If he successfully pulled it out, such a place was regarded as not suitable for settlement. After so many suns and moons in his journey of destiny, after crossing so many rivers and streams, subduing both attacking beasts and men, and testing many other places which the “Usu” rejected, he finally arrived upland in the heart of the Niger Delta. Here, he thrusts his “Usu” into the ground at the exact location where Eri-Okpe Community deity is housed today. At this fortuitous spot, he could not pull the Usu off the ground as was the case in previous “unwanted” locations. The powers that followed, led and backed him, had chosen and approved his divine settlement! He planted the possession tree at this place to possess the land and he built a shrine for the ancestral deity on the same spot. His younger brother, Okpe, later became known as Eri-Okpe after the name of its high priest Okpe. As at today, the age-long family that produces the deity's high priest is known and called the Okpe family or “Olua-Okpe”.

Opute gave birth to five sons, who settled in Uruto, Erovie, Etevie, Urude and Uruamudhu, in order, who fanned out and settled in star-fashion from Ala which represents the geographical and administrative center of Ozoro, in a manner very reminiscent of the present ring road in Benin City

== Politics and government ==
As the administrative center for the local government, it houses the council offices. Ozoro is made up of five communities: Uruto, Erovie, Etevie, Urude, Uruamudhu.

The traditional ruler and custodian of the people's customs and traditions is the Ovie. The Ovie is influential in Isokoland in matters relating to Ozoro. He is also a member of the state council of traditional rulers, which also provides him an additional platform for influence on statewide matters.

== Economy ==
Ozoro has vast amount of crude oil and natural gas deposits which are yet to be developed to their full potentials. Shell Petroleum Development Company and the Nigeria National Petroleum Company were the main developers of the oil wells and oil platforms around Ozoro and Isoko. Ozoro and Delta State have vast amount of rubber trees that produce large amount of rubber latex used in various industrial rubber and plastic products manufacturing. Ozoro also has vast amount of deposit of white sands that contains silica used in manufacturing varieties of industrial scale glasses for the automobile industry, homes’ doors and windows glasses, dining plates, drinking glasses, tiles for homes and industries, etc.

Ozoro is home to The Delta State Government University of Science and Technology (formerly The Delta State Polytechnic) with ultra-modern stadium, and has large proportion of academic staff and university professors.

Ozoro also has a large concentration of lawyers, doctors, engineers, accountants and bankers that work in various institutions and branches of various large Nigeria financial institutions such as First Bank of Nigeria, Zenith Bank, etc.

Some of the other main economic activities are large-scale food and cash crop farming, accompanied by game and varieties of wildlife hunting. Ozoro and it’s environs have a wide variety of wildlife and fisheries due to its various rivers, lakes and its proximity to the River Niger and the Atlantic Ocean.

Some of the major staple and cash food crops produced in large scales in Ozoro are cassava, yams, palm oils, mangoes, oranges, plantains, bananas, and guavas.

Ozoro is fast developing with increasing commercial activities, exporting locally produced cash crops to nearby larger cities such as Ughelli, Warri, Sapele, Benin City, Asaba, Port Harcourt, and as far as Lagos and Abuja, the capital city of Nigeria. On market days, which is held every four day interval of the week, Ozoro women and men sell assorted wares in the city's various markets, such as, Cassava (Garri, starch-Ozi, fufu and tapioka- foniya), yams, fresh and dried assorted spices, tomatoes, beans, rice, plantains, fresh and dried smoked cat fishes and other assorted fisheries and bush meats, locally tailored or made African attires clothing’s, etc.

Ozoro the capital city of Isoko North Local Government Area of Delta State, Nigeria, has an estimated population of 186,000 inhabitants. Ozoro is rapidly growing and developing city due to its being the capital city of Isoko North Local Government Area of Delta State and its central geographical location of Delta State and southern Nigeria.

== Climate ==
The tropical climate in Ozoro, Nigeria, is marked by warm temperatures and heavy rainfall, especially from March to October. February has peak highs of up to 39°C (103°F), while January has the lowest temperatures, averaging about 28°C (82°F). With monthly averages of more than 310 mm (12.2 in), the rainy season is more in the month of June and July. The area has plenty of sunshine despite the rainy months, particularly in December when there are roughly 305 hours of sunshine.

== Education ==
Ozoro has several primary, secondary and post-secondary schools. Secondary institutions in Ozoro include Notre Dame College, Saint Joseph College (now St. Joseph College Technical), and Anglican Grammar School (formerly a girls-only school called "Anglican Girls Grammar School"), Alaka Grammar School, Igbonine Grammar School, and a host of private schools; among them are Opute Memorial Grammar School, Final Touch International School, Delsust Demonstration School, Hope Foundation, etc. Post-secondary institutions include the Delta State Polytechnic Ozoro. Catholic Diocese of Warri Music Academy, Film and Broadcast Academy (FABA), N.T.I (DLS)

== Religious beliefs ==
Although the predominant religion in Ozoro is Christianity, many natives still practice African traditional religion, which has been practiced for thousands of years before the arrival of the Europeans to Africa. This is evident in the several ancestral shrines that can still be seen in Ozoro. A critical appraisal of the belief system of the average Ozoro indigene will reveal a combination of both Christian and pagan leanings.
