= Orhuwhorun =

The Orhuwhorun people (sometimes referred to as Ugbede and Obodo people) reside in the northeastern part of Udu Local Government Area of Delta State in Nigeria. Orhuwhorun is a prominent town in the Udu Local Government Area, with Quarters indicating family descent. Richly cultured and powerful, residents identify as 'Urhobo People' and are an important aspect of the state.

== Overview ==
The land is surrounded by neighbouring communities, including Ekete in the north, Owhrode in the south, Egini in the east, and Usieffrun (Urhiephron) in the west. Some communities like Ovwian, Arhagba, and Igbogidi form boundaries in the south-west and the south-east of Orhuwhorun.

According to the 2006 census figures, Udu local government had a population of 142,480 people. Orhuwhorun has grown to be the second most prominent and fast-developing town in the Udu environment, due to the establishment of the Delta Steel Company housing complex built in the 1970s for its workers. With this township Orhuwhorun developed and moved from being a rural area to an urban center.

The Urhobo language predominantly spoken by the people is known as Udu.

== Account of migration ==
Oral interviews and myths from legends and published sources has it that Orhuwhorun founding father named Omiere who migrated from the present-day Uwheru in Ughelli North (LGA of Delta State). During the 15th century there was a war between the Omieres and the Ijaws in which two Ijaw warriors, Egi and Sogun, were killed in retaliation for the death of a man in Omiere's camp. This conflict led to Omiere putting together a group of people who migrated to the present-day Otor-udu.

While travelling, they met Ovo, the rebel leader of the Udu fighters. Ovo planned to wipe out Omiere and his people and forced them to dig a large hole in the ground and work in it. While they were in the pit, he poured buckets of boiling water into the pit with the intention to roast them alive. Omiere escaped with his family and pushed further north again to a new place called Owhrode.

Omiere and his group were not the only migrants that moved out from Uwheru. A man named Owerhiave and his wife Ekperhie left Uwheru around the same time and founded Ekwerhe in Agbarho. Other people moved out from Uwheru at the same time and formed a part of Ibredeni in the Ndokwa (LGA Delta State) as well as Amassama, Kokori and Ibredeni in the Kwale division.

=== Migration from Uwheru to Otor-Udu ===
The Orhuwhorun people are believed to have settled in Otor-Udu before the Udu people. When other Udu groups talk about the Orhuwhorun, they refer to them as “Orhuwhorun-ekpako” which means "the Orhuwhorun people are seniors".

The present-day Owhrode community lives about one mile from where Omiere settled for some years after he escaped from Ovo. Later water scarcity forced the group to move to Ugbede (later called Obodo), which was officially named as Orhuwhorun in 1976. The name Orhuwhorun is a form of Orho-Ughweru (literally meaning, a village from Uwheru).

== Customs ==
“Ogba kwo Orhuwhorun mue en” means "an attempt formed to capture her people can not succeed". This saying was birthed in 1901 after George Eyube died from an accidental shot fired from his own pistol during a patrol from Orokpo to Orhuwhorun.

The Orhuwhorun people have a distinct annual festival that includes, Unueje, "Chechegbe" masquerade, and an annual epha female festival" literally known as  "emeteyavwon" and "jabojawo" at which initiated daughters parade the streets of the town to mark the coming of a new age.

The people also has an autonomous kingdom which was obtained from Aka (Benin) by a man named Okaka from eyenduvwon (now Ekrovie quarters) circa 1715. The king in Orhuwhorun, as in every Urhobo community, is called the Ovie and greeted as "Oghievworo! Oghievworo!! Osieran!!! wo su ton". He is assisted by the council of chiefs and elders (Iletu, Ilorogun, Igbu-irue and Irehren).

== The Orhuwhorun anthem ==
Ukpe tere, ovie ka tota meke tota, Orhuwhorun yo-orhe, oke unueje kelere, Ovie kiriare, echa-bo-ronye ewokpahon, Iletu te’ irheren, ayen-je kiria kele, Igbu-iwrhe ebovo, ilorogun kebewoba, Orere-jobi, avwitiyin roro ma, Ovie avwen kiriare, Ewrho ogodor jobi kpasa,

Oyovwi r’ Okaka oduvie r’ Orhuwhorun.

Orhuwhorun gini yovwi, Ofo-orere avwi-owohor Ovie avwen kiriare

Eh ya eh eh...

Arho oyen etogbe eh not

English translation.

The season is due for the king to speak before others, Orhuwhorun proclaims, festival season is near. The king is seated, together with the nobles. Warriors, votaries, and Chiefs converse with one another declaring, Our king is crowned and seated, His works are due with admiration. Thanks to Okaka who bequeathed us royalty.

Stanza two

The land is blessed and is fit to be called a home, Our king is crowned, his judgments are fair, Join me rejoice (repeatedly
