= Anglican Province of Bendel =

Anglican province in Nigeria

The Bendel Province is one of the fourteen ecclesiastical provinces of the Church of Nigeria. It comprises thirteen dioceses, each one headed by a bishop and it was created in 2002, when the current division into provinces was adopted. His headquarters are located in Asaba. The first Archbishop of the Bendel Province was Albert Agbaje, who died in 2005. He was succeeded by Nicholas Okoh, latter replaced upon his election as Primate of Nigeria by Friday John Imaekhai in 2010. In 2020 Cyril Odutemu became Archbishop of Bendel.

It comprises 13 dioceses:

- Akoko-Edo (14 March 2007; bishop: Ebenezer Saiki)
- Asaba (10 August 1977; bishop: Kingsley Obuh)
- Benin(3 January 1962; bishop: Peter Imasuen)
- Esan (26 October 2000; bishop: Gabriel Elabor)
- Etsako (14 March 2007; bishop: Bishop Felix Unuokhe Olorunfemi
- Ika (14 September 2001; bishop: Godfrey Ifeanyichukwu Ekpenisi)
- Ndokwa (4 June 2008; Bishop: Festus Nwafili)
- Oleh (21 December 1999; bishop: John Usiwoma Aruakpor)
- Sabongidda-Ora (27 May 1993; bishop: Augustine Ohilebo)
- Sapele (12 January 2009; bishop: Blessing Erifeta)
- Ughelli (8 January 1998; Archbishop: Cyril Odutemu)
- Warri (25 January 1980; bishop: Christian Esezi Ide)
- Western Izon (28 August 2005; bishop: Victor Okporu)
