= Peter Imhona Onekpe =

Anglican bishop in Nigeria

Peter Imhona Onekpe (born 15 February 1949) was the Anglican Bishop of Ika in Bendel Province of the Church of Nigeria.

Onekpe was the pioneer bishop when the Diocese of Ika was created in 2001. He retired in 2018, and Godfrey Ifeanyi Ekpenisi was elected as the second Bishop of Ika in September 2018.

Onekpe was born on 15 February 1949 in Etsako West, Edo State. He attended St. Peter's Anglican Secondary Modern School, Jattu-Uzairue, from 1961 to 1963, followed by the Catechist Training School at Akure, graduating in 1967. He graduated from Immanuel College of Theology, Ibadan in 1974, and was ordained in 1975.

Onekpe was the 4th Bishop of Benin, consecrated in 1995, and translated to Esan Diocese in September 2000.
