= David Obiosa =

Nigerian Anglican Bishop and priest

David Obiosa was the first Bishop of Ndokwa Diocese, one of the 13 Dioceses in the Province of Bendel under the Church of Nigeria, Anglican Communion

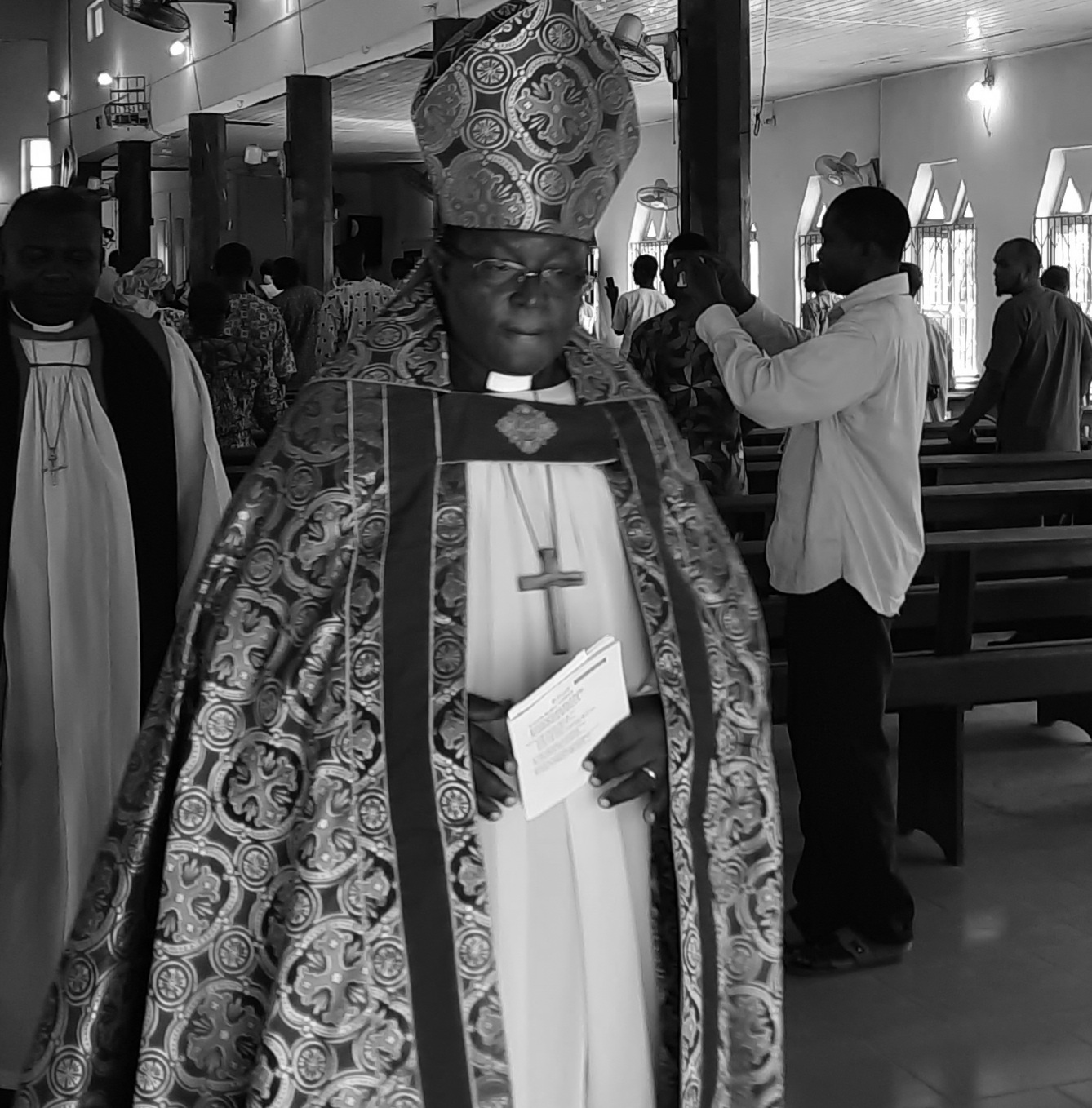

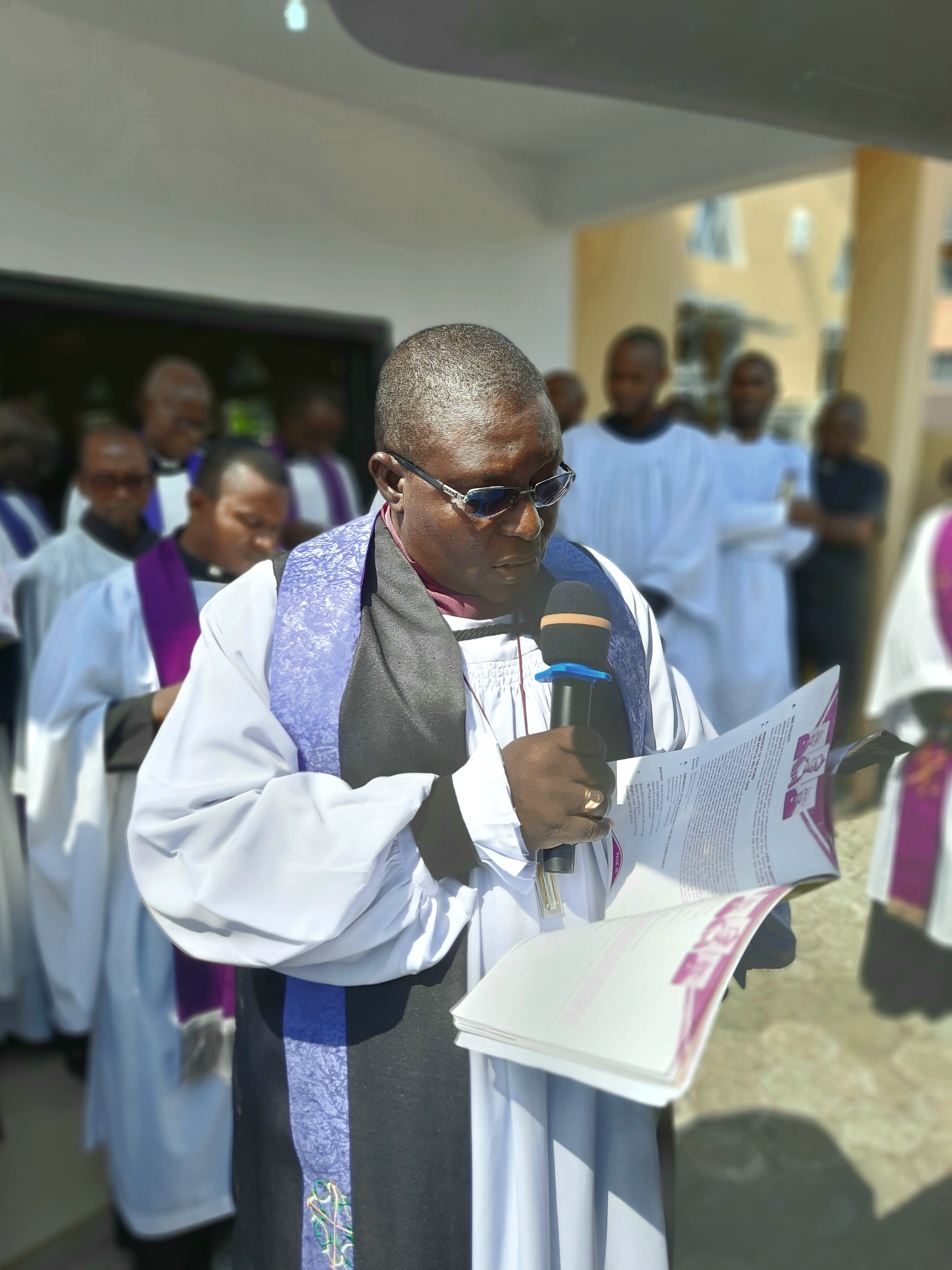

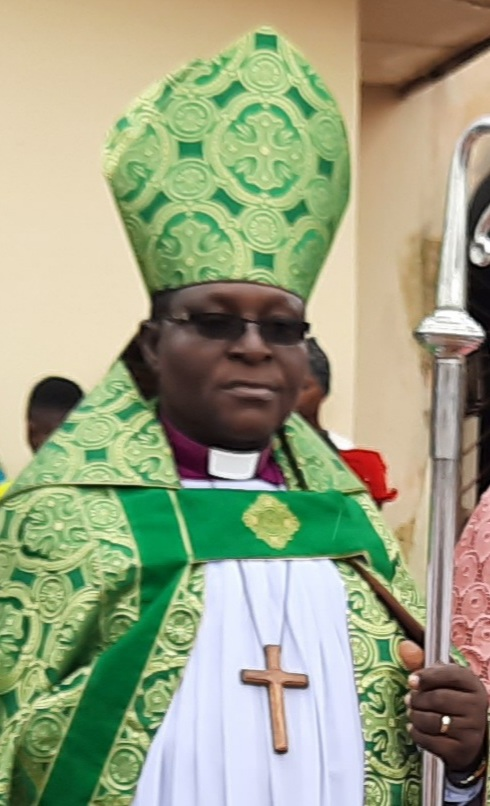

== Early life and education ==
David Obiosa was born on August 23, 1963, to Joseph and Victoria Obiosa (née Umu-Emejulu) in Umuagwuyam Eze-Inyi in Ndokwa East local government area of Delta State, Nigeria. He attended Nnobia Primary School in Inyi, Ndokwa East, Delta State and continued his studies at the Institute of Continuing Education in Kwale and Ebologu Grammar School, Utagba-Uno where he got his West Africa School certificate and General Certificate in Education (GCE) respectively. For his ordination training he schooled at the Trinity Theological College in Umuahia, where he earned his Diploma in Theology. At St. Paul's College, Awka/University of Nigeria, Nsukka, He obtained a diploma in theology and a B.A (Hons). He earned a master's degree in Biblical Studies (Old Testament) at Crowther Graduate Theological Seminary, Abeokuta.

== Ordination & Preferments ==
The Rt. Rev'd. David Obiosa was ordained a deacon on the 14th of July, 1991 by Rt. Rev. R.N.C. Nwosu, Bishop of Asaba. He was priested July 12, 1991, preferred canon in May 2000, and preferred Archdeacon in May 2006 by Most Rev. Nicolas D. Okoh, Archbishop of Bendel Province & Bishop of Asaba.

== Consecration ==
He was elected and consecrated as the Bishop of the Anglican Diocese of Ndokwa in May 2008 by the Most Rev'd Peter Akinola D. D. Then Archbishop, Metropolitan and Primate of all Nigeria. He was Enthroned as the first Bishop of the Anglican Diocese of Ndokwa, June 4, 2008 at the Cathedral Church of Christ Obiaruku.

== Appointments ==
Chaplain, Knights of St Christopher & Mary, Anglican Diocese of Asaba, 1998–2008.

Asaba Diocesan Communicator.

Member, Asaba Diocesan Board of Mission & Evangelism.

Member, Asaba Diocesan Bishop's Examining Committee.

Member, Archbishop's Advisory Committee, Anglican Diocese of Asaba.

== Awards and Conferments ==
On the 25th of November, 2021. The rank of General in the Missionary Army, Navy and Airforce Chaplaincy(MANAC) was conferred on the Rt. Rev'd. General David Obiosa.

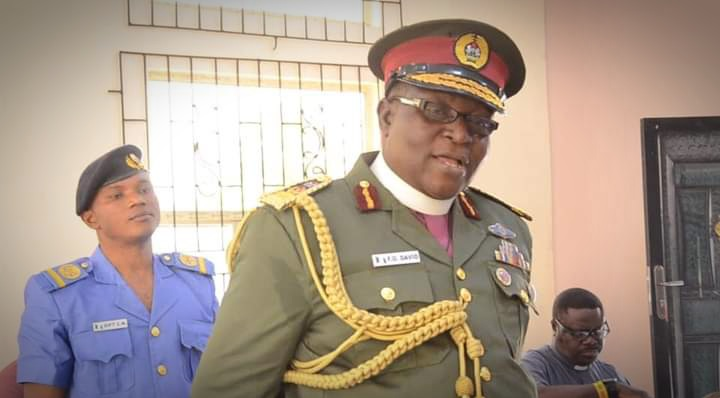
Rt. Rev'd. General David Obiosa

== Personal life ==
David Obiosa was married to Joy Ifunanya Obiosa, with whom he had four children.

== Death ==
David Obiosa died on the 25th of October, 2022 at Delta State University Teaching Hospital, Oghara after a brief illness. He was 59 years old at the time of his death.
