= Udu, Nigeria =

Udu
- LGA
- Interactive map of Udu
- Location within Nigeria
- Coordinates: 5°45′N 5°43′E
- Country: Nigeria
- State: Delta State
- Headquarters: Otor-Udu

Population (2006)
  - Total: 142,480
- Time zone: UTC+1 (WAT)

Udu is a Local Government Area in Delta State, Nigeria with its local government headquarters at Otor-Udu. It had a population of 142,480 people at the 2006 census. It is one of the Urhobo kingdoms and has its own king, or ovie. The town is about 10 minutes drive from Osubi Airport.

== Geography ==
The area has numerous streams that inter-connect into an intricate web of rivers, lagoons, swamps and wetlands. It has tropical weather and a rain forest with evergreen vegetation and plantation all year round.

It is a boundary city/local government and a suburb of Warri metropolis and is connected from Enerhen by the Udu Bridge over Warri River.

== Climate ==
The average yearly temperature is 28.58 °C (83.44 °F) and there are 204.98 days of precipitation, the savanna climate in Ndiagu-Onicha is tropical wet and dry.

== Cultural heritage ==
The villages that makes up of the present Udu local government area are historically grouped into three sub-clans.

=== Evwrirhe Sub-clans ===
These are the villages and towns: Aladja, Ovwian, Emadadja, Egini, Obubu, Ubogo, Oleri, Oto Udu, Ogbe Udu, Ukpiovwin, Ukperheren, Ayama, Ekrota, Ugbisi, Owhrode, Ekete Oboto, Ekete Uburhie, Okolo Uburhie, Okolo Oboto, Ovworhokpokpo, Erhiephiho, Egiegi, Epame, Ujevwu, Oghior, Ohwase.

=== Oniere Sub-clan ===
These are Orho-Uwherun (Orhuwhorun) (Uwherun settlement), Igbogidi, and DSC Township, new town founded due to the construction of Delta Steel Company (DSC) at Aladja, Steel Township.

=== Uheredjo Sub-clans ===
These are Opete, Okpaka and Enerhen.

== Economy ==
Udu's natural resources include rubber and rubber products, palm oil and palm products, cassava, fruits, vegetables and maize available in large quantities. Silica is available in a nearby town for the manufacture of glass and also is crude oil, natural gas and other minerals for the petrochemical industry.

The Delta Steel Company (DSC), an integrated steel manufacturing industry, spans land provided by both Ovwian and Aladja communities. It was one of the largest steel plants in Africa when it was built in 1980. Between 1995 and 2004 it was the main employer and a steel town grew around it, though it is now uninhabited. In 2021 the steel plant was still operating but at a minimal level.

A Shell gas processing facility is situated near Otor-Udu, together with other engineering companies.

A railway line connects Itakpe-Ajaokuta to Warri through Aladja.
