= R.M. Dumuje =

Nigerian Army officer and businessman

Major General R.M. Dumuje
- Born: Udjeghe Dumuje; 24 June 1929; Aladja, Delta State, Nigeria
- Died: 9 May 2008 (aged 78); Lagos, Nigeria
- Education: Dore School, Warri, Nigeria; RAOC School, Blackdown, England; Manchester University, England
- Military career
- Branch: Nigerian Army
- Service years: 1948–1984
- Rank: Major General

Raymond Matthew Dumuje OFR, fss, mni, psc, BEM (24 June 1929 – 9 May 2008) was a Nigerian Army officer and businessman. He became the first Quartermaster general of the Nigerian Army. On 13 February 1976, as a colonel, he was shot and wounded in Ikoyi, Lagos during the failed "Dimka coup" attempt that saw the assassination of the then Military President, General Murtala Ramat Mohammed. The history of the Nigerian Armed Forces records this particular event as a mistaken identity for Lt-General Olusegun Obasanjo, the then Chief of Staff of the Nigerian Army. He was one of very few to have served both in the Nigerian Army and the Nigerian Air Force. He was also a prominent indigene of the Udu clan in Delta state. He retired as the Director General, Nigerian Army, Army Reserve and Recruitment, in January 1984.

== Early years and Education ==
Dumuje was born in Aladja on 24 June 1929 into the Udu clan of the Urhobo tribe. He attended Dore Elementary School. He later obtained the Advanced level of the then General Certificate of Education before joining the Nigerian Army in 1948.

== Life in the Nigerian Army ==
He was enlisted into the Nigerian Army on 22 March 1948 as a Regular Combatant. Afterwards, he received the award of The Queen's Own Nigeria Regiment, Royal West African Frontier Force from Queen Elizabeth II in 1957 and was later commissioned as a lieutenant in September 1960 with Seniority in the rank of second lieutenant with effect from September 1959.

He attended the Ordnance Officers’ Course RAOC School in Blackdown, West Sussex in 1964. He was further promoted to the rank of a lieutenant colonel in 1968 after which he attended Manchester University for a Postgraduate course in Management Sciences between 1970 and 1971.

In 1970, as a lieutenant-colonel in the Nigerian Air Force and a postgraduate student at Manchester University, he was part of the Nigerian delegation to the Soviet Union, led by the then Nigerian Federal Commissioner For Communications, Aminu Kano, where they were met by Premier Alexei Kosygin.

As a colonel, he attended the Senior Officers course at the Army Command and Staff College, Jaji, Kaduna in Nigeria in 1977. Subsequently, he became a Member of the National Institute for Policy and Strategic studies in Kuru in March 1980.

Colonel R.M. Dumuje (1st from left) at the Senior Officer's course, Army Command and Staff College, Jaji, Kaduna, Nigeria. Lieutenant Colonel I.B. Babangida (2nd from left)

== Major military operation ==
As the quartermaster general of the Headquarters Nigerian Army, he commanded the entire operation to put down a religious insurgent movement in Kano led by a Cameroonian called Muhammadu Marwa, better known as "Maitatsine" in 1980. It was reported that he bluntly told the then president Shagari, who served as the second president of Nigeria’s Second Republic between 1979 and 1983, that he could not guarantee the use of minimum force, particularly if any of his men were wounded or killed.

Major General R.M. Dumuje (rtd.) with Alh. Shehu Shagari, former head of state, Federal Republic of Nigeria.

He retired in the rank of major-general on 16 January 1984 after serving in major states in Nigeria.

== Appointments Held ==
- Regimental Quartermaster, 5th Battalion, Nigerian Army between 1960 and 1963.
- Senior Provision Officer, Ordnance Depot, Nigerian Army between 1965 and 1966
- Secondment to the Nigerian Air Force and appointed Staff Officer II Logistics Headquarters Nigerian Air Force in May 1966
- Senior Air Staff Officer, Logistics Headquarters Nigerian Air Force between 1967 and 1970
- Commander, Nigerian Air Force, Logistics Wing, Ikeja, Lagos State, between 1971 and 1974
- Commander, Nigerian Air Force, Defence Wing, Makurdi, Benue State between 1974 and 1975
- Reposted back to the Nigerian Army and Appointed Director of Ordnance services, Nigerian Army Ordnance corps (NAOC) between 1975 and 1980.
- Quartermaster General, Headquarters, Nigerian Army between 1980 and 1981
- Director General, Army Reserve and Recruitment, Headquarters, Nigerian Army between 1981 and 1984

== Honours and awards ==
Awarded the:

- British Empire Medal in 1956
- Nigerian Independence Medal in 1960
- U.N. Operations (Congo) Medal in 1961
- Defence Service Medal
- National Service Medal
- Nigeria Crisis Medal
- Republic Medal
- Forces Service Star
- Order of the officer of the Federal Republic of Nigeria in 1981.
- Member of the National Institute - mni

== Chairman/Directorship of Boards ==
- Member of the Armed Forces Procurement Committee between 1968 and 1970
- National Vice President (Edo/Eastern Zone) of the Cocoa Association of Nigeria
- Chairman of the Board of Directors of Integrated Rubber Products (Nigeria) Plc.
- 2nd Vice President General, Udu Clan, Okpe Local Government Area, Delta State, Nigeria, amongst others.
