= Okwagbe =

Coordinates: 5°25′26″N 5°50′04″E

Okwagbe is a commercial town in the Ughelli South Local Government Area of Delta State, Nigeria. The town is located along the Forçados River, and shares boundaries with the Oginibo, Okuemor, Otegbo, Owahwa, Egbo-Ide, and Okreka (Ofonibaya) communities, among others. Okwagbe is the most populated town in Ughelli South, and is regarded as a center of commerce. The market feature gives rise to the town's name, which means "coming together."

Okwagbe has two government primary schools, one government secondary school, one missionary secondary school, a government health center, private clinics, two major market, one police station, a military outlet/check point, and ten quarters, also known as streets.

The community is sub-divided into two wards: Okwagbe Inland and Okwagbe Water-side.

== Climate ==
As part of the town in Ughelli South, the tropical climate of Okwagbe Nigeria, is marked by heavy rainfall all year round. While the rainy season peaks from May to October, especially in September with 394 mm of precipitation, January and February are pleasant months with highs temperatures of 39 °C (102 °F). In the warmer months, average temperatures hover around 27 °C (81 °F). The area has plenty of sunshine, particularly in December when there are 305 hours of sunshine.
