= Owhrode =

- LGA
- Location within Nigeria
- Coordinates: 5°45′N 5°43′E
- Country: Nigeria
- State: Delta State
- Headquarters: Otor-Udu
- Time zone: UTC+1 (WAT)

Owhrode is a community in the Udu Local Government Area of Delta State, Nigeria.

Owhrode is an Urhobo speaking community, its people speak Udu dialect which is the dialect of the Udu people. It shares borders with Orhuwhorun, Usiefrun, Egini, Edjowphior (Edjophe/Erhiephihor), Ovwhorokpokpor and Otor Udu.

A study centre for National Open University is located there at Ghavwan.

In late 2016 Owhrode and other Udu communities were engaged in a border dispute with Ughievwen communities in Udu and Ughelli South LGAs.

The militant group Niger Delta Greenland Justice Mandate claimed responsibility for an attack on a gas pipeline in the Owhrode area on August 19, 2016.
