= John Onyaene Dafiewhare =

Anglican bishop in Nigeria

John Onyaene Dafiewhare was enthroned as the first Bishop of Warri in Delta State, Nigeria, on 28 January 1980.

The Diocese was inaugurated in 1976, and T. I. Akintayo was chosen as the pioneer bishop, but this met opposition from the diocese and Dafiewhare was consecrated instead by Agori Iwe, the recently retired Bishop of Benin, acting unilaterally. The problem was eventually resolved by the re-consecration of Dafiewhare by the Primate T.O. Olufosoye on 25 January 1980.

Dafiewhare died in 1994.
