= Ekrejegbe =

Ekrejegbe is a village in Ughelli South Local Government Area of Delta State, Nigeria, having boundaries with Ekakpamre. The people are mostly Christian and traditional worshippers. One of the streets in Ekrejegbe village is called Ekrogbe Quarters.

On 17 September 1999, Ekrejegbe was among some Ughievwen communities affected by an oil spill that resulted in a fire.

On 20 April 2018, Ekrejegbe was one of the two Ughievwen communities where the Delta State Governor Ifeanyi Okowa performed a "ground-breaking ceremony for a 400MW combined cycle power plant".

The Urhobo people, including Ekrejegbe people, are said to be organized either by elders based on the age-grade system (gerontocracy) or based on rich and wealthy (plutocracies)".
