= Jonathan Edewor =

Pioneer Bishop of Anglican Diocese of Oleh (1942–2021)

The Rt Reverend Jonathan Edewor
- Bishop Diocese of Oleh
- Church: Church of Nigeria
- Diocese: Diocese of Oleh
- In office: December 1999 - July 2012
- Successor: Rt Rev'd John Aruakpor

Personal details
- Born: July 17, 1942
- Died: February 13, 2021
- Spouse: Dame Elizabeth Edewor

Jonathan Francis Ekokotu Edewor (17 July 1942 - 13 February 2021) was the pioneer Bishop of Anglican Diocese of Oleh. He died on 13 February 2021 after a brief illness.

== Early life and death ==
Jonathan Francis Ekokotu Edewor was born in Erawha-Owhe(present day Isoko North local government area of Delta State) to Late Pa Stephen Ogor and Late Mrs Ruth Emetakiewe Edewor on the 17th of July 1942. He was the pioneer Bishop of Anglican Diocese of Oleh and he served from December 1999 to July 2012 when he retired and was succeeded by John Aruakpor. He died on 13 February 2021 after a brief illness and was buried on 17 April 2021.
