= Imode =

Imode may refer to:

- i-mode, a mobile internet service used in Japan
- Imode, Nigeria, a village in Nigeria

== See also ==
- IMOD (disambiguation)
- Emode (disambiguation)
