= Ekrokpe =

Ekrokpe is a town in Ughelli South Local Government Area of Delta State, Nigeria.
