= Ovwian =

Town in the Udu Clan, Delta State, Nigeria

Coordinates: 5°30′26.77″N 5°47′16.55″E

Ovwian is a town in the Udu local government area, Delta State, Nigeria. Its population is over 200,000. Ovwian shares boundaries with Aladja, Ekete, Owhase, Egini, Orhuwhorun and Ujevwu communities. Ovwian is the biggest town in the Udu Local Government area.

== Government ==
An elected president rules over the town. The current President General is Comr. Joseph Dele Okuku, while the Vice President is Chief Michael Edema and the youth chairman is Mr. Edwin Numa

== Religion ==
Christianity is the most practiced religion.

== Subdivisions ==
Ovwian is divided into urban and rural areas. The rural Ovwian has seven quarters namely Ekrimowhe quarter, Uduvwurhie quarter, Uduvwogba(Ozimi) quarter, Ogwhoro quarter, Ekrata quarter, Ekregworhor quarter and Uduvweyara quarter.

== Geography ==
The Udu River runs through Ovwian before merging into the Warri River.

== Education ==
Ovwian primary school, Etako primary school, Emoghene school, Jesu primary school are public schools located inside the town, while Ovwian secondary school is in the outskirts leading to Ujevwu community. Numerous private schools operate in Ovwian community.

== Economy ==
Most of the people are either steel workers, mariners, fishermen, hunters or farmers, businessmen/women or traders.

The Delta Steel Company (DSC), an integrated steel manufacturing industry, spans land provided by both Ovwian and Aladja communities. It was one of the largest steel plants in Africa when it was built in 1980. Between 1995 and 2004 it was the main employer and a steel town grew around it, though it is now uninhabited. In 2021 the steel plant was still operating but at a minimal level. The Niger Benue Transport Company Limited (NBTC) operates at the outskirts of Ekrimowho quarter.

Ovwian has four major markets: one each located in the middle of town and at Ovwian express junction, and two are located along Udu Bridge and Road respectively.
