= Emode =

Emode may refer to:

- Early Modern English, abbreviated EModE
- Emode, a locality associated with the Komedes as known in Antiquity
- Emode, a computer architecture used by the Burroughs large systems
- Emode.com, a media company

== See also ==
- Imode (disambiguation)
