= Ophorigbala =

Nigerian town in Delta state

Ophorigbala is a town in Ughievwen Clan, Ughelli South LGA of Delta State, Nigeria. Located on the right bank of River Forcados. Ophorigbala shares boundaries with Otutuama, Esaba, Ighwreogun communities and Gbekebo Community on the over-side of the Forcados river.

== Government ==
An elected President General rule over the town, the President General is assisted by Vice Chairmen, Spokesmen, Secretaries, Treasurers, and others elected in a community conference.

== Subdivisions ==
Ophorigbala is divided into has three quarters, namely: Erhurun quarter, Ughere quarter and Adjekota quarter.

== Geography ==
The community is situated in the rain forest occurring in flat-floored valleys and adjoining low-lying areas to the Forcados River, which runs through Ophorigbala before merging into the Warri River.

== Religion ==
Christianity is the most practiced religion.

== Education ==
It has a government primary school Taku Primary School and Ophorigbala Mixed Secondary School a government secondary school which student from other communities also attend. Numerous private schools operate there.

== Economy ==
Most of the people are either artisans, fishermen, farmers, businessmen/women or traders.

The community is famous for the production of mat, fish, cassava, rubber and the distilling of gin.

Ophorigbala was known to be a commercial hub where farmers, trades and artisans bring their wares from neighboring villages (both land and riverine) to sell and purchase items they need take back home, Its Market is located by the bank of the river and facilitate the easy movement of goods in and out of through it water ways but, economy activities have come to a hurt as a result of the bad state of the access road to the community, which have been abandoned the government.
