= Albert Aduloju Agbaje =

Nigerian Anglican bishop (1937–2005)

Albert Aduloju Agbaje (12 June 1937 – 31 January 2005) was the first Anglican Bishop of Sabongidda-Ora in Bendel Province of the Church of Nigeria.

Agbaje was born on June 12, 1937, in Ikare. He went to Victory College, Ikare, and graduated from Immanuel College of Theology, Kudeti-Ibadan in 1963.

He subsequently graduated from the University of Nigeria, Nsukka and the University of Ife where he obtained a master's degree and a doctorate.

He held several posts in the Ministry of Education, rising to Provost of the Lagos State of Education, Ijanikin, Lagos in 1982. From 1984, he began full time church ministry and was elected as the first Bishop of Sabongidda-Ora in 1993. In 2003 the Church of Nigeria was restructured, and Agbaje became the first archbishop of the new Ecclesiastical Province of Bendel, a position he held until his death on 31 January 2005.
