= Otokutu =

- Ughelli South
- Location of Delta State in Nigeria
- Coordinates: 9°45′N 8°43′E
- Country: Nigeria
- Location: Delta State
- access: steel complex road through Ebrumede roundabout Effurun Delta State
- Time zone: UTC+1 (WAT)
- Area code: 333

Otokutu is a town in the Ughelli South Local Government Area of Delta State, Nigeria. It is accessible through the steel complex accessway Delta State.

== See also ==
- Asaba, Delta
- Ughelli South
