= IMOD =

IMOD can mean:

- Interferometric modulator display - a Qualcomm display technology.
- iPod - Apple iPod Modification
- Kaavo imod - Cloud Computing Management Application by Kaavo
- IMOD (software) - a set of programs used to visualize, reconstruct and segment microscopy images.
- Ministry of Defense (Israel) - Israeli Ministry of Defense.

== See also ==
- Imode (disambiguation)
