= Egbo-Uhurie =

Village in Delta State, Nigeria

Egbo-Uhurie is a village in Ughelli South Local Government Area of Delta State, Nigeria.

== School in Egbo-Uhurie ==
Egbo Primary School

== Health center in Egbo-Uhurie ==
Primary Health Centre Ekakpamre

== Climate ==
In the district, the dry season is hot and partially cloudy, the wet season is warm and cloudy. The average annual temperature fluctuates between 69°F and 89°F; it is rarely lower or higher than 61°F or 93°F.The best time to visit for weather events is towards the Ending of November and January months.
