= Imode, Nigeria =

Village in Nigeria

Imode village, commonly referred to as Imode, is a community in Ughelli South Local Government Area of Delta State, Nigeria. It falls under Jeremi political Ward 3. It is located after Eyara community. The community is made up of several quarters
