= Festus Nwafili =

Anglican Bishop of Ndokwa Diocese

The Rt Reverend Festus Nwafili
- Bishop Diocese of Ndokwa
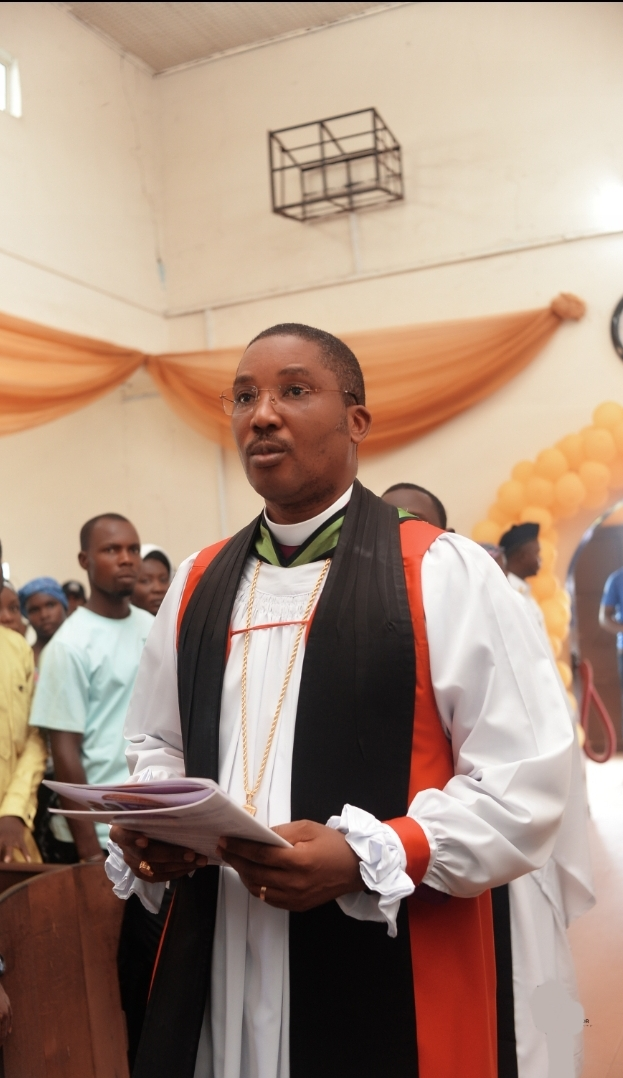
- Procession of the Rt. Revd Nwafili in to the Cathedral Church of Christ Obiaruku for his enthronement.
- Church: Church of Nigeria
- Diocese: Diocese of Ndokwa
- In office: September 2023 – present
- Predecessor: David Obiosa

Orders
- Consecration: August 2023 by Henry Ndukuba

Personal details
- Born: 19 April 1976 (age 50) Ndokwa East
- Spouse: Evelyn Nwamaka Uzorka-Nwafili

Festus Uzorka Nwafili (born 19 April 1976), at Ndokwa East, is the Bishop of Ndokwa Diocese in the Anglican Communion. He was consecrated Bishop of Ndokwa in 2023.

== Background and early life ==
Festus Uzorka Nwafili was born in Obeche-Inyi in Ndokwa East local government area of Delta State. He got his First school leaving certificate in 1987 and his Senior Secondary Certificate in 1996. In 2001, he got his Bachelor of Arts Degree and Diploma in Theology from St. Paul's University College, Awka, and Master's in Art from Nnamdi Azikiwe University, Awka in 2010.
