= Edafe Emamezi =

Anglican bishop in Nigeria

Edafe Emamezi is a retired Anglican bishop in Nigeria.

Before his retirement in 2021 he served as Bishop of Western Izon. He was born on 3 January 1951 at Nwaniba and educated at Archbishop Vining College of Theology. He was ordained in 1986. He has served in the United States, Oleh and Warri, where he served as Archdeacon.

He was consecrated as the pioneer Bishop of Western Izon in 2005.
