= Efe Ronald Chesterfield =

Nigerian author and writer

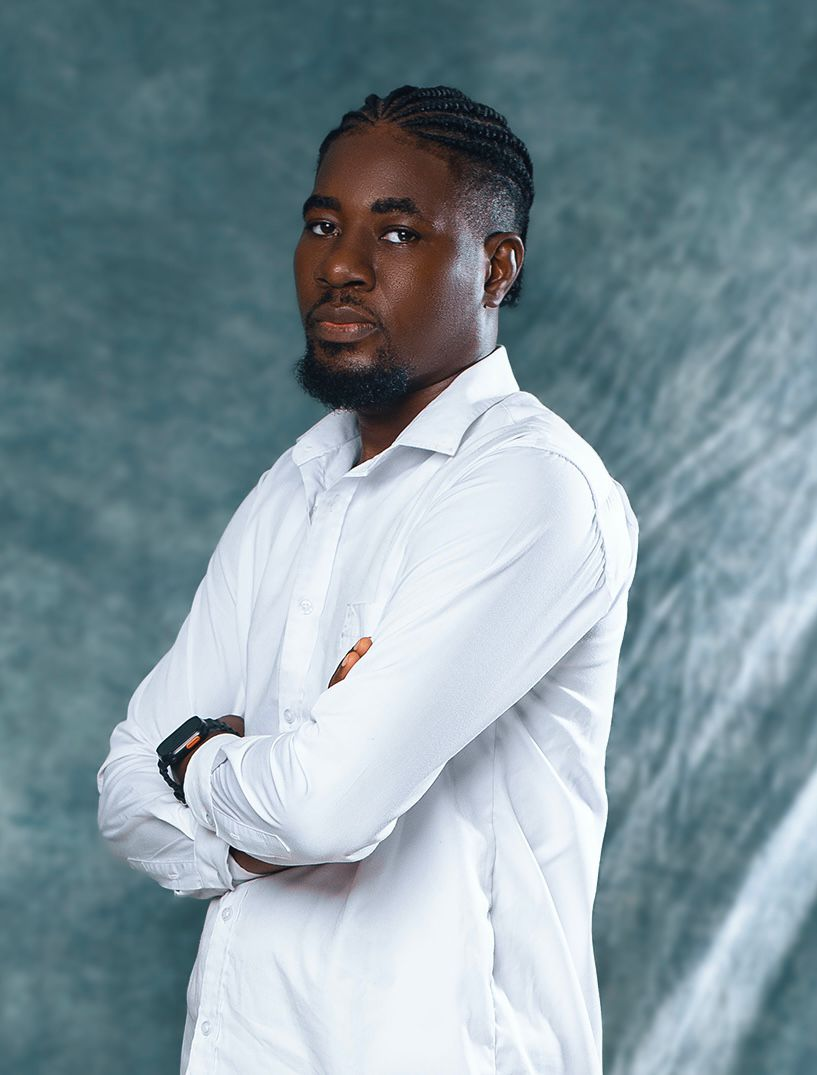
- Born: Efe Ronald Chesterfield
- Writing career
- Notable work: Comedy of Disgrace

Efe Ronald Chesterfield is a Nigerian writer, on air personality (OAP), activist , playwright, poet, and essayist.

He is an awardee of Nigerian Books of Record, Yessiey Awards and was listed among the Yessiey Africa 100 Most Influential People in 2023.

== Early life ==
Efe Ronald Chesterfield was born and raised in Oyo state. He had his early education at Sacred Heart Private School and Government College in Ibadan, Nigeria.

== Career ==
Efe Ronald Chesterfield is a radio anchor and reporter at Space FM. He is the founder of Sublime Foundation for Africa (an NGO), and The Chesterfield Academy (TCA). Through his foundations he has trained over 15,000 children in public speaking.

Efe was the Creative Director for Omidan, Styles Defunct, a documentary by AyaworanHO3D which was nominated for 2018 Africa Magic Viewers' Choice Awards and also he popularized the term swaggersome.

Efe is the author of many books including the book titled ‘Comedy of Disgrace,’ published in 2014. He was honored with an award by Delta State government and listed among the top 5 dramatists in the state.

In 2024, He was a top 10 finalist in the 6th Beeta Playwright Competition with his piece themed ‘Of Love and War’.

== Publication ==
- Comedy of Disgrace: Maidens of Iwu Trafford Publishing; (May 23, 2014) . ISBN 978-1490725949.

Essays

Memento Mori: A reflection on the transience of human existence

The Labyrinth of Being: Navigating Life’s Existential Questions

== Awards and recognition ==
In 2021, Efe received Nigerian Books of Record awards, Yessiey Awards and was listed among the Yessiey Africa 100 Most Influential People in 2023. He was also honored with an award by Delta State government and listed among the top 5 dramatists in the state.

== Personal life ==
Efe Ronald Chesterfield is married to Blessing Chesterfield.
