= Justus Mogekwu =

Anglican bishop in Nigeria

Justus Nnaemeka Mogekwu is an Anglican bishop in Nigeria.

Mogekwu was ordained in 1990. In 2009 he became Bishop of Asaba.
