= Christian Esezi Ide =

Anglican bishop in Nigeria

The Right Reverend Christian Esezi Ide
- Bishop of Warri
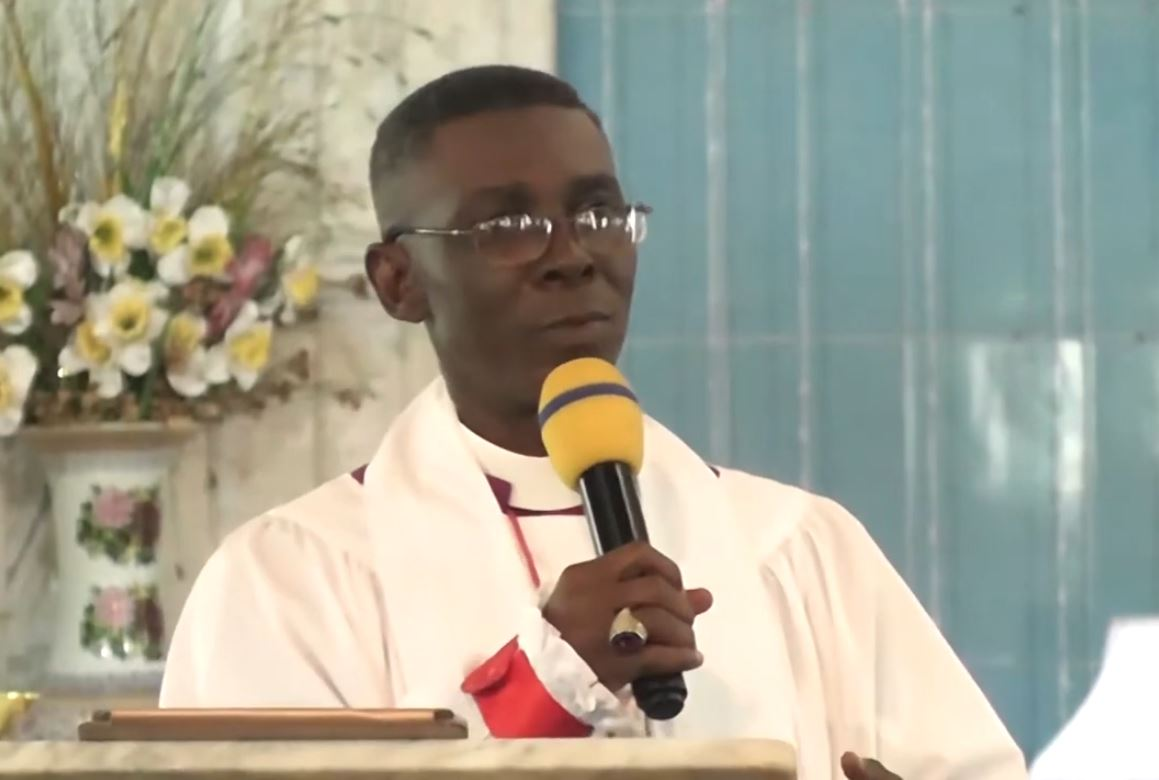
- Church: Church of Nigeria
- Province: Bendel
- Diocese: Warri
- In office: 2006–present
- Predecessor: Nathaniel Enuku

Orders
- Ordination: 1997
- Consecration: 2006

Personal details
- Born: 21 September 1959 (age 66) Benin City, Nigeria

Christian Esezi Ide is an Anglican bishop in Nigeria.

Ide is the current Bishop of Warri. Ide was born on September 21, 1959 in Benin City and educated at Immanuel College of Theology, Ibadan. He was ordained in July 1997. He has served at Igbudu, Emevorand and Abuja.

He was elected Bishop of Warri during the Episcopal Synod on 28 June 2006, at All Saints Church, Wuse, Abuja.

He is also the Chairman of the Governing Council of Adam Igbudu Christian Institute in Emevor, Delta State.

== See also ==
- Anglican Adam Preaching Society
- Cornelius Adam Igbudu
