= Mandy Brown-Ojugbana =

Nigerian musician and radio presenter

Mandy Brown Ojugbana
- Occupation: Musician

Mandy Brown-Ojugbana is a British-Nigerian singer/songwriter, journalist, and radio/television presenter, best known for her version of Bobby Benson's "Taxi Driver" which became a massive hit in 1986. Following her departure from the music industry, she established herself as a media personality, serving as a presenter on both Brilla FM and Smooth 98.1.

== Music career ==
Born to an English mother and a Nigerian father from Asaba, Delta State, and raised in Lagos, Ojugbana began her music career as a choir member and backing vocalist before being discovered in her teens by a gospel record label manager, who offered her a recording contract. After Faze 2 Records acquired the label, Ojugbana made the transition from gospel to secular music. She was assigned a reworked version of highlife musician Bobby Benson’s “Taxi Driver” while she wrote other songs for her debut album Breakthrough, which she promoted with several performances including a notable Easter concert at Eko Hotels and Suites. "Taxi Driver" became a huge hit in Nigeria, and Breakthrough also included a reggae version of George Benson's "Greatest Love of All".

Ojugbana released a second album, All My Love, in 1988, which gained less success. She later returned to her gospel roots, contributing backing vocals to Lorine Okotie's 1990 album Love Medicine. Of her short-lived music career, Brown-Ojugbana has stated "My intention is to grow my broadcasting career. Music is now something that if it happens, it happens."

== Media career ==
In the early 1990s, Ojugbana moved to the United Kingdom where she pursued studies in broadcasting. After a stint with Channel 4, she returned to Nigeria and became a morning show presenter on Brila FM. She later joined Smooth 98.1 FM, where she hosted the show Smooth Breakfast with Mandy.
