= Eyara =

Eyara is a village in Ughelli South Local Government Area of Delta State, Nigeria. In 1963, Nigeria's Federal Census Office reported Eyara's population to be 1,137.
