= Oginibo =

Town in Delta State, Nigeria

Oginibo is a town in Ughelli South Local Government Area of Delta State, Nigeria. In 1922, a Baptist church was established in the community, which became significant to Urhobo Christians.
