= Otu-Jeremi =

Town in Nigeria

Otu-Jeremi is a town in Ughelli South LGA of Delta State, Nigeria. The Nigeria Gas Plant is located here. It is the headquarters of Ughelli South LGA.
