= Anglican Diocese of Oleh =

Anglican diocese in Nigeria

Coordinates: 5°31′N 6°20′E

Diocese of Oleh
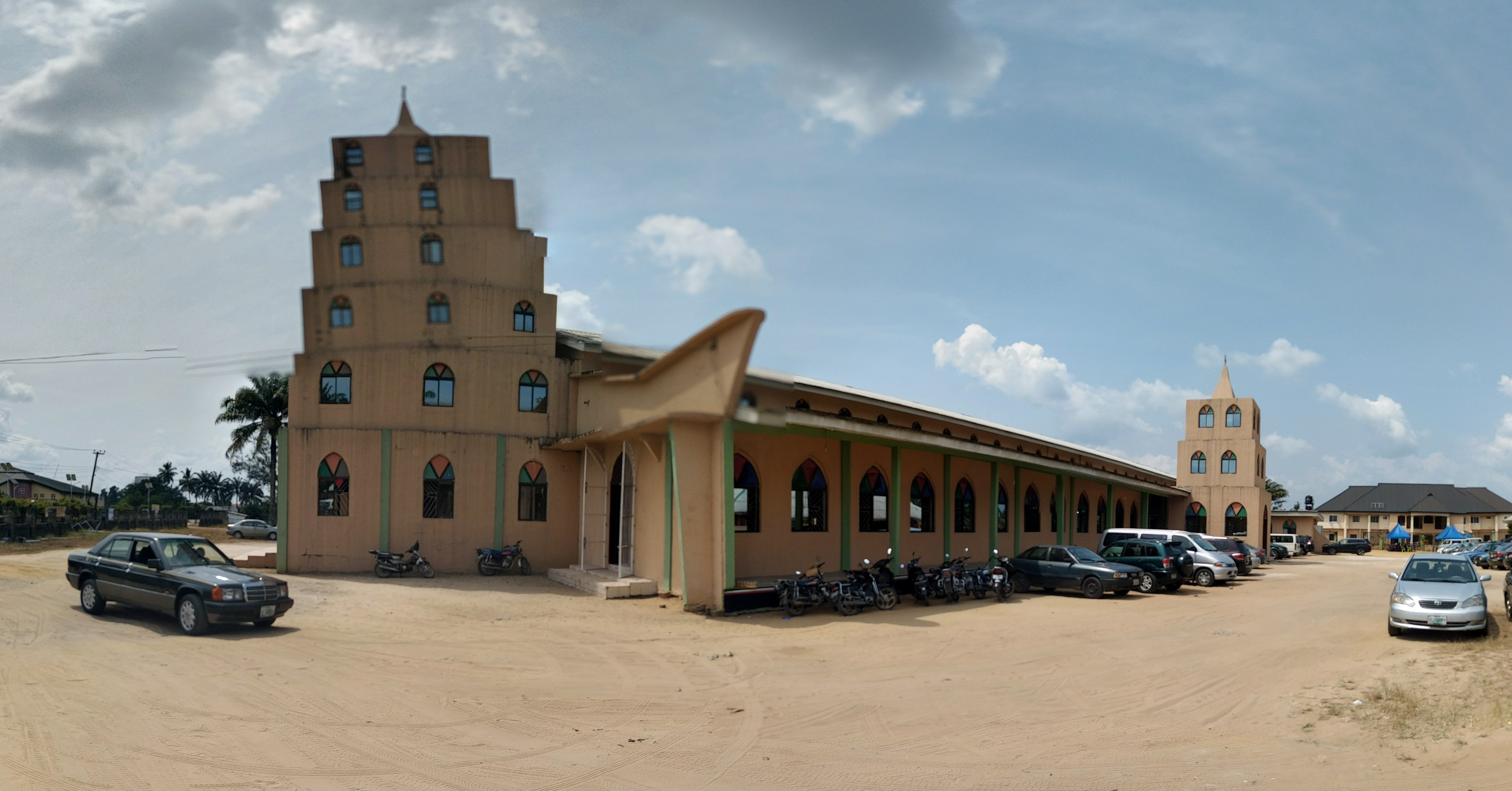

Location
- Country: Nigeria
- Territory: Isoko South and Isoko North in Delta State
- Ecclesiastical province: Ecclesiastic Province of Bendel
- Archdeaconries: 27
- Headquarters: Oleh

Information
- Denomination: Anglican
- Rite: Anglican
- Established: 2001
- Cathedral: Cathedral of St Paul, Oleh
- Language: Isoko; English

Current leadership
- Bishop: Rt Rev'd John Usiwoma Aruakpor
- Dean: Ven. S.A.T Edogbeji

The Anglican Diocese of Oleh is one of 12 dioceses within the Anglican Province of Bendel, itself one of 14 ecclesiastical provinces within the Church of Nigeria. The current bishop is the Right Rev. John Usiwoma Aruakpor.
