= Ekakpamre =

Ekakpamre is a village in Ughelli South Local Government Area of Delta State, Nigeria.
