= Urhiephron =

Urhiephron is a town in Ughelli South Local Government Area of Delta State, Nigeria.
