= Mabel Evwierhoma =

Nigerian academic (born 1965)

Professor Mabel Evwierhoma FNAL, FSONTA
- Born: Mabel Itohanosa Erioyunvwen Evwierhoma; 7 May 1965 (age 61); Benin City, Edo State, Nigeria

Academic background
- Education: University of Ibadan

Academic work
- Discipline: Theatre arts
- Sub-discipline: Dramatic theory Dramatic criticism Gender studies Cultural studies
- Institutions: University of Abuja

Mabel Itohanosa Erioyunvwen Evwierhoma (born 7 May 1965) is a Nigerian Professor of Theatre Arts at the University of Abuja. She specializes in dramatic theory, criticism, gender studies and cultural studies. She was former Dean of the Faculty of Arts, University of Abuja (2014 to 2016), former director, Centre for Gender Security Studies and Youth Advancement, University of Abuja (2021 to 2023) and Member Governing Council, University of Abuja (2009 to 2013).

== Early life and education ==
Mabel Evwierhoma was born to Peter Omoviroro Tobrise and Theodora Tobrise, née Aiwerioghene on 7 May 1965 in Benin City, Oredo LGA of Edo State. She hails from Ukpiovwin village in Udu LGA of Delta State. She attended Abadina Primary School from 1970 to 1975, and the Federal Government Girls College, Bauchi from 1976 to 1981. She gained her Higher School Certificate in 1983 from Federal School of Arts and Science, Suleja. She proceeded to the University of Ibadan, Oyo State, gaining a BA degree in Theatre Arts in 1986 and an MA in 1988. She earned her PhD in Theatre Arts from the University of Ibadan in 1996. She attended Galilee College, Israel, in 2007. She decided to acquire a degree in a different field aside Theatre Arts. She received an LL. B in Law in 2016 from the Igbinedion University, Okada Edo State (after part-time study). She went on to the Nigerian Law School, Abuja, and earned a BL in Law in 2018. She acquired the LL. M in Law in 2021 from the Nasarawa State University at Keffi.

== Career ==
From 1989 to 1990, Evwierhoma was a tutorial assistant at the University of Ibadan, before joining the University of Abuja in 1990 as an assistant lecturer. She was promoted full Professor in 2005.

She served as Coordinator Remedial and General Studies Unit, University of Abuja (1992 to 1994); Head, Theatre Arts Department, University of Abuja (1998 to 2000); Deputy Director, Consultancy Services Unit (2000 to 2003); Deputy Director, Centre for Gender Security Studies and Advancement (2005 to 2006). She was Director, Development Office, University of Abuja, from 2007 to 2011; Member Governing Council, University of Abuja, from 2009 to 2013; Dean, Faculty of Arts, University Of Abuja, from 2014 to 2016; Director, Diaspora Centre, from 2018 to 2020; and, Director, Centre For Gender Security Studies & Youth Advancement, University of Abuja, from 2021 to 2023.

A festschrift for Evwierhoma was published in 2015. It was entitled Gender Discourse in African Theatre, Literature and Visual Arts: A Festschrift in Honour of Professor Mabel Evwierhoma, edited by Tracie Chima Utoh – Ezeajugh and Barclays Foubiri Ayakoroma. In 2020, another Festschrift was also published, entitled A Graceful Woman of Great Discerning: A Festschrift in Honour of Professor Mabel Evwierhoma @50, and edited by Gboyega Kolawole and Sule Egya,

Evwierhoma delivered the 18th Inaugural Lecture of the University of Abuja, at the Main Auditorium, Faculty of Management, University of Abuja, entitled "Mother is Gold: The Mater, the Matter and Women-Centred Approaches in Nigerian Drama and Theatre", on 21 January 2016. In 2019, she was one of three candidates shortlisted for the position of vice chancellor of the University of Abuja.

In June 2020, Evwierhoma delivered a lecture entitled "Rape as Anti-culture in Contemporary Nigeria", calling for cultural resistance and constitutional provisions against rape.

In 2023, she wrote the play The Cut Across. It showcases her experience in dramatic theory, criticism, gender, and cultural studies, and reflected her sensitivity towards gender issues. In this play, the protagonist, Emu, a survivor of female genital mutilation, is determined to challenge the harmful traditional practice in her community after being exposed to Western culture. Supported by her childhood friends, she embarks on a social crusade against a deep-rooted tradition that has existed for generations. The Cut Across portrays the struggles of Urhobo women in Delta State and other regions as they strive to replace harmful customs with more empowering alternatives that allow girls and women to live freely and without harm.

== Membership and fellowship ==
Evwierhoma is a member of the Nigerian Institute of Public Relations (NIPR); Nigerian Bar Association (NBA); Member, Nigerian Oral Literature Association; Nigeria Academy of Letters; African Theatre Association; American Studies Association of Nigeria (ASAN) 2004; African Literature Association, USA (2004 to 2010); Council for the Development of Social Science Research in Africa (CODESRIA) (2016 to 2017); Women in Nigeria (WIN) (1993 to 1996); Society of Nigerian Theatre Artists (SONTA); and, Association of Nigerian Authors (ANA). She is a Fellow, Association of Nigerian Authors (FANA) 2021; Fellow, Nigerian Academy of Letters (FNAL) 2020; Fellow, Centre for African American Research Studies (FCAARS) 2015; and, Fellow, Society of Nigerian Theatre Artists (FSONTA), 2014. She got an Honorary Fellowship from the Association of Dance Scholars of Nigeria (ADSPON) in June, 2024.

== Editorship of academic journals ==
She was editor of the Nigerian Theatre Journal (2 volumes) of Society of Nigerian Theatre Artists (SONTA) (1999 to 2001).

== Honours ==
The Society of Nigerian Theatre Artists (SONTA) gave her the Life Time Service Award in 2009, and the Outstanding Service Award on 11 April 2021.

== Publications ==
- Evwierhoma, M. (2002). “Female empowerment and dramatic creativity in Nigeria” (Ibadan, Nigeria : Caltop Publications (Nigeria) Limited).
- Evwierhoma, M. (2001).Out of hiding: poems. Ibadan: Sam Bookman Publishers, 2001.
- Evwierhoma, M. (2007). “Nigeria, a flourishing culture in diversity”, being a paper presented at the World Culture Day celebrations for the National Institute for Cultural Orientation, (NICO) Abuja.
- Evwierhoma, M. (2002). "Female empowerment and dramatic creativity in Nigeria". Ibadan, Nigeria: Caltop Publications.
- Evwierhoma, M. (2006) (ed., with Gbemisola Adeoti), After the Nobel Prize: reflections on African literature, governance, and development. Lagos, Nigeria: Association of Nigerian Authors
- Evwierhoma, M. (2014). "Nigerian feminist theatre: essays on female axes in contemporary Nigerian drama".
- Evwierhoma, M. (2015) (ed. with Methuselah Jeremiah) Snapshots of the female ethos : essays on women in drama and culture of Africa. Lagos, Nigeria: Concept Publications Limited, 2015.
- Evwierhoma, M. (2021). "Homage to Ukala", Vanguard, 8 November.
- Evwierhoma, M. (2022). "Hagher and Women': A Gendered Excursion into Aishatu and Antipeople", Humanities Review Journal, Vol. 2, No. 1.
- Evwierhoma, M. (2001). "The Wounded Woman: A Feminist Analysis of Olu Obafemi's Collected Plays"
