= Kingsley Obuh =

Anglican Bishop of Asaba diocese

The Rt Reverend Kingsley Obuh
- Bishop Diocese of Asaba
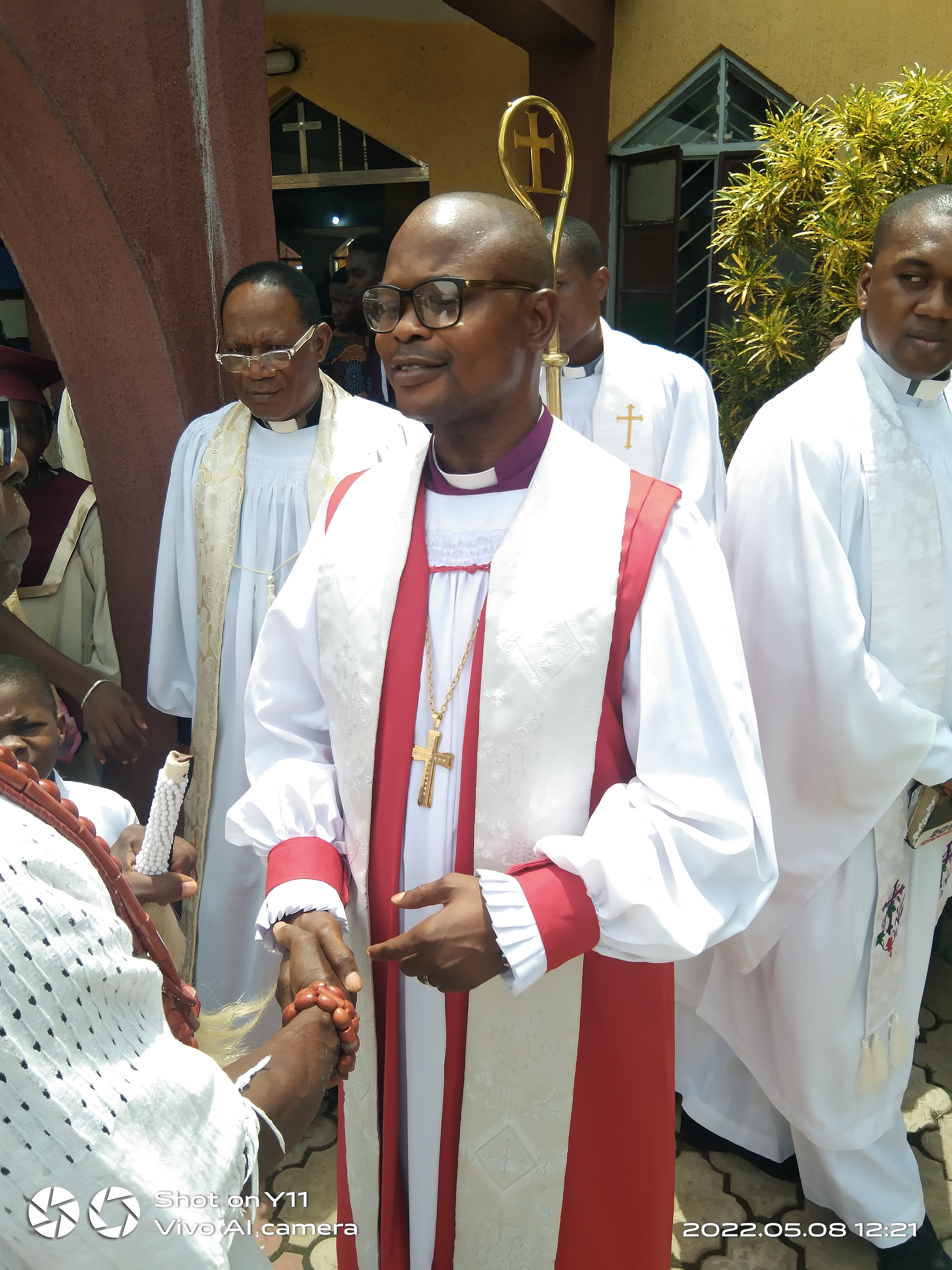
- Rt Rev'd Kingsley Obuh
- Church: Church of Nigeria
- Diocese: Diocese of Asaba
- In office: April 2022 – present
- Predecessor: Justus Mogekwu

Orders
- Consecration: April 2022 by Henry Ndukuba

Personal details
- Born: 22 March 1976 (age 50) Ubulu-Uku
- Spouse: Comfort Obuh

Kingsley Chukwukamadu Obuh (born 22 March 1976), at Ubulu-Uku, is the Bishop of Asaba Diocese in the Anglican Communion. He was consecrated Bishop of Asaba in 2022. He has been married to Comfort Obuh.

== Background and early life ==
Kingsley Obuh is a native of Ubulu-Uku in Aniocha South local government area of Delta State where he was born on 22 March 1976. He attended Uganda Christian University in 2009 where he bagged a degree in Divinity Theology, and also obtained a master's degree in Christian Theology from Ambrose Alli University in 2012. Until his election as Bishop, He was the Administrative Secretary and Personal Assistant to the Primate of Church of Nigeria.

== 4th substantive Bishop of Asaba Diocese ==
On 25 February 2022, he was elected Bishop of Asaba Diocese alongside others at the Episcopal synod of the Church of Nigeria held at St Andrew's Anglican Church, Port Harcourt, Rivers State. On 5 April 2022, he was enthroned Bishop of Asaba Diocese by Henry Ndukuba and assumed office, taking over from Justus Mogekwu.
