= Jeremiah Omoto Fufeyin =

Nigerian minister and Prophet

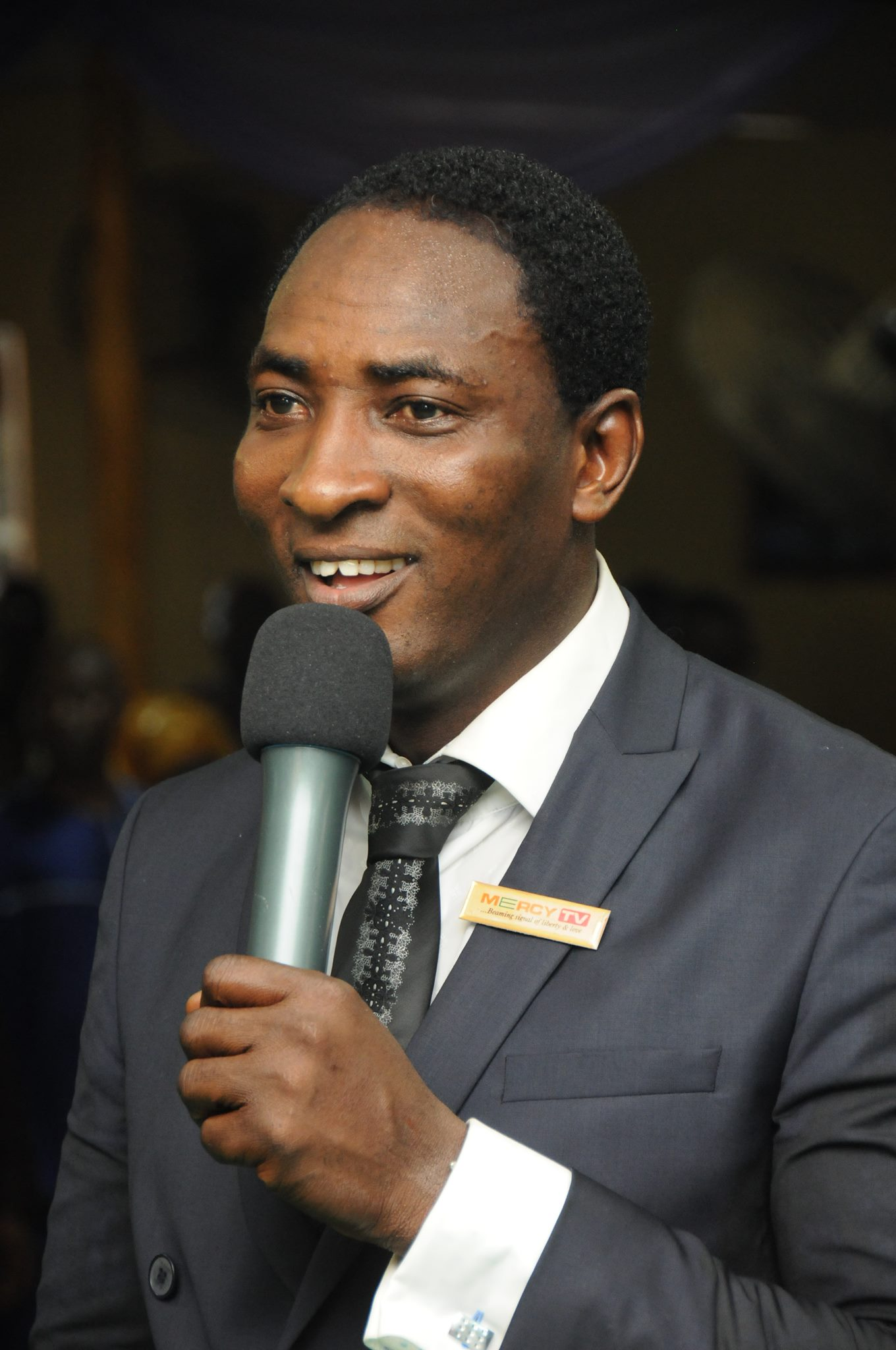
- Born: 15 February 1971 (age 55); Burutu, Delta State, Nigeria
- Occupations: Televangelist minister, philanthropist
- Years active: 2010–present
- Organization: Christ MercyLand Deliverance Ministry (CMDM)
- Spouse: Anthonia Fufeyin
- Children: 5
- Website: www.christmercyland.org

Jeremiah Omoto Fufeyin (born 15 February 1971, Burutu, Delta State, Nigeria) is the founder and head prophet of Christ Mercyland Deliverance Ministry (CMDM), Effurun, Delta State, Nigeria. He founded the church on 3 April 2010.

== Early life and family ==
Jeremiah Omoto Fufeyin was born in Burutu, Delta State, Nigeria on 15 February 1971. He had his primary school education at Zuokumor Primary School in Burutu L.G.A of Delta State between 1981 and 1986. His secondary education was at Gbesa Grammar School Ojobo, between 1986 and 1992.

He is married to Anthonia Fufeyin and they have five children. He was born in a polygamous home and is the 22nd child out of the 36 children sired by his late father, Livingson Stevenson Toboukeyei Fufeyin. His mother's name is Asetu Fufeyin.

== Criticism and controversy ==
Fufeyin has been criticized for his loud acts of charity, very public and showy focus on demons and "deliverance" in his ministry today. During the COVID-19 pandemic, he donated about N300million to staff, members of his church and to the Nigerian government. Fufeyin also returned their tithes and offerings, saying that it was time of giving back.

On 1 April 2017, Fufeyin defended Suleman Johnson against his sex scandal, describing him as "innocent."

In April 2022, Fufeyin took Pastor Johnmark Ighosotu to court, alleging character defamation and cyber conspiracies following a confession in Ighosotu's church which contained accusations Fufeyin engaged in fraudulent activities.

On 22 March 2023, his church was destroyed by fire and he claimed the reason for the fire was because of his disobedience to God's instruction.

On 9 January 2024, following the BBC' allegations of physical and sexual abuse, fake miracles, and forced abortions in the Synagogue Church of All Nations under the late leader T.B. Joshua, Fufeyin criticized Joshua's former inner circle for not speaking up in Joshua's defense. He also urged his supporters to speak up in his defense against the allegations levelled against him by his enemies.

In 2024, a legal battle erupted between Fufeyin and Nigerian social media activist Martins Vincent Otse, popularly known as VeryDarkMan. The controversy centers around VeryDarkMan's outspoken criticism of Fufeyin 's miracle products, including soap and mustard seeds, which the prophet claims have healing properties. VeryDarkMan publicly questioned the legitimacy of these products, demanding that Fufeyin provide evidence of their certification by Nigeria's regulatory body, NAFDAC.

In response, Fufeyin filed a ₦1 billion defamation lawsuit against VeryDarkMan, alleging that the activist's posts on social media caused significant damage to his reputation. The lawsuit also sought an injunction to stop VeryDarkMan from making further defamatory statements. The court granted a restraining order against VeryDarkMan, barring him from posting any additional content related to Fufeyin while the case is ongoing.
