= Anglican Diocese of Ndokwa =

Anglican diocese in Nigeria

Coordinates: 5°51′N 6°09′E

The Anglican Diocese of Ndokwa is one of 13 dioceses within the Anglican Province of Bendel, itself one of 14 ecclesiastical provinces within the Church of Nigeria. The current bishop is the Rt. Rev'd Festus Uzorka Nwafili.

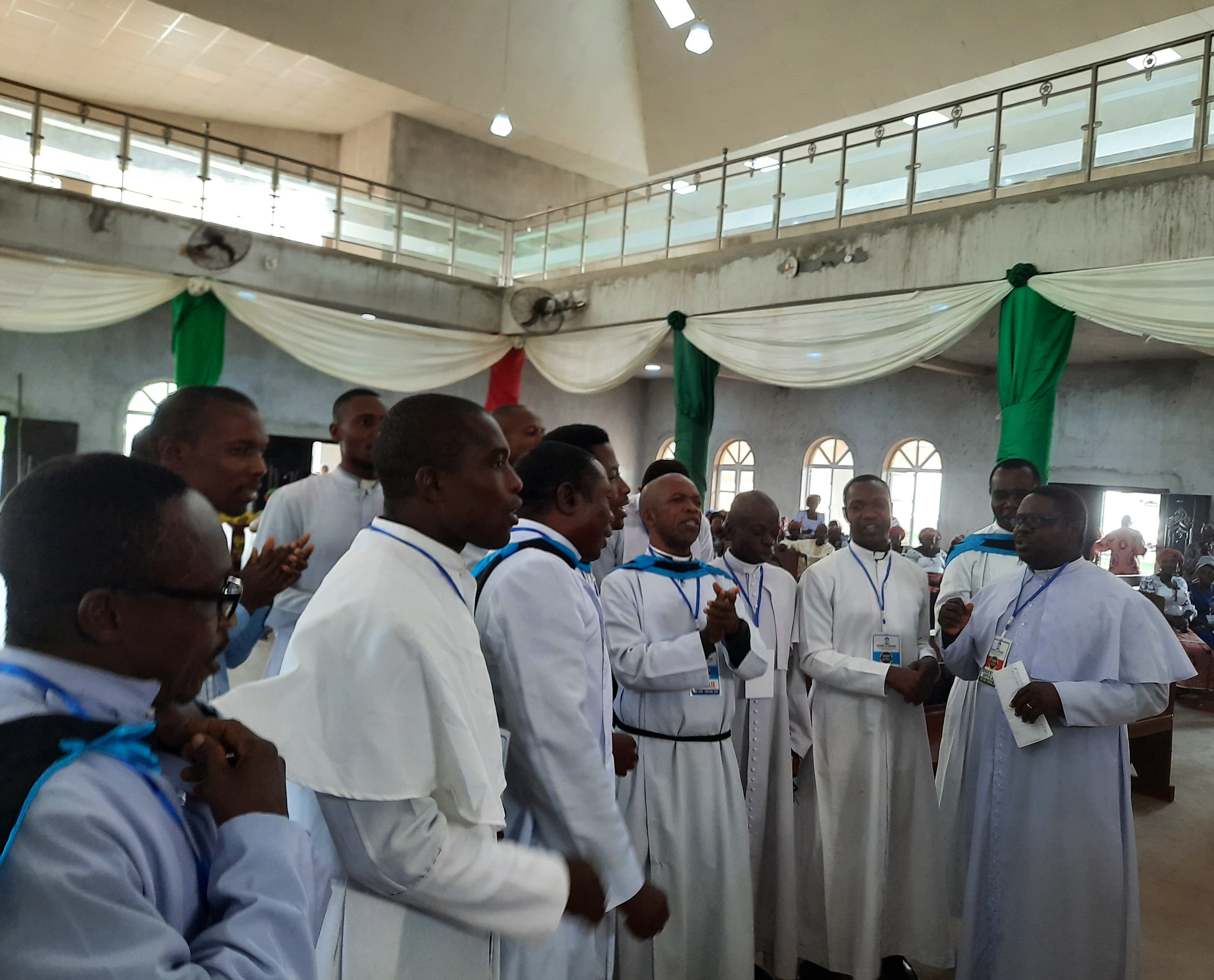

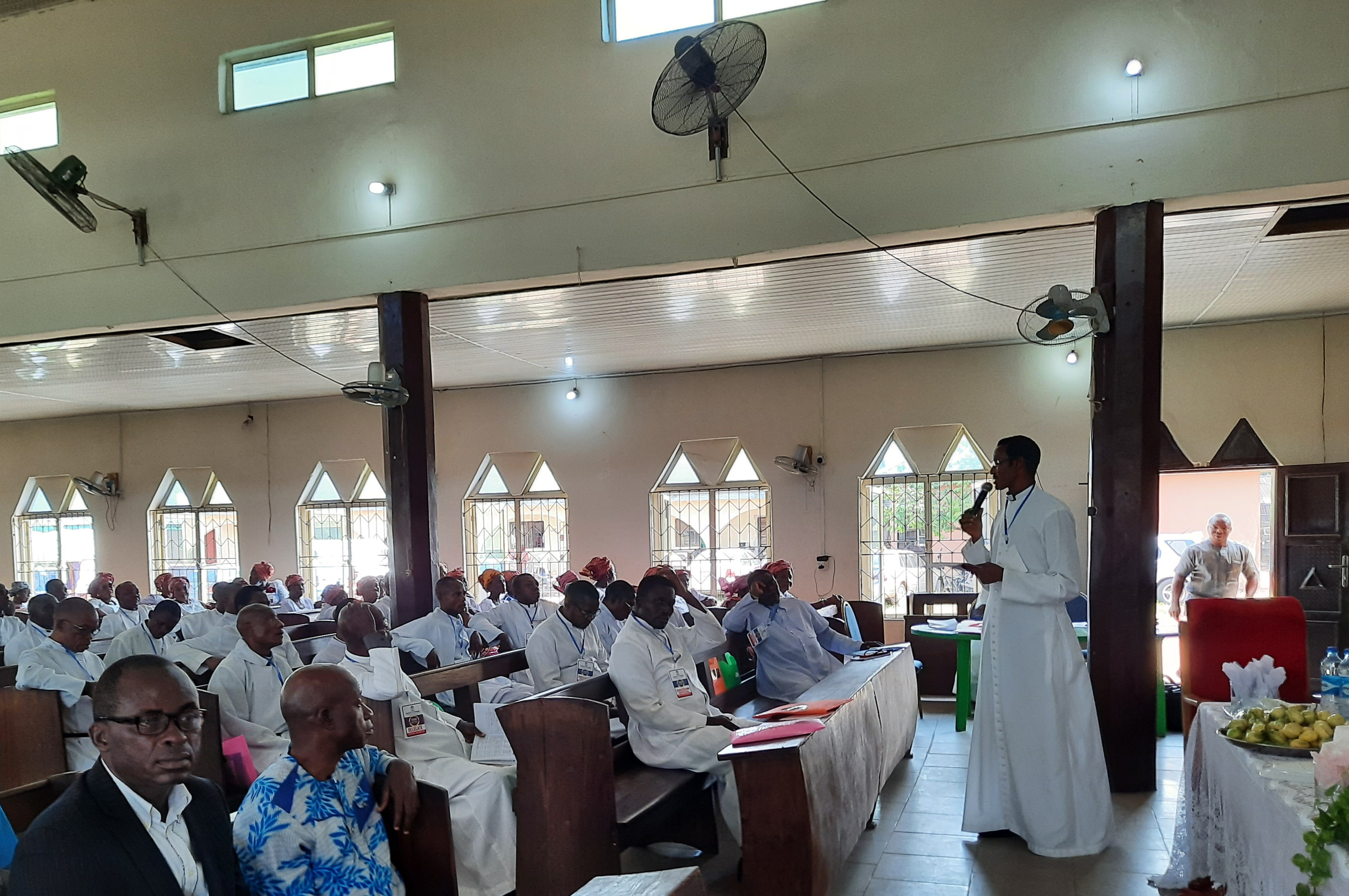

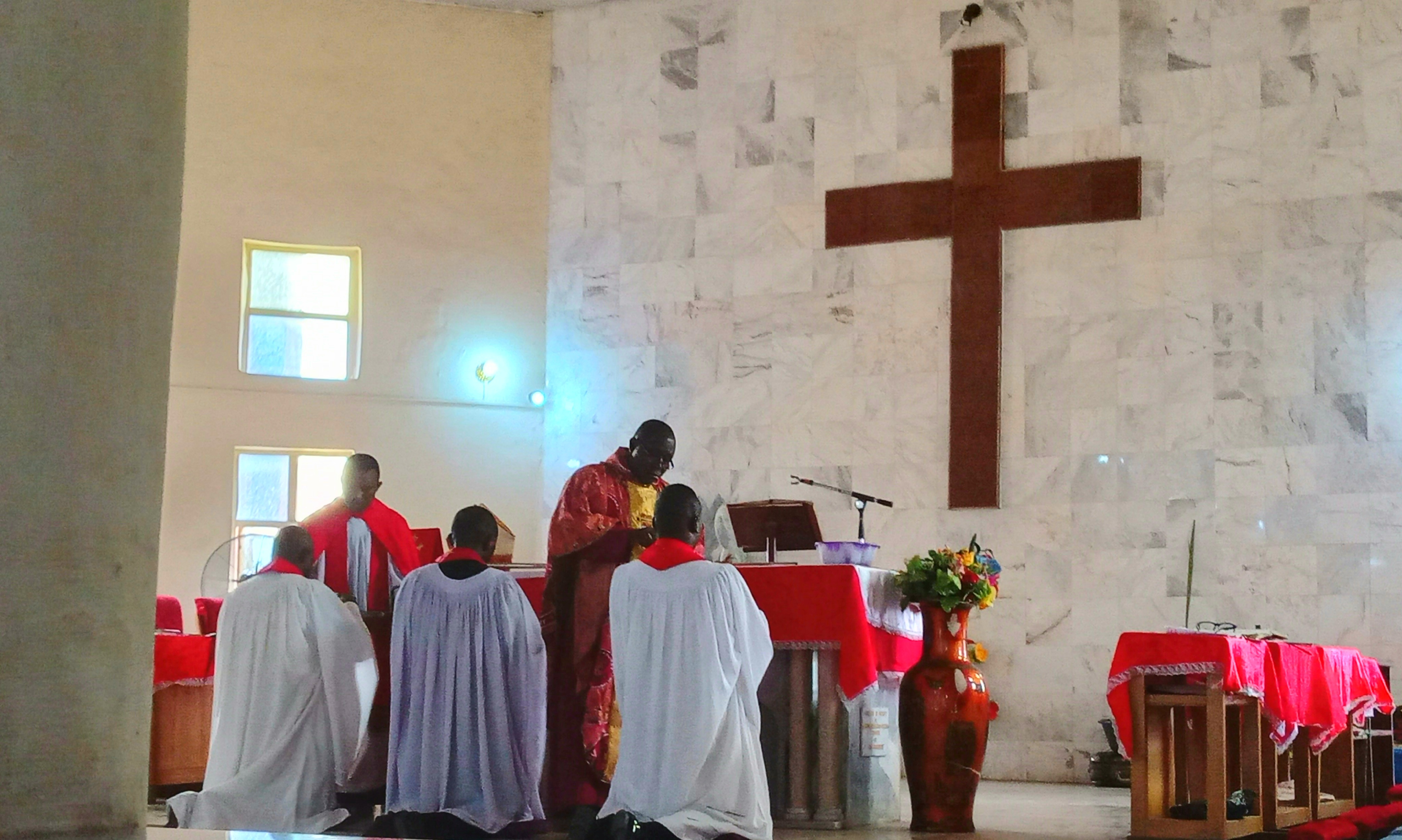

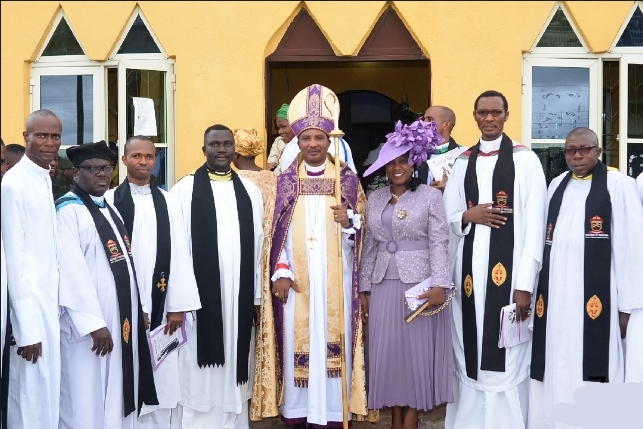

== Inauguration ==
The Diocese of Ndokwa was inaugurated on the 4th of June 2008 with the Right Rev. David Obiosa as the pioneer bishop.
