= Anglican Diocese of Sabongidda-Ora =

Anglican diocese in Nigeria

Coordinates: 6°30′N 6°00′E

The Anglican Diocese of Sabongidda-Ora is one of 12 within the Anglican Province of Bendel, itself one of 14 ecclesiastical provinces within the Church of Nigeria. The current bishop is the Right Rev. Augustine Ohilebo.
