= Ubogo =

Ubogo Убого Uboga
- Village
- Location within North Macedonia
- Coordinates: 41.6403°N 21.9475°E
- Country: North Macedonia
- Region: Vardar
- Municipality: Gradsko

Population (2002)
  - Total: 130
- Time zone: UTC+1 (CET)
  - Summer (DST): UTC+2 (CEST)
- Car plates: VE
- Website: .

Ubogo (Macedonian: Убого, Albanian: Uboga) is an abandoned village in the municipality of Gradsko, North Macedonia.

== Demographics ==
The settlement last had inhabitants in the 1981 census, where it was recorded as being populated by 13 Albanians and 2 "others".

According to the 2002 census, the village had 0 inhabitants.
