= Tickle.com =

American media company

Tickle Inc.
- Company type: Subsidiary
- Available in: multilingual
- Founded: 1999
- Headquarters: San Francisco, California, {{{location_country}}}
- Owner: Monster.com
- Key people: James Currier
- Website: www.tickle.com
- Current status: shut down

Tickle Inc. (formerly known as Emode.com) was a media company providing self-discovery and social networking services.

Tickle survived the dot-com bubble burst of 2000, became profitable in early 2002, was merged into Monster.com in May 2004, and became part of the overall Monster network. In April 2008, it was announced that Tickle.com would be shut down at the end of June 2008, The site was permanently shut down on December 31, 2008.

Tickle was founded in 1999 as Emode.com Tickle focused on quizzes and tests for both entertainment and self-discovery. In January 2009, Monster launched a new quiz website entitled TestQ, which focuses on career-related content and 'PhD quizzes'.
