= Anglican Diocese of Ughelli =

Anglican diocese in Nigeria

Coordinates: 5°30′N 5°59′E

The Anglican Diocese of Ughelli is one of 11 dioceses within the Anglican Province of Bendel, itself one of 14 ecclesiastical provinces within the Church of Nigeria. The current bishop is the Right Rev. Cyril Odutemu, who in 2020 became Archbishop of the Province.
