= Anglican Diocese of Warri =

Anglican diocese in Nigeria

Coordinates: 5°31′N 5°45′E

The Anglican Diocese of Warri is one of 12 dioceses within the Anglican Province of Bendel, itself one of 14 ecclesiastical provinces within the Church of Nigeria. The current bishop is Christian Esezi Ide.

John Onyaene Dafiewhare was enthroned as the first Bishop of Warri on 28 January 1980 (Dafiewhare died in 1994). Nathaniel Enuku took over the see from April 1992 until March 2003, and was followed in 2006, after a hiatus of 3 years, by Christian Esezi Ide.

Bishop	Years
John Onyaene Dafiewhare	1980–1992
Nathaniel Enuku	1992–2003
Christian Esezi Ide	2006–

== See also ==
- Anglican Adam Preaching Society
- Cornelius Adam Igbudu
