= Anglican Diocese of Sapele =

Anglican diocese in Nigeria

Coordinates: 5°51′N 6°09′E

The Anglican Diocese of Sapele lies within the Anglican Province of Bendel, one of 14 ecclesiastical provinces within the Church of Nigeria. The current bishop is the Right Rev. Blessing Erifeta.
