= Peter Imasuen =

Anglican bishop in Nigeria

Peter Imasuen is an Anglican bishop in Nigeria.

Imasuen is the current Bishop of Benin; he was enthroned as Bishop of Benin in 2004.
