= Ughelli South =

- LGA
- Interactive map of Ughelli South
- Coordinates: 5°20′N 5°57′E
- Country: Nigeria
- State: Delta State
- Headquarters: Otu-Jeremi

Area
  - Total: 786 km^{2} (303 sq mi)

Population (2006)
  - Total: 212,638
  - Density: 271/km^{2} (701/sq mi)
- Time zone: UTC+1 (WAT)
- Postal code: 333

Ughelli South is a Local Government Area of Delta State, Nigeria. It is made up of six Urhobo kingdoms namely: Ughievwen, Otor, Eghwu Arhavwarien, Effurun, Okparabe and Olomu. Otu Jeremi is the headquarters of Ughelli South LGA. It is the fourth most populated local government in Delta State.

It had an area of 786 square kilometres (303 sq mi) and a population of 212,638 as of the 2006 census. The postal code of the area is 333.

== Towns and villages ==
- Ewu
- Imode
- Egbo-Uhurie
- Arhagba
- Ophorigbala
- Ekakpamre
- Otokutu
- Ekrejegbe
- Ekrokpe
- Eyara
- Oginibo
- Urhiephron
- Okwagbe
- Olomu
- Owahwa

== Notable individuals from Ughelli South ==
- Akpor Pius Ewherido
- Francis E. Waive - Member of House of Representatives (Nigeria)
- Hrm.Dr Mathew Ediri Egbi- Owawha(11) Okobaro of Ughievwen
