= Alfred Rewane =

Nigerian businessman (1916–1995)

- Born: Ogbeyiwa Erewarone; August 24, 1916; Warri, Nigeria
- Died: October 6, 1995 (aged 79); Ikeja, Lagos, Nigeria
- Occupation: businessman
- Known for: financier of NADECO
- Political party: Action Group
- Father: Chief Jemide Erewarone

Chief Alfred Rewane (August 24, 1916 – October 6, 1995) was a Nigerian businessman. He was murdered on October 6, 1995 at his residence in Ikeja, Lagos. He was a financier of NADECO and was a close associate of Obafemi Awolowo.

== Life ==
Rewane's full name at birth was Ogbeyiwa Erewarone, he was born in Warri to the family of Jemide Erewarone. His father was a trader who was based in Agbor, when his father was away from Warri, Rewane stayed with his uncle who was religious at the time and it was he who gave Rewane the first name Alfred. He was educated at the African School and then the Government School, both in Warri. Though he was admitted to Dennis Memorial Grammar School for secondary school education, Rewane did not proceed further in his education. He started his career as a manager trainee with UAC and became the beach master, Lagos Customs Wharf for the firm. In the 1940s he left UAC and focused on importing goods, especially cow bones and black pepper and then in the 1950s, he was also into the timber trade and he owned the Rex club in Yaba, Lagos where Bobby Benson was a regular musician. During the pre-independence era in Nigeria, Rewane was affiliated with the Action Group, he became the chairman of the Western Region Development Company which was controlled by the Action Group led regional government.

In the 1970s, Rewane promoted a series of businesses in Sapele partnership with the Seaboard Corporation of the United States. The companies included Life Flour mills, West African Shrimps and Top Feeds.

In the 1990s, Rewane's residence in Lagos was the venue of political meetings that led to the formation of National Democratic Coalition (NADECO). He was known as a major financier of the group which was vocal in its opposition to the military regime of Sani Abacha. The Nigerian police arrested 7 persons in connection with his murder but 5 of the suspects died while in detention, the remaining two were freed based on weak evidence from the prosecution.
