= Scalr =

Cloud computing company in United States

- Developers: Scalr, Inc.
- Stable release: 8.70
- Operating system: Web-based Application
- Type: Cloud computing
- License: Commercial
- Website: http://www.scalr.com/

Scalr is an American cloud computing company specializing in automation and collaboration software for Terraform.

== History ==
Scalr was founded by Sebastian Stadil in 2007 to help standardize processes across IT teams. It later became a hybrid cloud management platform and was incorporated in 2011. Scalr raised $7.35 Million in Series A funding from OpenView Venture Partners in 2016. References
