= Anglican Diocese of Western Izon =

Anglican diocese in Nigeria

Coordinates: 5°10′N 5°56′E

The Anglican Diocese of Western Izon is one of 12 dioceses within the Anglican Province of Bendel, itself one of 14 ecclesiastical provinces within the Church of Nigeria. The current bishop is the Right Rev. Edafe Emamezi.
