= Blessing Erifeta =

Anglican bishop of Nigeria

Blessing Avbenayeri Erifeta (born 17 April 1964) is the incumbent Bishop of Sapele in the Anglican Province of Bendel in the Church of Nigeria.

Erifeta is a graduate of Immanuel College of Theology, Ibadan; Delta State University, Abraka (B.A (Ed) Hons, 2004); National Open University of Nigeria (M.Sc. PCR) and Crowther Graduate Theology Seminary, Abeokuta ((M.Div) 2011).

He was installed as the first Bishop of the Anglican Diocese of Sapele on 12 January 2009.

Erifeta was involved in a long-running dispute in 2015 and 2016 with his parishioners over alleged financial irregularities. Erifeta received the support of Nicholas Okoh, the primate of the Church of Nigeria, on 23 March 2017.

Bishop Erifeta and the entire Sapele Diocese on their 15th anniversary, awarded Governor Oborevwori who emphasized the importance of unity within the Sapele Diocese of the Anglican Communion. He highlighted the role of peace in fostering growth and development within any nation.
