= Cyril Odutemu =

Anglican bishop in Nigeria

Cyril Odutemu is an Anglican archbishop in Nigeria.

Odutemu is Bishop of Ughelli and Archbishop of Bendel.

== See also ==
- Cornelius Adam Igbudu
