= Augustine Ohilebo =

Anglican bishop of Nigeria

Augustine Ohilebo is an Anglican bishop in Nigeria.

Ohilebo is the current Bishop of Sabongidda-Ora: he was consecrated in August, 2017 at St. John's Anglican Cathedral, Bendel. He was educated at Ambrose Alli University and ordained in 2004.
