= Anglican Diocese of Ika =

Anglican diocese in Nigeria

Coordinates: 6°15′9.93″N 6°11′58.79″E

The Anglican Diocese of Ika is one of 12 dioceses within the Anglican Province of Bendel, itself one of 14 ecclesiastical provinces within the Church of Nigeria. The current bishop is the Right Rev. Godfrey Ifeanyichukwu Ekpenisi.

The previous bishop was Peter Imhona Onekpe who left in 2018; he was the pioneer bishop when the Diocese of Ika was created in 2001.
