= Aladja =

Town in Delta State, Nigeria

Coordinates: 05°20′00″N 06°11′00″E

Aladja is a coastal town in the udu local government area of Delta State, Nigeria. It is located on the bank of southern part of River Warri.

The majority of the people are of Udu, group of Urhobo ethnic group.

The Delta Steel Company (DSC), an integrated steel manufacturing industry, spans land provided by both Ovwian and Aladja communities. It was one of the largest steel plants in Africa when it was built in 1980. Between 1995 and 2004 it was the main employer and a steel town grew around it, though it is now uninhabited. In 2021 the steel plant was still operating but at a minimal level.

Aladja, as a coastal community, has been a haven of commerce between the coastal people and hinterland since ancient times. The act of trade by barter is still being practiced in the popular Aladja Market. Aladja has served for many decades as the route to old Warri mainland via its famous 'Aladja Waterside' until the construction of the Udu Bridge in 1975 as an alternative route to Warri and its environs.

== Notable people ==
- Richard Mofe Damijo (Nigerian actor)
