= Godfrey Ifeanyichukwu Ekpenisi =

Anglican bishop in Nigeria

Godfrey Ifeanyichukwu Ekpenisi (born 26 January 1969) is an Anglican bishop in Nigeria.

Ekpenisi, a former Archdeacon, is the current Bishop of Ika; he was enthroned on 15 December 2018.

Ekpenisi was born on 26 January 1969 in Agbor, Delta State. He grew up in Asaba, attending St. Patrick's College from 1979 to 1984, followed by St. Thomas Teacher Training College in Ibusa until 1987. He graduated in Mathematics from the University of Benin in 1997 and in Theology from St. Paul's College, Awka in 2001. He is also a graduate of the University of Abuja where he bagged a first class degree in religion.
