= Anglican Diocese of Benin =

Anglican diocese in Nigeria

Coordinates: 6°20′00″N 5°37′20″E

The Anglican Diocese of Benin, an area within a province overseen by a bishop, is one of 12 dioceses within the Anglican Province of Bendel, itself one of 14 ecclesiastical provinces within the Church of Nigeria the Anglican Communion's most populous province.

The current bishop is the Right Rev. Peter Imasuen.
