= Otor-Udu =

Coordinates: 5°27′7.7″N 5°52′7.51″E

- Town
- Interactive map of Otor-Udu
- Country: Nigeria
- State: Delta State
- LGA: Udu
- Time zone: UTC+1 (WAT)
  - Summer (DST): UTC=

Otor Udu is a town in Delta State in Nigeria. It is the local government headquarters for the Udu area and is the ancestral home of people connected or related to Udu.The Udu people also have its own special dialect slightly different from the central Urhobo language of Agbarho .

In late 2016 Otor-Udu and other Udu communities were engaged in a border dispute with Ughievwen communities in Ughelli South LGAs of Delta State. A court case was concluded in 2020, with the high Court in Otor-Udu ruling that Orhuwhorun is part of the Udu Community and legally cannot be a separate kingdom from the existing Udu Kingdom.

== See also ==
- Udu, Nigeria
