= John Aruakpor =

Nigerian Anglican Bishop (born 1960)

The Rt Reverend John Aruakpor
- Bishop Diocese of Oleh
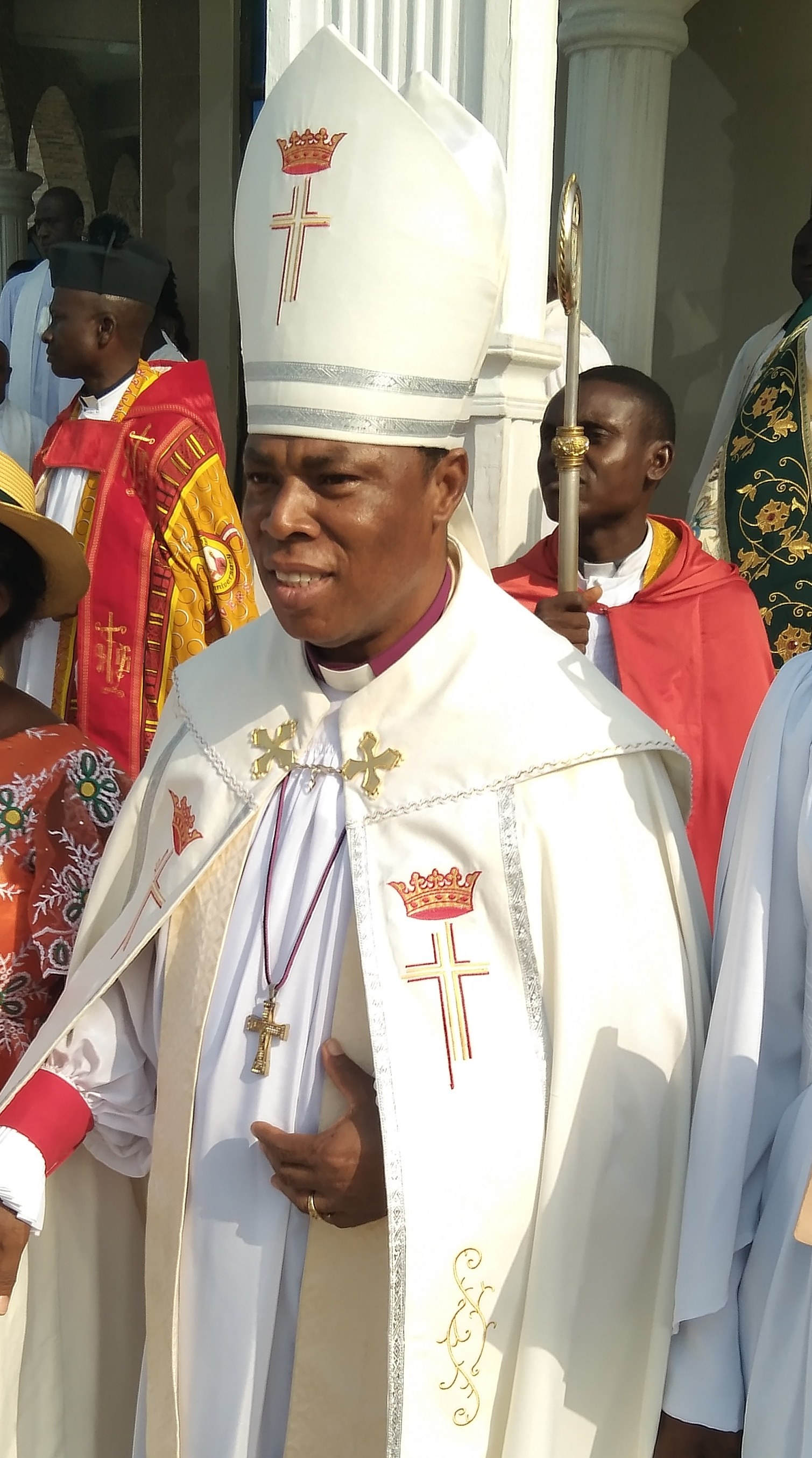
- Church: Church of Nigeria
- Diocese: Diocese of Oleh
- Elected: March 2012
- Installed: July 2012
- Predecessor: Jonathan Edewor

Orders
- Consecration: 2012 (Note: Sources differ on when in 2012 Aruakpor was consecrated. The Anglican Communion News Service and World Anglican report his consecration date as 29 July 2012. Vanguard reports his consecration as occurring in May 2012.) by Nicholas Okoh

Personal details
- Born: 10 February 1960 (age 66)

John Usiwoma Aruakpor (born 10 February 1960) is the Nigerian bishop of Anglican Diocese of Oleh in the Church of Nigeria.

Aruakpor was elected bishop for the Diocese of Oleh in March 2012. He was consecrated and enthroned in July 2012.
