= Delta State =

State in Nigeria

Delta
- State
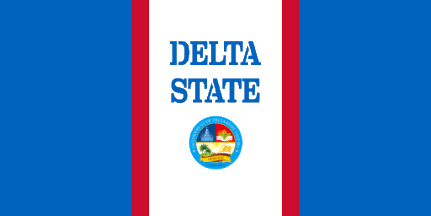
- Flag Seal
- Nicknames: The Big Heart
- Location of Delta State in Nigeria
- Coordinates: 5°30′N 6°00′E
- Country: Nigeria
- LGAs: 25
- Date created: 27 August 1991
- Capital: Asaba

Government
  - Governor: Sheriff Oborevwori (APC)
  - Deputy Governor: Monday Onyeme (APC)
  - Legislature: Delta State House of Assembly
  - Senators: C: Ede Dafinone (APC); N: Ned Nwoko (APC); S: Joel-Onowakpo Thomas (APC)
  - Representatives: List

Area
  - Total: 17,698 km^{2} (6,833 sq mi)
  - Rank: 23rd of 36

Population (2006 census)
  - Total: 4,112,445
  - Estimate (2024): 7,840,000
  - Rank: 15th of 36
  - Density: 232.37/km^{2} (601.83/sq mi)
- Demonym: Deltan

GDP (PPP)
  - Year: 2021
  - Total: $40.05 billion 5th of 36
  - Per capita: $6,025; 6th of 36
- Time zone: UTC+01 (WAT)
- postal code: 320001
- ISO 3166 code: NG-DE
- HDI (2022): 0.607 medium · 13th of 37
- Website: www.deltastate.gov.ng

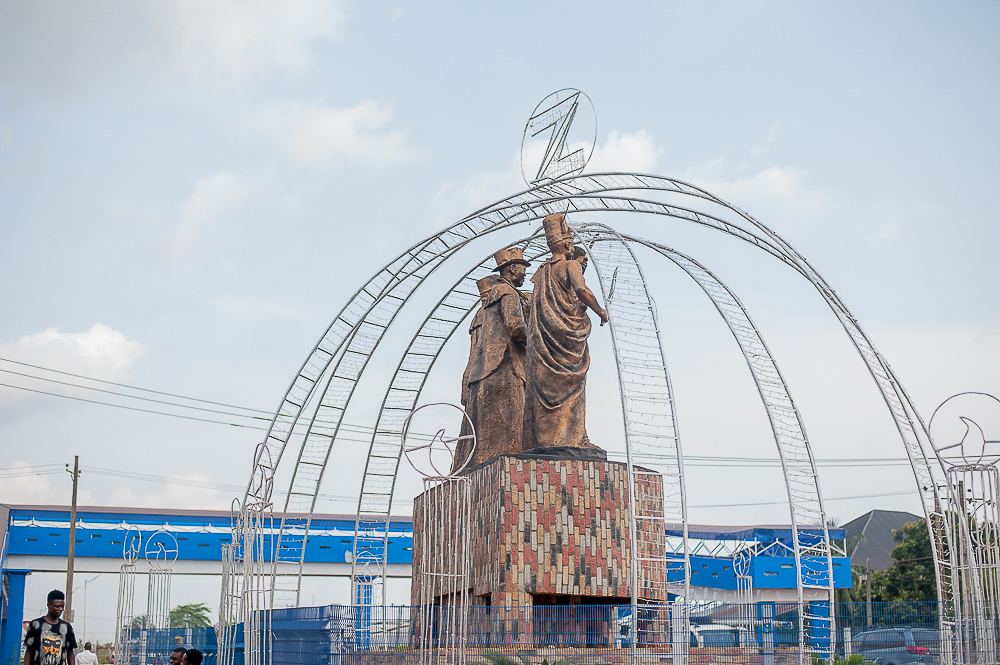
Asaba roundabout, Asaba, Delta State

Delta is a state in the South-South geopolitical zone of Nigeria. Named after the Niger Delta—a large part of which is in the state—the state was formed from the former Bendel State on 27 August 1991. It is bordered on the north by Edo State, the east by Anambra and Rivers states, and the south by Bayelsa State while to the west by Ondo State, and the Bight of Benin which covers about 160 kilometres of the state's coastline. The state was initially created with 12 local government areas in 1991, but was later expanded to 19 and now has 25 local government areas. Its capital city is Asaba which is located along the River Niger on the northeastern end of the state, while the state's economic center is the city of Warri on the southwestern coastline.

Of the 36 states, Delta is the 23rd largest in the area and twelfth most populous with an estimated population of over 7.8 million as of 2024. Geographically, the state is divided between the Central African mangroves in the coastal southwest and the Nigerian lowland forests in most of the rest of the state as a small portion of the Niger Delta swamp forests are in the far south. The other important geographical features are the River Niger and its distributary, the Forçados River, which flow along Delta's eastern and southern borders, respectively; while fellow Niger distributary, the Escravos River, runs through Warri and the coastal areas are riddled with dozens of smaller Niger distributaries that are components of the western Niger Delta. Much of the state's nature contains threatened dwarf crocodile, Grey parrot, African fish eagle, mona monkey, and African manatee populations along with potentially extirpated populations of African leopard and Nigeria-Cameroon chimpanzee. Offshore, the state is also biodiverse as there are populations of Lesser African threadfin, crabs, and blue mussel along with various cetacean species.

What is now Delta State has been inhabited for years by various ethnic groups, consisting of the Isoko and Urhobo in the centre of the state; Anioma people to the north; and the Ijaw, Itsekiri, and also the Urhobo, in the southwest. In the pre-colonial period, the now-Delta State was divided into various monarchial states like the Kingdom of Warri, Aboh and Agbon Kingdom before the area became a part of the British Oil Rivers Protectorate in 1884. In the early 1900s, the British incorporated the protectorate (now renamed the Niger Coast Protectorate) into the Southern Nigeria Protectorate which later amalgamated into British Nigeria. However, colonial forces did not gain permanent control of modern-day Delta State until the 1910s, due to the uprisings of the Ekumeku Movement. Notably, Delta has one of the few parts of Nigeria to have been under French control as the UK leased the enclave of Forcados to France from 1903 to 1930.

After independence in 1960, the area of now-Delta was a part of the post-independence Western Region until 1963 when the region was split and the area became part of the Mid-Western Region. In 1967, the Eastern Region attempted to secede as the state of Biafra and invaded the Mid-Western Region in an attempt to capture Lagos and end the war quickly; Biafran forces were halted and eventually pushed back but briefly declared the captured Mid-Western Region (including now-Delta State) as the Republic of Benin. Similarly, upon the liberation of the Mid-West, Nigerian forces committed the Asaba massacre against ethnic Igbos in Asaba. At the war's end and the reunification of Nigeria, the Mid-Western Region was reformed until 1976 when it was renamed Bendel State. In 1991, Bendel State was split with the north becoming Edo State and the south becoming Delta State.

Economically, Delta State is based around the production of crude oil and natural gas as one of the main oil-producing states in the country. Key minor industries involve agriculture as the state has substantial oil palm, yam, and cassava crops along with fishing and heliciculture. In large part due to its vast oil revenues, Delta has the fourth highest Human Development Index in the country; however, disputes between oil companies and local communities along with years of systemic corruption have led to hostilities that are often tied to the lack of development in host communities.

== Geography ==
Delta State covers a landmass of about 18,050 km^{2} (6,970 mi^{2}), of which more than 60% is land. The state lies approximately between 5°00' and 6°45' E and 5°00' and 6°30' N. It is geographically located in Nigeria's Midwest, bounded in the north and west by Edo State for 350 km (218 miles), the east by Anambra, and Rivers States for about 93 km and about 46 km respectively, southeast by Bayelsa State across the Niger River for 17 km and the Forçados River for 198 km, and on the southern extreme is the Bight of Benin which covers about 160 kilometres of the state's coastline. Delta State is generally low-lying without any remarkable hills. The state has a wide coastal belt inter-laced with rivulets and streams, which form part of the Niger Delta.

=== Climate ===
An important characteristic of the Climate of Delta State is flooding. The ecological attributes of Delta State also include heavy rainfall, which causes the state, like other states in the Niger-Delta Nigeria, to be regarded as lowland rainforest, freshwater swamp and mangrove swamp. Delta State has a mean rainfall of 36.9 mm, as well as an increase in rainfall which in the year 2015 resulted in inundation of farmlands in the state. 2015 was also the year the state had the highest rainfall, amounting to 3183.6 mm. In the year 2007, the state had the lowest rainfall over the 11-year period, amounting to an annual rainfall of 2030.58 mm. While January has the lowest rainfall in the state, in July, rainfall is very high at 423.2 mm.

== History ==
Delta State was defined out of the former Bendel State on 27 August 1991. The state was actualized following agitations for the realization of a separate distinct state by the peoples of the old Delta Province. There was yet another state request proposed as "Anioma State", comprising the Asaba and Agbor Divisions of the old Midwest region. The then military President, Gen. Ibrahim Babangida, recognized Delta State but chose "Asaba", a prominent town within the Northwestern Lower Niger, as the capital city. The proposed capital was a virgin land in the heart of the two constituent divisions that constitutes the Northwestern Lower Niger. Delta state was once integrated in the Mid Western State from 1963 to 1976, and later Bendel State, from 1976 to 1991. The name "Bendel" (Ben-Del) was coined from the old Benin and Delta Provinces of Western Region-Delta to reflect the integration of Benin and Delta provinces.

=== Politics ===
The state government is governed by an elected governor who works closely with members of the state's House of Assembly.

=== Electoral system ===
The electoral system of each state is selected using a modified two-round system. To be elected in the first round, a candidate must receive the plurality of the vote and over 25% of the vote in at least two-thirds of the state local government areas. If no candidate passes a threshold, a second round will be held between the top candidate and the next candidate to have received a plurality of votes in the highest number of local government Areas.

== Demographics ==
Delta State is predominantly inhabited by the Urhobo, Anioma, Isoko, Uvwie, Okpe, Ijaw, Itsekiri and the Olukumi people. The populations of other groups in the state are negligible.

The Urhobo-Isoko are basically the same people, and are the most predominant people inhabiting the state and currently about 2.3 million spanning across 13 local government areas, followed by the Igbo speaking people Ukwuani, Ika, Aniocha and Oshimili people of Delta State with a population of about 1.8 million spanning across 9 Local government areas who are sometimes referred to as the Anioma people. The Itsekiri, the third largest, with an estimated population of 1.035 million people.

They are also known for their rich cultural heritage.

The Okpe is a dialect of the Urhobo language. The Okpe people occupy two local government areas (Sapele and Okpe) in Delta Central.

The Ijaws are a group of people related to the predominant people of neighbouring Bayelsa State, while the Olukumi are becoming culturally and linguistically extinct, due to acculturation and assimilation.

The vast majority of inhabitants are Christian, with very few practicing traditional religions.

The Catholic Church includes the Diocese of Warri (1964) with 135 parishes under Bishop Anthony Ovayero Ewherido (2022), and parts of Bomadi (1991) under Bishop Hyacinth Oroko Egbebo (2009), both suffragans of the Archdiocese of Benin City.

The Bendel Province of the Anglican Church of Nigeria under Archbishop Cyril Odutemu (2020) includes the Dioceses of Asaba (1977) led by Bishop Kingsley Chukwukamadu Obuh (2022), Ika (2001) led by Bishop Godfrey Ifeanyichukwu Ekpenisi (2018), Ndokwa (2008) led by Bishop Festus Nwafili (2023), Sapele (2009) led by Bishop Blessing Erifeta (2009), Ughelli led by Bishop Cyril Odutemu, Warri (1980) led by Bishop Christian Esezi Ide (2006) and Western Izon (2005) led by Bishop Victor Okporu (2021).

== Administration ==
Sheriff Oborevwori, a member of the People's Democratic Party, was elected governor and chief executive of Delta State in March 2023. His deputy is Monday Onyeme. The state has three national senatorial districts (South, North and Central). In 2011 and 2013, the elected senators were James Manager, Arthur Okowa Ifeanyi and Emmanuel Aguariavwodo who replaced Pius Ewherido who died in 2013 at National Hospital, Abuja. In 2015, Chief Ighoyeta Amori was elected Senator of Delta Central but his election was annulled and Senator Ovie Omo-Agege sworn in as Senator of Delta Central, James Manager retained his position and Chief Peter Nwaoboshi was elected Senator of Delta North. The Executive, Legislative and Judicial Chambers are housed in Asaba with a government house annex in Warri.

=== Past and present administrations ===
- Sheriff Oborevwori - 29 May 2023 to date (APC)
- Ifeanyi Okowa - 29 May 2015 to 29 May 2023 (PDP)
- Emmanuel Uduaghan - 29 May 2007 to 29 May 2015 (PDP)
- James Ibori - 29 May 1999 to 29 May 2007 (PDP)
- Walter Feghabo - 12 August 1998 to 29 May 1999 (military)
- John Dungs - 22 August 1996 to 12 August 1998 (military)
- Ibrahim Kefas - 26 September 1994 to 22 August 1996 (military)
- Bassey Asuquo - 10 December 1993 to 26 September 1994 (military)
- Abdulkadir Shehu - 17 November 1993 – 10 December 1993 (military)
- Luke Chijiuba Ochulor - 28 August 1991 - January 1992 (military)
- Felix Ibru - January 1992 - November 1993 (SDP)

=== Local government areas ===
Delta State consists of 25 local government areas (shown with 2006 population figures):

Delta Central Senatorial District	1,575,738	Delta North Senatorial District	1,293,074	Delta South Senatorial District	1,229,282
Ethiope East	200,942	Aniocha North	104,062	Bomadi	86,016
Ethiope West	202,712	Aniocha South	142,045	Burutu	207,977
Okpe	128,398	Ika North East	182,819	Isoko North	143,559
Sapele	174,273	Ika South	167,060	Isoko South	235,147
Udu	142,480	Ndokwa East	103,224	Patani	67,391
Ughelli North	320,687	Ndokwa West	150,024	Warri North	136,149
Ughelli South	212,638	Oshimili North	118,540	Warri South	311,970
Uvwie	188,728	Oshimili South	150,032	Warri South West	116,538
		Ukwuani	119,034		

== Local governments/Indigenous people ==
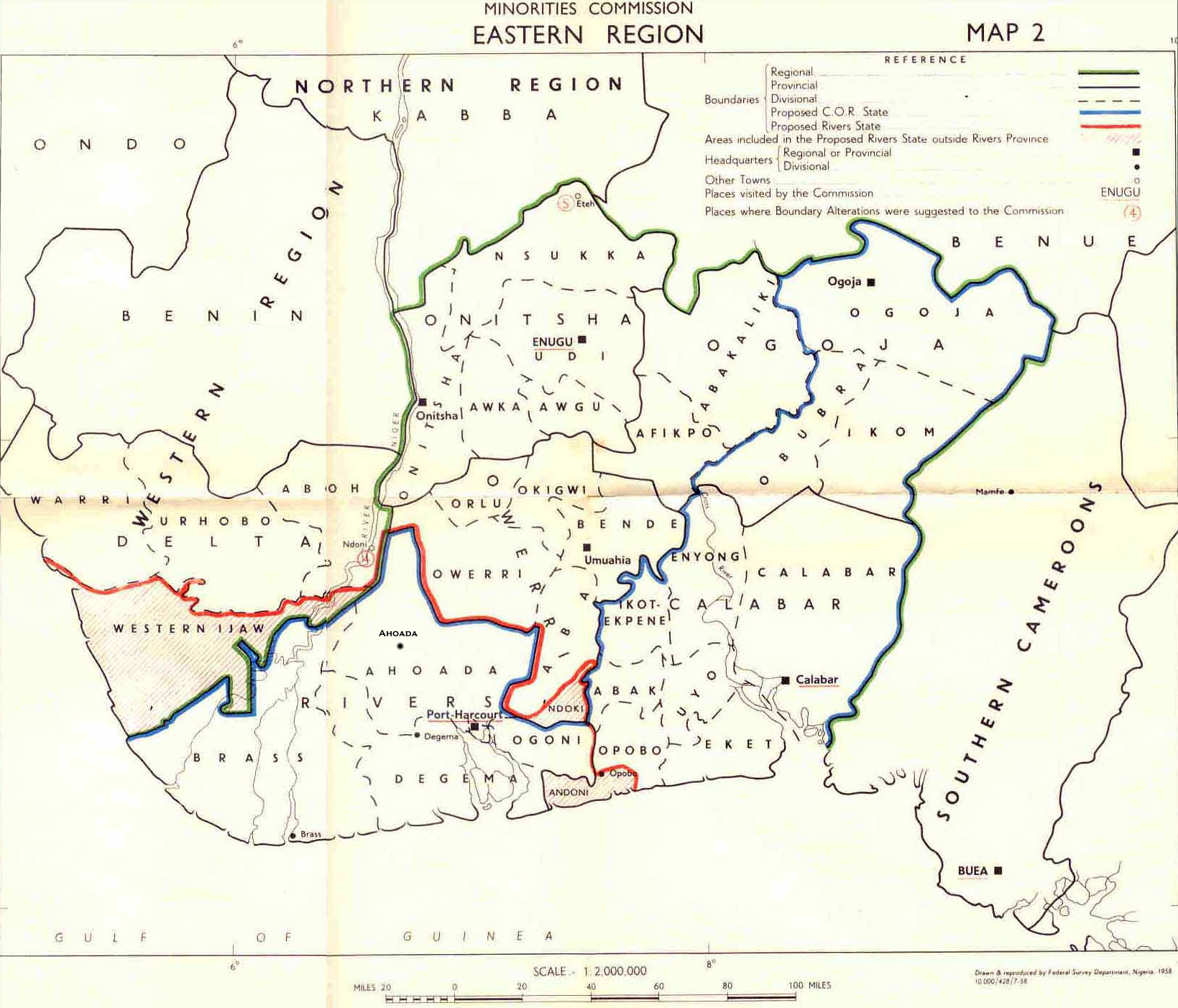
The British map of Eastern Nigeria, 1958

Indigenous ethnic groups of Delta State listed by LGA:

LGA	Headquarters	Indigenous people
Aniocha North	Issele-Uku	Enuani, Olukumi.
Aniocha South	Ogwashi-Uku	Enuani
Burutu	Burutu	Ijaw
Bomadi	Bomadi	Ijaw
Ethiope East	Isiokolo	Urhobo
Ethiope West	Oghara	Urhobo
Ika North East	Owa-Oyibu	Ika
Ika South	Agbor	Ika
Isoko North	Ozoro	Isoko
Isoko South	Oleh	Isoko
Ndokwa East	Aboh	Ukwuani, Isoko
Ndokwa West	Kwale	Ukwuani
Oshimili North	Akwukwu-Igbo	Enuani,
Oshimili South	Asaba	URHOBO
Okpe	Orerokpe	Urhobo
Patani	Patani	Ijaw, Urhobo
Sapele	Sapele	Urhobo
Udu	Otor-Udu	Urhobo
Ughelli North	Ughelli	Urhobo
Ughelli South	Otu-Jeremi	Urhobo
Ukwuani	Obiaruku	Ukwuani,
Uvwie	Effurun	Urhobo
Warri North	Koko	Urhobo, Ijaw, Itsekiri.
Warri South	Warri	Urhobo ,
Warri South West	Ogbe Ijaw	Urhobo,Ijaw , Itsekiri

== Economy ==
The state is one of the richer and more developed ones in Nigeria, and has the second-lowest incidence of extreme poverty (around 3% of the population against a national average of 31%), according to World Bank data from 2018.

=== Natural resources ===
There are various solid mineral deposits within the state - industrial clay, silica, lignite, kaolin, tar sand, decorative rocks, limestone, etc. These are raw materials for industries such as brick making, ceramics, bottle manufacturing, glass manufacturing, chemical/insulators production, chalk manufacturing and sanitary wares, decorative stone cutting and quarrying, but these minerals are under-utilized.

Delta state also has huge deposits of crude oil and is also one of the largest producers of petroleum products in Nigeria. Sales of petroleum products is what majorly drives its economy.

== Higher education ==
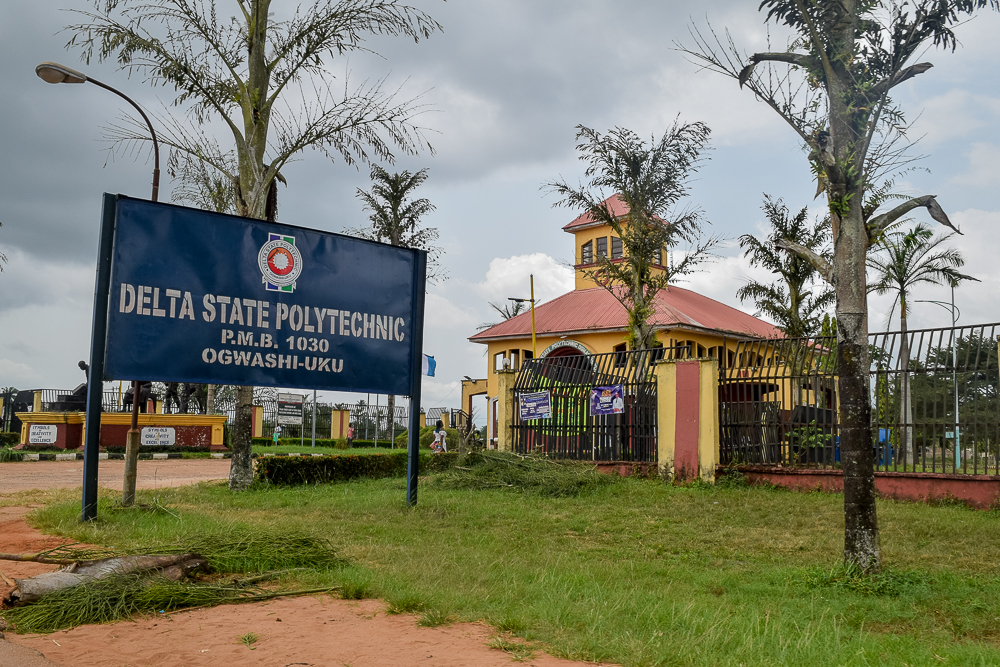
Delta State Polytechnic, Ogwashi-Uku, Delta state

Institutions of higher learning in Delta state include:

- Federal University of Petroleum Resources, Effurun
- Delta State University, Abraka
- Delta State University of Science and Technology, Ozoro
- Dennis Osadebe University, Anwai
- University of Delta, Agbor
- Delta State Polytechnics (two different Polytechnics, one at Oghara, and one at Ogwashi-Uku)
- The Film and Broadcast Academy, Ozoro
- College of Education Warri
- Federal College of Education Technical, Asaba
- College of Education, Mosogar
- Delta State College of Health Technology, Ofuoma, Ughelli
- Michael and Cecilia Ibru University, Ughelli
- Petroleum Training Institute, Effurun
- Western Delta University, Oghara
- Novena University, Ogume-Amai
- National Open University of Nigeria (three study centres, one at Asaba, one at Emevor and another at Owhrode)
- Delta State School of Marine Technology, Burutu
- Nigeria Maritime University, Okerenkoko, Warri South West
- Conarina School of Maritime & Transport Technology, Oria-Abraka
- University of Information and Communication Technology, Agbor
- State School of Midwifery, Asaba
- School of Nursing (two schools, one at Agbor and another at Warri)
- Baptist School of Nursing, Eku
- Edwin Clark University, Kiagbodo
- Eagle Heights University, Omadino, Warri
- Admiralty University of Nigeria at Ibusa and Sapele
- Adam Igbudu Christian Institute, Emevor (a private Nigerian university named after the founder of the Anglican Adam Preaching Society, Cornelius Adam Igbudu

== Transportation ==
Federal Highways are:

- A2 as the Elele-Alimini-Patani East-West Rd across the Forçados River from Bayelsa State by the 850 m bridge (2014) at Patani and north via Warri to Benin City,
- A232 (Trans-African Highway 8 Lagos-Mombasa) east from Edo State via Agbor and Asaba to Onitsha by the 1,404 m River Niger Bridge (1965).

Other major roads include:

- The Warri-Sakpoba Rd northeast from A2 at Ogharefe Junction to Edo State at Otefe
- the Agbor Eku Rd south from Agbor
- The Sakpoba Rd southwest from Agbor to Edo State at Ugbeka
- the Uromi Igbanke Rd north from A232 at Agbor to Edo State

Airports: Warri Airport or Osubi Airstrip, built by Shell Oil in 1999.

== Tourist attractions ==
Delta State has some historical, cultural and socio-political tourist centres that attract visitors from around the globe. Some of these sites of tourism include:

- The Nana's Palace built by Chief Nana Olomu of Ebrohim. He was a powerful 19th-century indigenous entrepreneur who traded with the British. The relationship eventually turned sour. Later, he surrendered (not without putting up a fight) and was exiled to Ghana. His personal effects are housed in this grand palace.
- The River Ethiope which is reputed to be the deepest inland waterway in Africa (at 176 km). Its source is at the foot of a giant silk-cotton tree at Umuaja in Ukwuani Local Government Area of the state and flows through seven Local Government Areas in the State. It is a place of worship for Olokun traditional religion and also a common site for faithful of the Igbe Religious Movement.
- The Araya Bible Site which houses a copy of the Holy Bible. It is believed that the bible descended to this spot miraculously from heaven around August 1914. The bible dropped on rain-soaked yam and it didn't get wet. The site now attracts thousands of Christians yearly.
- Demas Nwoko Edifice which was built using traditional materials, designs and construction techniques of the Igbo civilization by Demas Nwoko, an architect, builder and artist of international repute from Idumuje-Ugboko, in Aniocha North Local Government Area, Delta State.
- The Mungo Park House which is now the site of the National Museum, Asaba. The house was constructed by the Royal Niger Company (RNC) in 1886 and was used as a colonial administrative headquarters, a military house, the colonial administrative divisional headquarters, the RNC Constabulary building, and the seat of the Urban District Council at different times.
- The Abraka Turf and Country Club, Abraka features a horse club where an international polo tournament is held every year during Easter.
- The Niger Bridge which connects Delta State (by extension, western Nigeria) to the Eastern part of Nigeria. It is a beauty to behold. It was completed in 1965 and cost £5 million. It was damaged during the Civil War but later repaired.
- Lander Brothers Anchorage, Asaba which was built in memory of early British explorers. The complex has a museum, a graveyard, and many artworks and writings. It houses a replica of one of the boats that was used by the brothers.
- Falcorp Mangrove Park
- Warri Kingdom Royal Cemetery which is a 512-year-old burial ground and serves as the resting place of past rulers of the Warri kingdom. A tree is planted on each grave.
- Mungo Park House, Asaba is the first headquarters of the Royal Niger Company and Nigeria's first political headquarters in 1900.
- Kwale Game Reserve is situated in the low coastal zone of Delta State, characterized by rainforest vegetation and deltaic swamps. It is rich in reptiles and water-associated animals, particularly red river hog, sitatunga and a variety of brackish, marine and freshwater fish species.

== Sports ==
Delta State has produced several sportsmen and women, notably Stephen Okechukwu Keshi, Sunday Ogochukwu Oliseh, Austin Jay-Jay Okocha, Wilson Oruma, Efetobore Sodje Blessing Okagbare, Jonathan Akpoborie, and Ogenekaro Etebo.

== Notable people ==
- 2 Milly Star, actor and musician
- Michael Agbamuche, former attorney general and Minister for Justice of Nigeria
- Alibaba Akpobome, stand-up comedian and actor
- Venita Akpofure, British-Nigerian actress and video vixen
- Rt Rev'd John U Aruakpor, bishop, Anglican Diocese of Oleh
- Eyimofe Atake, senior advocate of Nigeria
- F.O.M. Atake, Nigerian judge (1967–1977) and senator of the Federal Republic of Nigeria (1979–1982)
- Udoka Azubuike, professional basketball player for the Utah Jazz, played at college for the University of Kansas
- Bovi, Nigerian comedian, event host, actor and skit maker
- Efe Ronald Chesterfield, Nigerian writer
- John Pepper Clark, first professor of English in Africa; poet and writer
- David Dafinone, accountant, politician
- Destalker, Nigerian comedian
- Paul Dike, former chief of Defence Staff
- Carter Efe, online streamer and comedian
- Enebeli Elebuwa, Nigerian actor
- Tony Elumelu, UBA and Heirs Holdings
- Ayiri Emami, Nigerian businessman, politician, and philanthropist
- Godwin Emefiele, present CBN governor
- Olorogun O'tega Emerhor, Nigerian financial industry leader and politician
- Erigga, Nigerian hip hop recording artist, songwriter
- Mairo Ese, Nigerian gospel singer
- Peter Etebo, Nigerian professional footballer
- Mabel Evwierhoma, professor of Theatre Arts, University of Abuja
- Jeremiah Omoto Fufeyin, founder of Christ Mercyland Deliverance Ministry
- Harrysong, Nigerian singer, songwriter and instrumentalist
- I Go Dye, born Francis Agoda, popular comedian across Africa and United Nations' Millennium Development Goals ambassador
- James Ibori, former governor of Delta State
- Alex Ibru, former minister of interior affairs and founder of The Guardian newspaper
- Cecilia Ibru, former managing director of Oceanic Bank
- Elvina Ibru, Nollywood actress
- Felix Ibru, first civilian governor of Delta State
- Goodie Ibru, businessman and hotelier
- Maiden Alex Ibru, media executive
- Michael Ibru, pioneer industrialist
- Oskar Ibru, business magnate
- Ogaga Ifowodo, lawyer and human rights activist
- Cornelius Adam Igbudu (1914–1981), founder of the Anglican Adam Preaching Society
- Dumebi Iyamah, owner of Andrea Iyamah brand
- Don Jazzy, Nigerian singer and producer
- Richard Jibunor, gridiron football player
- Wellington Jighere, Scrabble player
- Gift Johnbull, senior special assistant to the president on Community Engagement (South South)
- Ibe Kachikwu, former Minister of State, Petroleum Resources, Nigeria
- Stephen Keshi, Nigerian ex-defender, former head coach of the Super Eagles
- Festus Keyamo, Nigerian lawyer, senior advocate of Nigeria SAN
- Lynxxx, recording artist, entrepreneur, first Nigerian Pepsi brand ambassador
- Senator James Manager, Nigerian politician at the senate level
- Rosaline Meurer, Gambian-born Nigerian actress
- Richard Mofe-Damijo, Nigerian veteran actor, writer, producer, and lawyer, former commissioner for Culture and Tourism in Delta State
- Collins Nweke, first non-Belgian born person elected to political office in West Flanders Belgium
- Nduka Obaigbena, founder, ThisDay and AriseTV
- Sam Obi, ex-speaker and former acting governor of Delta State
- Sheriff Oborevwori, governor, Delta State
- Divine Oduduru, Nigerian sprinter and athlete
- Sunny Ofehe, international human and environmental rights activist
- Kenneth Ogba, politician
- Timothy Ogene, writer and lecturer at Harvard University
- General Alexander Ogomudia, former chief of Defense Staff (CDS) and former chief of Army Staff (COAS)
- Joy Ogwu, former permanent representative of Nigeria to the United Nations
- Tanure Ojaide, professor of English; writer
- Mandy Ojugbana, musician
- Blessing Okagbare, athlete, Olympic and World Athletics Championships medalist in the long jump, and a world medallist in the 200 metres
- Okocha, former Super Eagles captain
- Ngozi Okonjo-Iweala, economist and international development expert, boards of Standard Chartered Bank, Twitter, Global Alliance for Vaccines and Immunization, and the African Risk Capacity
- Chris Okotie, Nigerian musician, televangelist, politician
- Ifeanyi Okowa, former governor of Delta State
- Ben Okri, writer, Nigerian poet and novelist
- Sunday Oliseh, football manager and former player
- Omawumi, Nigerian singer, songwriter, actress; brand ambassador for Globacom, Konga, Malta Guinness
- Ovie Omo-Agege, Nigerian lawyer, politician
- Dominic Oneya, retired brigadier general in the Nigerian Army, former chairman of the Nigeria Football Association
- Rachel Oniga, Nigerian film actress
- Bruce Onobrakpeya, 2006 UNESCO Living Human Treasure Award, trustee of Western Niger Delta University
- Gamaliel Onosode, Nigerian technocrat, administrator, former presidential candidate
- Orezi, singer, songwriter
- Ayo Oritsejafor, founder of Word of Life Bible Church
- Stephen Oru, Nigerian politician, former Minister of Niger Delta Affairs
- Peter Godsday Orubebe, politician, ex-Minister of State for Niger Delta Affairs, ex-Minister of Special Duties
- Dennis Osadebay, Nigerian politician, lawyer, poet, journalist
- Prof Onigu Otite, sociologist and anthropologist
- Kingsley Otuaro, former deputy governor of Delta State
- Jim Ovia, Nigerian businessman, founder of Zenith Bank
- Tim Owhefere, Nigerian politician
- Amaju Pinnick, president of the Nigeria Football Federation
- Alfred Rewane, businessman and NADECO financier
- Igho Sanomi, Nigerian businessman
- SHiiKANE, Nigerian Afro-pop, pop, Afrobeat, jazz, dance, R&B music group
- Zulu Sofola, first published female Nigerian playwright and dramatist, first female professor of Theater Arts in Africa
- Ojo Taiye, Nigerian poet, winner of the Kingdoms in the Wild 2019 Annual Poetry Prize
- Tompolo, former Nigerian militant commander
- Abel Ubeku, first black managing director of Guinness Nigeria Plc
- Patrick Utomi, Nigerian professor of political economy and management expert, fellow of the Institute of Management Consultants of Nigeria, former presidential candidate
- Prince Tega Wanogho, American football player
- Faithia Williams, Nigerian actress, filmmaker, producer and director.
