= Awah =

Town in Delta State, Nigeria

Coordinates: 5.525°N 6.385°E

Awah, or Avba, is a town in Delta State, Nigeria. Located on the shores of the Ase River in the Ndokwa East Local Government Area, it is one of the Isoko speaking communities found in the Old Aboh political division. Until the creation of Delta State in 1991, it was formerly with the Ndoshimili Local Government Area with headquarters located in Kwale, in the defunct Bendel state.

Awah is the oldest of the communities that make up the Ibrede clan. The name Awah was derived from Awvenfor which literally means "Let us rest". Oral history has it that the first inhabitants of Awah migrated from Otor-Iyede in the present-day Isoko North Local Government Area of Delta State, Nigeria. The current location was the place where the group of immigrants who left Otor-Iyede during the uprising in Otor-Iyede rested but majority of the immigrants later went their separate ways leaving Igwoma and a few others behind. It is pertinent to add that the founders of Ibrede, Iyede-Ame and Lagos Iyede, left Awah in search of greener pastures. Awah is also popularly called Otor-Ewho.

The town Awah shares a common boundary with Ofagbe, Ibrede, Iyede-Ame, Lagos-Iyede, Ogege, Ewho-Okorafor, Anyama, Iyowo and Onogboko.

The town has two major families which are Igwoma and Okwoye. The community operates both traditional institution and politico-administrative government with the highest leadership authority in the town as the Odio Ologbo while the politico-administrative government is headed by the president general and the belief system of the people is a combination of traditional worship and Christian practices. The main economic activities of the town is agriculture ranging from cassava production, plantain, yam, starch, palm oil, fish, timber etc. The town has a primary school run by the state government and the named Uzobe after the quarter where the first immigrants of the town came from. The school was opened in 1955.

== Bibliography ==
- S.U., Omu.(2004).Unity Among Isoko People, Leadership Perspective; The Way Forward. Second National Convention of Isoko Association of North America Inc.
- Ikime, O.(1972)The Isoko People.
- "Isoko in Nigeria". Joshua Project. Retrieved 14 February 2019.
- The Isoko Tribe, James W. Welch JSTOR 1155529
- Welch, James W. (1934). "The Isoko Tribe". Africa: Journal of the International African Institute. 7 (2): 160–173. JSTOR 1155529
- Isoko traditional rulers want peace in Ibrede - The Nigerian Voice Oct 21, 2017 https://www.thenigerianvoice.com/news/258825/isoko-traditional-rulers-want-peace-in-ibrede.html.
