= Onogboko =

Onogbokor is an Isoko-speaking town in the Ndokwa East Local Government Area (LGA), Delta State, Nigeria. Until the creation of Delta State in 1991, it was formerly with the Ndoshimili LGA with headquarters located in Kwale, in the defunct Bendel state. It shares common boundaries with Iyede-Ame in the south, Igeh to the east, Umuolu and Itebiege to the north and Akara-etiti on the west. The town has three quarters: Ushie, Ogbe-ekpako and Ove. Inhabitants of the town dominantly speak the Isoko dialect with few migrant Ụkwụànì speakers. They intermarry Ụkwụànìs, Ijaws and other tribes. As a clan, it has four communities: Ewo-Okpe community, Okporo community, Ewo-eboy community and Obere community (named after a lake that has its tributary from the Niger River). There are migrants from neighbouring nearby communities and pockets of Ijaw fishermen and Hausa petty traders in the clan.

Oral history has it that Onogbokor's founder Edo migrated from Okpe-Isoko and first settled near a lake called Onogbokor some 15 kilometers from the town's current location. After losing his first son to drowning, he relocated to the present location and named it after the lake. The lake is a major source of fish and other aquatic resources for the town's people.

The town can be accessed from Ofagbe or Ibrede by an asphalt road. There is a ferry on the Ase Creek in Ewho-Okarafor by which vehicles can cross, during the dry season, and speedboat and local engine boats through Umuolu from the River Niger during high tide. It can also be accessed through an untarred earth road from Aboh, the Ndokwa-East Local Government Headquarters. The livelihood activities of people are fishing and farming, petty trading and lately timber logging.

== See also ==
- Onogboko Clan
