= 83rd (County of Dublin) Regiment of Foot =

- Active: 1793–1881
- Country: Kingdom of Great Britain (1793–1800); United Kingdom of Great Britain and Ireland (1801–1881)
- Branch: British Army
- Type: Line Infantry
- Garrison/HQ: Victoria Barracks, Belfast
- Nickname: Fitch's Grenadiers
- Battle honours: Cape of Good Hope, 1806; Talavera; Busaco; Ciudad Rodrigo; Badajoz; Salamanca; Vittoria; Nivelle; Orthez; Toulouse; Peninsula; Central India.

The 83rd (County of Dublin) Regiment of Foot was a British Army line infantry regiment, which was formed in Ireland in 1793 for service in the French Revolutionary Wars. The regiment served in the West Indies, South Africa and the Peninsular War, and after the end of the wars with France spent much of the nineteenth century in colonial garrisons. Among other service, the 83rd fought in the Ceylon Great Rebellion of 1817–18, the Canadian Rebellions of 1837, and the Indian Rebellion of 1857. Under the Childers Reforms, the regiment amalgamated with the 86th (Royal County Down) Regiment of Foot to form the Royal Irish Rifles in 1881.

== History ==
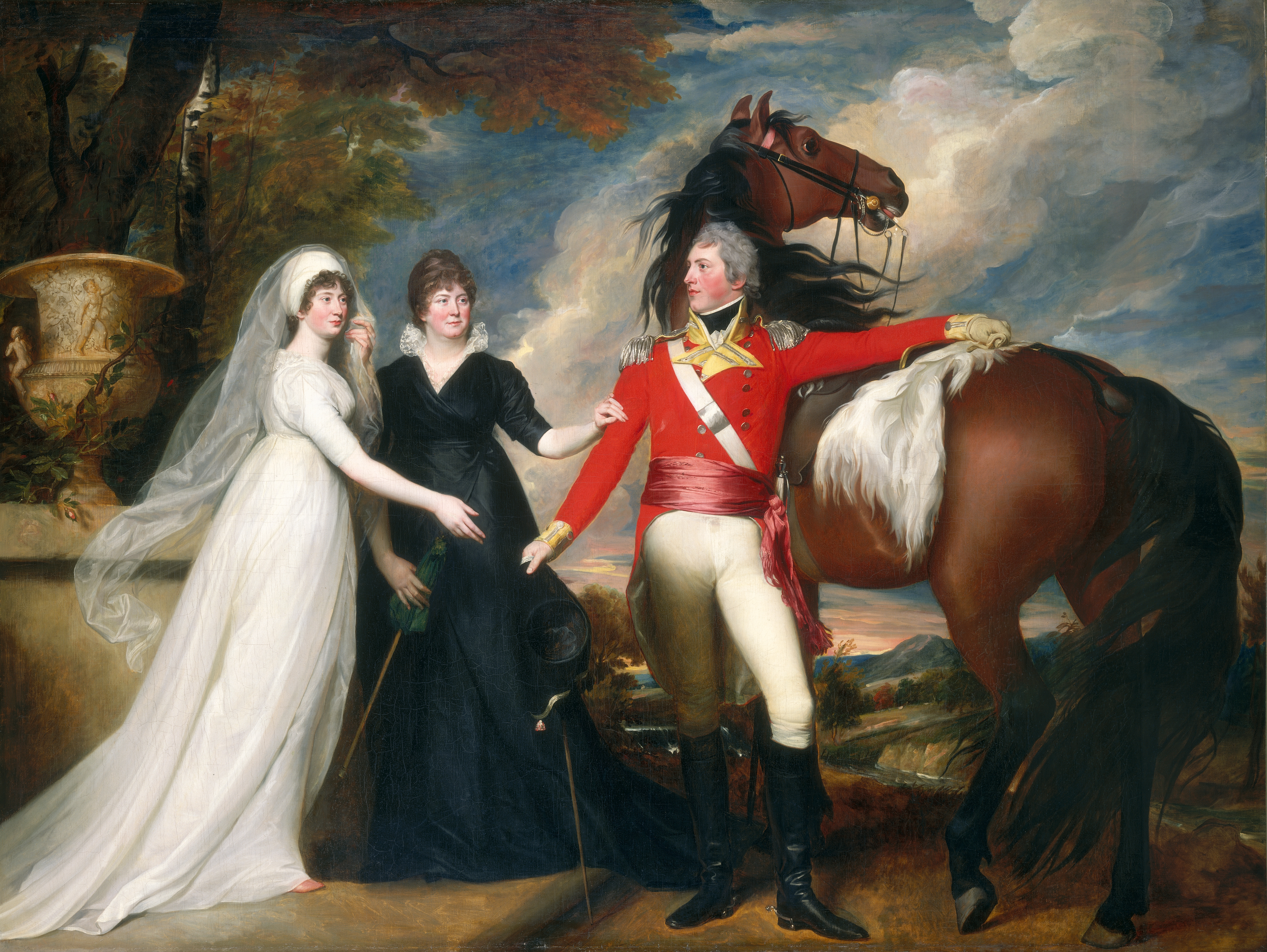
Colonel William Fitch and His Sisters by John Singleton Copley, 1801

The regiment was raised in Dublin by Major William Fitch as the 83rd Regiment of Foot, in response to the threat posed by the French Revolution, on 28 September 1793. The regiment was quartered in the newly completed Custom House while it formed, and at the end of the year was assigned to serve as part of the regular garrison in Dublin in the Royal Barracks. A second battalion was raised in October 1794, but was quickly separated to become the 134th (Loyal Limerick) Regiment of Foot.

At its formation, the regiment wore scarlet uniforms - the traditional red coats of line infantry - with yellow facings. The regiment did not have any formal title - the Dublin name would not be added for many years - but was nicknamed "Fitch's Grenadiers", due to the small size of many of its recruits.

=== West Indies and South Africa ===
The regiment sailed for England, and in mid-1795 was sent overseas to the West Indies, where half of the regiment fought in the Second Maroon War on Jamaica for eight months. Among the seventy dead from the campaign was Lieutenant-Colonel Fitch, who was succeeded in the colonelcy of the regiment by Major-General James Balfour. The other half of the regiment was sent to garrison Santo Domingo, where it took heavy losses through disease; the remnant of this detachment returned to rejoin the main body in Jamaica in 1798. The regiment remained on garrison duty until 1802, when it was ordered back to England. Most of the remaining men were drafted to other garrison units - mostly the 60th and 85th Foot - before departure. During these seven years, around 900 officers and men had died, almost all from disease, from an original strength of around 1100. No battle honours were awarded for the regiment's service in the West Indies, though the 83rd was one of a number of infantry regiments to apply unsuccessfully for a "West Indies" honour to be awarded for the overall campaign.

The regiment spent a few months in England, rebuilding its strength, and then garrisoned Jersey during 1803–1805; in 1804 a second battalion was raised in Sussex, drawing a large number of men from the 3rd Royal Lancashire Militia.

In 1805, the 1st Battalion of the 83rd was assigned to a force sent to capture the Dutch colony at the Cape of Good Hope, and saw service at the Battle of Blaauwberg in 1806, for which it was awarded the battle honour Cape of Good Hope. It would remain as a garrison there for the next decade, until 1817, receiving occasional drafts from the 2nd Battalion.

=== Peninsular War ===
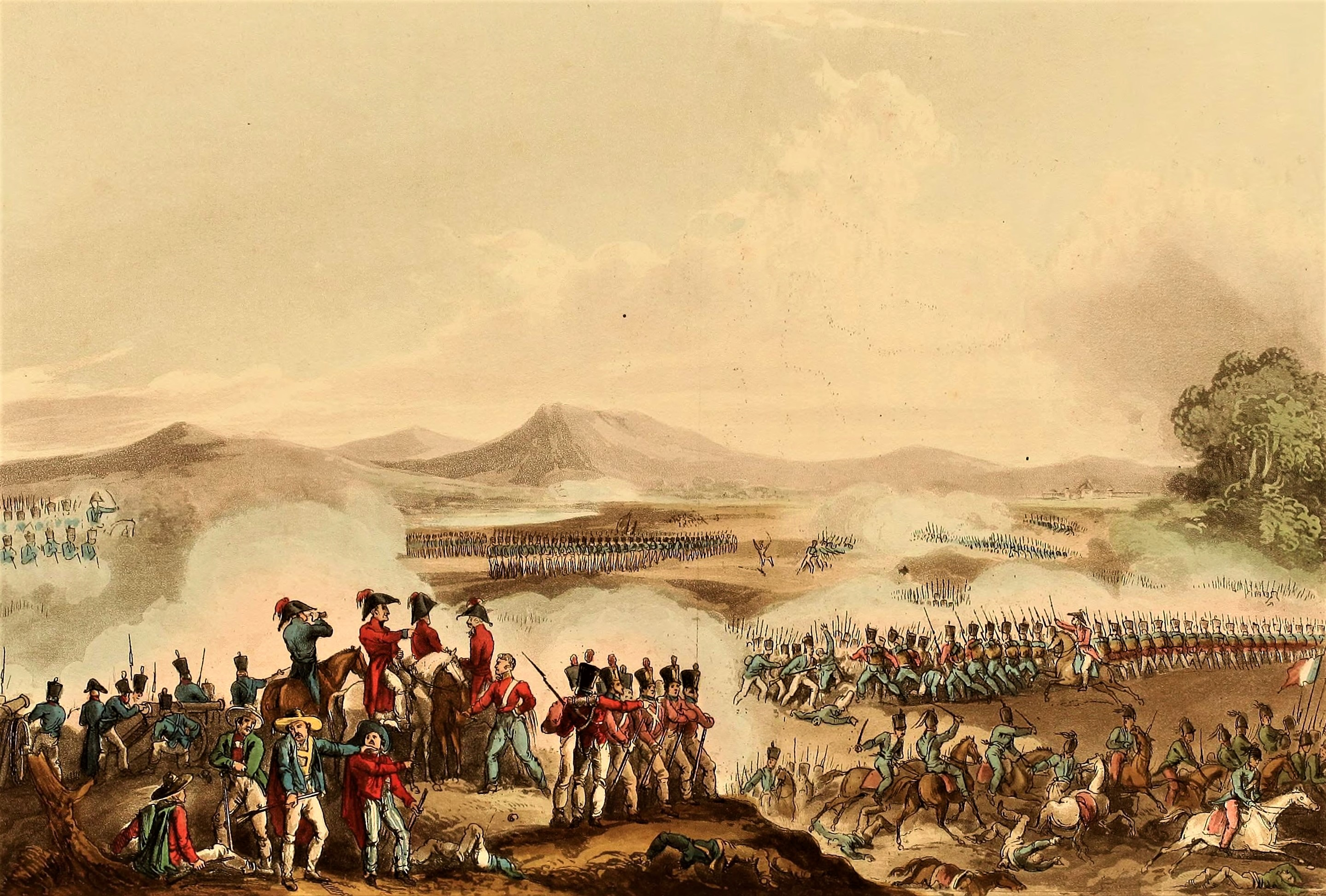
The Battle of Talavera, July 1809, where the regiment suffered heavy casualties

The 2nd Battalion remained on home service until 1809, with garrison postings in England, Jersey, and Ireland. In 1808 it was raised to an establishment of 1000 men, rather than the lower home service establishment of 600, and in early 1809 was ordered to sail for A Coruña, in Spain, for service in the Peninsular War. It was recalled while at sea following the Battle of Corunna, and then sailed successfully for Lisbon, arriving safely in Portugal on 6 April 1809. It was put under the command of Brigadier Alan Cameron, alongside the 1st Battalion of the 9th Foot.

The battalion advanced north into Portugal with the main force of the army, whose first objective was the recapture of Porto. In the Second Battle of Porto, the light company of the Buffs (Royal East Kent Regiment) crossed the river by boat and captured the seminary, a strategically located building, along with troops from Rowland Hill, 1st Viscount Hill's Brigade. while the main force entered the town from a different direction. The defenders were surprised while withdrawing, and took heavy casualties. The force pursued the French army into Spain, with the 83rd's brigade engaging and routing the French rear-guard at Salamonde on the 16th before breaking off the pursuit. The force then was garrisoned along the Tagus River, where it suffered heavily from illness spreading among the men.

On 27 and 28 July, the army was deployed at the Battle of Talavera, where the 83rd formed part of the central division; despite being exposed to heavy fire from French artillery, it held its position until the French infantry had approached to around thirty metres, and then made a bayonet charge to scatter the attackers. The battalion's casualties were very heavy, with seventy men killed including the commander, Lieutenant-Colonel Gordon, and another 295 wounded, and the 83rd was withdrawn to Lisbon to rest and receive reinforcements. It was later awarded the battle honour Talavera for its part in the battle.

The battalion spent October 1809 to September 1810 in Lisbon, when it rejoined the army as part of the left brigade in Picton's 3rd Division. It arrived in time for the Battle of Bussaco on 26/27 September, where it was only lightly engaged but still received the battle honour Busaco, and retreated along with the army to Torres Vedras, where it spent the winter.

The army advanced out of the fortress in March, and the 83rd was involved in a number of the skirmishes fought with the retreating French army through the spring of 1811. In May, it fought at the Battle of Fuentes d'Onor, where its defence of the village was mentioned in Wellington's despatches, and the regiment was awarded Fuentes d'Onor as a battle honour. It was then deployed at the siege of Badajoz and the siege of Ciudad Rodrigo, where on 25 September it helped drive off a large French relief force. The siege of Ciudad Rodrigo ended when the fortress was stormed on 19 January 1812. The light company of the 83rd led the attack on the right flank, while the main body of the battalion provided covering fire for the central attack. The battalion lost four dead and fourteen wounded, and was awarded the battle honour Ciudad Rodrigo.

The army then returned to besiege Badajoz, where the 3rd Division successfully stormed the fortress in early April. The 83rd played a major role in the attack on La Picurina, an outpost of the fortress, on 25 March, and in the main assault on 6 April. On the 6th, they led the division's attack, scaling the walls of the castle and securing the gates against a French counter-attack, but at the cost of a third of the force involved (40 killed, 87 wounded). The officers leading the attack were promoted, and the regiment was awarded the battle honour Badajoz. Through the summer of 1812, the British army advanced into Spain, fighting a major engagement at the Battle of Salamanca on 22 July; here, the 83rd's division counterattacked a large body of French troops spread out in marching order, capturing three thousand prisoners. The regiment was awarded the battle honour Salamanca.

In the following year's campaign, the battalion saw service at the Battle of Vittoria, on 23 June 1813, where it led the 3rd Division's crossing of the River Zadara. The 83rd saw heavy fighting, with 35 dead and 78 wounded; after the battle, medals were awarded to two senior officers, the regiment was awarded the battle honour Vittoria, and the commander of the 83rd's brigade personally gave a one-guinea bounty to a large number of men as a mark of their bravery. Following the battle, the battalion briefly served at the siege of Pamplona before being assigned to secure the flank of the army, where it was lightly engaged on 27 & 28 July.

Following the French defeats at San Sebastien and Pamplona, the British army advanced into France in late 1813. The first major fighting after crossing the border was the Battle of Nivelle on 10 November, where the 83rd received the battle honour Nivelle for its services and . It later saw service during the passage of the Gave d'Oloron and at the Battle of Orthez on 27 February 1814. At Orthez, the battalion lost 11 killed and 39 wounded. After the fighting, it received the formal thanks of Colonel Keane, commanding the brigade, and the battle honour Orthez; the commander of the light company, Captain Elliott, received a brevet promotion and a medal for his services. The advance continued through the following months, with the 83rd fighting at Vic-en-Bigorre, on 19 March, where it lost 7 killed and 18 wounded. The final battle of the campaign was the Battle of Toulouse on 10 April; the 83rd was only lightly involved in the fighting, but was nonetheless awarded the battle honour of Toulouse.

After the close of hostilities, the 2nd Battalion was garrisoned in France until 1 June, when it left Bordeaux to return to England. It was then sent to Ireland in July 1814, with the depot rejoining them in November. The battalion transferred to Dublin in 1815, when all officers on active service were sent to join the 1st Battalion in South Africa, and then moved to detached duty in Armagh through 1816. It was finally disbanded in April 1817, with around 390 men posted to join the 1st Battalion, then under orders for garrison duty in Ceylon. 186 men were discharged, mostly wounded and unfit for further service.

=== Ceylon ===
In October 1817, the regiment, now reduced to a single battalion, was ordered from the Cape of Good Hope to Ceylon (now Sri Lanka) for garrison duty. While they were in transit, the Third Kandyan War broke out, and on arrival the 83rd was sent directly into the hills for active service. Over the year and a half of active duty, the regiment lost only twelve men to combat, but 121 to disease and illness; a further 91 died from long-term effects over the following year. The regiment was also reduced progressively in size, to 750 men in 1818, and under 650 in 1822.

In early 1824 the 83rd was ordered to return to England, but after the Anglo-Burmese War broke out in March this order was cancelled, and it remained in Ceylon, though with an increased establishment of 850 men. Finally, in December 1825, it sailed for England; over the nine years in Ceylon, over five hundred men had died of illness. It arrived in England in May 1826, over twenty years since the original 1st Battalion had left for South Africa. Shortly after its arrival, the commanding officer retired, and was succeeded by Henry Dundas MP, a line officer in the regiment.

=== Canada ===
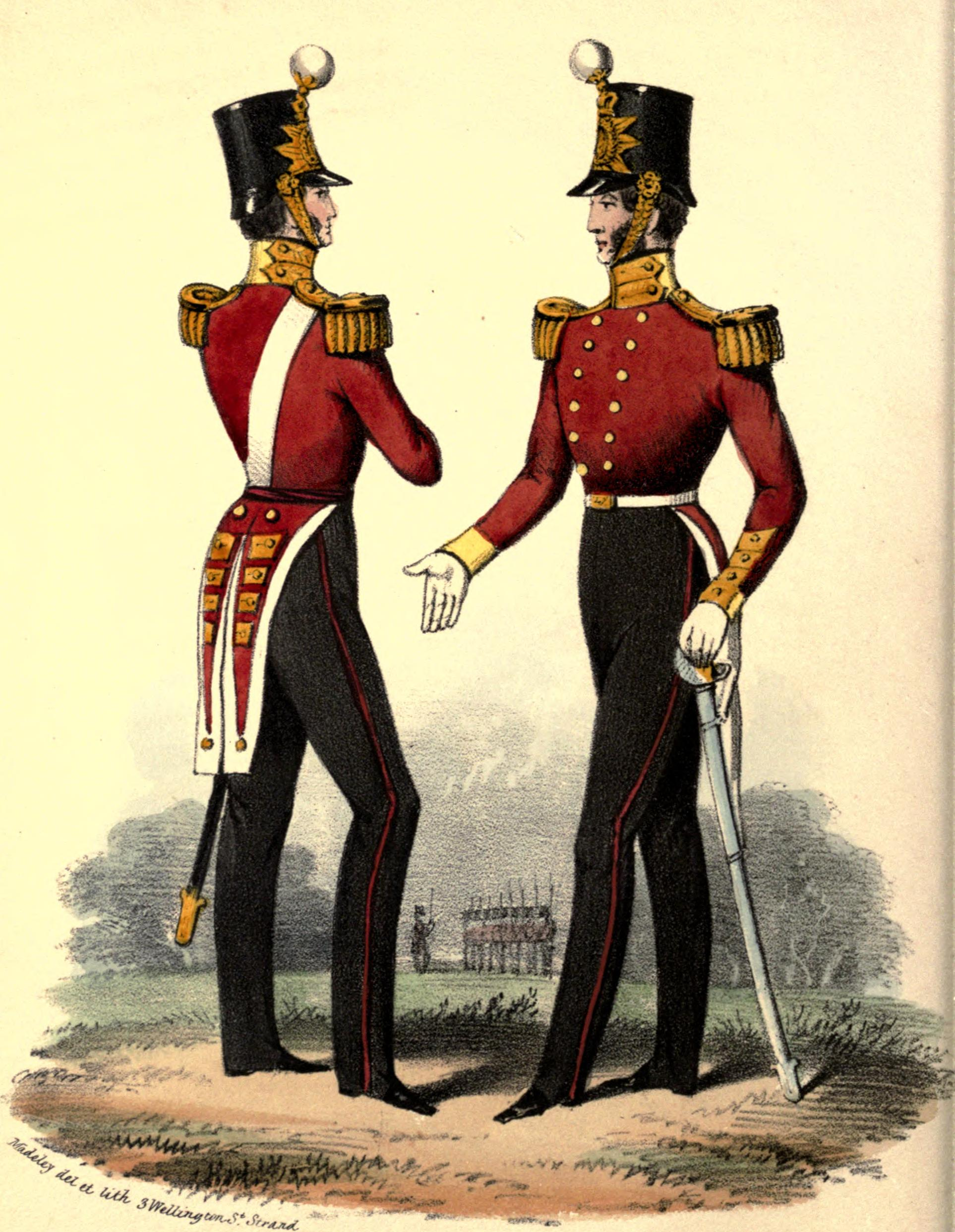
This illustration shows an officer of the 16th Foot circa 1845; the 83rd would have had a visually very similar uniform, with yellow cuffs and facings.

After a year in Glasgow, the regiment returned to Ireland, where it was dispersed among a number of stations for several years. In the winter of 1833–34, it concentrated in Dublin, and in February 1834 was ordered to Canada. Here, it garrisoned Halifax, with detachments on some outlying islands. In June 1837, following political unrest in Lower Canada, it moved to Quebec, and in December to Montreal. They arrived here two days before the Battle of Saint-Eustache, where they were one of three government regiments engaged in defeating the Patriote militia.

Two companies were detached for service in Upper Canada, one of which saw action in February at the Battle of Windsor, a skirmish close to the American border against rebel militia. It fought again a week later at the Battle of Pelee Island, in early March. Both actions were successful. In May, the main body of the regiment moved to Kingston, Upper Canada. In November, a detachment of the regiment, patrolling aboard HMS Experiment on Lake Erie, intercepted a Patriot force near Prescott, and besieged them in a windmill while awaiting reinforcements. The resulting Battle of the Windmill was the 83rd's last major engagement in Canada, with one man killed in action, and effectively ended the "Patriot War". The regiment remained in Canada until 1843, when it was ordered home.

The regiment arrived in England in July 1843, and was dispersed to stations throughout the Midlands and Yorkshire for two years, followed by stations around Ireland for a further three years, with a period spent at Richmond Barracks in Dublin. In December 1848 it was reinforced for foreign service, to a total strength of 1131 officers and men, and sailed for India in the spring of 1849. Since arriving in England, the regiment had been rearmed with percussion muskets, and had had a new colonel, Major-General Sir Frederick Stovin.

=== India ===
After arrival in India, the 83rd was split into two wings, stationed at Poona, Kurrachee, Hyderabad, and Bombay. The regiment reunited at Camp Deesa in Gujarat in January 1856. In May 1857, the regiment was alerted for active service after reports of mutinies among Indian units in Bengal and northern India. The bulk of the regiment was marched to Nusseerabad in June and July, with companies at Ajmere, Neemuch, and Ahraedabad, as well as a small group of invalids, with women and children, at Mount Aboo. The headquarters remained at Deesa. During August, detachments of the 83rd disarmed Indian soldiers from the 12th Regiment Native Infantry at Nusseerabad, and fought briefly with a squadron from the mutinying 2nd Bombay Light Cavalry at Neemuch. The invalid force at Mount Aboo was also attacked by a group of men from the Jodphur Legion.

In September, the detachments began pushing outwards to restore British control. The force at Ajmere was reinforced by a second company as well as local forces including a troop of the Bombay Horse Artillery, and advanced towards Awah. They were met by heavy resistance, and fell back after an unsuccessful attack on 18 September. The force at Neemuch later attacked the village of Nimbhera (captured on 20 September) and the fort at Jeerun (occupied and demolished 24 October), before being themselves besieged by Indian troops. The siege lasted fifteen days, 9–23 November, before the garrison was relieved by a force sent from Mhow.

Through November and December the regiment concentrated at Nusseerabad, and after the headquarters had arrived from Deesa, it moved to attack the fortress at Awah. The siege began on 19 January 1858, and the fortress was abandoned on the night of the 23rd; the defences were destroyed. The regiment then joined the two brigades assembled to attack Kotah; the siege lasted 22–30 March, when the city was captured by three columns, one led by the 83rd. The regiment returned to Nusseerabad at the end of the month, where it was re-equipped with new Enfield rifles.

In June and July a large portion of the regiment was sent to protect Jaipur and Tonk from rebel forces retreating from Gwalior, with battles fought at Sanganer on 8 August and Kotharia on the Banas River on 14 August. A similar detachment was sent east again in January and February 1859, fighting at Seekur and Koshana, during the close of the campaign. The regiment was awarded the battle honour Central India for its services in India, and officers and men who had served in the field in Rajputana were awarded the Indian Mutiny Medal as well as six months batta (pay and allowance). In late 1859, it was granted the "County of Dublin" title, formalising its traditional relationship with the city.

=== Garrison service ===
In 1860 the regiment moved to Belgaum, in southern India, and returned to England in early 1862. It remained here for four years, in various stations, and was briefly called out due to rioting around the 1865 general election. In 1866 it moved to Ireland, where it was re-equipped with Snider-Enfield rifles, and in 1867 was sent to Gibraltar. From here, in 1870, it returned to India, initially stationed at Pune and then at Deesa and Karachi.

As part of the Cardwell Reforms of the 1870s, where single-battalion regiments were linked together to share a single depot and recruiting district in the United Kingdom, the 83rd was linked with the 86th (Royal County Down) Regiment of Foot, and assigned to district no. 63 at Victoria Barracks, Belfast. The 83rd began to prepare to return to Britain in late 1880, drafting volunteers who wished to remain in India to other units. The order was countermanded in January 1881, however, three weeks before the scheduled sailing date, and the regiment was sent instead to South Africa for service in the First Boer War. It sailed on HMS Crocodile and arrived in the theatre in March, where it was employed on rear-area labouring duties.

=== Amalgamation ===
In July 1881, as part of the Childers reforms, the regiment was amalgamated with the 86th Foot to form the Royal Irish Rifles. The 83rd, as the senior regiment, became the 1st Battalion of the new regiment. While the new regiment retained an Irish identity, the link with Dublin was broken, and the depot remained at the 86th's home in Belfast, where it was linked with militia units drawn from County Down, County Antrim, and County Louth.

The Royal Irish Rifles would go on to serve in the Boer War and First World War, after which their name was changed to the Royal Ulster Rifles. Following Irish independence in 1922, the regiment was retained in the British Army, and served in the Second World War and Korean War. It was reduced to a single battalion after the war, and amalgamated with the other two Northern Irish regiments into the Royal Irish Rangers (27th (Inniskilling), 83rd and 87th) in 1968. The Rangers were then merged with the home-service Ulster Defence Regiment in 1992 to form the Royal Irish Regiment, itself since reduced to a single battalion.

== Battle honours ==
Battle honours won by the regiment were:

- Cape of Good Hope 1806
- Peninsular War: Talavera, Busaco, Fuentes d'Onor, Ciudad Rodrigo, Badajoz, Salamanca, Vittoria, Nivelle, Orthes, Toulouse, Peninsula
- Central India

== Colonels of the Regiment ==
Colonels of the Regiment were:

=== William Fitch's Regiment of Foot ===
- 1793–1795: Lieut.-Col. William Fitch [killed 1795 in Maroon war] (Lieutenant Colonel Commandant)

=== 83rd Regiment of Foot - (1795?) ===
- 1795–1823: Gen. James Balfour
- 1823–1835: Gen. John Hodgson
- 1835–1848: Gen. Hastings Fraser, CB
- 1848–1865: Gen. Sir Frederick Stovin, GCB, KCMG

=== 83rd (County of Dublin) Regiment of Foot - (1859) ===
- 1865–1873: Gen. Edward Pery Buckley
- 1873–1881: Gen. William Gustavus Brown
