= Asaba-Assay =

Asaba Ase
- Community
- Location in Nigeria f
- Coordinates: 5°21′52.23″N 6°23′42.48″E
- Country: Nigeria
- State: Delta State
- Climate: Aw

Asaba-Ase (also Asaba-Eseh) is a community in Ase Town, Nigeria in Ndokwa East Local Government Area of Nigeria Delta State. It derives its name from the Ase river. It is situated a few kilometres away from the petroleum producing community of Uzere in Isoko South, and approximately six kilometres away from Abari, an Ijaw settlement in the Patani local government area of Delta State. Asaba-Ase is one of the Ukwuani settlement in Ndokwa East affected by 2012 flood The native language of the people is Ukwuani Language.

== Etymology ==
Asaba-Assay is derived from the words, "Asaba on the lower Ase River ."

== History ==
It is asserted that the initial occupants of the area migrated southwards from Asaba, a town on the lower Niger towards the Ase River and intermarried with the Ase people in Ase Town, thus resulting in the title as "Asaba-Assay" which is "Asaba on the lower Ase River."

== Difficulties ==
Asaba-Assay is situated on a flood basin which is almost always flooded, this results to a large population of mosquitoes and other insects thus making life difficult. The access road into and out of the area is prone to be washed away by recurring floods and there is nowhere an individual can pass through Asaba-Assay to get to. The poverty is high and there's absence of social amenities that makes life comfortable.

== Economy ==
Fishing is the main occupation of the natives. The Asaba-Assay market is also a meeting point between buyers from different places and sellers from various places.
