= Iyede-Ame =

Iyede-Ame, ("watery Iyede") derived its name from Iyede, an upland town in Isoko South Local Government Area in Delta State, Nigeria.

Oral legend has it that the first inhabitants of Iyede-Ame migrated from Iyede mentioned above. A riverine community situated in Ndokwa East Local Government Area is one of the Isoko speaking towns found in the Old Aboh political division.

The town Iyede-Ame is bordered by Onogboko, Igeh, Ivrogbo, Akara-etiti, Utue and LagosIyede-Ame, an adjunct community. The town has two major quarters, Ushie and Ogbodogbo with several other adjoining communes. The highest leadership authority in the town is the president who chairs the National Working Committee (NWC) that oversees the general development of the town. Power is well decentralized down to community general chairman as well as quarter chairmen who maintain law and order in the community.

People of the town are migrants from Iyede, Ofagbe and several other places with few Ukwuani settlers who are mixed up through intermarriages.

The mainstay economic activity of the town is agriculture ranging from cassava production, plantain, yam, ozi, palm oil, fish, timber etc. The town has a community high school with the named Iyede-Ame Secondary School- formerly Iyede-Ame Grammar School, opened in 1980. There is also an elementary school, Orewo Primary School, named after a fertility deity of the community.

== Sources ==
- S.U., Omu.(2004).Unity Among Isoko People, Leadership Perspective; The Way Forward. Second National

Convention of Isoko Association of North America Inc.

- Ikime, O.(1972)The Isoko People.
