= Ase, Nigeria =

Town off River Niger, Nigeria

Ase Ase (Eseh)
- Town
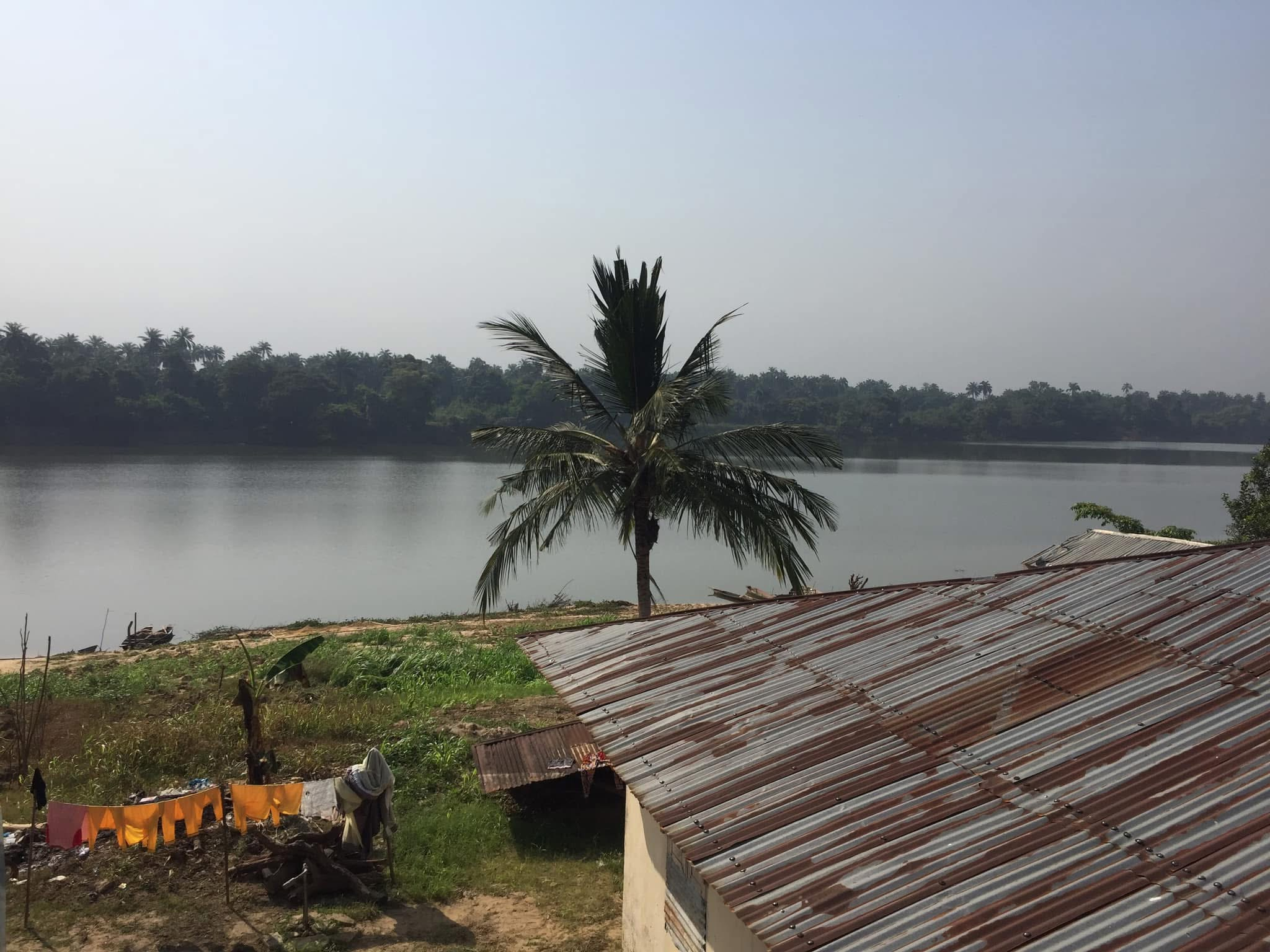
- Natural beach in Ase, Delta State, Nigeria

- Location within Nigeria
- Coordinates: 5°20′35″N 6°20′03″E
- Country: Nigeria
- State: Delta State
- LGA: Ndokwa East

Government
  - Igwe: HRH Igwe Ifeanyichukwu Peter Ogeh I (current)
- Time zone: UTC+1 (WAT)

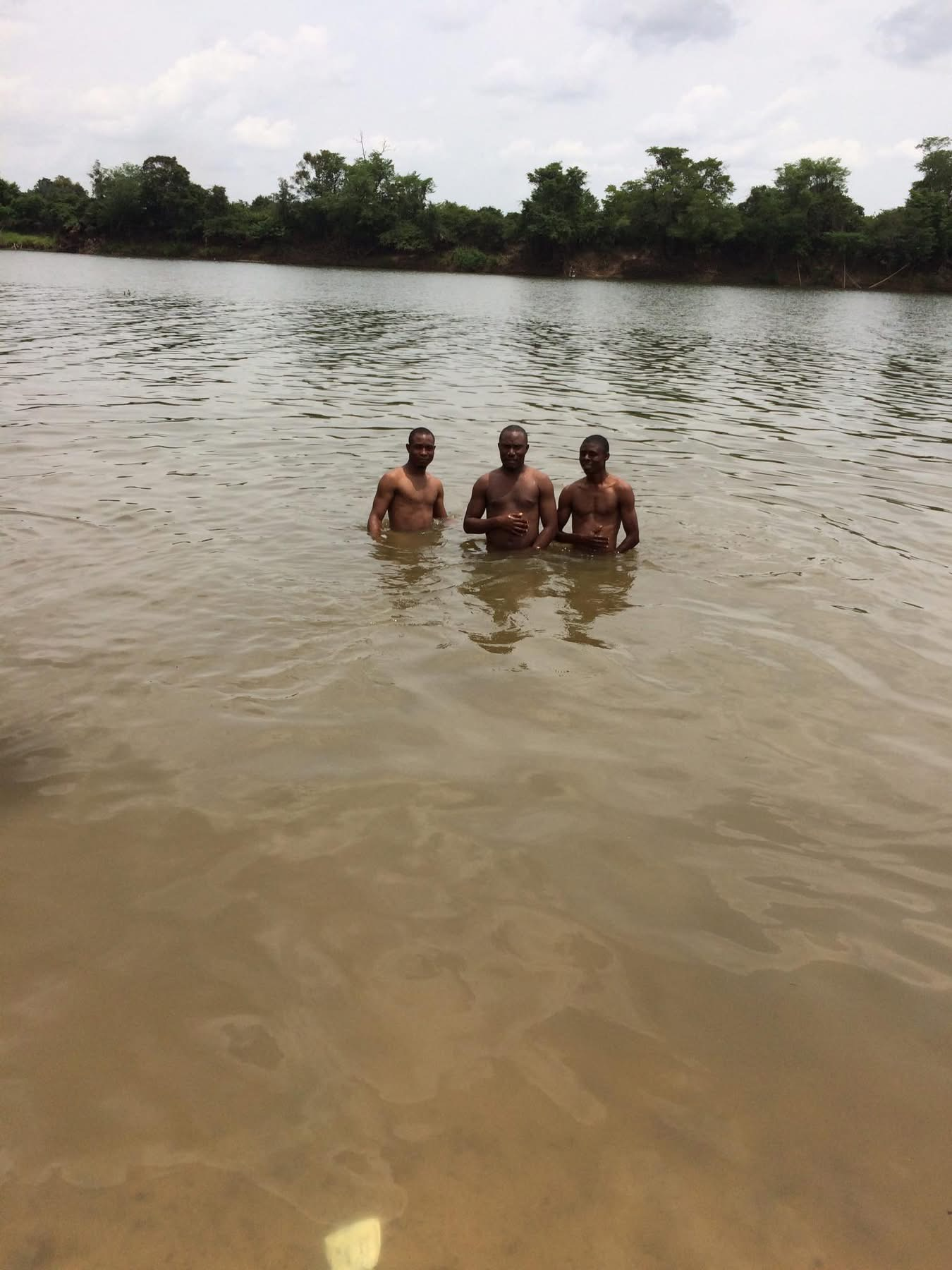
People swimming in Ase River

Ase (pronounced Eseh) is a coastal community on the shores of the Ase River, off River Niger in Ndokwa East Local Government Area of Delta State, Nigeria. Ase River derives its name from Ase town. Ase is an idyllic countryside with a spectacular and breathtaking natural beach, evergreen rain-forest vegetation rich in flora and fauna which overhangs the Ase Creek. Ase is a serene natural tourist resort still waiting to be explored. Ase shares common boundaries with Ibedeni, Onyah, Aviara, Uzere, Patani (all in Delta State) and Trofani (in Bayelsa State).During the colonial era, Ase served as the commercial and administrative Headquarters for the colonial administrators. Relics of colonial presence still dot the landscape. John Holt and UAC are some of the companies that had trade offices and warehouses in Ase. The town is an Ukwuani town with people who have intermarried with the Isokos and Ijaws over the years. The Ase Language is of the Ukwuani language, and Isoko Language as their secondary language. The Ase people are of the same ancestral origin with Ase-Azaga, Ase-Imoniteh, and Ase-Omuku. Among the other Ases, Ase town is generally referred to as Ase Ebeneze (founder of Ase) or Ase Ukwu (big Ase).

== History ==
Ase was founded by Ebeneze. During the colonial era, Ase served as the commercial and administrative headquarters for the colonial administrators. Relics of colonial presence, such as buildings from John Holt and the United Africa Company (UAC), still dot the landscape. The town is an Ukwuani settlement with people who have intermarried with the Isokos and Ijaws over the years.

== Geography ==
Ase (pronounced Eseh) is a coastal community on the shores of the Ase River, off the River Niger in Ndokwa East Local Government Area of Delta State, Nigeria. It is an idyllic countryside with a spectacular natural beach, evergreen rain-forest vegetation rich in flora and fauna which overhangs the Ase Creek. The town shares boundaries with Ibedeni, Onyah, Aviara, Uzere, Patani (all in Delta State) and Trofani (in Bayelsa State).

== Government ==
The traditional ruler of Ase is the Igwe. The current ruler is HRH Igwe Ifeanyichukwu Peter Ogeh I.

== Origin ==
The aboriginal Ase people like most communities in present Delta North are of Kingdom of Aboh origin and the native language of the people is Ukwuani.

== Politics and government ==
Ase town was founded by Ebeneze and its ruler is the Igwe (the current Igwe is HRH Ifeanyichukwu Peter Ogeh I) who is duly recognised and gazetted as a traditional ruler in Nigeria by the Delta State Government. He is the custodian of the customs and traditions of Ase people. The monarch is influential in Ndokwaland and is a member of the local government and state council of traditional rulers. The Umu-Ogwezi Royal Family (comprising Umu-Onyaa, Umu-Onwuka, and Umu-Ozegbe) of Umuonotu Quarter is the only royal ruling house in Ase Clan. Ogwezi is Ebeneze's first male child. The Igwe governs with a council of chiefs (Igwe-in-council) comprising the Ejeh of Ogbonome Quarters, the Aguenya of Echei Quarter, the Onowu of Ekukeni Quarter, the Ocheonor Igwe of Egbeme Quarter. There are several other palace chiefs that constitute the Igwe-in-Council. Some past Igwes of Ase Kingdom include: Igwe Onwuakaegba, Igwe Ugbomeh Igoni, Igwe Enebeli, Igwe Oguru, Igwe Ayori, among others.

== Festivals ==
The main festivals of Ase community are Oje, Eze-Nmo, Ogbo-Oyibo, Orikpor, Erishi, Nmawu. They are kinds of masquerades performances and each masquerade is individualised by the peculiarity of its repertoire of accessories and costume. Some of these festivals are celebrated annually.

=== Culture and Tradition ===
Ase town is rich in African culture and tradition. Some notable age-grade groups and titles in the community include: Otu-Eze, Otu-Osugba, Okwa Ogbe (Quarter Chief), Okwa (Community Chief), and Igbu. Ase is rich in cultural dance. Some traditional dance groups in the community include: Egwu-Amala, Egwu-Adukor, and Egwu-Igba. From time immemorial, Ase people hold in esteem the art of story-telling, a tradition which enabled them to pass from generation to generation, their oral history.

== Education ==
Ase town has two primary schools (Ebeneze Primary School and Idume-Eze Primary School), and a secondary or high school (Ase Grammar School). There are other primary schools in Ase Clan such as Egbeme Primary School, Ogboko Primary School, etc.

== Government Amenities ==
There is a police station, a maternity/dispensary, and a completed but yet to be equipped cottage hospital. Its natural gift of having both deep and shallow waters, slow flowing and fast flowing waters and situated at the confluence of River Niger and Ase River makes the community the ideal location for an institute of marine and fresh water research in Nigeria.

== Accessibility ==
The town is accessible by water and land. There is an asphalted road network from Oleh through Aviara, Araya, Edherie to Ase. It is also accessible by water through River Niger to Ase River.

== Economy ==
Ase people are predominantly engaged in farming and fishing at subsistence and a little bit of commercial level. The town has enormous agricultural potential with alluvial deposits by the bank of the Ase River and River Niger. With a bit of agricultural extension service, the community could become a major food producing belt. The town is reputed for the famous Ase yam which is harvested seasonally. Plantain, Pepper, Garden Eggs, Cassava, Sweet Potato are some of the crops grown in the area. The community is believed to have enormous deposits of petroleum resources. The exploration of crude oil in neighbouring communities has lent credence to this belief. The use of horizontal drilling techniques may have made it easy for oil companies to access oil deposits in Ase territory without commensurate benefits to the community.

== Impact of 2012 Flood ==
Ase town like all coastal communities in Delta State was completely submerged by the great flood in 2012, and the impact was terribly devastating. Properties and farm produce worth several millions of Naira were completely destroyed. Ase town did not benefit from government flood intervention fund and flood relief materials. Ase Grammar School (the community's only secondary or high school) was severely damaged, the school is under repair by a group named AAG (Ase Action Group) who has all it members as Ase indigenes.
