= List of Aboh rulers =

The Obi of Aboh is the traditional ruler of the Aboh Kingdom founded in 1650, by Obi Essumei Ukwu. The monarchy is an elective one, which rotates around the royal houses of Umu Ossai, Umu Ozegbe, Umu Ojugbali and Umu Ogwezi.

Following the colonization of modern-day Nigeria by the British Empire, its monarchs were still able to retain their roles as traditional rulers, with their political power removed, and replaced by the British Southern Nigeria Protectorate, and later by the government of Nigeria.

The following list of Aboh monarchs was arranged by the Ndanike, Ijoma Essumei, a royal title of the Aboh kingdom. The time period of the reigns of the first 4 Aboh monarchs were not able to be accurately ascertained, so a period could not be determined.

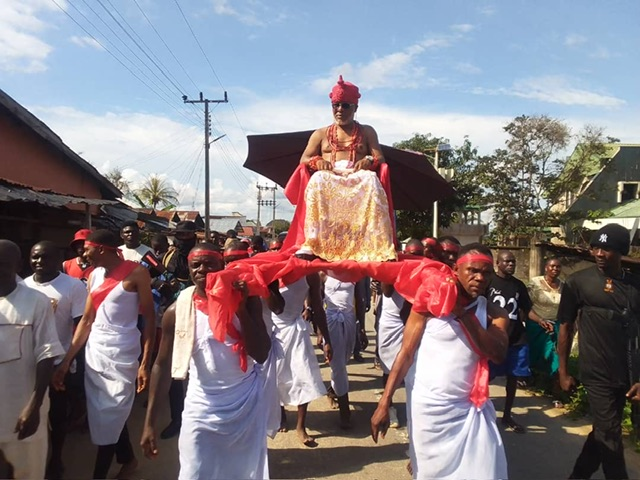
HIM Obi of Aboh, Dr. Gregory Nnamdi Oputa

== List of the Obis of Aboh ==
Obi's of Aboh	Start	End	Notes
Essumei Ukwu	1650	?	Founder of the kingdom of Aboh.
Ozegbe	?	?	Extremely cruel and savage king, who was killed in a trap by his chiefs.
Opia	?	?	Known as "Eze Obi Omiko", i.e. the "kindly king".
Chiegwe	?	?	Introduced the "gwala gwala" fruit to Aboh.
Ugbo	1735	1750s	Said to have had a brief and troubled reign.
Ogwezi	1735	1750s	Known as the "Father of Aboh". Ousted Ugbo from power.
Ojugbali I	1750s	1775	A civil war in Aboh took place during his reign, between the Umudei and the Ndichie, with the latter emerging victorious, leading to the creation of new Umudei titles to avoid domination such as:"Okwa Ossai ukwu,and Okwa umu."
Okeye	1770's	1780's	Devoted his reign to the development of Aboh's naval power, and opened trade with the Ata of Igala, allowing Aboh traders within his territory.
Enebeli	1790's	1805	The expansion of Aboh's territory began under his reign, by defeating the raiding Ijos attacking the surrounding villages. For protection, the towns had to acknowledge Enebeli as their sovereign, becoming vassals to Aboh.
Imaga	1805	1820	Renowned for being handsome, with his name being used to compliment comely men.
Ugboma	1820	1820	Reigned for only 8 months.
Ossai I	1826	1844	Most powerful monarch in Aboh's history, known as “Obi Ossai ukwu” meaning “Ossai the Great”. Oral history details him as an extremely militaristic ruler and various European sources document the extent of Aboh's territory under his rule. Never again did Aboh reach such heights after his death, with many towns relieved of tributary status after his death, and due to the ensuing interregnum.
Olisa	1862	1865	The Obi of Aboh after the near 2 decade interregnum, and is remembered in Aboh as "Olisa mgbi ogwu", i.e. "Olisa the great warrior".
Ojugbali II	1870s	1880s	Became the Obi at an old age, and did not reign long. Aboh traditions say several wars were fought during his reign, including the Aboh-Anam War. Uncertainty of the duration of his reign, due to another interregnum after Olisa's death.
Imegwu	1880	1886	Described as an intensely independent monarch, and frequently at war with neighbouring towns to bring them under Aboh. Signed several treaties with the French and British, which deprived him of his authority. Last ruler of Aboh before British colonization.
Post-Colonization of Nigeria, under the Southern Nigeria Protectorate
Ossai II	1907	1910	
Oputa II	1916	1964	
Imegwu II	1971	2023	
Oputa III	2024	-	

== Sources ==
- Ogedengbe, Kingsley Oladipo (1971). The Aboh Kingdom of the Lower Niger, c. 1650–1900 (Thesis). OCLC 34700685. ProQuest 302646798.
- Crowther, Samuel (1883). Crowther to Parents Committee. London, Church Missionary House
- Baikie, William (1856). Narrative of an exploring voyage up the rivers Kwóra and Bínue. England: London: John Murray
- Kolapo, Femi J. (2002). "Nineteenth Century Niger River Trade and the 1844-1862 Aboh Interregnum". African Economic History
