= Obetim Uno =

Obetim-Uno
- Town
- Interactive map of Obetim-Uno
- Coordinates: 6°46′1″N 7°28′1″E
- Country: Nigeria
- State: Delta State
- Local Government Area: Ndokwa East
- Postal code: 322130

Obetim-Uno is one of the towns that make up the Afor clan in Ndokwa East Local Government Area of Delta State in Nigeria. Its postal code is 322130. The closest major cities include Asaba, Onitsha, Owerri, Warri and Benin.

Obetim Uno is divided into four quarters, namely; Umu-ugbum, Umu-Osonwu, Umu-Obifi, and Umu-Oleke respectively. The town is under the leadership of an Okpala ukwu who is the oldest man in the community.
