= Aboh-Anam War =

1870 conflict in south-eastern Nigeria

Aboh-Anam war
Date	1870
Location	Southeastern Nigeria
Result	Decisive Aboh victory, treaty is reached

Belligerents
Kingdom of Aboh	Anam

Commanders and leaders
Ogwu Aje	General of Anam

Units involved
Unknown	Unknown

Following the death of Obi Ossai I, many of the towns previously subject to his rule had declared their independence, one of these including Anam, who sought to harm Aboh’s trade.

== Background ==
With the power of the Kingdom of Aboh having waned since Ossai’s death, and the ensuing chaos of the 18-year interregnum, many previously tributary towns had declared their independence from Aboh, including Nsugbe, Ossomari and Anam.

== Battle ==
Following the end of its tributary status, Anam had begun attacking Igala and Aboh traders, utilizing its naval power to disrupt the enterprise of both kingdoms, which had begun to be accepted as an occupational risk integrated in the trade.

However, by 1870, under the reign of Obi Ojugbali II, the attacks had become too intense, with the attacks having completely cut them off from trade with northern markets.

Ojugbali seeking to end the menace, sent for the Ochiagha (general) of Aboh, Ogwu Aje, to wage a war on the Anam. The latter led a massive naval force in a campaign against the Anam, who were thereby completely routed, with their general slain in a duel with Ogwu Aje.

== Aftermath ==
Following the war, the Aboh warriors took as a trophy, two large canoes which they nicknamed “Anam”, and were reported as the largest canoes they had ever seen in Aboh. The trophies were still seen in the Aboh creek by the late 1920s.

For the Anam, a treaty was reached following their crushing defeat, and it was therefore after this battle that the Anam settlements of Ifite-Anam, Umuezeanam, and Ezi-Anam were moved further inland for safety.

== Sources ==
Ogedengbe, Kingsley Oladipo (1971). The Aboh Kingdom of the Lower Niger, c. 1650–1900 (Thesis). OCLC 34700685. ProQuest 302646798.
