= Kingdom of Aboh =

Igbo(Anioma) kingdom in pre-colonial Nigeria

Kingdom of Aboh Aboh Obodo Eze
- c. 1650 - 1900
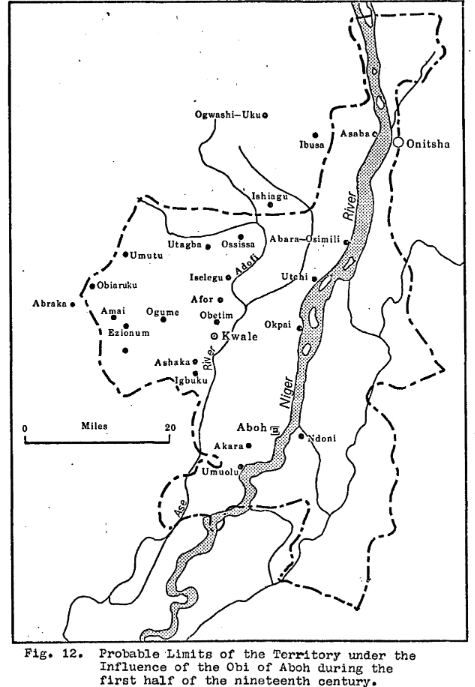
- Aboh at its territorial height
- Status: Kingdom
- Common languages: Igbo
- Religion: Odinala, Christianity
- Government: Elective Monarchy
- Obi
- Historical era: Early Modern
- Currency: Cowry shells, Manillas
Preceded by	Succeeded by
Kingdom of Benin; Nri Kingdom	Southern Nigeria Protectorate
- Today part of: Nigeria

The Aboh Kingdom, also known as the Kingdom of Abo, was a kingdom in the Niger Delta region, Nigeria. Its capital, Aboh is located in present-day Delta State, and was founded by Obi Essumei Ukwu. Due to being situated along the lower Niger River, Aboh served as a center in political and commercial matters between the 17th and 19th century. The kingdom peaked under Eze Obi Ossai, having reached its zenith under his rule, becoming a major trading power where it acted as a middleman in the trans-Atlantic slave trade and later the palm oil trade.

== History ==
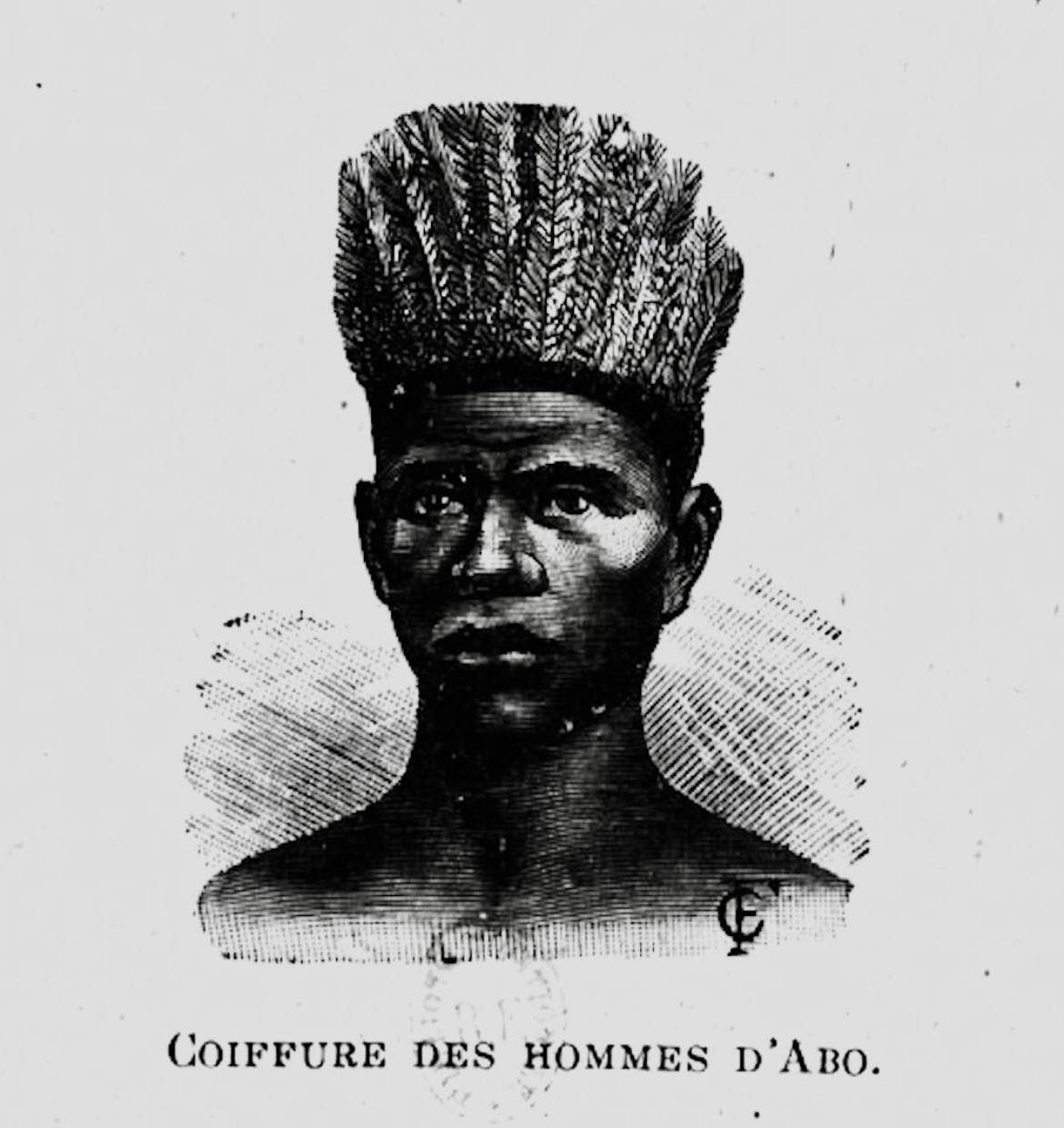
A man from Abo

The origins of Aboh, are told both in oral traditions and historical analysis by various historians. According to the oral history, Aboh trace some of its origins to a migration from the Benin Kingdom, a multi-ethnic society, which was in the midst of civil war, and shares this oral history similarities to that of Onitsha, whose own ancestors departed from Benin under their king Ezechima. Other parts of its origin draw connections with the spiritual institutions and practices of Nri, including the ozo staff of which the Obi possessed the ofo nze office staff, the Igbo religion of Odinala and the ndichie. Therefore, it is speculated that due to proximity to Benin, and its political influence on its neighbours, that the Kingdom of Aboh developed its centralized political structure, which was a rarity among its neighbours in the Niger Delta.

Aboh reached its prominence during the 18-19th century where it grew in political and military strength due to its strategic position along navigable waterways, which made it a hub of trade along the Niger Delta, and allowing it to exert influence over inland and coastal trade. During its height, the kingdom extended its authority over territories across the western half of the Niger Delta, including large sections of modern-day Delta and the riverine states of eastern Igboland, of which these towns would pay tribute to the Obi. The expansion of the kingdom's power led to kings of other groups in the Western Delta to seek favour from the Obi, in recognition of the prestige of his rulership.

Aboh Kingdom was headed by the Obi, or King, who was supported by a council of titled chiefs and elders who represented lineages and administrative units within the kingdom. Unlike most Igbo east of the Niger, Aboh was a highly centralized polity, with the institute of government being "Izu Olinzele" or, "society of titled men", with the Obi and the Oduah, the elder statesman, at the top of the hierarchy. Military strength was also a central to Aboh's dominance over trade, with its navy, consisting of war canoes, which played a critical role in its regional dominance and protection of trade routes, and from where its rivalry with the neighboring Igala Kingdom sparked, in their competition of trade.

Aboh had relations between other kingdoms along the Niger, specifically in regard to trade and warfare, but its relationship with its northern neighbour Igala were complex, involving both trade and conflict. Igala had long been the main beneficiary of the Niger River trade owing to the position of its capital Idah on the confluence of the Niger, which transformed it into a regional power, had by the 19th century been overtaken by Aboh, emerging as the foremost military and commercial power in the Lower Niger.

Aboh's influence also extended into areas under Igala control. At one point, a son of the Obi of Aboh was sent to Idah, to resolve disputes concerning Aboh traders within Igala territory. Another cooperative effort included Ossai sending messengers to inform the Attah of Igala regarding the murder of a European trader by the King of Brass, which would have led to the complete end of European inflow of goods along the Niger, leading to a joint expedition between the Atta aligned with Emir Dasaba of Nupe in a joint cavalry attack on the Brass.

Aboh was also especially proficient in the palm-oil trade, and was recognized by European traders as by far the leading market in the trade. Its monopoly on the market was to the extent that the King of Brass would bow to the Obi of Aboh in reverence and acknowledgment of the suzerainty of the Obi over his kingdom, and would sell palm-oil to Aboh for less than what he sold to the Europeans.

Interregnum

With the death of Obi Ossai in 1844, the Kingdom of Aboh began to unravel into a succession crisis between the two sons of Ossai, Aje and Chukwuma, and Olisa, a member of the royal house of Umuojugbali. Prior to his death, Obi Ossai reportedly designated Chukwuma as his successor, a move that deviated from traditional succession practices and sparked contention among the royal lineage.

Elders within the kingdom supported Aje over Chukwuma's claim, due to the belief amongst the elders that Chukwuma was of weak character compared to Aje who was renowned as warlike and a wealthy trader.

Olisa, who was also renowned as a great warrior and trader, akin to Aje, was also a contender for the throne, as a descendant of Obi Ojugbali I. In the early period of the interregna, Aje appeared to have taken an early lead in the race in attaining the Obiship, as he was in control of all foreign policy and warlike affairs, Baikie noting that he was much favored to be elected king of Aboh. Internally, the effects of this prolonged dispute over the next Obi, resulted in Aje refusing to participate in military campaigns of expansion, and externally, the lack of central power had led to many towns previously subject to Aboh ceasing to pay tribute, becoming independent.

Ajayi Crowther who visited Aboh in 1857, stated that each of the competitors for the Obiship had become “masters of their own quarters”, with both Aje and Olisa building palaces for themselves as displays of their authority.

In Aboh, 60 electors wielded considerable amount of political influence as individuals without whose support none of the contestants could ever become the Obi. The electors in some cases exerted a powerful influence, and contestants, as in the competition after the death of Obi Osai I, Aje and Olisa had incurred heavy expenses in trying to gain their support, which muddled the political scenery in Aboh. Aboh central authority during the interregnum therefore diffused among the competing princes, wealthy individuals, and elector office-holders.

Further complicating issues was that while these chiefs and electors for their own gain, could put the selection of a king on hold, they however, had no command of the force with which to back up their decision, and a powerful sectional "chief" or contestant could disregard their ruling with impunity. Eventually, the 18 year interregnum came to an end following the death of Aje in 1862, in which Olisa would be crowned the new Obi of Aboh.

== Structure ==
The political organization of Aboh was structured as an elective monarchy, with the Obi and the Oduah positioned at the head of the hierarchy and a three-tiered stratification of Umudei, Ndichie Ukwu and Ndichie Nta, who acted as council to the Obi.

At the base level, the heads of the various sub-lineages are expected to manage the affairs of the ogbe or compound under the leadership of its head known as okpala (elder).

At its higher levels, certain rigid stratifications occur. These include where the Umudei must sit at the left hand of the Obi or Oduah while the Ndichie sit on the right. These sitting arrangement are also observed during religious ceremonies.

An Umudei who was offering sacrifice would have the Umudei on his left and the ndichie on his right. An Ndichie would, also sit with the Umudei on his left and his fellow Ndichie on his right. The rigidity of these practices were also observed when the king died. As part of the rituals, his body is brought to the royal cemetery by sixteen citizens, made up of eight Ndichie and eight Umudei on either side of the coffin or akpuleke.

The Oduah who acts as a head priest is older than the other titles, including perhaps the obiship. Within the kingdom it had defined functions, and does not owe its existence to any act of appointment. In the case of the death of an Oduah, the oldest male Umudei automatically assumes office.

The Oduah's political and ritual powers are akin to the Obi, allowing the Oduah the right to “ma ekwe" or to issue announcements and assemble the Olinzele to his residence.

Decisions reached here are regarded as valid as those enacted by the Obi and his titled men. The Oduah anoints (ido nzu) and crowns (ikpume okpu) the Obi, with no king allowed to ascend the throne without these preceding rituals.

== Trade and commerce ==
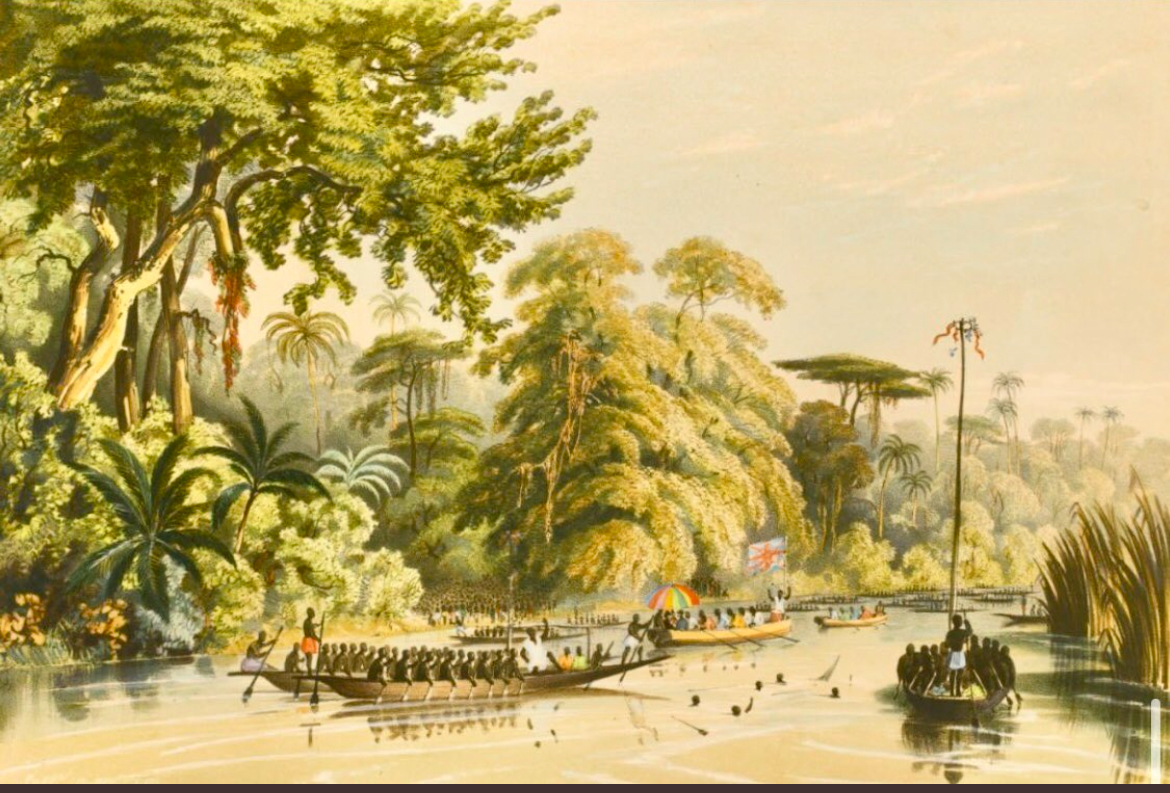
Aboh indigenes conducting trade along the Lower Niger (colorized)

Trade along the Niger River, was done so in many marketplaces, including Aboh, Onitsha, Asaba, Ossomari, and Idah. In regards to Aboh, the principal trade took place within the city's port. It particularly enjoyed a special status due to its location at the apex of the Delta, with trade flowing through it from Benin and Warri from the west, Brass from the center, and Bonny and Calabar from the east. Aboh was able to control access to the Niger trade and so acquired the appellation "Abo obuchili oshimili” meaning "Aboh the guard and defender of the Niger.”

Additionally, Aboh's trade consisted of imports by sea, including manufactured goods and cowries, as well as beads, salt, hats, muskets and gunpowder. With the external trade being dealt with in the selling of slaves initially, before adopting the palm oil trade. Local trade between the marketplaces along the Niger included trade of yams, canoes, brass, thatches for buildings and poultry. Aboh's trade with the Brass was particularly extensive, with Brass depending on its local trade with the former for sustenance, as agricultural farming could not be practiced within the swamps of the Niger Delta, Captain William Allen 1841, notes that:

The King of Brass has eighteen large canoes, with forty men in each, which he sends to Aboh for palm-oil, yams, fowls, bullocks, goats, sheep, rice and blackbeans, in exchange for which he gives rum, cowries, cloths, shirts, hats, caps, knives, looking-glasses, snuff-boxes, hooks and lines, scissors, muskets, powder and ball, tumblers, wine glasses.

Canoes and slaves were especially important in regard to Aboh commercial success, with canoes being utilized in trading bulk goods across the Niger, and consequently were in high demand, as well as the exportation of slaves, which generated great wealth for the kingdom in the 19th century.

== Military ==
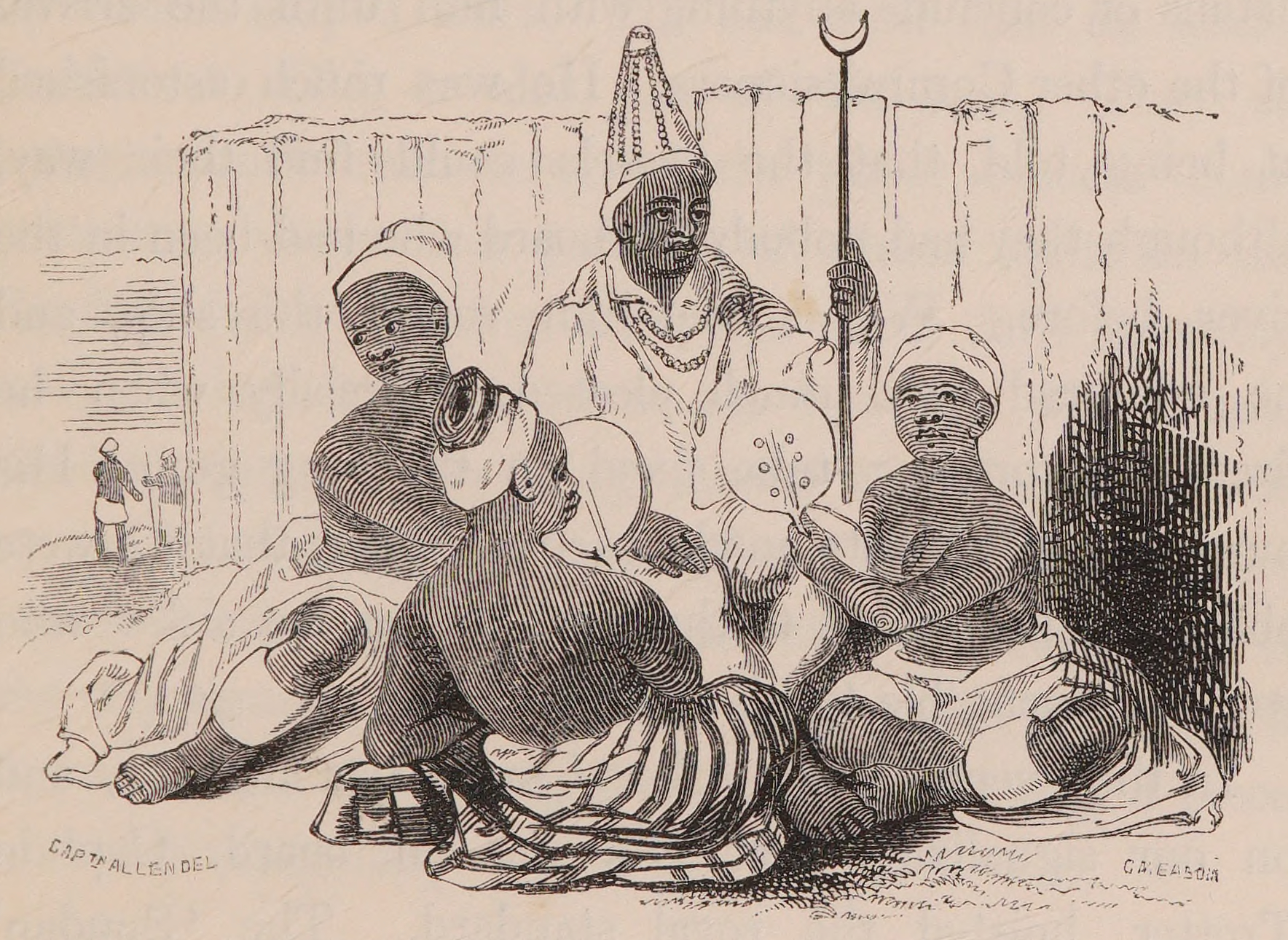
Obi Ossai, whose reign expanded the kingdom to its greatest extent

Aboh possessed the most formidable military in the Niger region during the 18th and 19th century and were feared by their neighbours. It was noted by Talbot that the Obi of Aboh was the most powerful king and was perceived by the Lander Brothers (although erroneously) that he was the king of all of [Igbo] country.

Aboh's military was based around its navy, which were centered around large fleets of war canoes. The war canoes were equipped with weapons ranging from spears and arrows to later firearms and cannons obtained through trade with European merchants. This navy allowed for Aboh to control the Niger waterways and allowed it to dominate riverine trade routes and to defend its territory against incursion from rival states or tribal raids.

Its military power reached its zenith under Obi Ossai, in which it was documented by Captain H.D. Trotter of when the king seeks to make "great war" he amasses as much as 300 war canoes, with each according to traditions confirmed by written evidence holding up to 70 men.

On an extraordinary occasion, it is said the King can muster about three hundred [war canoes], many of them armed with muskets and cannon in the bows.

Following the death of Ossai, the military might of the kingdom declined, and was greatly weakened from political fragmentation due to the then ongoing interregnum, however, despite this were still capable of resisting and defeating northern invasions, such as when the Emir of Nupe's attempted invasion was routed and the defeat of the Anam in their war.

== Decline ==
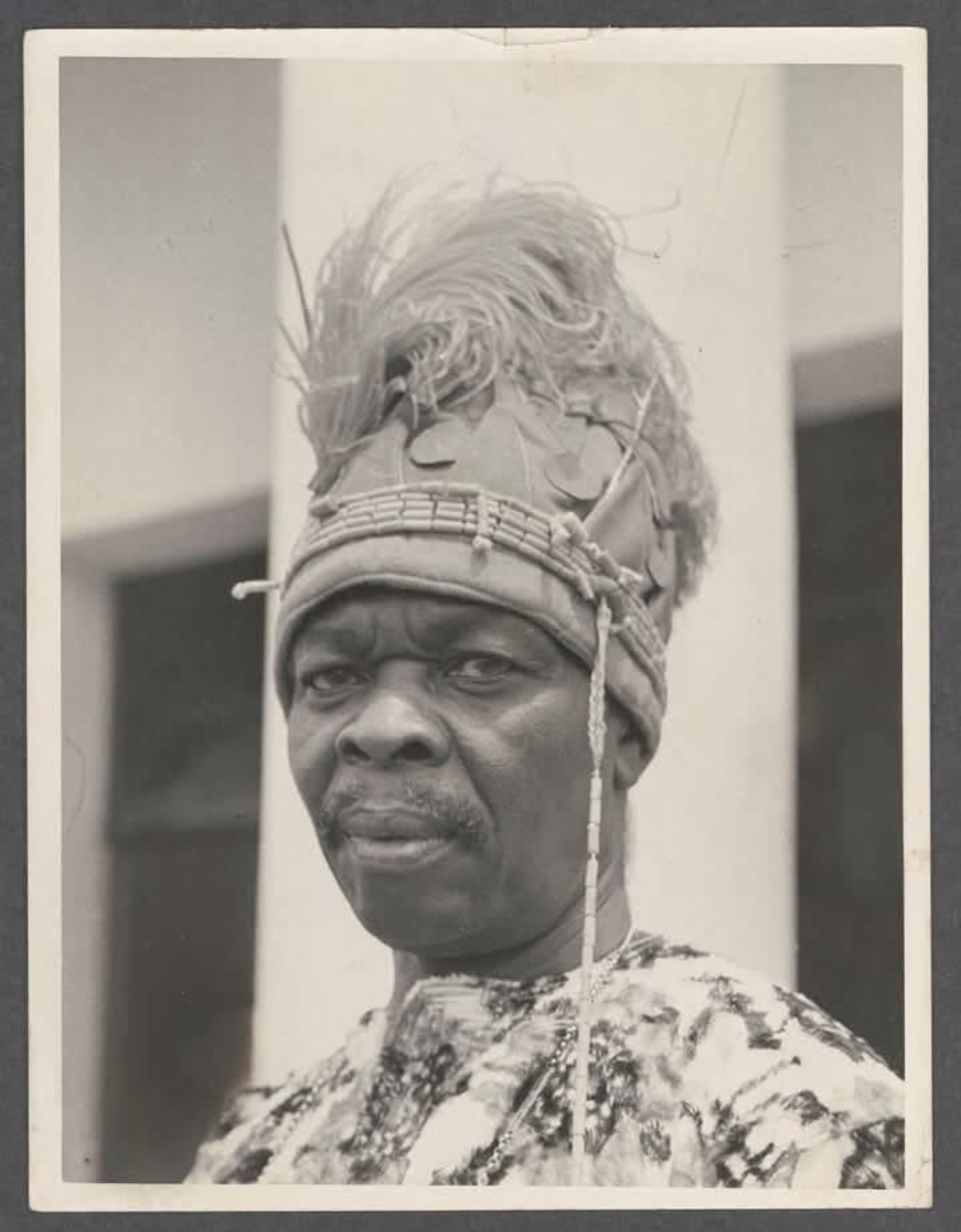
Oputa II, the Obi of Aboh post-colonization

The protracted power struggle between the retinue of the contesting parties during the 18-year interregnum, during which the kingdom lacked a centralized authority, weakened its political cohesion and diminished its influence in regional affairs.

The issues it induced had profound effects of the status of Aboh. It would eventually lead to establishments of British factories in Onitsha and Lokoja, which harmed the middleman status of the kingdom. Many towns previously tributary to the Obi, such as Ossomari became strong enough to resist once again becoming vassal states, frequent clashes with the British, including where the latter deployed warships in a battle against the kingdom resulted in devastating losses, and numerous treaties with the French and British ate away at Aboh's autonomy.

These affairs would eventually lead to the collapse of the kingdom, leading to its colonization by the British Empire.

== See also ==
List of Aboh rulers

Igbo people

Igboland

Kingdom of Nri

Kingdom of Benin

== Sources ==
- Baikie, William Balfour (1856). Narrative of an exploring voyage up the rivers Kwóra and Bínue (commonly known as the Niger and Tsádda) in 1854. London: J. Murray.
- Ogedengbe, Kingsley Oladipo (1971). The Aboh Kingdom of the Lower Niger, c. 1650–1900 (Thesis). OCLC 34700685. ProQuest 302646798.
