= Onogboko Clan =

Onogbokor Clan is a clan whose origin is traced to Okpe-Isoko Kingdom, Isoko-North LGA of Nigeria. It is governed by a traditional ruler with the title Odio-Ologbo, who hails from the royal family in Ushie quarters of the town. The first crowned Odio-Ologbo of the clan was His Royal Highness Gideon D. Akporeha (Uloho) I, who is the custodian of all political authority over the quarters and the communities. He was a well-known traditional ruler who was recognised and gazetted by the government of Delta State in 1996 and presented with a staff of office. He was a member of Delta state, Ndokwa-East, and Isoko Traditional Councils. His reign witnessed peace after a protracted legal battle for the throne. He reigned from 1996 to 2017. In 2018, a regent, the first son of Uloho I, HRM (Hon.) Gibson O. Akporeha 1, a former Vice Chairman in Ndokwa-East Local Government Area of Delta State from 1999-2003, was crowned the Odio-Ologbo of Onogbokor in accordance with the Ruling House crowning rites. He reigned from 2018-2020 as a regent and later died the same year his regency ought to have lapsed. Another lineage of the Royal Family in Ushie Quarters presented the current Odio-Ologbo, His Royal Highness, Isaac Onomeyare Ajawobu, Uloho II, who was appointed by the Delta State Governor Ifeanyichukwu Arthur Okowa on August 14, 2021, and was presented with a staff of office on April 13, 2022. The leadership of the Clan is decentralized. Each community has its own leadership structure with balanced gender representation including the youth. The clan's belief system is a combination of traditional worship and Christian practices. Apart from the usual Christian festivals of Easter and Christmas, Onogbokor Clan boasts of three main festivals celebrated annually: the Ogene festival, Ogrigri festival and the Obere-fishing festival which attracts fishermen from different parts of Delta State and other neighbouring states.

The clan has a community primary school called Otuto-ughe primary school, run by the state government, and one privately owned; children from the three communities also access these for their elementary education. The town has a postal agency, but has since been converted to a police post to serve the security needs of the clan and neighbouring towns and communities. There is also a medicine store where residents can purchase over-the-counter drugs and a local maternity/dispensary for pregnant women and primary community health needs.
