= HMS Crocodile =

Four ships of the Royal Navy have borne the name HMS Crocodile, after the large aquatic reptile, the crocodile:

- HMS Crocodile (1781) was a 24-gun sixth rate launched in 1781 and lost in 1784.
- HMS Crocodile (1806) was a 22-gun sixth rate launched in 1806 and broken up in 1816.
- HMS Crocodile (1825) was a 28-gun sixth rate launched in 1825. She was on harbour service from 1850 and was sold in 1861.
- HMS Crocodile (1867) was an iron screw troopship launched in 1867 and sold for breaking up in 1894.
