= Ase River =

River in Delta State, Nigeria

Ase River Ase Creek
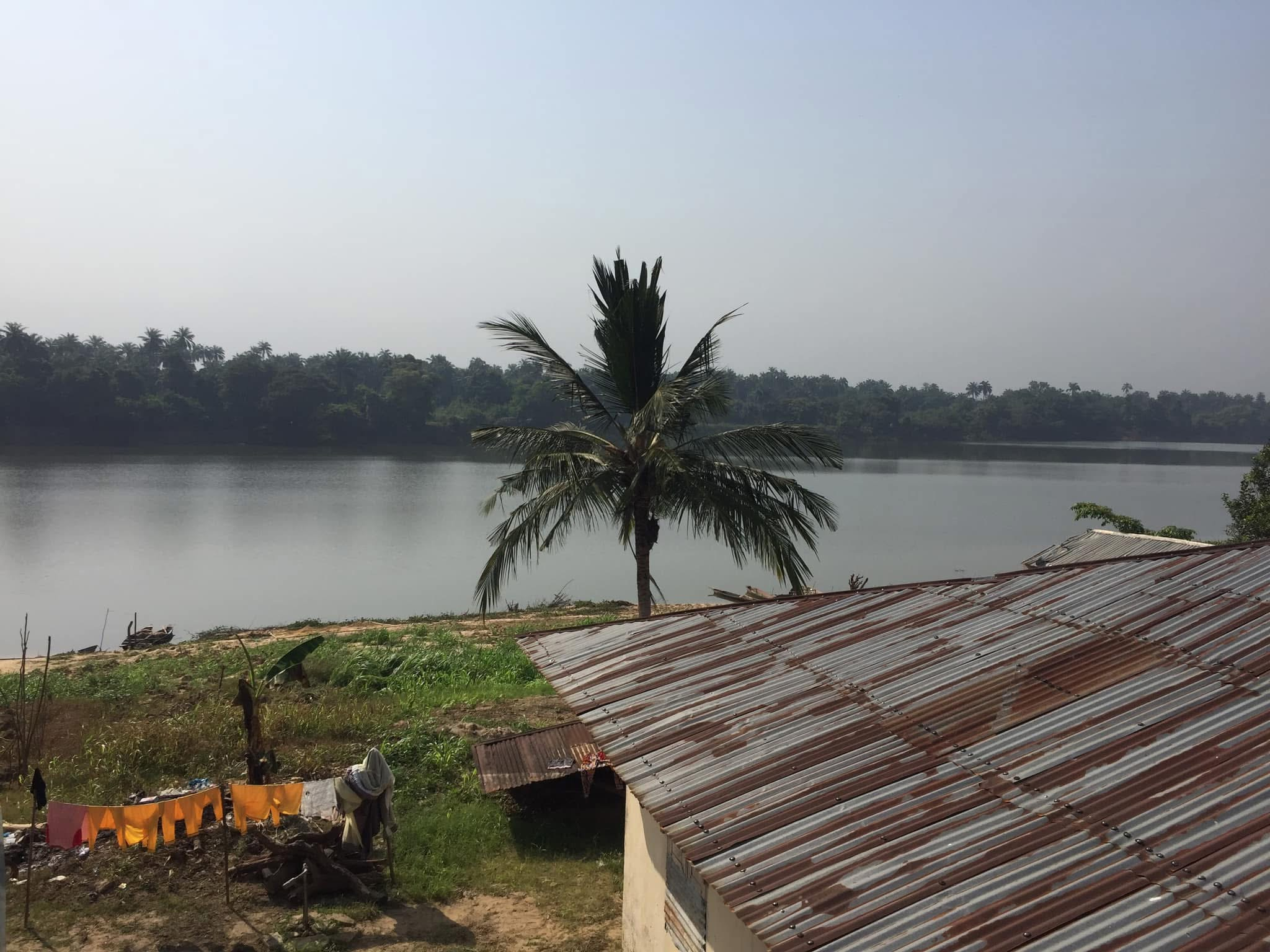
- Natural beach along the Ase River
- Nickname: Osè Ase

Location
- Country: Nigeria
- State: Delta State
- Region: Ndokwa East

Physical characteristics
- Mouth: River Niger
  - coordinates: 5°17′16″N 6°17′18″E

The Ase River (also known as Ase Creek) is a river (or creek) in Delta State, southern Nigeria. It flows through the coastal town of Ase in Ndokwa East Local Government Area and joins the River Niger.

== Geography ==
The Ase River is located in the Niger Delta region. The area features evergreen rainforest vegetation rich in flora and fauna, with a natural beach along its shores. The river and its surrounding creeks form an important part of the local waterway system.

According to Federal Surveys of Nigeria in 1970, the river is located at latitude 5°17′ 5°53′ North and longitude 6°17′ 6°31′ East.

River Ase is a tributary of the Forçados River, the western branch of River Niger in the Niger Delta. The river has its source from Lake Ewuru (6.4°N, 6.30°E) Oshimili South LGA, and its confluence is at Asaba-Ase (5.20°N, 6.7°E) in Ndokwa East, Delta State. River Ase has a length of approximately 292 kilometres, and flows through freshwater swamp and swampy forest of the Niger Delta region.

== Ecology ==
The river supports diverse aquatic life and is important for local fishing. Scientific studies have examined heavy metal concentrations in the sediments and fish species of the Ase River.

It is also a known area for studies on the transmission of schistosomiasis (urinary schistosomiasis) in the Ase-Niger River basin.

== Importance ==
The Ase River is central to the livelihood of the people of Ase, providing water for domestic use, fishing grounds, and transportation. It has significant potential as an eco-tourism destination due to its serene natural beach and rainforest setting.

== Importance ==
The river supports local fishing, transportation, and daily livelihood for the people of Ase. It has potential for eco-tourism because of its natural beach and scenic setting.
