= Ofagbe =

- Location in Nigeria
- Coordinates: 5°33′N 6°21′E
- Country: Nigeria
- State: Delta State

Ofagbe ("Ofa kugbe") is a town about 16 kilometres (9.9 mi) southeast of Ozoro, the headquarters of the Isoko North Local Government Area of Delta State, Nigeria. Legend has it that the town was established by three families who migrated from various points in the then Benin Kingdom to settle and call the town "home."

Bordered to the west by Ibrede, to the east by the Ase River, and to the south by Ovrede, the town has an estimated population of approximately 10,000.

On entering the town from the south, Oketa Grammar School sits in a parcel of land across the road. Ofagbe is home to Ofagbe Technical College (Ofatech), one of the premier technical schools in the then Midwestern State, and also home to the proposed Premiumreal University.
