= Aboh =

Aboh Obodo Eze
- Location in Nigeria
- Coordinates: 5°33′7″N 6°31′34″E
- Country: Nigeria
- State: Delta State
- LGA: Ndokwa East
- Elevation: 24 m (79 ft)
- Time zone: UTC+1 (West Africa Time)

Aboh, or Abo, is a city in Delta State of Nigeria. It is the center of the Aboh Kingdom in Ndokwa land. It is located at an elevation of about 24 m (79 ft) above sea level and is the headquarters of Ndokwa East Local Government Area in Delta State.

== Climate ==
In Aboh, the wet season is oppressive and overcast, the dry season is muggy and mostly cloudy, and it is warm year round. The month with the fewest muggy days in Aboh is January, with 18.6 days that are muggy or worse. The best time of year to visit Aboh for general outdoor tourist activities is from early December to mid January.
