= Ndokwa East =

- LGA
- Nickname: NELGA
- Interactive map of Ndokwa East
- Country: Nigeria
- State: Delta State
- Headquarters: Aboh

Area
  - Total: 1,617 km^{2} (624 sq mi)

Population (2006)
  - Total: 103,171
  - Density: 63.80/km^{2} (165.3/sq mi)
- Time zone: UTC+1 (WAT)
- Postal code: 322

Ndokwa East is a Local Government Area of Delta State, Nigeria. Its headquarters are in the town of Aboh.

It has an area of 1,617 km^{2} and a population of 103,171 at the 2006 census.

The postal code of the area is 322. The southernmost end of the area is Asaba-Assay.

== Prominent people ==
Olaudah Equiano the writer and abolitionist, was most likely born in the town of Ashaka Ndokwa East.
