= Utonlila Community =

Itsekiri community in Nigeria

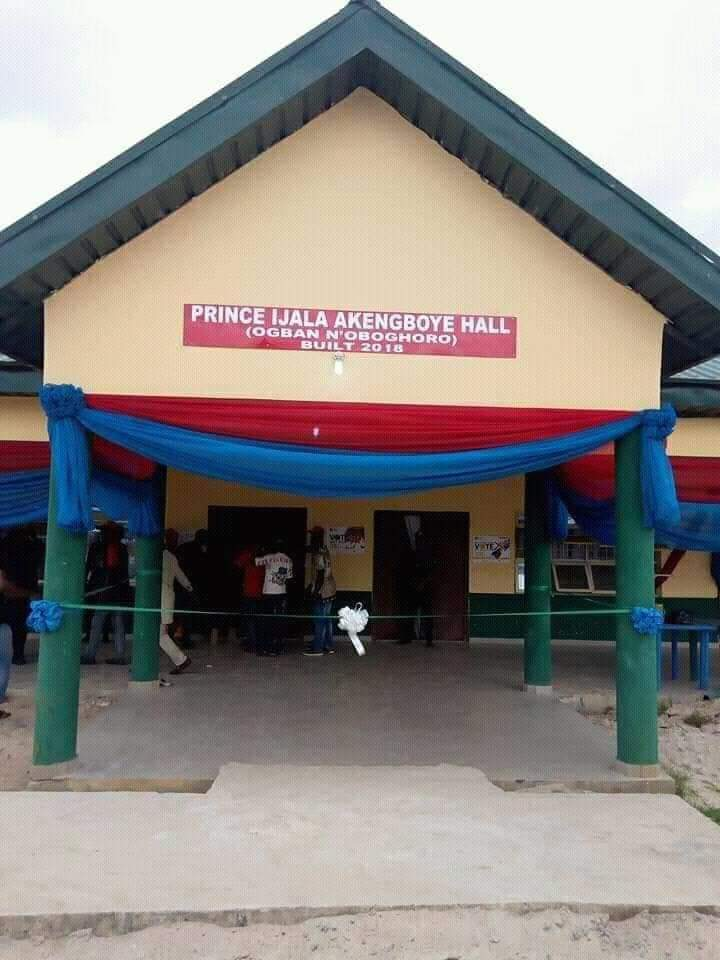

Utonlila Community is an Itsekiri community located in Warri North Local Government Area of Delta State. Utonlila is based in Nigeria. The community is a twin community with Oboghoro Community. As a result of this, they both share Odokun secondary school and the two primary schools; Ijala primary school and Edo primary school. It also uses the same jetty.

The Olu of Warri is the King of Warri Kingdom and as such, he reigns over Utonlila Community like all other communities in Warri Kingdom.

Every end of the year, the Oboghoro festival is hosted by Mr Godwin Ebosa and the Oboghoro community. This is attended by A-list artists across Nigeria with group dancers also entertaining guests over a set number of days.

== See also ==
- Warri
