= Oboghoro Community =

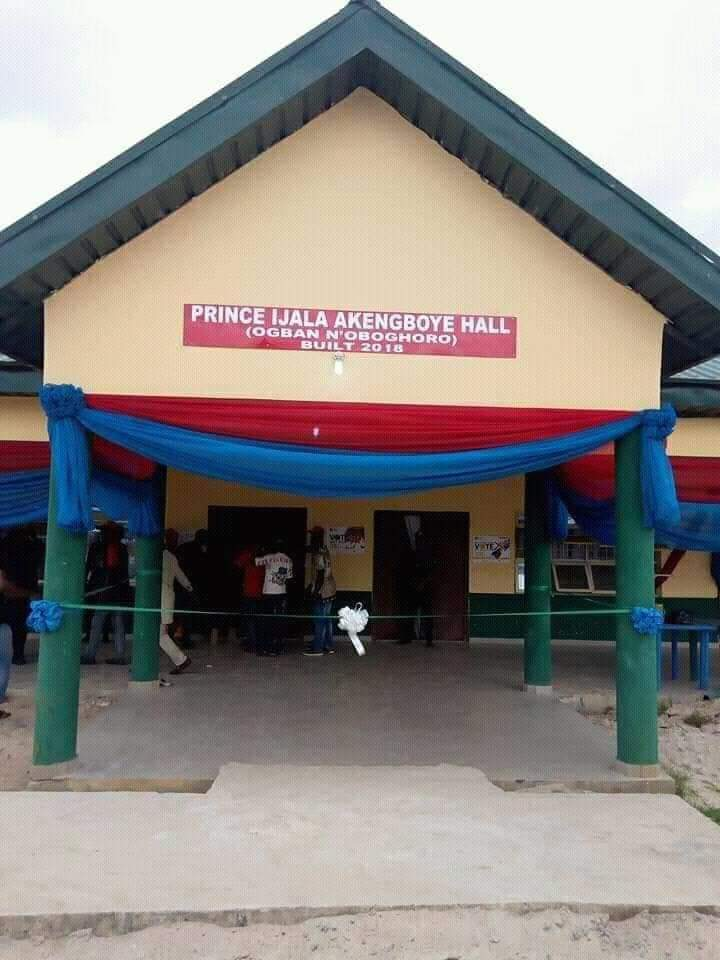

Oboghoro Community is an Itsekiri community located in Warri North Local Government Area of Delta State. Oboghoro is based in Nigeria. The community is a twin community with Utonlila Community. Odokun secondary school is the name of the secondary school in the community. It also has two primary schools; Ijala primary school and Edo primary school. It has a jetty.

Every end of the year, the Oboghoro festival is hosted by Mr Godwin Ebosa and the Oboghoro community. This is attended by A-list artists across Nigeria with group dancers also entertaining guests over a set number of days.

== See also ==
- Warri

== See also ==
- Warri
