= List of Geum species =

Geum is a genus of about 50 species of perennial herbaceous plants in the rose family, Rosaceae, subfamily Rosoideae.

== Species ==
=== A ===
Species & Synonyms	Common Names	Native Range	Illustration
Geum adnatum Wall. 1829: Sieversia adnatum G.Don	adnate sieversia	Nepal	
Geum aequilobatum K.M.Purohit & Panigrahi 1979		India	
Geum agrimonioides Pursh 1814: Potentilla arguta ssp. arguta Pursh 1814; Potentilla agrimonioides (Pursh) Farw. 1895; Drymocallis arguta (Pursh) Rydb. 1898; Drymocallis agrimonioides (Pursh) Rydb. 1908	prairie cinquefoil; sticky cinquefoil; tall cinquefoil; tall potentilla	North America	
Geum agrimonioides M.Bieb. ex Spreng. 1825			
Geum agrimonioides C.A.Mey. 1846: Geum meyerianum Rydb. 1913		North America	
Geum albarracense Pau ex Merino 1904			
Geum albarracinense Pau 1887: Geum hispidum Fr. ssp. albarracinense (Pau) Mateo 1990			
Geum album J.F.Gmel. 1791: Geum canadense Jacq. Hort. 1773			
Geum album var. flavum (Porter) 1889: Geum flavum (Porter) E.P.Bicknell 1896			
Geum aleppicum Jacq. 1786: Geum aleppicum var. bipinnatum (Batalin) F.Bolle ex Hand.-Mazz. 1933; Geum intermedium Besser ex M.Bieb. 1808; Geum potaninii Juz.; Geum strictum Aiton 1789; Geum vidalii Franch. & Sav.	Aleppo avens; yellow avens; lu bian qing	Eurasia; North America	
Geum aleppicum var. decurrens (Rydb.) W.A.Weber 1979: Geum strictum var. decurrens (Rydb.) Kearney & Peebles 1939; Geum decurrens Rydb. 1913			
Geum andicola Reiche 1898: Sieversia andicola Phil.		Chile	
Geum aurantiacum Fr. ex Scheutz 1870			

=== B ===
Species & Synonyms	Common Names	Native Range	Illustration
Geum boliviense Focke 1906		Chuquisaca, Bolivia	
Geum borisii hort. 1996: Geum coccineum Sm. 1809; Geum coccineum 'Werner Arends'; not Geum × borisii Kellerer ex Sünd.	Boris avens; Grecian rose; red avens; scarlet avens		
Geum × borisii Kellerer ex Sünd.: Geum bulgaricum × Geum reptans; not Geum borisii hort. 1996		Bulgaria	
Geum bulgaricum Pancic	Bulgarian avens	Eastern Europe	

=== C ===
Species & Synonyms	Common Names	Native Range	Illustration
Geum calthifolium Menzies ex Sm.	calthaleaf avens	Northwestern North America; Northeastern Asia	
Geum calthifolium var. nipponicum (F. Bolle) Ohwi: Geum calthifolium ssp. nipponicum (F. Bolle) Roy L. Taylor & MacBryde; Acomastylis nipponica F. Bolle			
Geum campanulatum (Greene) G.N. Jones: Geum triflorum var. campanulatum (Greene) C.L.Hitchc.	Old man's whiskers	Oregon; Washington (state)	
Geum camporum Rydberg 1913: Geum canadense var. camporum (Rydberg) Fernald & Weath. 1922			
Geum canadense Jacq.	white avens	North America	
Geum canadense Jacq. var. camporum (Rydberg) Fernald & Weath. 1922: Geum canadense Jacq. var. brevipes Fernald; Geum canadense Jacq. var. canadense; Geum canadense Jacq. var. grimesii Fernald & Weath.	white avens; Grimes' avens		
Geum canadense Jacq. var. texanum Fernald & Weath.	Texan avens	Louisiana; Oklahoma; Texas	
Geum canescens (Greene) Munz 1958: Geum triflorum var. canescens (Greene) Kartesz & Gandhi 1990			
Geum capense Thunb.			
Geum cercocarpoides DC. ex Ser.			
Geum chilense Balb. ex Lindl.		Chile	
Geum chiloense Balb. ex Ser. 1825: Geum chiloense hort.; Geum quellyon Sweet 1829		Chile	
Geum ciliatum Pursh 1814: Geum triflorum var. ciliatum (Pursh) Fassett 1928			
Geum ciliatum var. griseum (Greene) Kearney & Peebles			
Geum coccineum Lindl. 1827: Geum chilense Balb. ex Lindl.; Geum quellyon Sweet; not Geum coccineum Sm. 1809		Chile	
Geum coccineum Sm. 1809: Geum borisii hort.; not Geum coccineum Lindl. 1827	scarlet avens; dwarf orange avens; red avens	Western Asia; Southeastern Europe	
Geum cockaynei (F.Bolle) Molloy & C.J.Webb, 1994: Oncostylus cockaynei F.Bolle 1933			

=== D ===
Species & Synonyms	Common Names	Native Range	Illustration
Geum decurrens Rydberg 1913: Geum aleppicum var. decurrens (Rydberg) W.A.Weber 1979			
Geum divergens Cheeseman 1916: Oncostylus divergens (Cheeseman) F.Bolle 1933			
Geum donianum (Tratt.) Weakley & Gandhi			
Geum dryadoides DC. ex Ser.			

=== E ===
Species & Synonyms	Common Names	Native Range	Illustration
Geum elatum Wall. ex G. Don 1832: Acomastylis elata (Wall. ex G. Don) F. Bolle 1933; Sieversia elata (Wall.) Royle 1935	Yu ye hua	Asia	
Geum elatum var. humile (Royle) Hook. f.: Acomastylis elata var. humilis (Royle) F. Bolle			
Geum elatum var. humile Franch.: Coluria longifolia Maxim 1882			
Geum elatum var. leiocarpum W.E. Evans 1923: Acomastylis elata var elata (Wall. ex G. Don)			
Geum × erectum Moench: Saxifraga × geum L.			

=== F ===
Species & Synonyms	Common Names	Native Range	Illustration
Geum fauriei H. Lév.			
Geum flavum (Porter) E.P. Bicknell			
Geum fragarioides (Michx.) Smedmark			
Geum franckii Steud. 1840			

=== G ===
Species & Synonyms	Common Names	Native Range	Illustration
Geum geniculatum Michx.	bent avens	North Carolina; Tennessee	
Geum glabricaule Juz.			
Geum glaciale Adams ex Fisch. & C.A.Meyer 1809: Novosieversia glacialis (Adams ex Fisch. & C.A.Meyer) F. Bolle; Sieversia glacialis (Adams ex Fisch. & C.A.Meyer) R. Br. 1823	glacier avens	Northwestern North America; Taymyr Peninsula	
Geum gracilipes (Piper) M.Peck			

=== H ===
Species & Synonyms	Common Names	Native Range	Illustration
Geum heterocarpum Boiss. 1838: Orthurus heterocarpus (Boiss.) Juz. 1941			
Geum hirsutum Muhl. ex Link			
Geum hirsutum Muhl. 1813			
Geum hispidum Fr. 1817: G. albarracense var. rigidum Merino 1904; G. albarracinense Pau; G. ceretanum Sennen 1926; G. hispidum var. albarracinense (Pau) Cadevall & Pau; G. hispidum var. albarracinense (Pau) Cuatrec.; G. hispidum ssp. albarracinense (Pau) Sennen; G. hispidum ssp. ceretanum (Sennen) Sennen 1931; G. hispidum ssp. paui (Cadevall) Sennen; G. hispidum var. paui Cadevall; G. urbanum var. hispidum (Fr.) Wahlenb. 1824	hispid Avens	Spain, Portugal, Sweden and Latvia	
Geum hispidum ssp. albarracinense (J.F.Gmel.) Mateo			
Geum hispidum ssp. albarracinense (Pau) Mateo			

=== I ===
Species & Synonyms	Common Names	Native Range	Illustration
Geum idahoense (Piper) Smedmark			
Geum intermedium Besser ex M.Bieb. 1808: Geum aleppicum Jacq. 1786			
Geum involucratum Jussieu 1768: Geum parviflorum Comm. ex Sm.			

=== J ===
Species & Synonyms	Common Names	Native Range	Illustration
Geum japonicum Thunb.			
Geum japonicum var. fauriei Kudo: Geum fauriei H. Lév.			
Geum japonicum var. sachalinense Koidz.: Geum fauriei H. Lév.			

=== L ===
Species & Synonyms	Common Names	Native Range	Illustration
Geum laciniatum Murray	rough avens; hairy herb-bennet	Eastern North America	
Geum latilobum Somm. & Levier 1893		Georgia	
Geum lechlerianum Schltdl.		Chile	
Geum leiospermum Petrie			
Geum lobatum (Baldwin) Smedmark			

=== M ===
Species & Synonyms	Common Names	Native Range	Illustration
Geum × macranthum (Kearney ex Rydberg) S.L.Welsh 1968: Geum × macranthum (Kearney ex Rydberg) B.Boivin 1967			
Geum macrophyllum Willd. 1809	big-leaved avens; large-leaved avens; largeleaf avens	North America; Eastern Asia	
Geum macrophyllum var. perincisum (Rydberg) Raup 1931: Geum macrophyllum ssp. perincisum (Rydberg) Hultén 1946		North America	
Geum macrophyllum var. sachalinense (Koidz.) H. Hara: Geum fauriei H. Lév.		Eastern Asia	
Geum macrosepalum Ludlow 1976: Acomastylis macrosepala (Ludlow) T.T. Yu & C.L. Li 1985			
Geum magellanicum Comm. ex Pers.: Geum quellyon Sweet 1829			
Geum × meinshausenii Gams.			
Geum mexicanum Rydb.			
Geum meyerianum Rydb. 1913		North America	
Geum microphyllum Gasp. ex Ten.			
Geum molle Vis. & Pancic		Southeastern Europe	
Geum montanum L. 1753: Parageum montanum H.Hara	alpine avens		

=== O ===
Species & Synonyms	Common Names	Native Range	Illustration
Geum oligocarpum J.Krause: Coluria oligocarpa (J.Krause) F.Bolle	Wen chuan wu wei guo		
Geum oregonense (Scheutz) Rydberg			

=== P ===
Species & Synonyms	Common Names	Native Range	Illustration
Geum parviflorum Comm. ex Sm.: Geum involucratum Jussieu			
Geum peckii Pursh	mountain avens	Northeastern North America	
Geum pentapetalum (L.) Makino	Aleutian avens		
Geum pentaphyllum Makino			
Geum perincisum Rydberg 1913: Geum macrophyllum ssp. perincisum (Rydberg) Hultén 1946; Geum macrophyllum var. perincisum (Rydberg) Raup 1931			
Geum peruvianum Focke 1906		Northwestern South America	
Geum potaninii Juz. 1941: Geum aleppicum Jacq. 1786	yellow avens	Eurasia; North America	
Geum potentilloides Aiton			
Geum pulchrum Fernald			
Geum pusillum			
Geum pyrenaicum Mill.	Pyrenean avens		

=== Q ===
Species & Synonyms	Common Names	Native Range	Illustration
Geum quellyon Sweet 1829	scarlet avens; Chilean avens; Grecian rose	Central Chile	

=== R ===
Species & Synonyms	Common Names	Native Range	Illustration
Geum radiatum Michx. 1803: Sieversia radiata (Michx.) G. Don 1832	Appalachian avens; cliff avens; spread avens; spreading avens	North Carolina; Tennessee	
Geum reptans L. 1753	snodhoppers (West Coast of Florida)	Europe	
Geum rivale L.	water avens; purple avens	Eurasia; North America	
Geum rivale ssp. urbanum Á. Löve & D. Löve: Geum urbanum L. 1753		Europe; Middle East	
Geum rossii (R. Br.) Ser. 1825: Sieversia rossii R. Br. 1823; Acomastylis rossii (R. Br.) Greene 1906	Ross' avens		
Geum rossii var. depressum (Greene) C.L. Hitchc.	Ross' avens	Washington (state)	
Geum rossii var. turbinatum (Rydberg) C.L. Hitchc.	Ross' avens	Western United States	
Geum rotundifolium (L.) Moench 1794: Miscopetalum rotundifolium (L.) Haw. 1812; Saxifraga rotundifolia L. 1753	round-leaved saxifrage	Europe	

=== S ===
Species & Synonyms	Common Names	Native Range	Illustration
Geum schofieldii Calder & Roy L. Taylor 1965			
Geum scopulorum Greene 1900		Colorado	
Geum sericeum Greene 1897: Acomastylis sericea (Greene) Greene 1899; Acomastylis sericea (Greene) Greene 1906			
Geum × spurium Fisch. & C.A.Meyer			
Geum strictum Aiton 1789: Geum aleppicum Jacq. 1786			
Geum strictum var. bipinnatum Batalin 1893: Geum aleppicum Jacq. 1786		Europe	
Geum strictum var. decurrens (Rydberg) Kearney & Peebles 1939: Geum decurrens Rydb. 1913; Geum aleppicum var. decurrens (Rydb.) W.A. Weber 1979			
Geum sylvaticum Pourr. 1788: Geum atlanticum Desf. 1798; Geum pyrenaeum Ramond 1800; Geum biflorum Brot. 1804; Geum atlantica (Desf.) G.Don 1832; Geum sylvaticum var. carpetanum Lázaro Ibiza 1895; Geum pyrenaicum var. sylvaticum (Pourr.) Fiori 1898; Geum sylvaticum var. atlanticum (Desf.) Font Quer & Pau 1927; Geum sylvaticum var. pseudomontanum Rivas Goday & Borja 1961		Europe	

=== T ===
Species & Synonyms	Common Names	Native Range	Illustration
Geum triflorum Pursh 1813: Erythrocoma triflora (Pursh) Greene 1906; Sieversia triflora (Pursh) R. Br. 1823	long-plumed purple avens; old man's whiskers; prairie smoke; three-flowered avens	North America	
Geum triflorum var. campanulatum (Greene) C.L.Hitchc. 1961: Erythrocoma campanulata Greene 1906; Sieversia campanulata (Greene) Rydb. 1913; Geum campanulatum (Greene) G.N.Jones 1936		Washington (state); Oregon	
Geum triflorum var. canescens (Greene) Kartesz & Gandhi			
Geum triflorum var. ciliatum (Pursh) Fassett			
Geum turbinatum Rydberg 1897: Geum rossii var. turbinatum (Rydberg) C.L. Hitchc.			

=== U ===
Species & Synonyms	Common Names	Native Range	Illustration
Geum umbrosum (L.) Moench 1794: Saxifraga umbrosa L. 1762	London pride saxifrage	Spanish Pyrenees	
Geum uniflorum Buch			
Geum urbanum L.	wood avens; herb bennet; colewort; St. Benedict's herb (herba benedicta)	Europe; Middle East	
Geum urbanum ssp. oregonense Scheutz 1870: Geum macrophyllum var. rydbergii Farw. 1938			

=== V ===
Species & Synonyms	Common Names	Native Range	Illustration
Geum vernum (Raf.) Torr. & A. Gray 1840: Stylypus vernus Raf. 1825	heart-leaf avens; spring avens	Eastern North America	
Geum vidalii Franch. & Sav.: Geum aleppicum Jacq.	lu bian qing		
Geum virginianum L. 1753: Geum flavum E.P. Bicknell 1896; Geum hirsutum Muhl. ex Link 1813	cream avens; pale avens	Eastern North America	
