= Geum borisii =

Geum borisii may refer to the following plants of the genus Geum:

- in botanical literature:
  - Geum borisii J. Kellerer & Sünd. = the hybrid Geum bulgaricum × Geum montanum
  - Geum borisii Kellerer = the hybrid Geum bulgaricum × Geum reptans
- in gardening literature:
  - Geum coccineum
  - Geum quellyon
