= Geum molle =

Scientific classification
- Kingdom: Plantae
- Clade: Tracheophytes
- Clade: Angiosperms
- Clade: Eudicots
- Clade: Rosids
- Order: Rosales
- Family: Rosaceae
- Genus: Geum
- Species: G. molle

Binomial name
- Geum molle Vis. & Pančić

Synonyms
- Geum gasparrinii Pignatti

Species of flowering plant

Geum molle is a species of flowering plant of the genus Geum (avens) in the family Rosaceae. A perennial herbaceous plant found on meadows, it is native to the mountains of the Balkan Peninsula and Italy. It blooms with yellow flowers between June and August.

== Distribution ==
The plant is found in several of the mountains of southern Bosnia and Herzegovina, Montenegro, Kosovo (the Prokletije mountain range), northernmost Greece, eastern and northern Albania, the west and north of the Republic of Northern Macedonia, and western Bulgaria (at elevations of 1000–1800 m in central and western Stara Planina, Vitosha Kraishte, Osogovo, Rila, Pirin and the western Rhodopes). Within Italy, it grows in scattered localities in the central and southern Apennines: in the Umbria-Marche Apennines, in Abruzzo, the Alburni in Campania, near Monte Arioso in Basilicata, and on La Sila in Calabria.

== Hybrids ==
The hybrid Geum molle × Geum rivale, sometimes known as Geum pseudomolle Pant., is found in eastern Montenegro's Crna Planina, western Bulgaria's Vitosha, and probably elsewhere. Geum molle × Geum coccineum has been noted in Vitosha.
