= Draba graminea =

Conservation status
- Vulnerable (NatureServe)

Scientific classification
- Kingdom: Plantae
- Clade: Tracheophytes
- Clade: Angiosperms
- Clade: Eudicots
- Clade: Rosids
- Order: Brassicales
- Family: Brassicaceae
- Genus: Draba
- Species: D. graminea

Binomial name
- Draba graminea Greene

Species of flowering plant

Draba graminea is a species of flowering plant in the mustard family known by the common names Rocky Mountain draba and San Juan Whitlow-grass. It is endemic to the state of Colorado in the United States, where it is limited to the San Juan Mountains.

This species is a small perennial herb forming a clump just a few centimeters tall. The leaves are linear to lance-shaped. The inflorescence is a raceme of up to 15 flowers with yellow petals up to half a centimeter long. The fruit is a flattened oval or lance-shaped silique up to 1.1 centimeters long.

This plant grows in high mountain habitat types, mainly in alpine climates, and sometimes in the subalpine zone. It grows in rocky talus and tundra habitat, most commonly in the latter. It grows in areas where snow persists most of the year. The soils are gravelly and sandy and mostly of volcanic origin. The plant can be found in rock cracks. Associated plants include Ranunculus macauleyi, Poa alpina, Festuca brachyphylla ssp. coloradensis, Geum rossii var. turbinatum, and Silene acaulis var. subacaulescens.

Threats to the species are uncertain due to the remoteness and inaccessibility of the habitat. The main threat is thought to be recreational activity.
