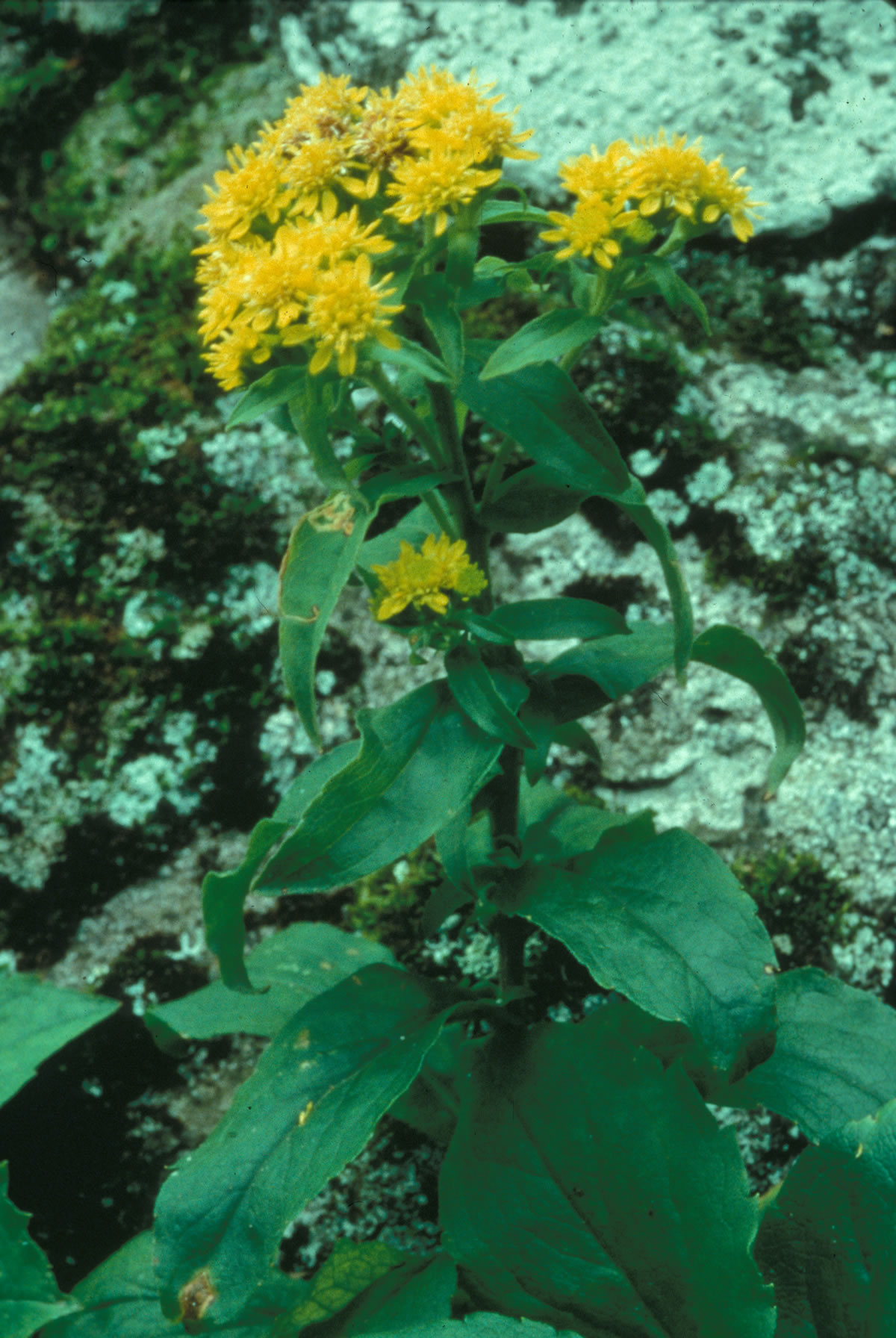

Conservation status
- Imperiled (NatureServe)

Scientific classification
- Kingdom: Plantae
- Clade: Tracheophytes
- Clade: Angiosperms
- Clade: Eudicots
- Clade: Asterids
- Order: Asterales
- Family: Asteraceae
- Genus: Solidago
- Species: S. spithamaea

Binomial name
- Solidago spithamaea M.A.Curtis ex A.Gray

Synonyms
- Aster spithamaeus (M.A.Curtis ex A.Gray) Kuntze

= Solidago spithamaea =

Species of flowering plant

Solidago spithamaea is a species of flowering plant in the family Asteraceae known by the common name Blue Ridge goldenrod. It is native to a very small region around the border between North Carolina and Tennessee in the United States. Its three remaining populations are threatened by the loss and degradation of its habitat. It is a federally listed threatened species of the United States.

== Description ==
Solidago spithamaea produces one or more stems from an underground rhizome and caudex, and it grows 10 to 40 centimeters (4-14 inches) tall. The plant has an unpleasant scent. The leaves vary in shape and size, the ones higher on the stem becoming smaller. The inflorescence is a compact or spreading array of 15 to 50 or more flower heads. Each head has a bell-shaped base about half a centimeter (0.2 inches) long which is lined with phyllaries with pointed, darkened tips. The head contains 8-15 yellow ray florets just a few millimeters long, surrounding 20-60 disc florets. The fruit is an achene with a pappus of bristles.

== Habitat ==
Solidago spithamaea grows on the high summits of the Blue Ridge Mountains in western North Carolina and eastern Tennessee. There is one population each in Avery and Mitchell Counties in North Carolina and Carter County, Tennessee, a region measuring about 15 square miles (38 km^{2}). It can be found on Grandfather Mountain, Hanging Rock, and Roan Mountain. It grows on rocky peaks, cliffs, and slopes covered in talus.

The habitat is mostly barren and exposed to full sun and harsh winter weather. This is one of several goldenrods that are relict species, plants that were more common when conditions were colder and wetter. As glaciers receded, the area became warmer and drier, and plants such as this goldenrod were left in areas that most resemble the alpine climate to which it was adapted. It now persists in the high mountain peaks that have the harshest winter conditions. Few of the relict goldenrods remain as far south as this one.

Other plants in this barren habitat include mainly grasses and sedges, but there are some other rare mountain herbs and trees including Heller's blazingstar (Liatris helleri), red spruce (Picea rubens), cliff avens (Geum radiatum), and sandmyrtle (Kalmia buxifolia).

The very habitat where the plant persists is an area popular for hiking and sightseeing, and much of it has been converted to roads, trails, parking lots, and other utilities. Remaining habitat is vulnerable to trampling. Other threats include acid precipitation and climate change.
