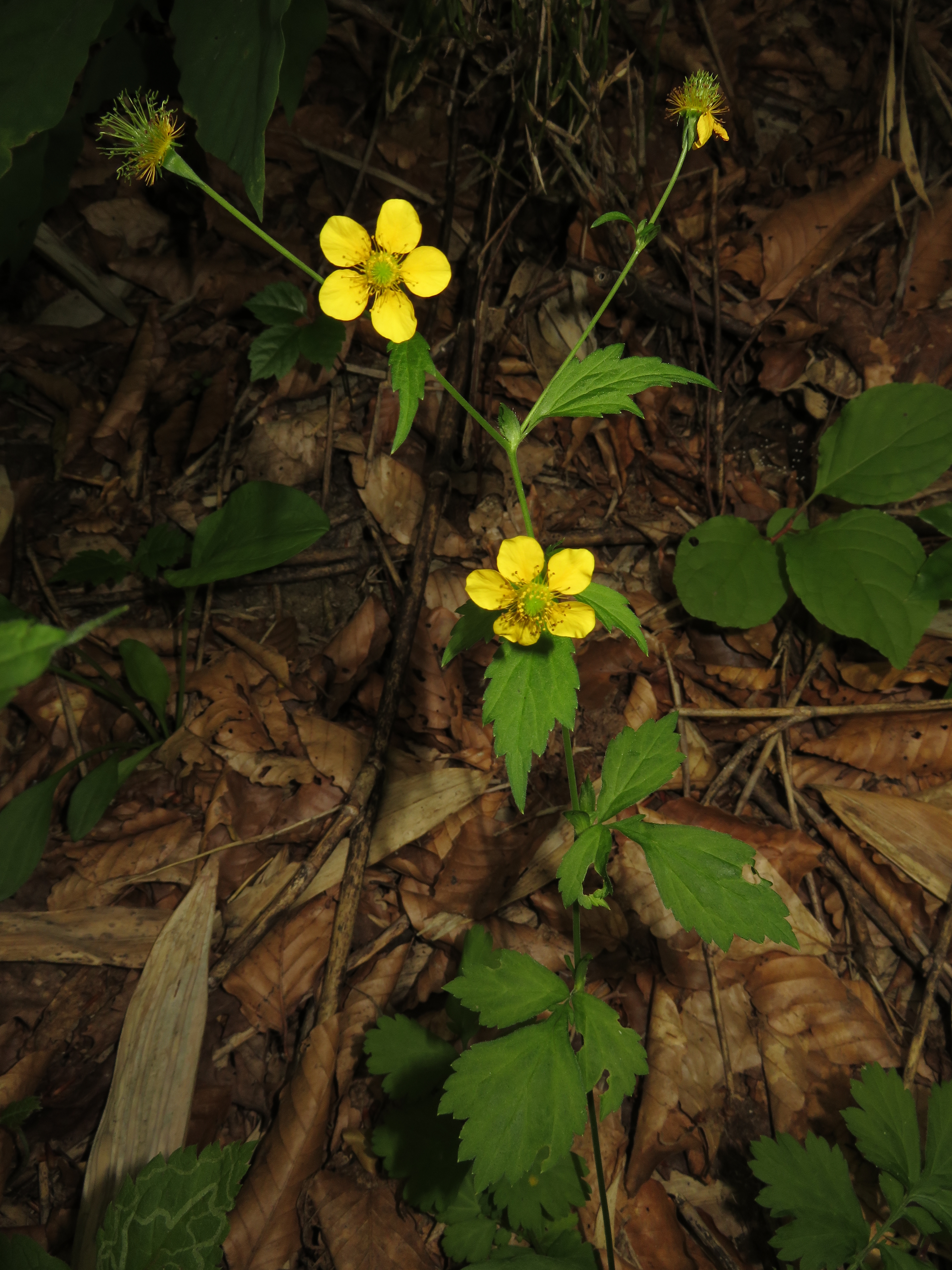

Scientific classification
- Kingdom: Plantae
- Clade: Tracheophytes
- Clade: Angiosperms
- Clade: Eudicots
- Clade: Rosids
- Order: Rosales
- Family: Rosaceae
- Genus: Geum
- Species: G. japonicum

Binomial name
- Geum japonicum Thunb.

= Geum japonicum =

Species of flowering plant

Geum japonicum, known as Asian herb bennet, is a yellow-flowering perennial plant native to North America and East Asia, especially Japan. It may be synonymous with Geum macrophyllum, the North American flower. As a traditional herbal remedy it is known as an astringent and used in poultices. However, in recent years, the Thunberg variant has received attention for other possible medical uses.

With regard to muscular recovery, an extract has been found to help muscles recover following "severe injury", to reduce myocardial infarct size by 35–45% when administered following a heart attack. It also has possible anti-viral properties, including action against HIV and HSV. Action against tumors has also been noted.
