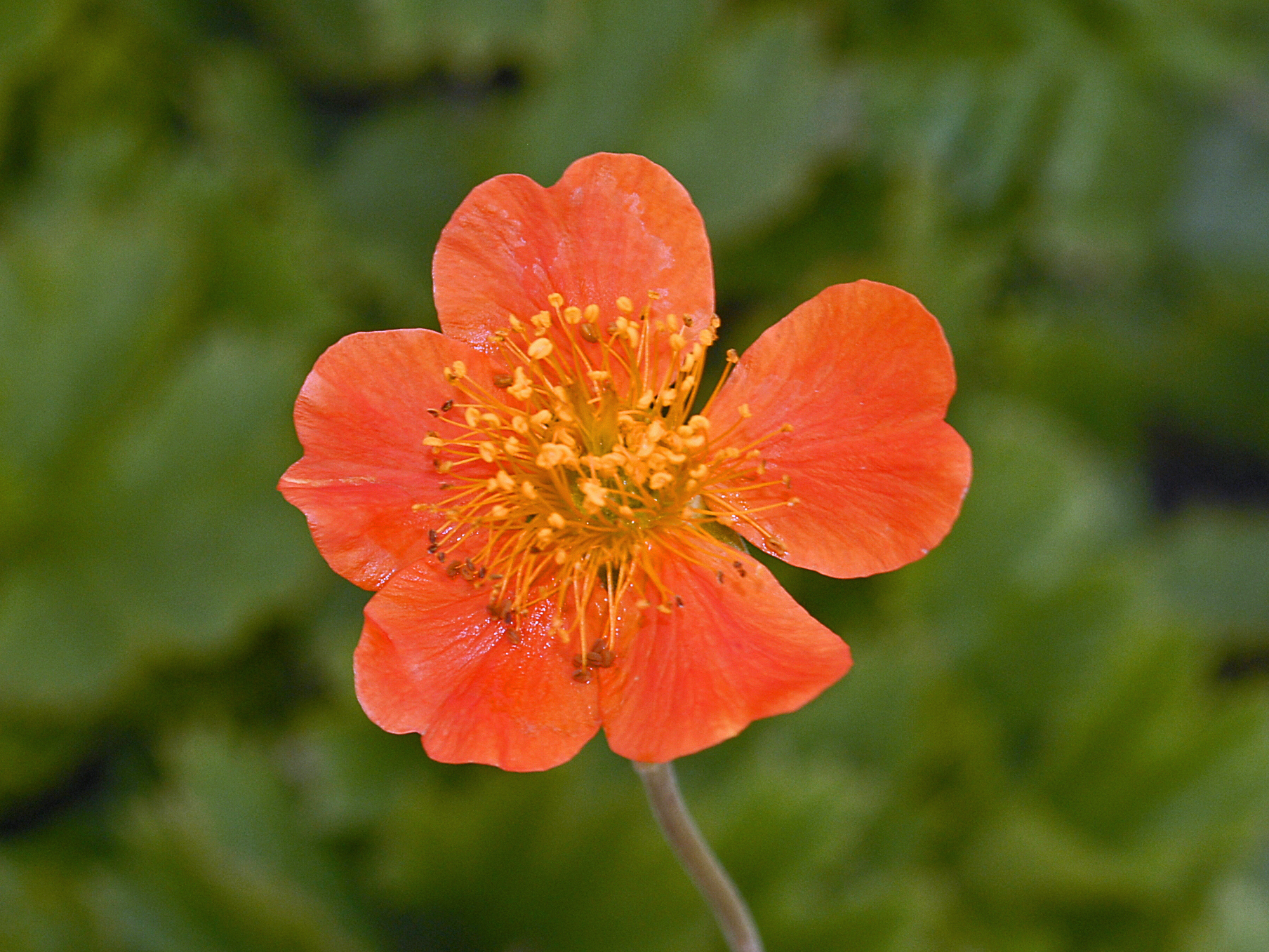
- Flower of Geum coccineum at the Giardino Botanico Alpino Chanousia

Scientific classification
- Kingdom: Plantae
- Clade: Tracheophytes
- Clade: Angiosperms
- Clade: Eudicots
- Clade: Rosids
- Order: Rosales
- Family: Rosaceae
- Genus: Geum
- Species: G. coccineum

Binomial name
- Geum coccineum Sibth. & Sm.

= Geum coccineum =

Species of flowering plant

Geum coccineum is a species of flowering plant in the genus Geum, in the rose family Rosaceae. Native to the mountains of the Balkans and northern Turkey, it is also grown ornamentally for its bright red flowers.

== Nomenclature ==
In horticulture, it is also referred to as Geum borisii, but in the botanical literature following J. Kellerer & Sünd., this name is only used for the hybrid Geum bulgaricum × montanum. The name Geum coccineum is itself used in the gardening literature for another related plant: Geum quellyon Sweet (Geum chiloense Balbis.).

== Description ==
Geum coccineum is herbaceous and perennial, growing to a height of 10–45 cm. It blooms, with orange-red flowers, from May to August.

The species is hexaploid (with 2n=42), having six sets of chromosomes.

== Distribution and habitat ==
The plant is found on wet, marshy meadows and along streams.

Within Turkey, the plant is found at elevations of 1200–2400 m in a number of localities in the Pontic Mountains (including Karagöl in the province of Gümüşhane, Zigana in Trabzon, and Cimil in Rize), in the Erzurum area, in the Ilgaz Mountains of Kastamonu Province, Murat Dağ in Kütahya, and Uludağ (Bithynian Olympus) in the province of Bursa.

Geum coccineum grows in the mountains of Bulgaria (at elevations of 900–2300 m in the western and central Balkan Mountains, on Vitosha, Verila, Sredna Gora, Osogovo, Rila, Pirin, Slavyanka, and the western and central Rhodopes), Serbia (the Balkan Mountains), North Macedonia, and central Bosnia and Herzegovina. It is also present in the Accursed Mountains of Albania and Montenegro, in the mountains of eastern Albania, and northern Greece (at 1300–2000 m in northern Pindus and mountains of Greek Macedonia: Varnous, Vitsi, Pieria, Vermio, Piperitsa, Kajmakčalan and Tzena).

It is grown decoratively (with several cultivars), and as a garden escapee it has become naturalised in isolated areas of Slovenia and Saxony.
