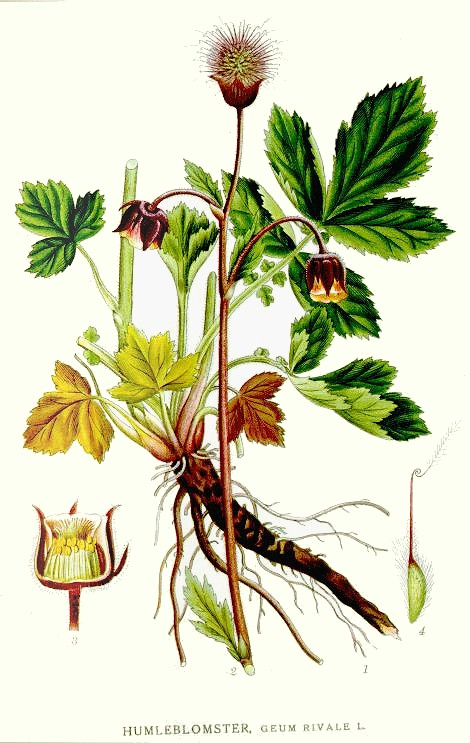
- Illustration of Geum rivale

Scientific classification
- Kingdom: Plantae
- Clade: Tracheophytes
- Clade: Angiosperms
- Clade: Eudicots
- Clade: Rosids
- Order: Rosales
- Family: Rosaceae
- Tribe: Colurieae
- Genus: Geum; L.

Species
- List of Geum species

Synonyms
- Synonymy: Acomastylis Greene; Coluria R.Br.; Erythrocoma Greene; Neosieversia (incorrect spelling of Novosieversia); Novosieversia F.Bolle; Oncostylus (Schltdl.) F.Bolle; Oreogeum (Ser.) E.I.Golubk.; Orthurus Juz.; Parageum Nakai & H.Hara; Stylypus Raf.; Taihangia T.T.Yu & C.L.Li; Waldsteinia Willd.

= Geum =

Genus of plants

Geum (L.) /ˈdʒiːəm/, commonly called avens, is a flowering plant genus of about 60 accepted species and hybrids, within the Rosaceae family in the order of Rosales, in the major group angiosperms. The species of the genus are widely distributed across Europe, Asia, North and South America, Africa, and New Zealand. They are closely related to Potentilla and Fragaria. From a basal rosette of leaves, they produce flowers on wiry stalks, in shades of white, red, yellow, and orange, in midsummer.

== Description ==
Species within Geum genus are herbaceous perennials, often rhizomatous and sometimes stoloniferous. 10–120 cm in height, though rarely above 60 cm, erect and simple stem, 1-5, either glabrous or hairy. , growing in a mounding habit. Geum species are evergreen except where winter temperatures drop below 0 °F (−18 °C). The most distinctive feature of many members of Geum is an geniculate-jointed style, that forms a hook. Though, this is not true for all species within the genus.

=== Leaves ===
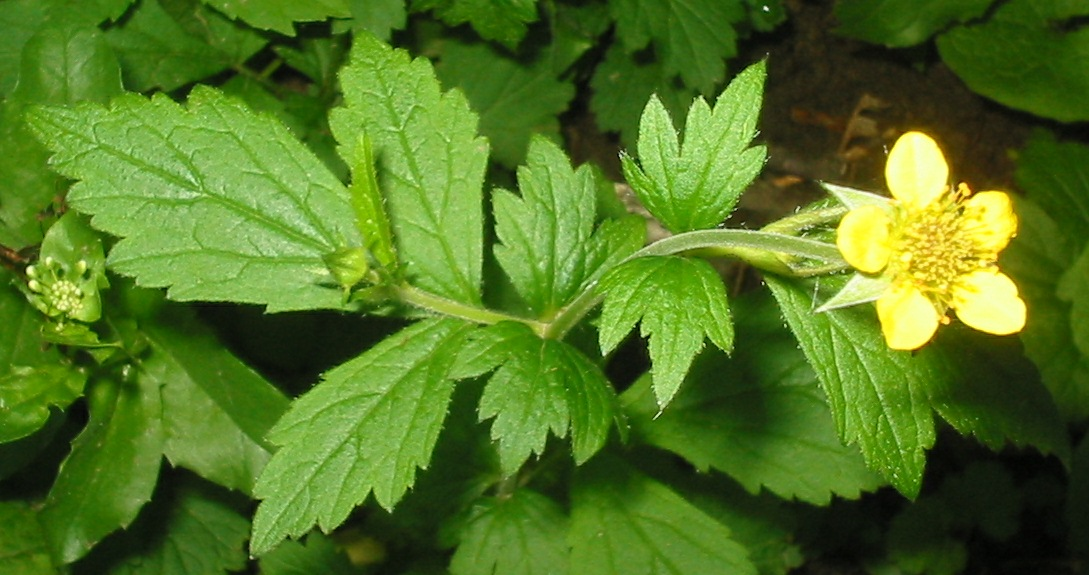
Leaves of Geum urbanum

Basal leaves pinnate or pseudopinnate, deeply lobed, winter-persistent, in some species leaf shape changes over the growing season. Cauline leaves few, often 3-foliolate but sometimes bractlike, or simple, lyrate-pinnate or odd-pinnate. Terminal leaflet commonly largest. Often smaller leaflets intermixed with larger ones. Stipules adnate to the petiole or blade, or more or less free, linear, lanceolate, or ovate, with entire, toothed, or lobed margins.

=== Inflourescence ===
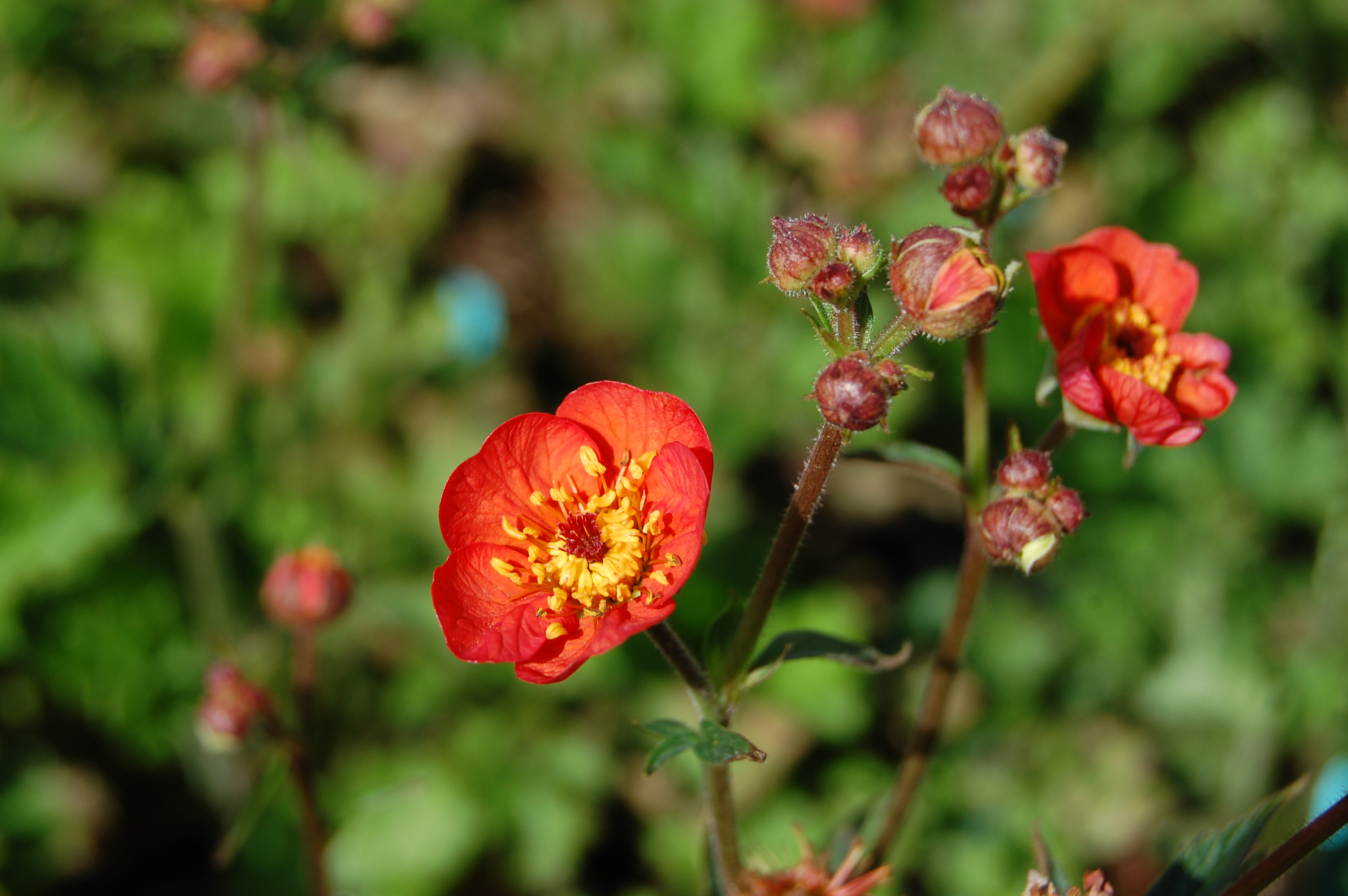
Flower of Geum quellyon

Terminal inflourescence bearing 1-18 flowers in open cymes. Flowers 4–46 mm diameter and bisexual. Sepals 5(-10), valvate and persistent. Bracteoles or epicalyx, often 5, small. Petals 5, orbicular or obovate, either yellow, white or red, color fades upon drying, ultimately turn cream to pale yellow.

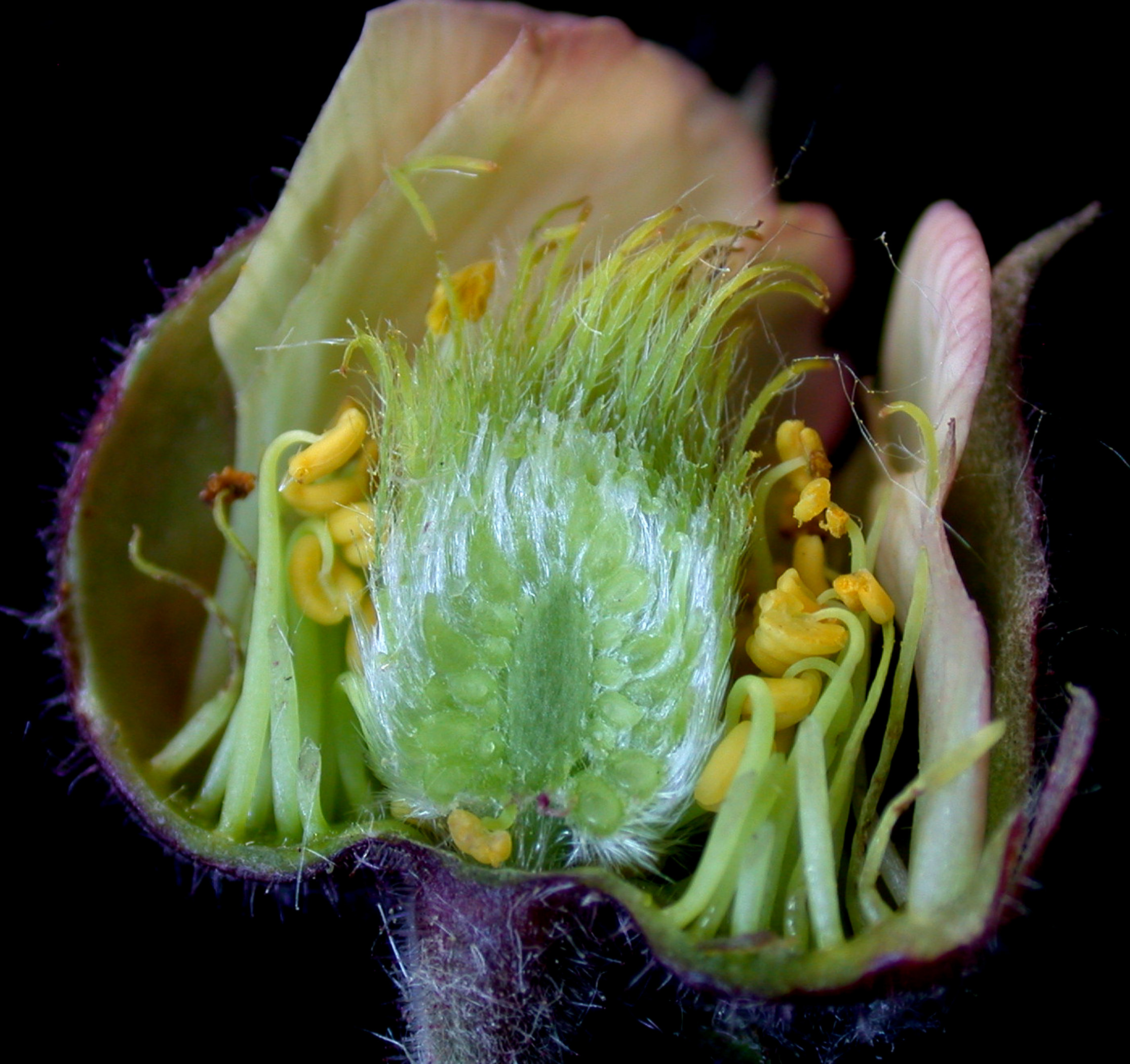
Cross section of a Geum rivale flower

A 2–6 mm hypanthium present, obconical or dome-shaped in shape, with a smooth or ribbed disc. Stamens numerous, [10–]25–120, shorter than petals. Carpels numerous, (2–)20–250(–450), free, slender, usually borne on cylindric receptacle. Ovule 1, ascending. Entire or jointed persistent filiform styles with deciduous distal portion; stigma recurved or hooked, or feathery, elongating to 10 mm, or not hooked and elongating to 70 mm.

=== Fruit ===
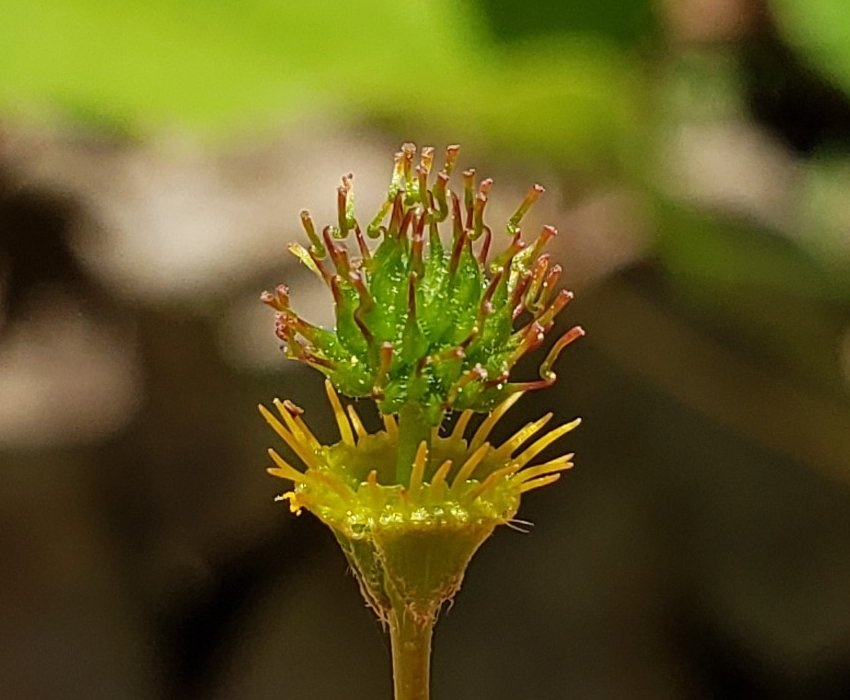
Geum vernum developing fruit

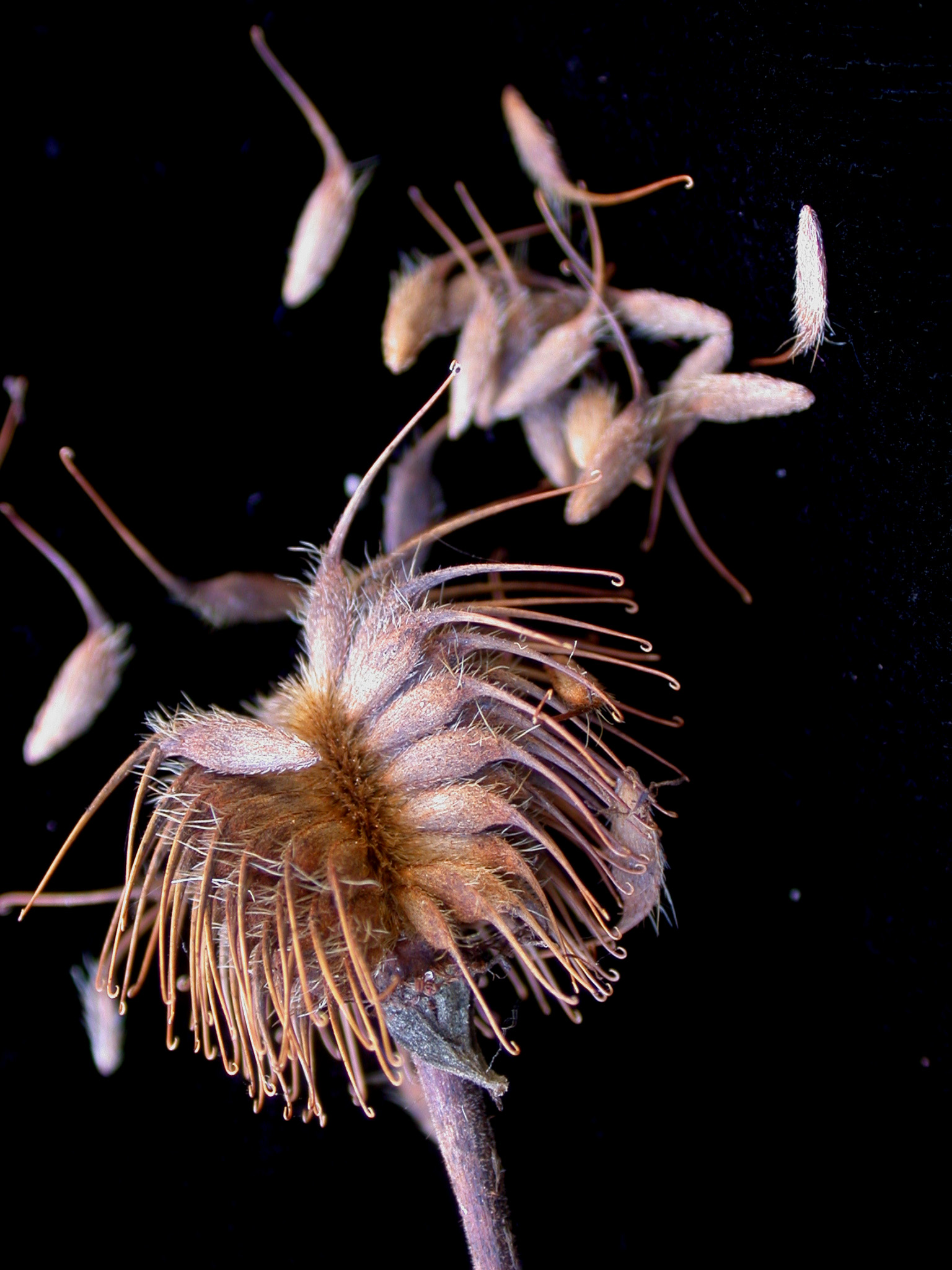
Fruit in Geum genus

The plant produces aggregated achenes, (2–)20–250(–450), 2–4.5 mm long, hairy, and sometimes stipitate. Fruit in erect position, with a long beak bearing a hook at the tip. Dispersed by animals.

== Distribution and ecology ==
Most of the species of the Geum genus occur in temperate and arctic-alpine regions, and several species are cultivated. Geum has a wide distribution mostly located in the northern hemisphere. They are native to Africa, North America, Mexico, South America, Eurasia, Pacific Islands (New Zealand), and Australia. Several Geum species prefer cooler climate and moist, well-drained soils, even though they are fairly tolerant of dry soils.

All countries where Geum species are present are listed on Plant of the World Online

=== Interspecific interactions ===
Geum species are used as host plants by several insects, for instance species in the orders Coleoptera, Diptera, Hemiptera, Hymenoptera and Lepidoptera. For instance, Geum urbanum is used as food by the larvae of the grizzled skipper Pyrgus malvae as well as Stigmella splendidissimella and Stigmella pretiosa, while Geum rivale is host to Geina didactyla and Stigmella pretiosa, among others.

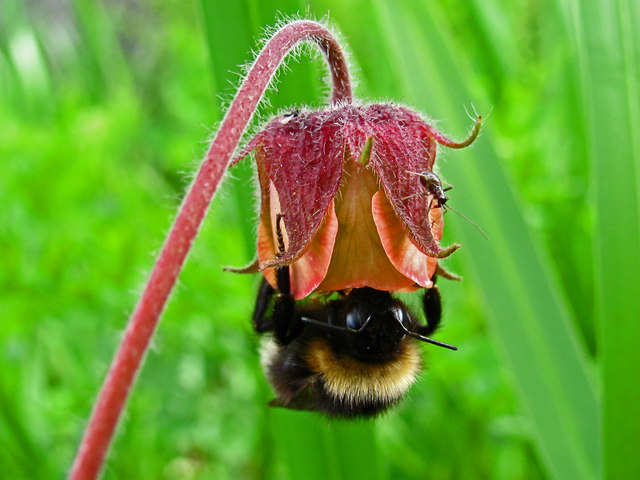
Bumblebee in Geum rivale

Flowers of Geum species also attract bees. Since some Geum species flower in early spring, they are of great value to overwintered bumblebee queens, which are also important pollinators of the flowers. Geum triflorum is one Geum species important not only to bumblebees, but also to beetles, wasps and ants that visit the flowers for nectar.

Several fungi live on Geum species. The rust fungi Puccinia can be found on at least Geum reptans, while 51 ascomycete fungi from the classes Sordariomycetes, Leotiomycetes, Dothideomycetes and Eurotiomycetes have been found on Geum peckii.

Further, endosymbionts have been found in roots of Geum species. One example is the nitrogen-fixing bacteria genus Rhizobium and the plant growth-promoting rhizobacteria Pseudarthrobacter sp. that have been extracted from the roots of Geum aleppicum.

== Utility to humans ==
Geum is used as a ornemental plant, as its flowers resemble small roses, and it has been a recurring—although not among the most commonly cultivated—genus in flower beds and ornamental gardens. The cultivar 'Mrs J. Bradshaw' (with orange flowers) has the Royal Horticultural Society's Award of Garden Merit.

The UK National Collection of Geum is held at Brickwall Cottage Garden and Nursery in Frittenden, Kent.

Moreover, Geum has long held medicinal importance. Species within the genus have traditionally been used in folk medicine as anti-inflammatory, antiseptic, diuretic, and astringent remedies. Contemporary pharmacological research has supported several of these traditional uses. According to Mo et al. (2025), the high tannin content found in Geum species is associated with anti-inflammatory, antioxidant, antimicrobial, cardioprotective, and antiviral activities.

== Etymology and taxonomy ==
The name Geum has been found in literature dating back to AD 77. The name Geum originates from the words geyo or geno, which is latinized Greek for "taste" referencing the roots of the plant, which smell like cloves when crushed.

=== Taxonomic history of Geum ===
The genus was first described by Gaspard Bauhin as Caryophyllata in 1623. Carl Linnaeus later assigned the genus its current name, Geum, in Species Plantarum (1753). Over the past centuries, several scientists have changed the classification of the genus, included or removed species. These classifications were mainly based on morphological features, primarily separating species due to deciduous or non-deciduous styles, or the presence of a fish-hook fruit type. Some of the contributors were Scheutz (1870), Focke (1894), Greene (1899), Rydberg (1913), Hultén (1929) and Bolle (1933).

Gajewski (1958) described the genus as a complex of polyploid species with high crossability between species, permitting the formation of numerous hybrids. Due to several different genome combinations, the genus was divided into distinct groups of species that differed in morphology and distribution, although all species were still classified within a single genus. Gajewski suggested that allopolyploidy has been a key factor affecting the speciation and evolution of the subgenus Geum, between the ancestors Waldsteinia and Geum montanum.

The delimitation and classification of Geum have continued to change several times during the last decades. Still, ongoing genetic research results in changes in both species and genus levels. W. Gajewski (1958) described Geum as a genus within the tribe Geeae together with the closely related genera Waldsteinia and Coluria. The tribe Geeae formed the subfamily Dryadoideae together with Cercocarpeae and Dryadeae within the family Rosaceae. The number of chromosomes seemed to differ between groups, where the woody plants with wind-dispersal strategy had a basic chromosome number of 9, while the herbaceous, more widely distributed and animal-dispersal adapted species - including Geum species - instead had a basic chromosome number of 7. In higher plants, the chromosome number of somatic cells is called the diploid number (“2n”), with one chromosome set inherited from each parent. This number varies widely between species, ranging from 2n = 4 to well over 200. The basic number of chromosomes in a haploid genome is described as ‘x,’.

This difference in basic chromosome number was further investigated by Wallaart (1980) that found a correlation between basic chromosome number of 9 and presence of sorbitol. Hebda and Chinnappa (1994) could further support that theory by identifying the common characteristic of striate microperforate pollen in Geum, Coluria, Fallugia, Orthurus, and Waldstein - all containing a basic chromosome number of 7. In addition to that theory, Morgan et al. (1994) added the presence of nitrogen-fixing bacteria in root nodules as a synapomorphy that divided species with 7 or 9 in basic chromosome number.

In recent molecular phylogenetic research, J. E. E. Smedmark et al. (2003) have tested the allopolyploidy hypothesis by Gajewski as well as explored the relationships within the group formerly known as Dryadeae, based on DNA sequences from chloroplast trnL-trnF region and ITS of nuclear ribosomal DNA. Their result does not support any of the previous circumscriptions of Geum as a monophyletic group or earlier suggested segregate genera, though some indications for allopolyploidy are found in the results. They suggest a delimitation of herbaceous perennials with a rosette of basal leaves in the tribe Colurieae as Geum in a broad sense, which is supported by the comparative genomic analyses of Fu et al. (2025).

=== Current classification of Geum ===
Geum belongs to the family Rosaceae, in the order Rosales. The closest related genera to Geum are Coluria, Fallugia and Waldsteinia. It also belongs to the tribe Rosideae, formerly known as Dryadeae. Geum form this subfamily together with about 38 other generas, including for instance Alchemilla and Rosa (plant). Some species within the subfamily are shrubs but most of them are herbaceous perennials, most frequently occurring in the northern hemisphere. Though, no morphological synapomorphies have been identified for Dryadeae.

The discussion on what to include or not in the genus of Geum is ongoing but a key characteristic that are more or less agreed upon is the fish-hook fruit type that almost all species within the genus have in common, though Geum vernum is an exception.

== Species list ==
As of May 2026, Plants of the World Online accepted the following (46) species and (15) hybrids:

- Geum aequilobatum K.M.Purohit & Panigrahi
- Geum aleppicum Jacq. - Yellow avens or common avens
- Geum andicola (Phil.) Reiche
- Geum × aurantiacum Fr. ex Scheutz - Orange avens
- Geum boliviense Focke
- Geum brevicarpellatum F.Bolle
- Geum bulgaricum Pančić
- Geum calthifolium Sm.
- Geum canadense Jacq. - White avens
- Geum capense Thunb.
- Geum × catlingii J.-P.Bernard & R.Gauthier - Catling's avens
- Geum coccineum Sm. - Dwarf orange avens
- Geum x convallis M.P.Wilcox
- Geum x cortlandicum M.Hough - Cortland Avens
- Geum elatum Wall. ex G.Don - High Avens
- Geum geniculatum Michx. - Bent avens
- Geum glaciale Adams ex Fisch. - Glacier Avens
- Geum x gonzaloi J.L.Lozano & Serra
- Geum × gudaricum Mateo & J.L.Lozano
- Geum x hainesianum M.Hough, A.V.Gilman & Chapm.-Lam
- Geum heterocarpum Boiss.
- Geum hispidum Fr.
- Geum × intermedium Ehrh. - Hybrid Avens
- Geum japonicum Thunb. - Asian herb bennet
- Geum kokanicum Regel & Schmalh.
- Geum laciniatum Murray – Rough avens
- Geum latilobum Sommier & Levier
- Geum × macneillii J.-P.Bernard & R.Gauthier
- Geum × macranthum (Kearney ex Rydb.) B.Boivin
- Geum macrophyllum Willd. - Largeleaf avens or large-leaved avens
- Geum macrosepalum Ludlow
- Geum magellanicum Comm. ex Pers.
- Geum × meinshausenii Gams
- Geum mexicanum Rydb.
- Geum molle Vis. & Pančić
- Geum montanum L. – Alpine avens
- Geum peckii Pursh – Mountain avens or Peck's avens
- Geum peruvianum Focke
- Geum × pratense Pau
- Geum × pulchrum Fernald
- Geum pyrenaicum Mill.
- Geum quellyon Sweet - Scarlet avens or Chilean avens
- Geum radiatum Michx. – Spreading avens or Appalachian avens
- Geum reptans L. – Creeping avens
- Geum rhodopeum Stoj. & Stef.
- Geum riojense F.Bolle
- Geum rivale L. - Water avens or purple avens
- Geum rossii (R.Br.) Ser. – Alpine avens
- Geum roylei Wall. ex F.Bolle - Himalayan Avens
- Geum rubrum (Ludlow) Khuroo, K.Hussain & Gulzar - Red avens
- Geum schofieldii Calder & Roy L.Taylor Haida Gwaii avens
- Geum sikkimense Prain
- Geum speciosum (Albov) Albov
- Geum × spurium C.A.Mey.
- Geum × sudeticum Tausch
- Geum sunhangii D.G.Zhang, T.Deng, Z.Y.Lv & Z.M.Li
- Geum sylvaticum Pourr.
- Geum triflorum Pursh – Prairie smoke or three-flowered avens
- Geum urbanum L. - Wood avens or herb Bennet
- Geum vernum (Raf.) Torr. & A.Gray – Spring avens
- Geum virginianum L. – Cream avens or Virginia avens

For a more detailed list see List of Geum species.
