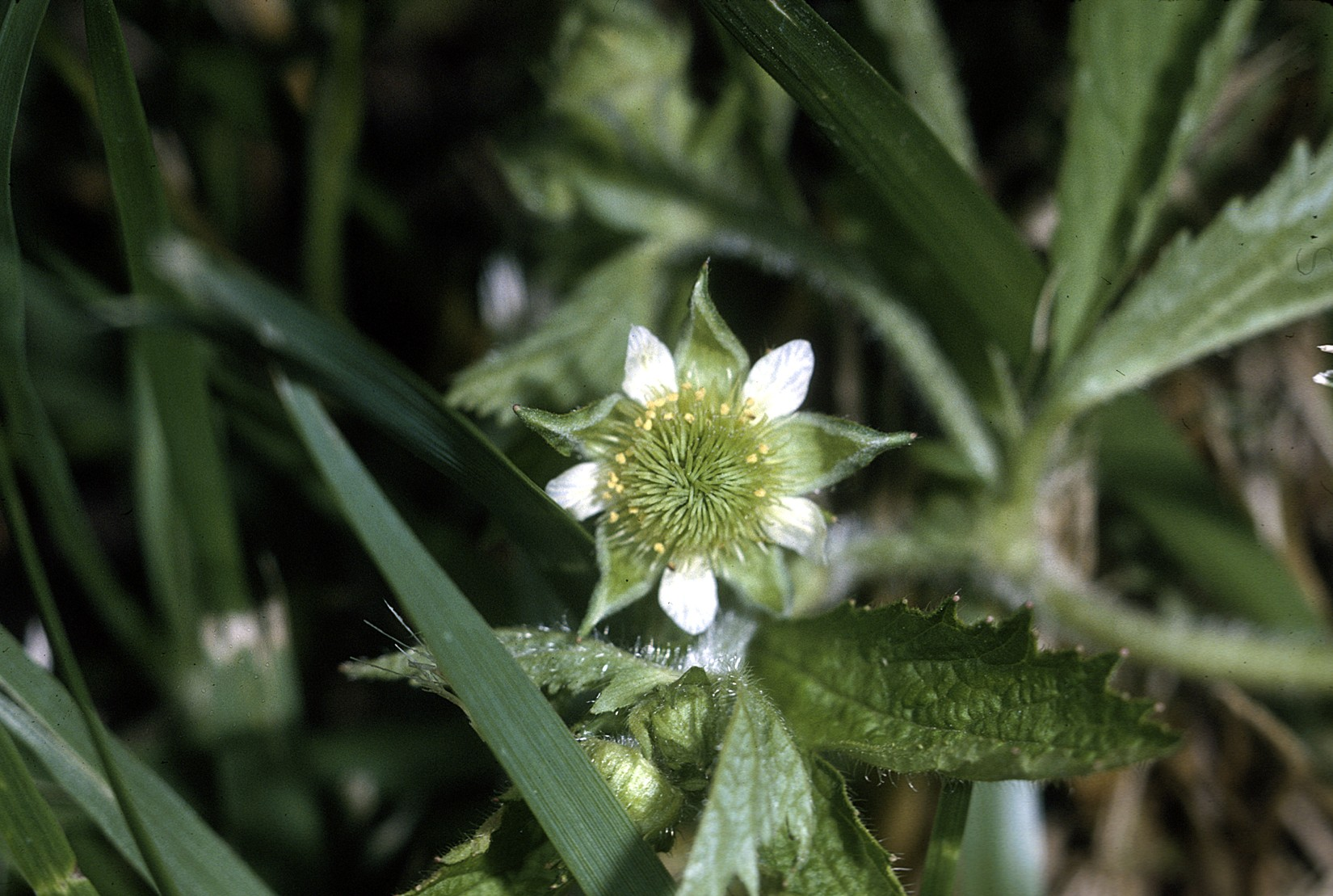

Conservation status
- Secure (NatureServe)

Scientific classification
- Kingdom: Plantae
- Clade: Tracheophytes
- Clade: Angiosperms
- Clade: Eudicots
- Clade: Rosids
- Order: Rosales
- Family: Rosaceae
- Genus: Geum
- Species: G. laciniatum

Binomial name
- Geum laciniatum Murray

= Geum laciniatum =

Species of flowering plant

Geum laciniatum (commonly named rough avens or hairy herb-bennet) is a member of the family Rosaceae. It is a perennial forb, native to eastern North America.
