= Ramond =

Ramond is a surname, and may refer to:

- Louis Ramond de Carbonnières (1755–1827), French politician, geologist and botanist, who gave his name to the Société Ramond
- Pierre Ramond (born 1943), Distinguished Professor of Physics at University of Florida in Gainesville, Florida
