= Geum geniculatum =

Conservation status
- Imperiled (NatureServe)

Scientific classification
- Kingdom: Plantae
- Clade: Tracheophytes
- Clade: Angiosperms
- Clade: Eudicots
- Clade: Rosids
- Order: Rosales
- Family: Rosaceae
- Genus: Geum
- Species: G. geniculatum

Binomial name
- Geum geniculatum Michx.

Species of flowering plant

Geum geniculatum is a species of flowering plant in the rose family known by the common name bent avens. It is endemic to the southern Appalachian Mountains in the United States, where it occurs on only five mountains: Grandfather Mountain, Snake Mountain, and Rich Mountain in North Carolina, Roan Mountain straddling the North Carolina-Tennessee border, and Whitetop Mountain in Virginia.

Geum geniculatum is a perennial herb growing 50 to 70 cm (20 to 28 in) tall. The three-parted leaves are 1 to 1.5 cm (0.4 to 0.6 in) long. The clustered flowers have white, pinkish, or greenish petals. Flowering occurs in summer. The flowers are likely pollinated by bumblebees and honeybees.

This may be a relict species, limited in distribution to the peaks of mountains where conditions are cool and wet enough for it to survive. It grows on moist boulder fields and streambanks. It often grows in shady conditions in a thick herb layer with rhododendrons and other plants.

There are only five known populations of this species. It can be locally common and is largely protected on federal and state lands, but it can be threatened by deer browse, canopy loss, and encroachment of woody vegetation.
