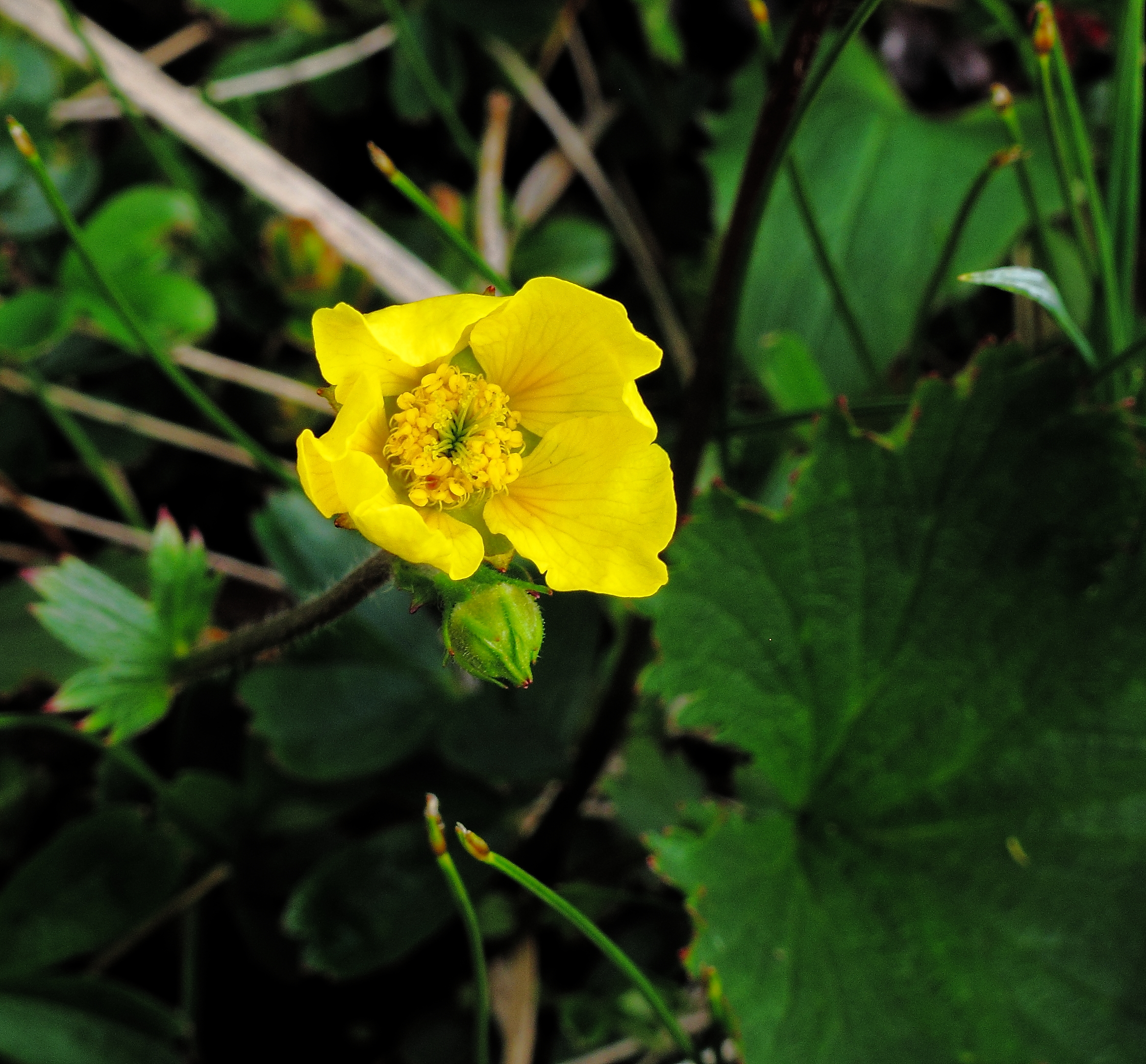

Conservation status
- Imperiled (NatureServe)

Scientific classification
- Kingdom: Plantae
- Clade: Tracheophytes
- Clade: Angiosperms
- Clade: Eudicots
- Clade: Rosids
- Order: Rosales
- Family: Rosaceae
- Genus: Geum
- Species: G. peckii

Binomial name
- Geum peckii Pursh

= Geum peckii =

Species of flowering plant

Geum peckii, commonly known as mountain avens, Eastern mountain avens, Peck's avens, or Benoîte de Peck in French, is a species of herbaceous, perennial flowering plant in the rose family. It is native to eastern North America, where it is known from only two locations, the White Mountains of New Hampshire and three sites in Nova Scotia.

It is named after the American naturalist William Dandridge Peck, who first collected the plant on Mount Washington in 1804.

== Description ==
G. peckii is an herbaceous perennial growing 7–40 cm tall (2.8–15.7 in). The stems are covered with fine, downy hairs.

It has compound leaves made up of several rounded leaflets. Yellow flowers 1 to 3 centimetres (0.39 to 1.18 in) wide are produced in June through September. The plant reproduces vegetatively via rhizome and sexually via seed. Each flower produces about 50 seeds. In New Hampshire the flowers are likely pollinated by flies.

== Distribution and habitat ==
G. peckii has an extremely limited range and is known from 28 occurrences, 19 of which are found in the White Mountains of New Hampshire, with the remaining 9 found on Brier Island and Digby Neck in Nova Scotia. The total population is estimated to be in the tens of thousands, with less than 3,000 individuals in Novia Scotia.

In the White Mountains, it grows in alpine streamside ravines and snowfields, being associated with rocky heath-meadow communities at 1,200–1,830 m in elevation (3,940–6,000 ft). It may also be found at subalpine elevations of 425–760 m (1,390–2,490 ft) along high-gradient streams. In Nova Scotia, it is found near sea-level in bogs and other coastal wetlands.

Climate change may reduce available habitat for this plant by making it easier for trees and shrubs to grow and encroach on the open habitat required by the plant. This is already occurring on Brier Island, Nova Scotia. Other threats include ecotourism and overcollection. Ditch construction on Brier Island has lowered the water table, making it easier for gulls to nest in the area. The gulls bring in the seeds of weedy plants.

== Conservation status and threats ==
G. peckii is designated as an imperiled (G2) species globally by NatureServe. In New Hampshire it is imperiled (S2) and in Nova Scotia it is critically imperiled (S1).

In New Hampshire, it is vulnerable to trampling by hikers and potentially threatened by nutrient inputs from nearby overnight huts. In Nova Scotia, the species has experienced decline due to the effects of drainage ditch construction. In Brier Island, drainage ditches have lowered the water table enough to attract roosting gulls. The droppings of the gulls raise the nutrient levels in the soils and act as a vector for the spread of weedy plants.

== Similar species ==
Geum peckii is morphologically indistinguishable from Geum radiatum, but genetic research has supported the maintenance of the two as separate species.
