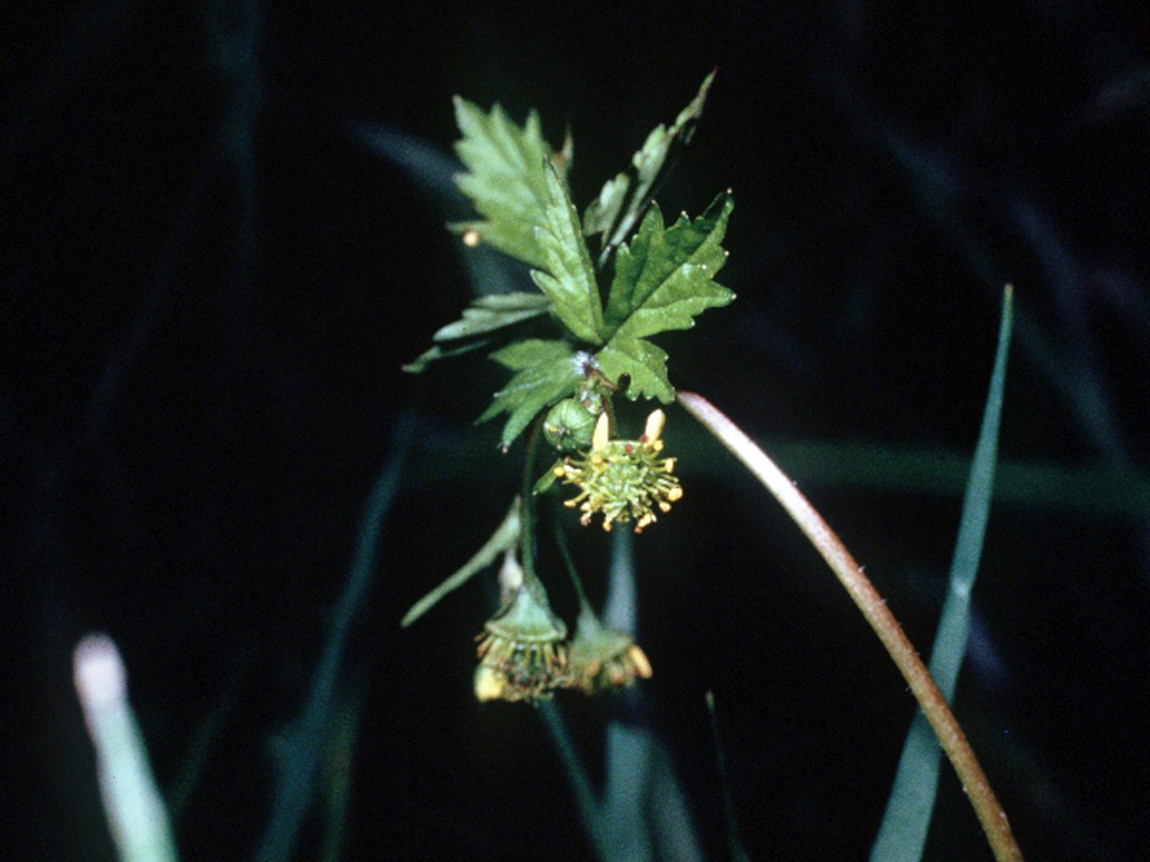

Scientific classification
- Kingdom: Plantae
- Clade: Tracheophytes
- Clade: Angiosperms
- Clade: Eudicots
- Clade: Rosids
- Order: Rosales
- Family: Rosaceae
- Genus: Geum
- Species: G. vernum

Binomial name
- Geum vernum (Raf.) Torr. & A.Gray, 1840

Synonyms
- Stylypus vernus Raf., 1825

= Geum vernum =

Species of flowering plant

Geum vernum, also known as spring avens, is a herbaceous perennial plant native to the northeastern part of the United States that grows in floodplains and rich woods in the late spring. The species was used to study the fruit evolution in allopolyploid species of Geum and in the preparation of an antimicrobial substance in 1948.

== Description ==
Geum vernum flowers in late spring, from May to June. The species has a yellow flower and green foliage, a height of 1.6 feet at maturity and grows a single crown. It is a perennial plant with a two-year life cycle. It is from the Rosaceae family, meaning the G. vernum's simple rotate flower has five single petals, a sepal and stamens. G. vernum grow in floodplains, along with Floerkea proserpinacoides, Glechoma hederacea, Laportea canadensis, Leersia virginica, Lilium canadense, Poa alsodes, and Viburnum acerifolium. The species has been used in several studies to investigate the fruit evolution in allopolyploid species of Geum; it has also been tested for antimicrobial properties. The species was found to inhibit the growth of Staphylococcus aureus in the cream filling meant for various pastries in the mid-1940s.

== Taxonomy ==
Joseph Torrey, the former President of the University of Vermont, identified what is now known as G. vernum as Geum album in the mid-1960s. The plant was then labeled as Geum canadense until it was eventually reclassified based on the small mark of its calyx and the elongated stripe on its receptacle.

== Plant development ==
In the earlier stages of the Geum plant's fruit development, the ovary's joint is positioned in the same way in all lineages of Geum. G. vernum is in the hexaploid clade along with G. rivale, G. urbanum, G. montanum, G. triflorum, and G. reptans. The Geum plants in this clade develop a hook away from the base of the style causing a "fish hook" fruit, but although all Geum species in the clade develop this fruit, phylogenetic analysis of molecular data has concluded that G. vernum does not form it in the same way, even though the fruit appears similar to that of the other species at maturity. G. vernum's fruit development begins with a gynoecial primordia developing from the floral apex that then differentiates into the hypanthium and a gynophore that carries the gynoecium. A furrow portion on the carpal then extends into what will be the style, while the carpal develops a tubular shape that connects to the ovary. The style and ovary develop hair and the style then curves into a hook shape, which matures when the style is less than one millimeter in length. G. vernum develops this "fish hook" fruit from late June to the middle of August.
