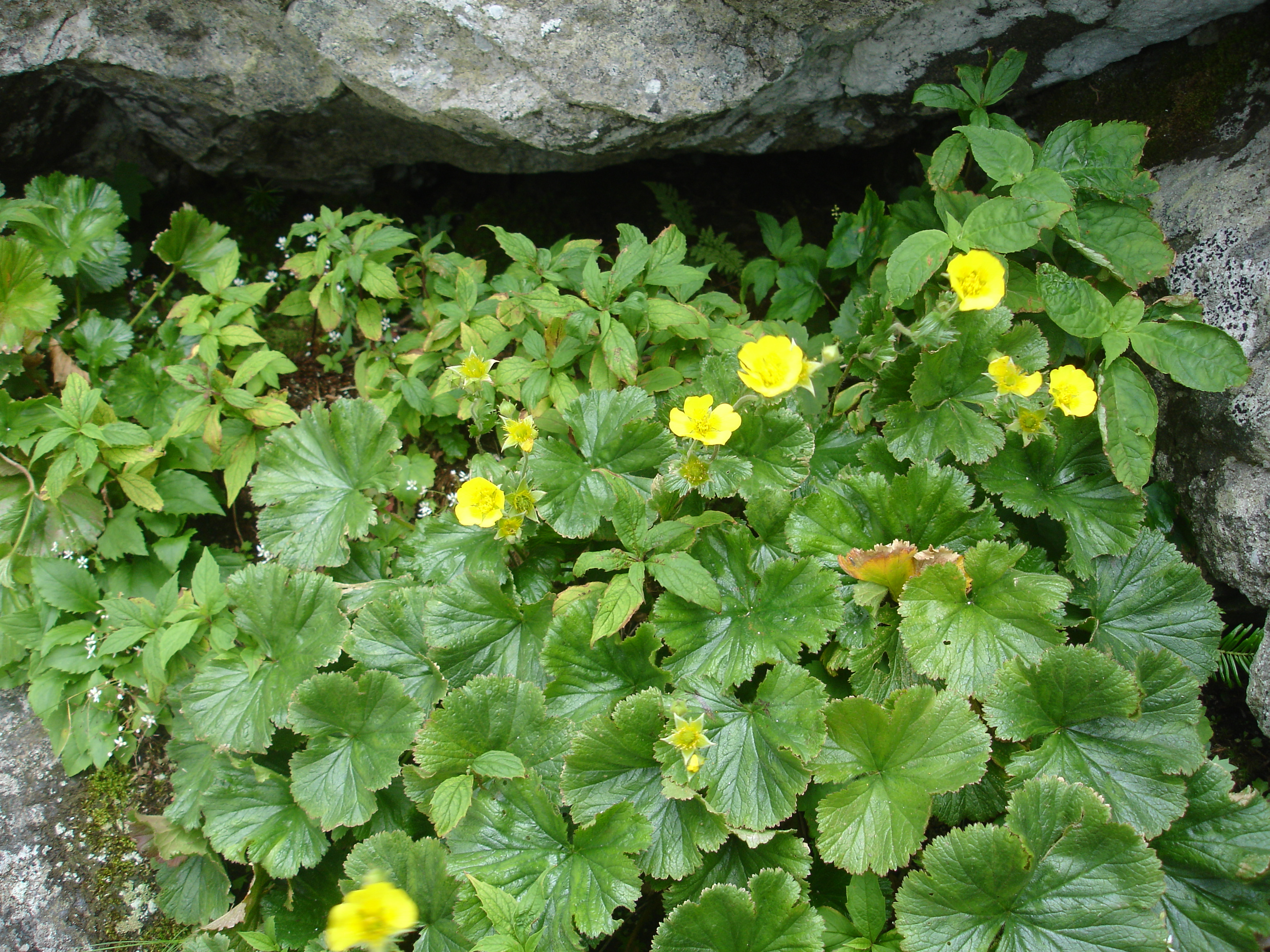

Conservation status
- Imperiled (NatureServe)

Scientific classification
- Kingdom: Plantae
- Clade: Tracheophytes
- Clade: Angiosperms
- Clade: Eudicots
- Clade: Rosids
- Order: Rosales
- Family: Rosaceae
- Genus: Geum
- Species: G. radiatum

Binomial name
- Geum radiatum Michx. 1903 not Pursh 1814

Synonyms
- Sieversia radiata (Michx.) G.Don; Acomastylis radiata F.Bolle; Parageum radiatum H.Hara

= Geum radiatum =

Species of flowering plant

Geum radiatum is a rare species of flowering plant in the rose family known by the common names spreading avens, Appalachian avens, and cliff avens. It is native to the region of the border between Tennessee and North Carolina in the southeastern United States, where there are eleven known populations remaining. The plant was federally listed as an endangered species in 1990.

Geum radiatum is a perennial herb with a horizontal rhizome spreading beneath the soil. From the rhizome, several rosettes of leaves sprout. What may appear to be separate plants are actually all clones belonging to one genetic individual, as the plant reproduces vegetatively. The large leaves are decidedly kidney-shaped. The stems grow 20 centimeters to half a meter (8-20 inches) tall and produces bright yellow flowers in the summer months. This Geum looks very different from other species in its genus that grow in the area. Its closest relative is probably Geum peckii, which does not occur in the same region.

Geum radiatum grows on a few tall mountaintops above 1310 meters (4367 feet) elevation in the southern Appalachians in eastern Tennessee and western North Carolina. It sprouts from steep, often vertical cliffs, anchored by its rhizome. Conditions are exposed and sunny, and the soil is acidic and gravelly. Other plants in the habitat include Solidago spithamaea, Kalmia buxifolia, Menziesia pilosa, Rhododendron catawbiense, Heuchera villosa, Micranthes petiolaris, and species of asters, sedges, and grasses. The forests around the cliffs are dominated by red spruce (Picea rubens).

Fifteen known populations exist. Three others have been extirpated; these occurred in areas that were popular recreational sites for hiking, mountain climbing, and other uses. Threats to the remaining populations include erosion, soil compaction from trampling, and development of facilities for recreation, such as trails, ski slopes, parking lots, and bridges. Poaching is also a problem for this species as a mountain wildflower with showy yellow blooms. Pollution, including acid rain, may be a threat. Some of the few remaining populations are small, with fewer than 50 plants, and the number of genetically separate individuals may be smaller. Climate change threatens the long term viability of this species.
