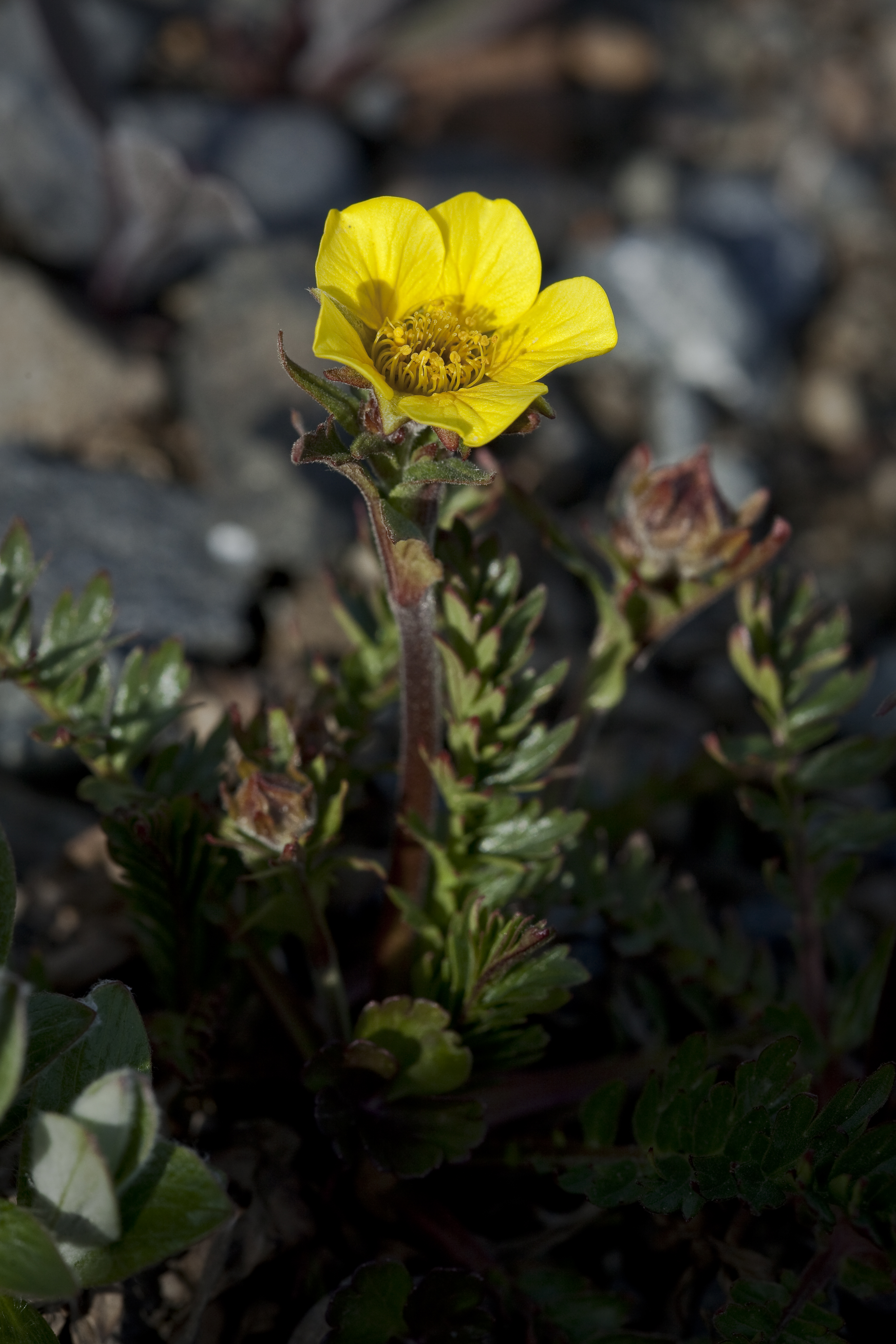

Conservation status
- Secure (NatureServe)

Scientific classification
- Kingdom: Plantae
- Clade: Tracheophytes
- Clade: Angiosperms
- Clade: Eudicots
- Clade: Rosids
- Order: Rosales
- Family: Rosaceae
- Genus: Geum
- Species: G. rossii

Binomial name
- Geum rossii (R.Br.) Ser.

= Geum rossii =

Species of flowering plant

Geum rossii is a species of flowering plant in the rose family known by the common names Ross' avens and alpine avens. It is native to North America where its distribution spans northern Canada and the high mountains of the western United States. It grows at high-latitude and high-elevation habitat, including the Arctic and in alpine climates. There are three varieties. One, var. depressum, is endemic to Washington in the United States, where it is limited to the Wenatchee Mountains.

The plants' flowers are similar in appearance to those of species in the Potentilla (or cinquefoil) genus. Geum rossii has less flowers per stem and leaves which are somewhat fernlike.
