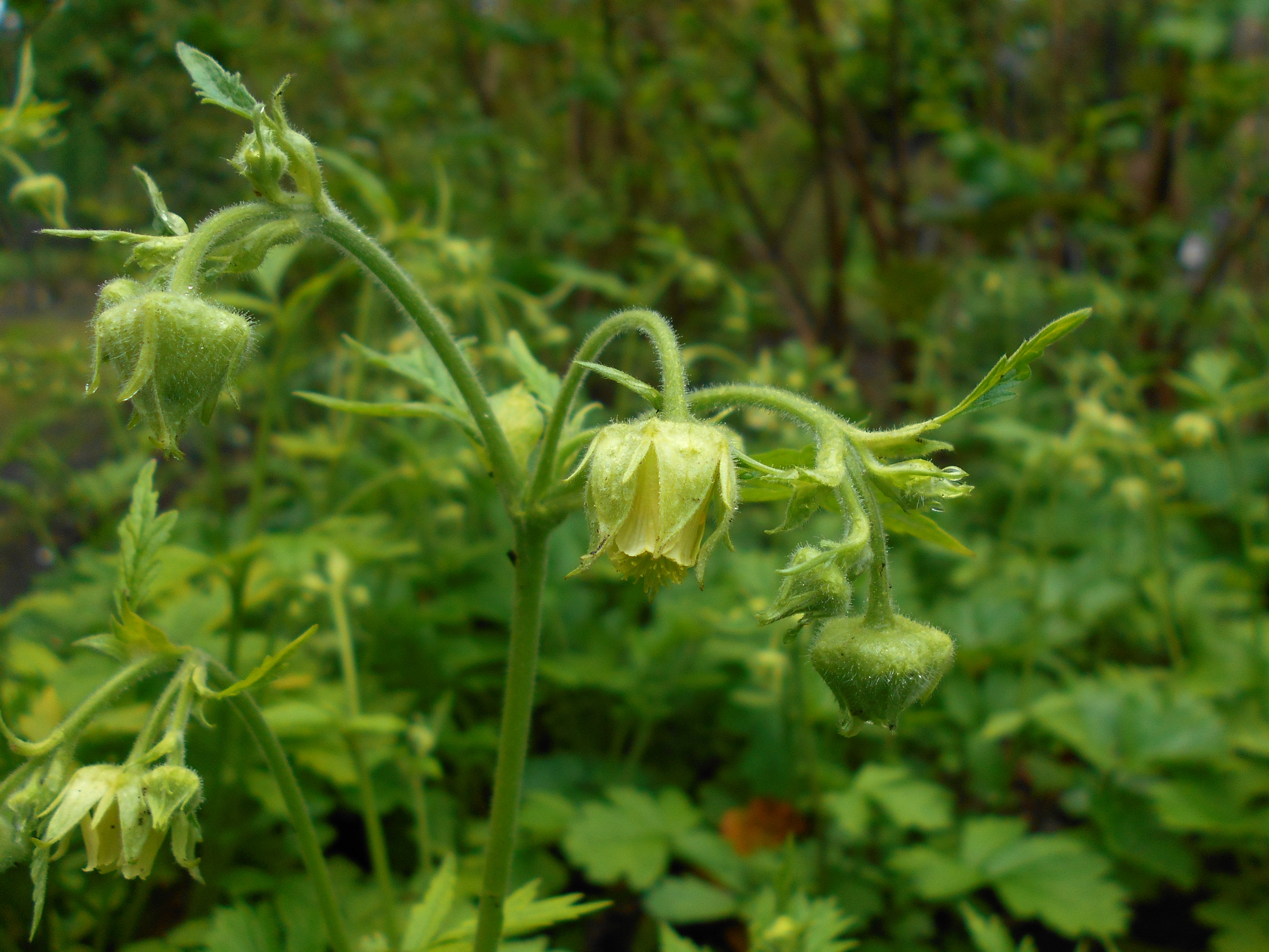
- Geum bulgaricum near the Seven Rila Lakes, Bulgaria

Scientific classification
- Kingdom: Plantae
- Clade: Tracheophytes
- Clade: Angiosperms
- Clade: Eudicots
- Clade: Rosids
- Order: Rosales
- Family: Rosaceae
- Genus: Geum
- Species: G. bulgaricum

Binomial name
- Geum bulgaricum Pancic

Synonyms
- Oreogeum bulgaricum (Pančić) E.I.Golubk.; Parageum bulgaricum (Pančić) M.Kr l; Sieversia bulgarica (Pančić) Nyman

= Geum bulgaricum =

Species of plant

Geum bulgaricum is a species of flowering plant of the genus Geum (avens) in the family Rosaceae. A perennial herbaceous plant, it has small, bell-like yellow flowers, and is native to a few mountains on the Balkan Peninsula.

It is found throughout the range of the Accursed Mountains that span the borders between Albania, Montenegro and Kosovo, in the mountain of Kunora e Lurës in eastern Albania, on Sinjajevina and Žijovo/Kučke Planine in Montenegro, the mountains of Prenj, Čvrsnica and Čabulja in southern Bosnia and Herzegovina, and in Bulgaria's Rila mountain.

It grows in the alpine and subalpine zones (typically at elevations between 1800 and 2600 m, but it can go as low as 1200 m in the Accursed Mountains and up to 2700 m in Rila). Its habitat ranges across mountain meadows, rocky slopes, and scree fields, and it can also be encountered among krummholz pine vegetation. It is associated with silicate rocks in Rila, and with carbonates in the western part of the range.

The bell-like flowers are nodding (rather than erect), similarly to Geum rivale, from which it is distinguished by the colour of the petals (pale yellow rather than yellow to purple), the colour of the sepals (pale greenish yellow rather than maroon), the size of the petals (more likely to be a little bit longer than the sepals), and the structure of the fruit style (simple rather than jointed).

Classified as "least concern" by the IUCN in 2011, it is mentioned in the red book of Albania (2007), included in the red list of Bosnia and Herzegovina, and has protected status in Bulgaria, Montenegro and Serbia.
