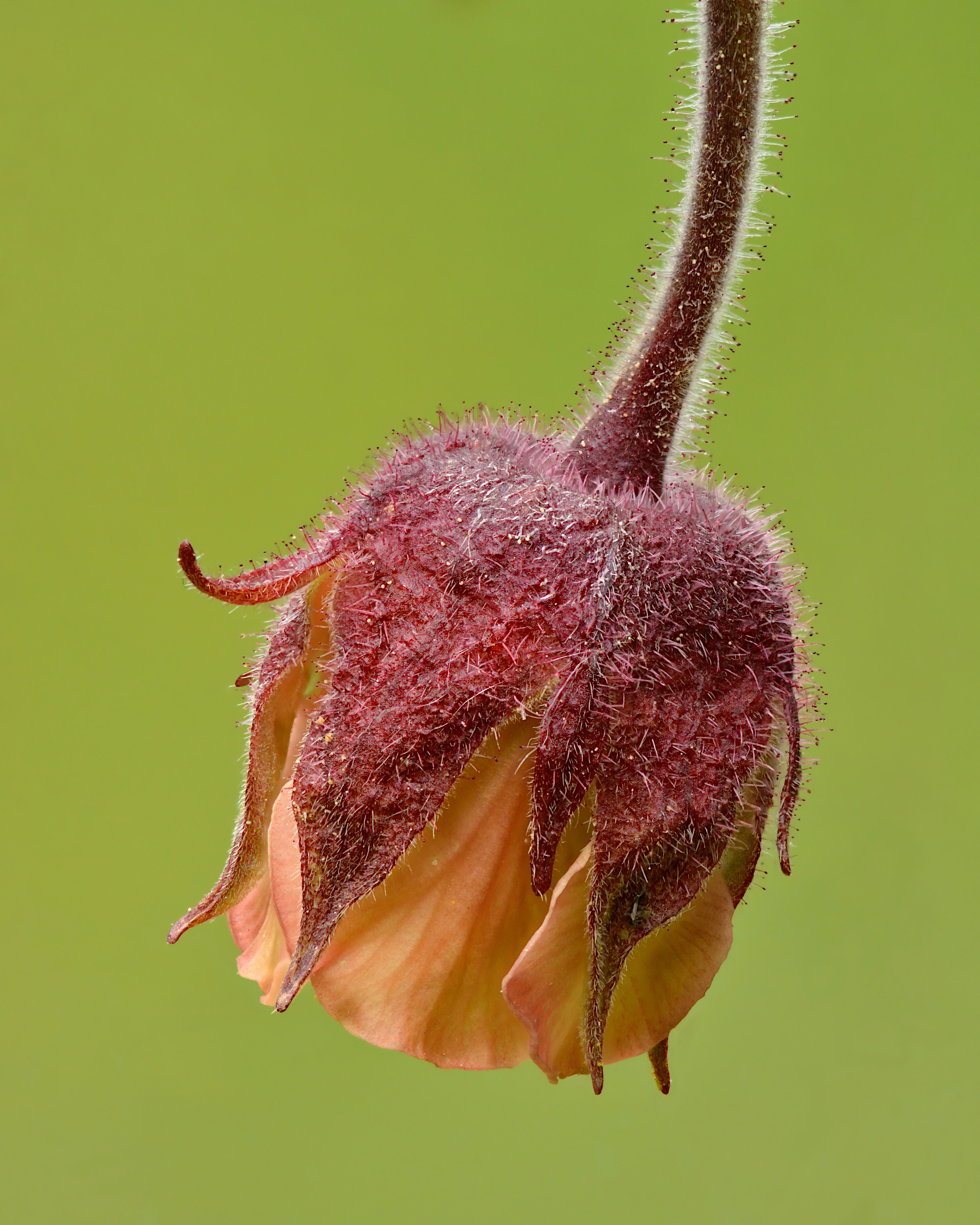

Conservation status
- Least Concern (IUCN 3.1)

- Secure (NatureServe)

Scientific classification
- Kingdom: Plantae
- Clade: Tracheophytes
- Clade: Angiosperms
- Clade: Eudicots
- Clade: Rosids
- Order: Rosales
- Family: Rosaceae
- Genus: Geum
- Species: G. rivale

Binomial name
- Geum rivale L.

= Geum rivale =

Species of flowering plant

Geum rivale, the water avens, is a flowering plant in the genus Geum within the family Rosaceae. Other names of the plant are nodding avens, drooping avens, cure-all, water flower and Indian chocolate. It is native to the temperate regions of Europe, Central Asia and parts of North America, where it is known as the purple avens. It grows in bogs and damp meadows, and produces nodding red flowers from May to September.

== Distribution ==
Geum rivale is widespread in Europe, particularly in the northern and central parts. It is found throughout the British Isles, the Faroes, Iceland, Scandinavia, the Baltic States, and much of Central Europe (up to elevations of 2,400 m (7,870 ft) in the Alps and 2,100 m (6,890 ft) in the Carpathians). It is absent from the Pannonian Basin and western France; on the Italian Peninsula, it is found in scattered locations in the northern and central Apennines, while on the Iberian Peninsula it is restricted between 1,000 and 2,200 m (3,280 and 7,220 ft) in the Cantabrians, Pyrenees, the Iberian and Central Systems, and the mountains of Sierra Nevada and Sierra de Cazorla in the south. It is found in the mountains of the Balkan Peninsula (in Bulgaria its altitudinal range is 1,200–2,100 m (3,940–6,890 ft)), the Caucasus, northern Anatolia and north-western Iran. It is also native to northern Ukraine and the central and northern parts of European Russia, Western Siberia up to the Sayan–Angara region in the east, as well as parts of Central Asia (the Dzungaria and the Tarbagatai areas and Tian Shan).

Geum rivale is also native to a broad region in Canada and the United States.

== Habitat ==
The plant is a native perennial of slow-draining or wet soils and can tolerate mildly acidic to calcareous conditions in full sun or under partial shade. Habitats include stream sides, pond edges, damp deciduous woodland and hay meadows.

It is a component of purple moor grass and rush pastures is a type of Biodiversity Action Plan habitat in the UK. It occurs on poorly drained neutral and acidic soils of the lowlands and upland fringe. It is found throughout the British Isles with the exception of south-east England, the Western Isles of Scotland and parts of the midlands and the west country.

== Ecology ==
Geum rivale is pollinated primarily by bees, and less often by flies and beetles. As the flower matures, elongation of the stamens ensures it self-fertilises if not already cross-pollinated. The flowers' stigmas mature before the stamens. It begins flowering a little earlier than G. urbanum, so early pollinations are within the gene-pool of the single species. The seeds of Water Avens are burr-like, and are distributed after being caught in the coats of rabbits and other small mammals, and by rhizomal growth.

Geum rivale is parasitised by Podosphaera aphanis – a conidial powdery mildew. Yellow spots on the living leaf may be caused by Peronospora gei – a downy mildew.

== Hybrids ==
Geum urbanum hybridises fairly regularly with Geum rivale as they are closely related and occur together.

In North America it is known to hybridise with Geum aleppicum (the hybrid being named Geum × aurantiacum Fries ex Scheutz), with Geum macrophyllum var. perincisum (as Geum × pervale), and with Geum macrophyllum var. macrophyllum (as Geum × pulchrum).

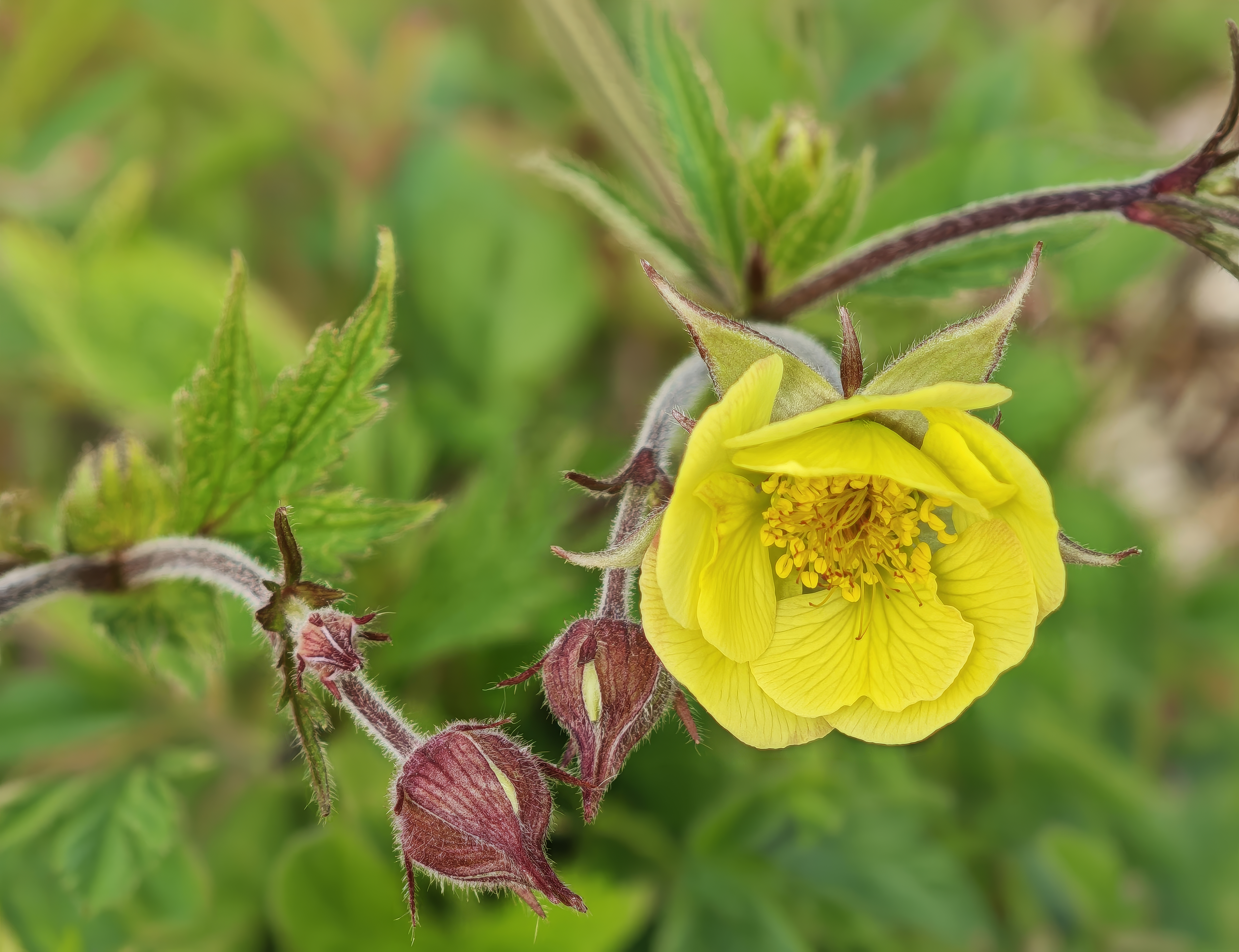
Flower and buds of a hybrid

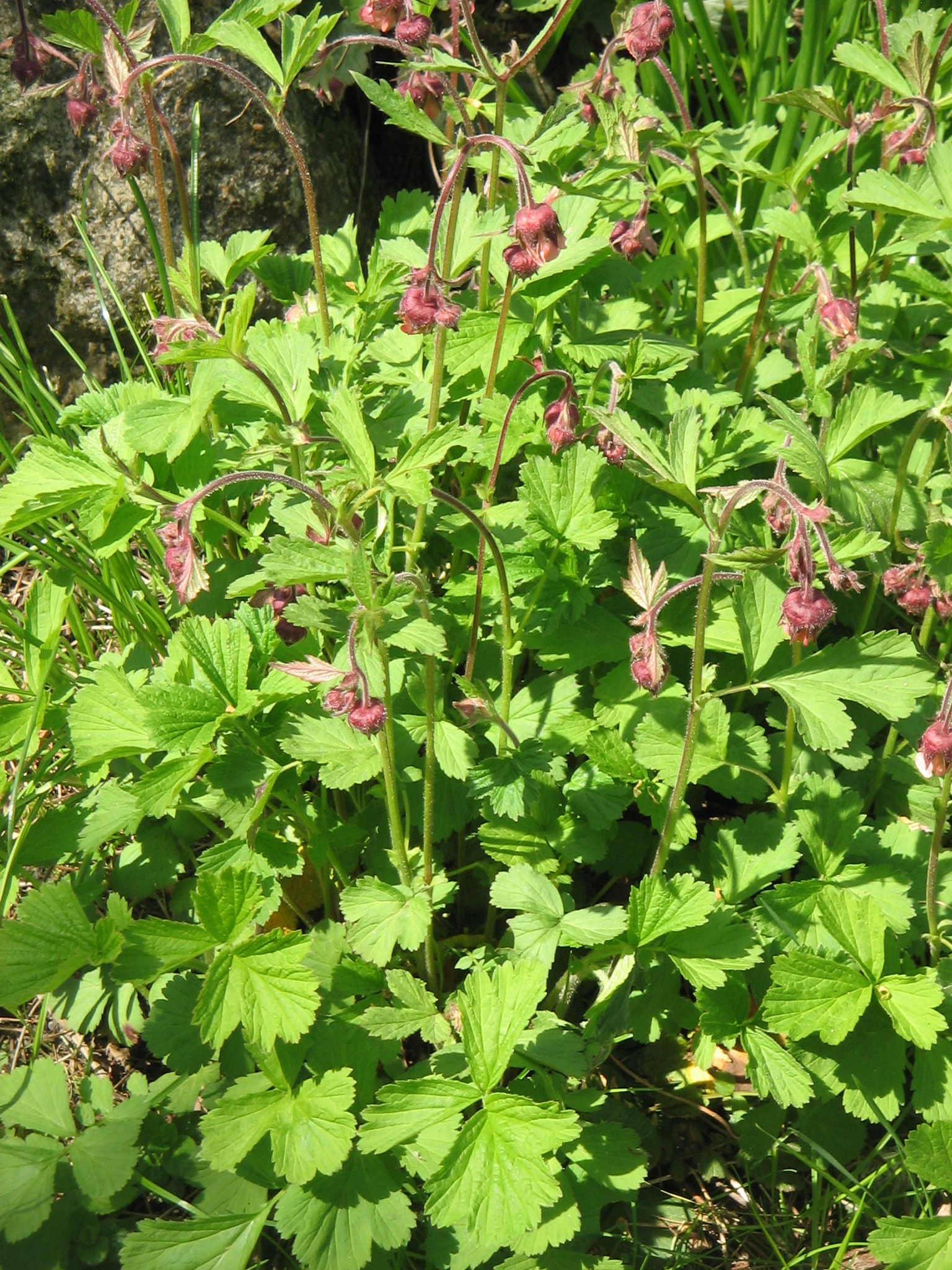
Group of plants

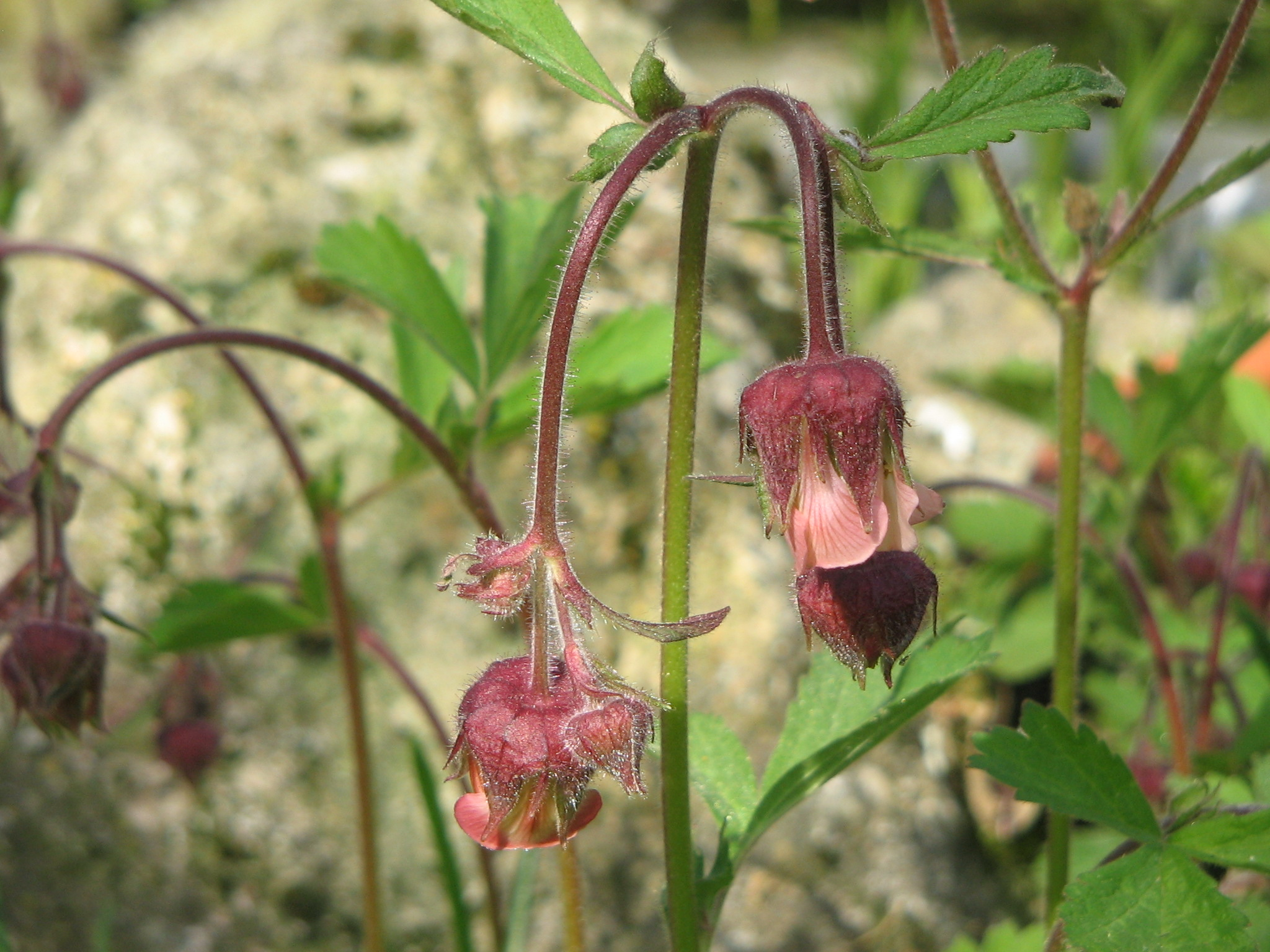
Flowers

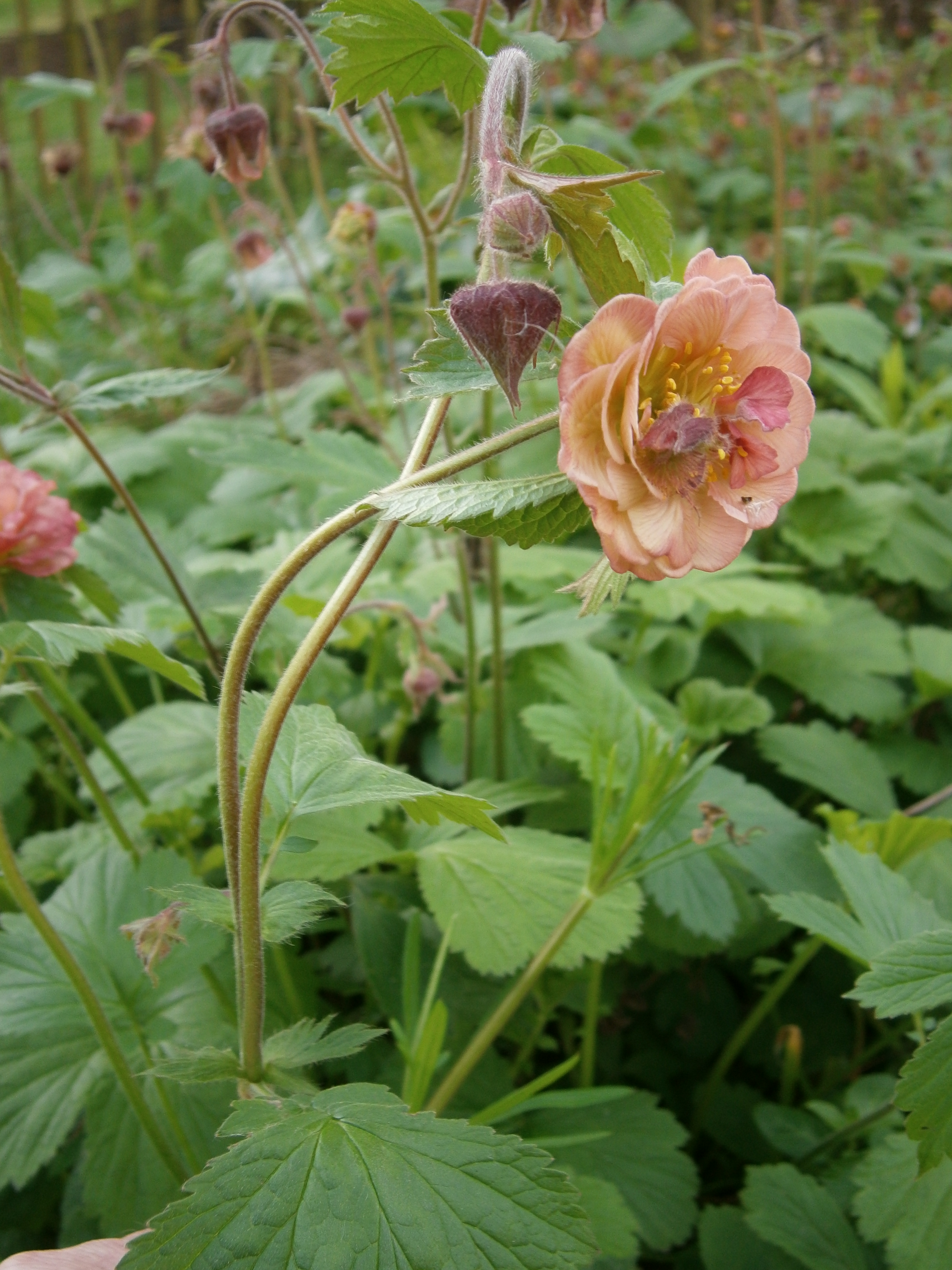
Pseudo-peloric flower

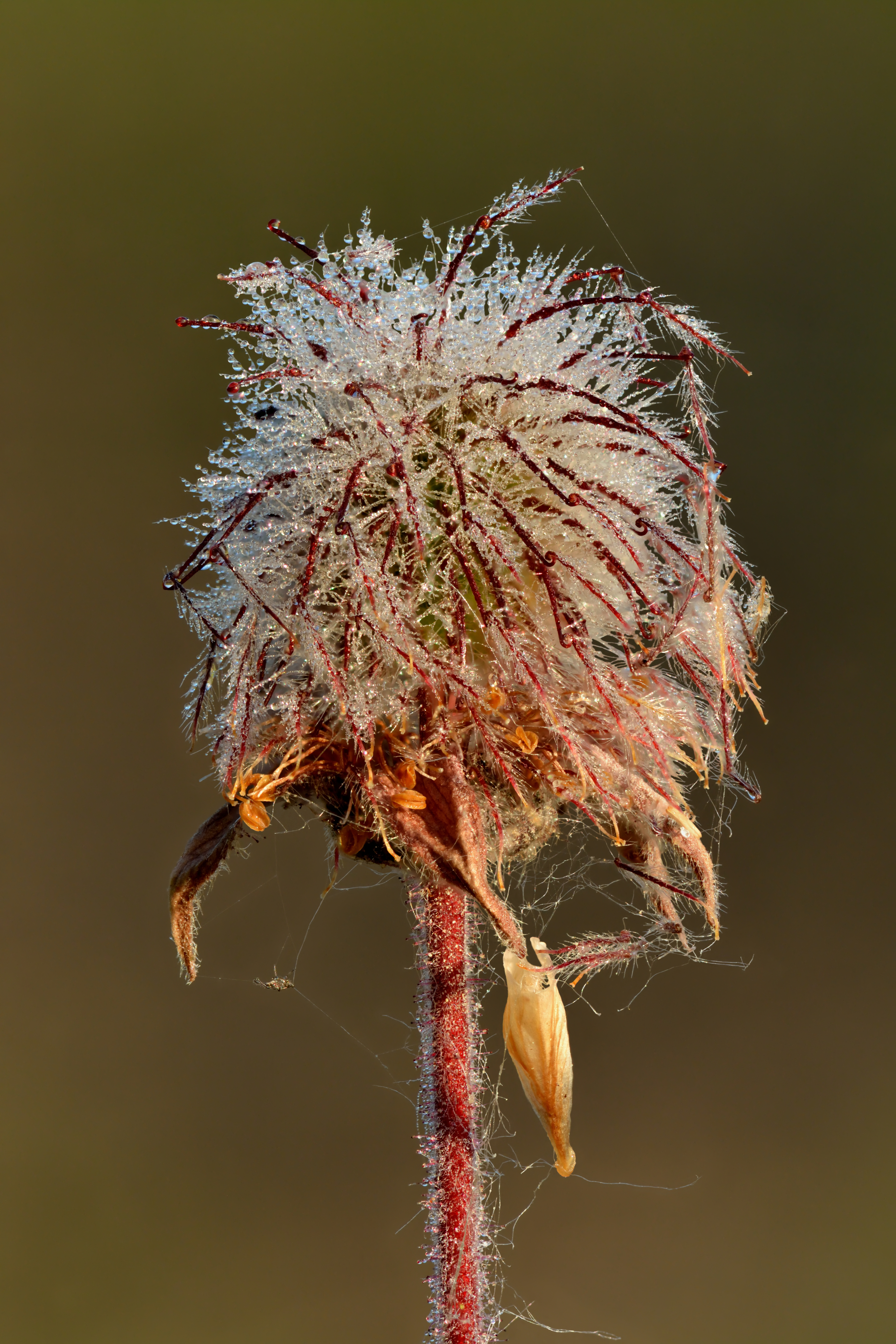
Fruits
