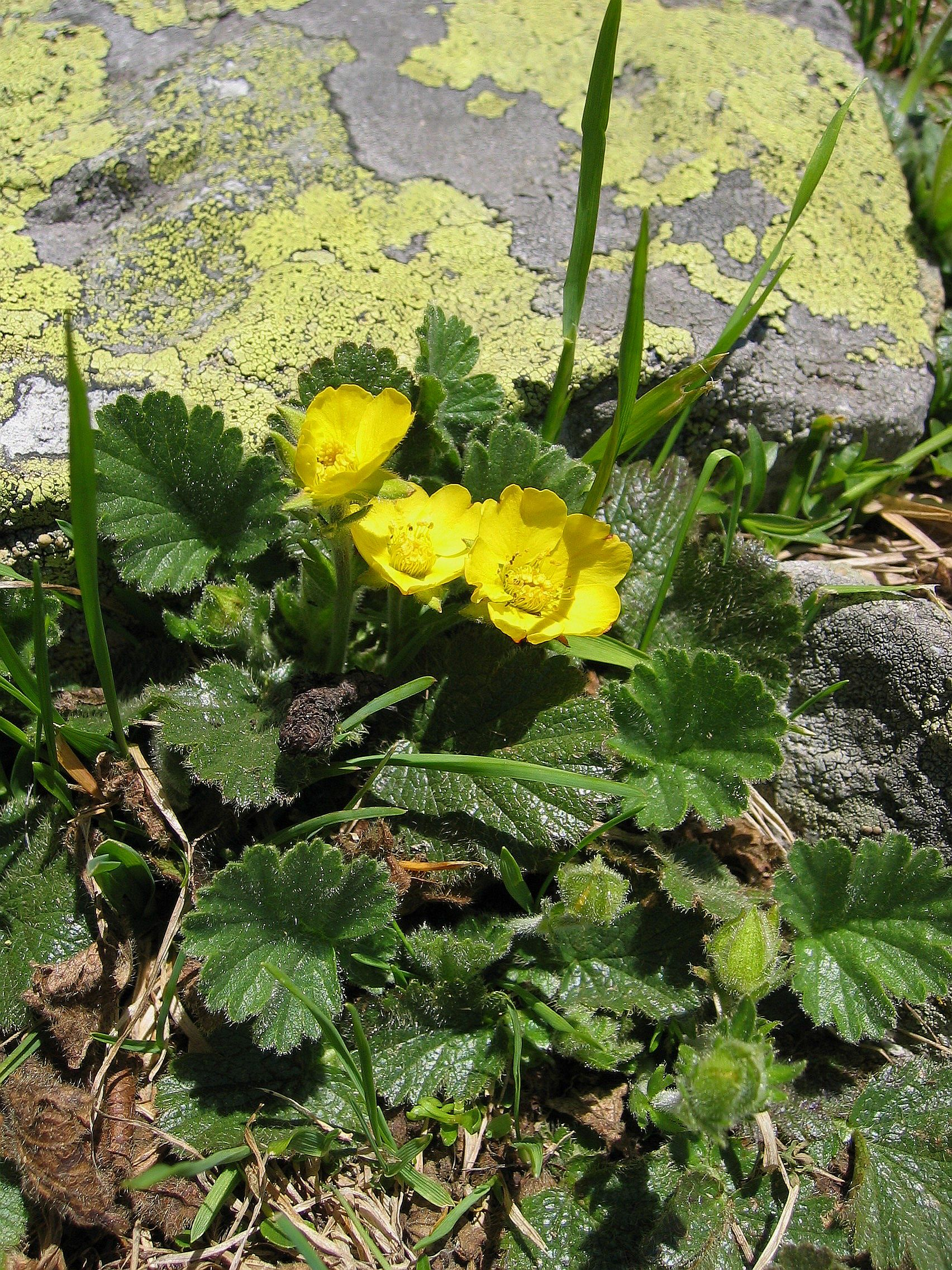

Scientific classification
- Kingdom: Plantae
- Clade: Tracheophytes
- Clade: Angiosperms
- Clade: Eudicots
- Clade: Rosids
- Order: Rosales
- Family: Rosaceae
- Genus: Geum
- Species: G. montanum

Binomial name
- Geum montanum L.

= Geum montanum =

Species of flowering plant

Geum montanum, the Alpine avens, is a species of flowering plant of the genus Geum in the Rosaceae family, native to the mountains of central and southern Europe.

== Distribution ==
Geum montanum is widespread in the Alps, typically at elevations in the range 1430–2300 m (though it occurs at as low as 700 m in Centovalli and as high as 3500 m in Monte Rosa). It is found in the Pyrenees, the Cantabrians, the Massif Central, the Black Forest, the Sudetes (1300–1400 m), throughout the Carpathians (900–2500 m in the Tatras), in the north of the Apennines, on the island of Corsica, and on the Balkan Peninsula: in the mountains of Bosnia and Herzegovina, Montenegro, North Macedonia, Albania, Kosovo (specifically in Žljeb and Accursed Mountains), northernmost Greece (2000–2500 m in Varnous, Kajmakčalan and Tzena), in the east of Serbia (Suva Planina) and the west of Bulgaria (at elevations of 1600–2700 m in western and central Stara Planina, Sredna Gora, Vitosha, Osogovo, Rila, Pirin, Slavyanka and the western Rhodopes).

== Uses ==
In cultivation in the UK, Geum montanum has gained the Royal Horticultural Society's Award of Garden Merit.

Geum montanum roots have been used in the traditional Austrian medicine internally as tea for treatment of rheumatism, gout, infections, and fever.
