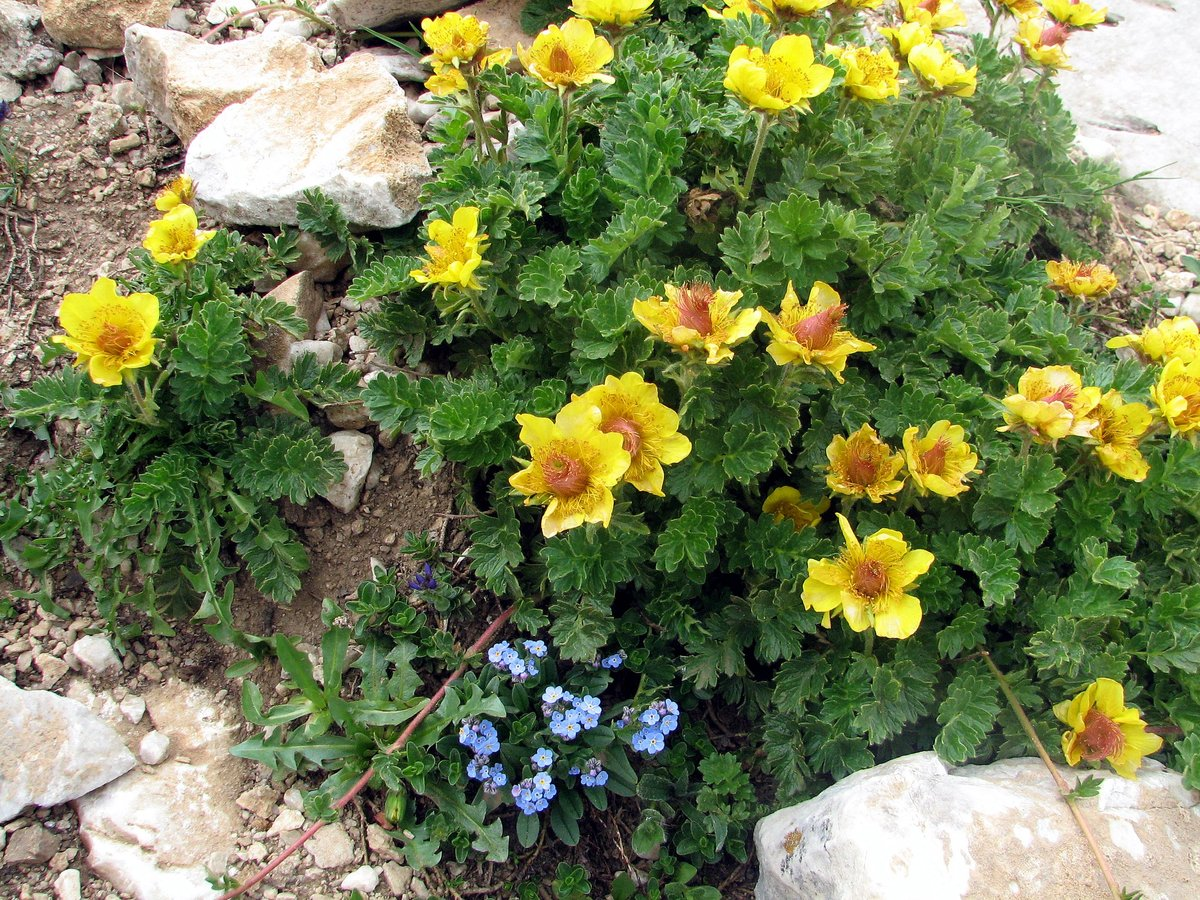
- In bloom

Scientific classification
- Kingdom: Plantae
- Clade: Tracheophytes
- Clade: Angiosperms
- Clade: Eudicots
- Clade: Rosids
- Order: Rosales
- Family: Rosaceae
- Genus: Geum
- Species: G. reptans

Binomial name
- Geum reptans L.

Synonyms
- Adamsia reptans Fisch. & Steud.; Caryophyllata reptans (L.) Lam.; Novosieversia reptans (L.) E.I.Golubk.; Parageum reptans (L.) M.Král; Sieversia reptans (L.) Spreng.

= Geum reptans =

Species of flowering plant

Geum reptans, the creeping avens, is a species of flowering plant in the genus Geum of the family Rosaceae native to some mountains of Central and Southeastern Europe. A long-lived perennial that reproduces both sexually and clonally, it has high phenotypic variation, but these variable traits do not appear to be adaptations to local conditions.

== Distribution ==
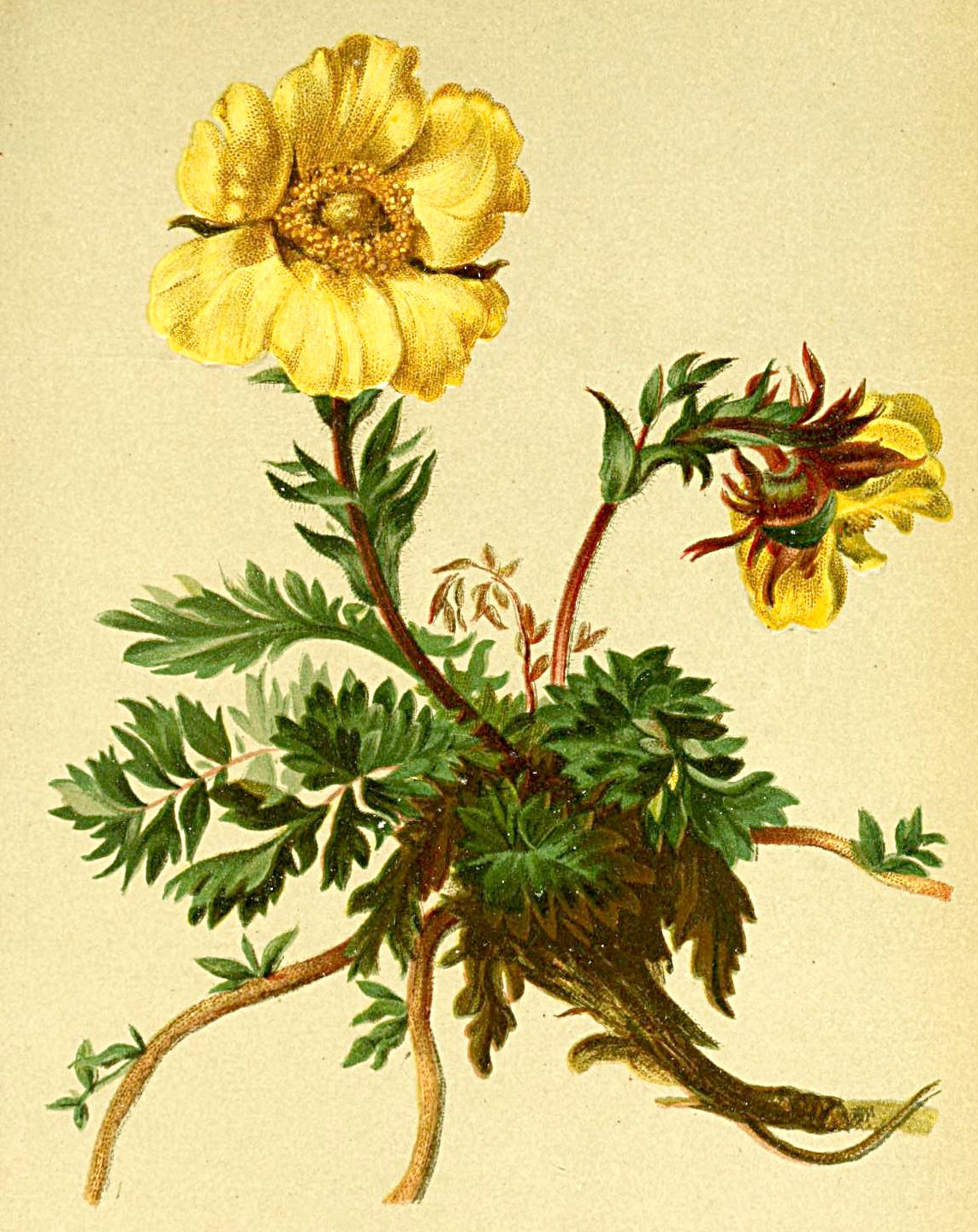
Botanical illustration

It grows in rock cracks, on moraines, in moist scree fields and atop mountain summits. It is widespread in the Alps, where it is typically found at elevations of 2,100–2,800 m (6,900–9,200 ft), though its altitudinal range varies: from 1,900 to 2,500 m (6,200 to 8,200 ft) in the Maritime Alps to as high as 3,800 m (12,500 ft) in the Graian Alps. It grows less extensively in the Black Forest of Germany, in some parts of the Carpathians (in the Tatras at elevations of 1440–2540 m), in the Rila and Pirin mountains of Bulgaria (at altitudes of 2300–2900 m), and in the Pindus, Korab, and Shar mountains of the Western Balkans.
