= Geum macrophyllum =

Large-Leaved Avens

Conservation status
- Secure (NatureServe)

Scientific classification
- Kingdom: Plantae
- Clade: Tracheophytes
- Clade: Angiosperms
- Clade: Eudicots
- Clade: Rosids
- Order: Rosales
- Family: Rosaceae
- Genus: Geum
- Species: G. macrophyllum

Binomial name
- Geum macrophyllum Willd.

Varieties
- G. m. var. macrophyllum; G. m. var. perincisum

Species of flowering plant

Geum macrophyllum, commonly known as largeleaf avens or large-leaved avens, is a perennial flowering plant native to Kamchatka, northern and central Japan, and North America, where it occurs from the Arctic south through the northern United States, extending along the Rocky Mountains to the Sierra Nevadas of California and as far south as Northwestern Mexico.

It is even more distinctive in fruit than in flower, with spiky spheres of reddish styles. The fruits are a ball of tiny velcro like hooks that catch on clothing and animal hair.

== Description ==
Geum macrophyllum is a perennial herb in the rose family (Rosaceae) characterized by a basal rosette of long-stalked, pinnately compound leaves with several toothed leaflets and an upright flowering stem arising from a short rhizome. The stem is typically slender and somewhat hairy, bearing smaller, less divided leaves higher up and ending in a loose cluster of small yellow, five-petaled flowers with numerous stamens and separate pistils. After flowering, it produces a distinctive spherical aggregate of achene fruits, each with a long, hooked style that aids in dispersal by attaching to animals.

Leaf

Flowers and developing fruits close-up

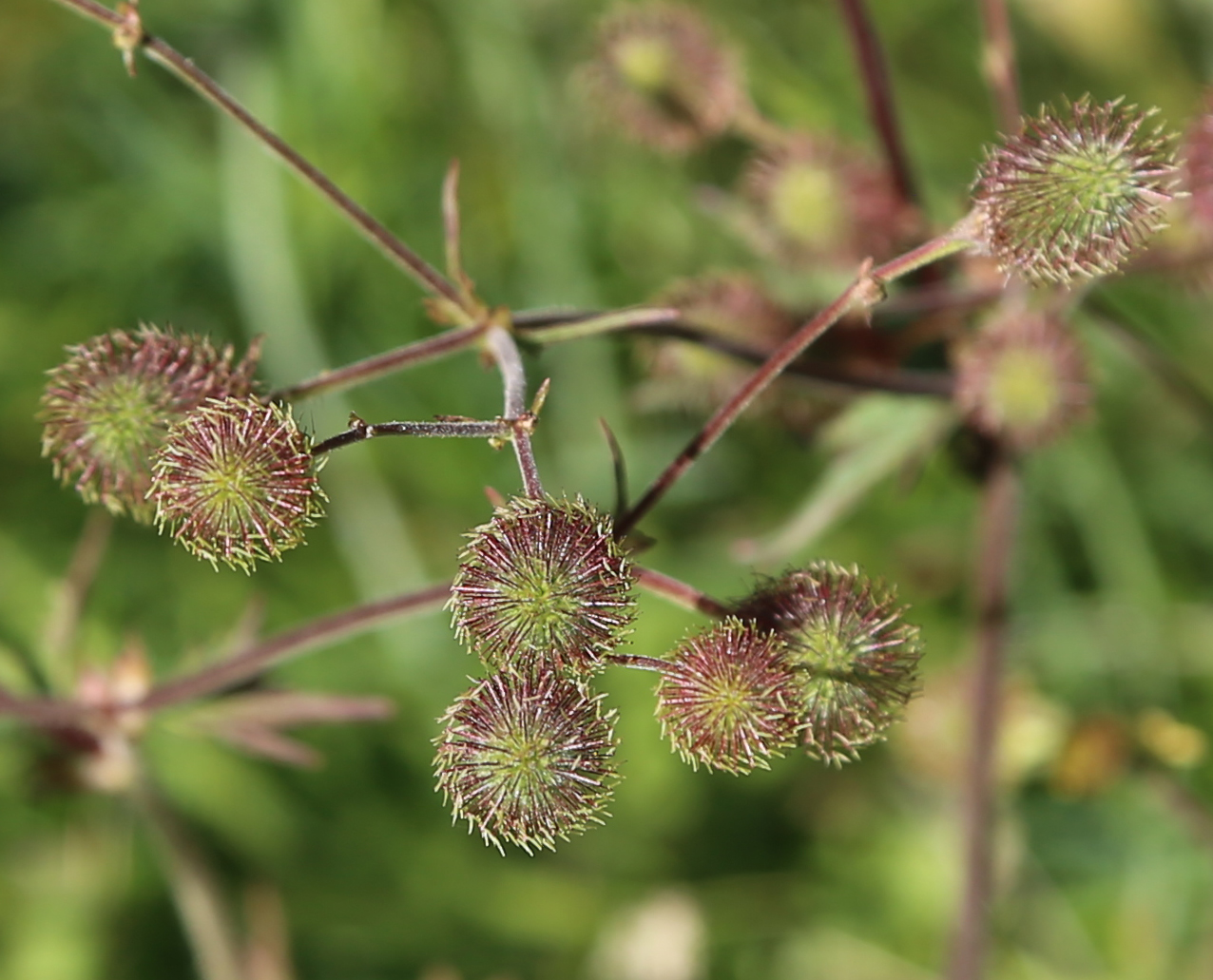
Geum macrophyllum in fruit

== Uses ==
The Squamish make a diuretic tea out of the leaves. The Haida make a steam bath with boiled roots to treat rheumatic pain. Some tribes use the plant in eyewashes, to treat stomach ailments, and to aid childbirth.

== Genome ==
The plant's chloroplast genome was published in 2021. The genome is 155,940 base pairs long and contains 129 genes involved in photosynthesis and other basic cell functions. Its structure is similar to that of most flowering plants, with large and small single-copy regions separated by two repeated sections. Genetic analysis showed that G. macrophyllum is closely related to Geum triflorum within the Rosaceae family.

== Gallery ==
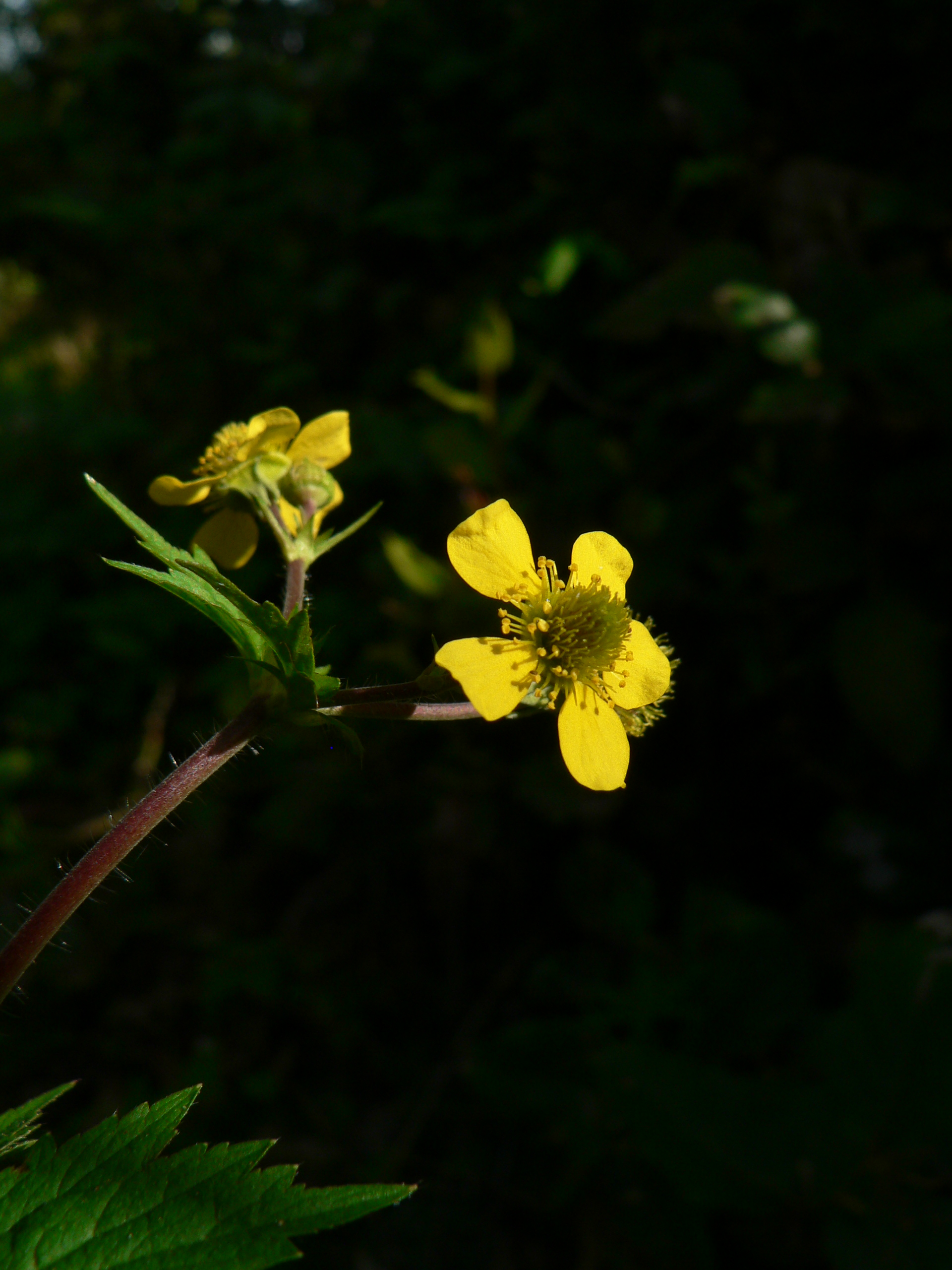
Flower

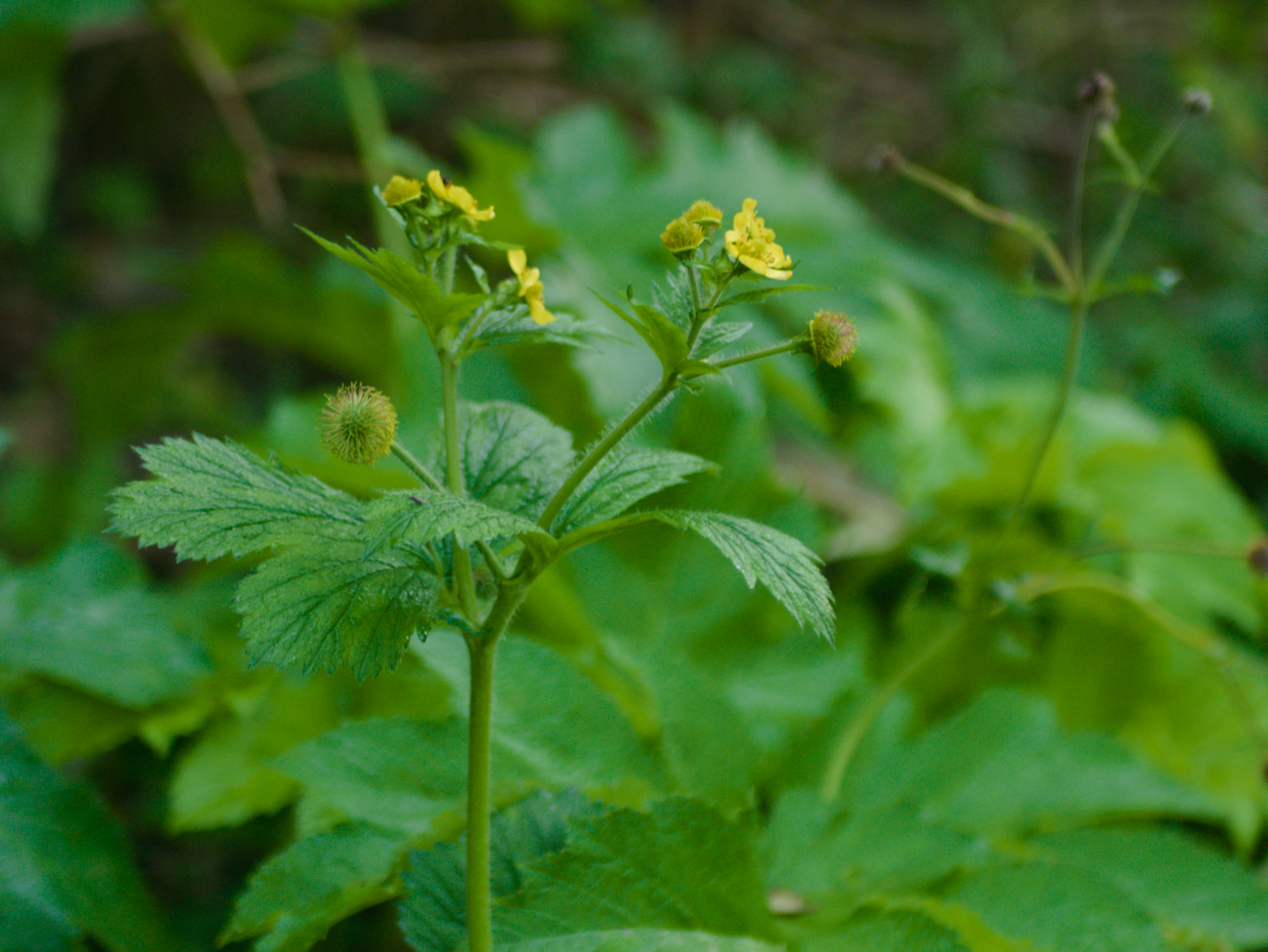
The flowers and fruit of Geum macrophyllum
