= Bur =

Seed or dry fruit or infructescence that has hooks or teeth

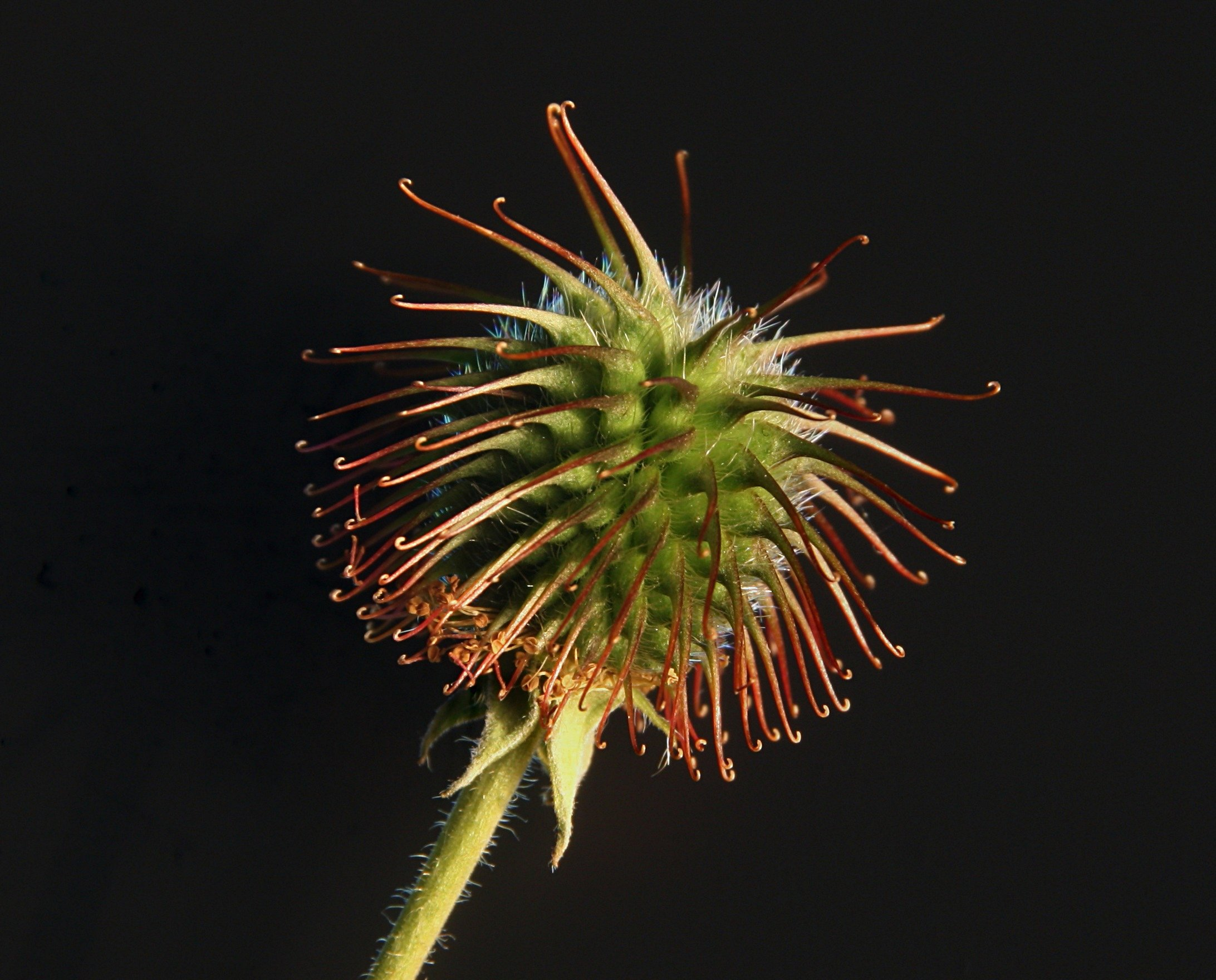
Geum bur

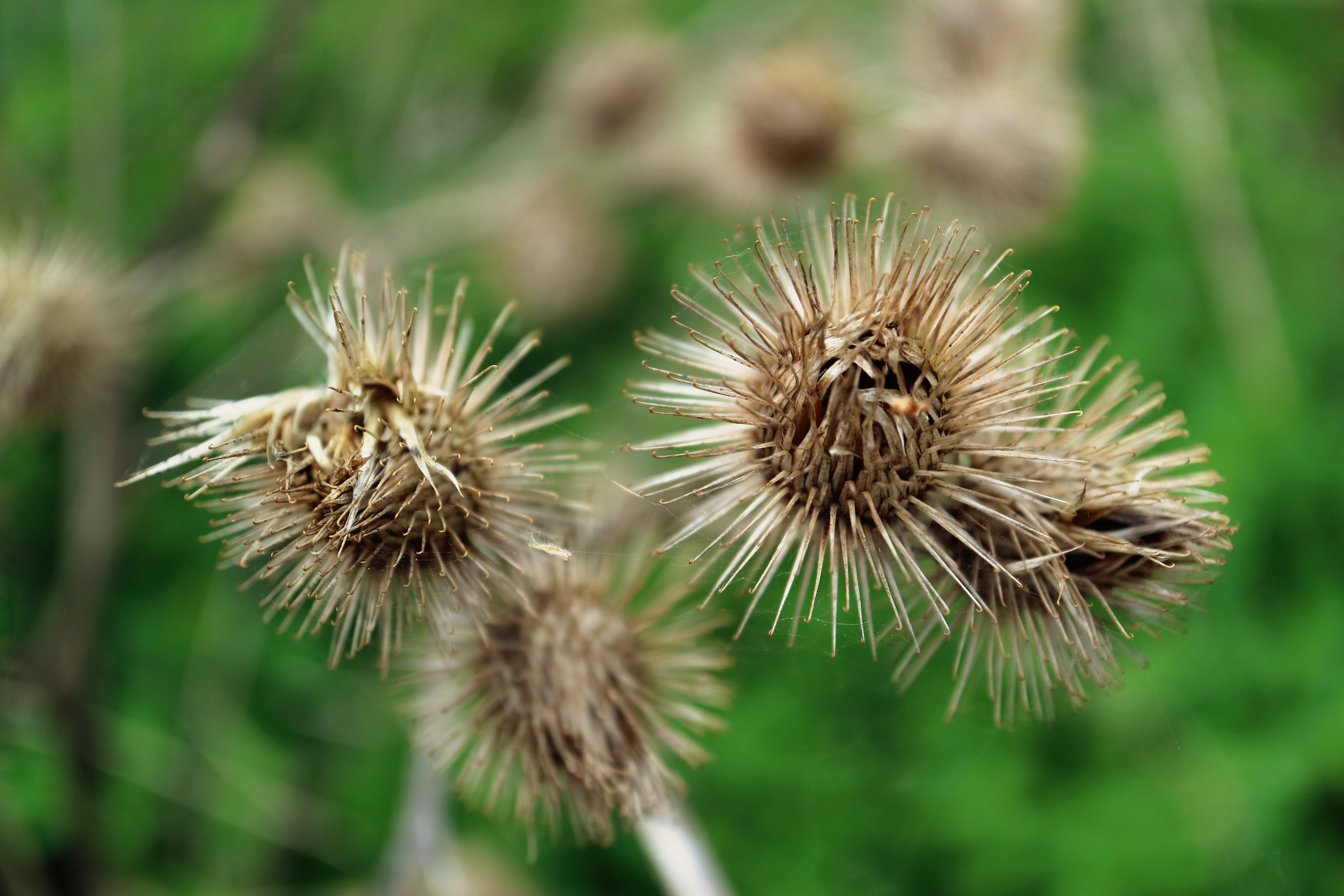
Hooked burs of Arctium (burdock)

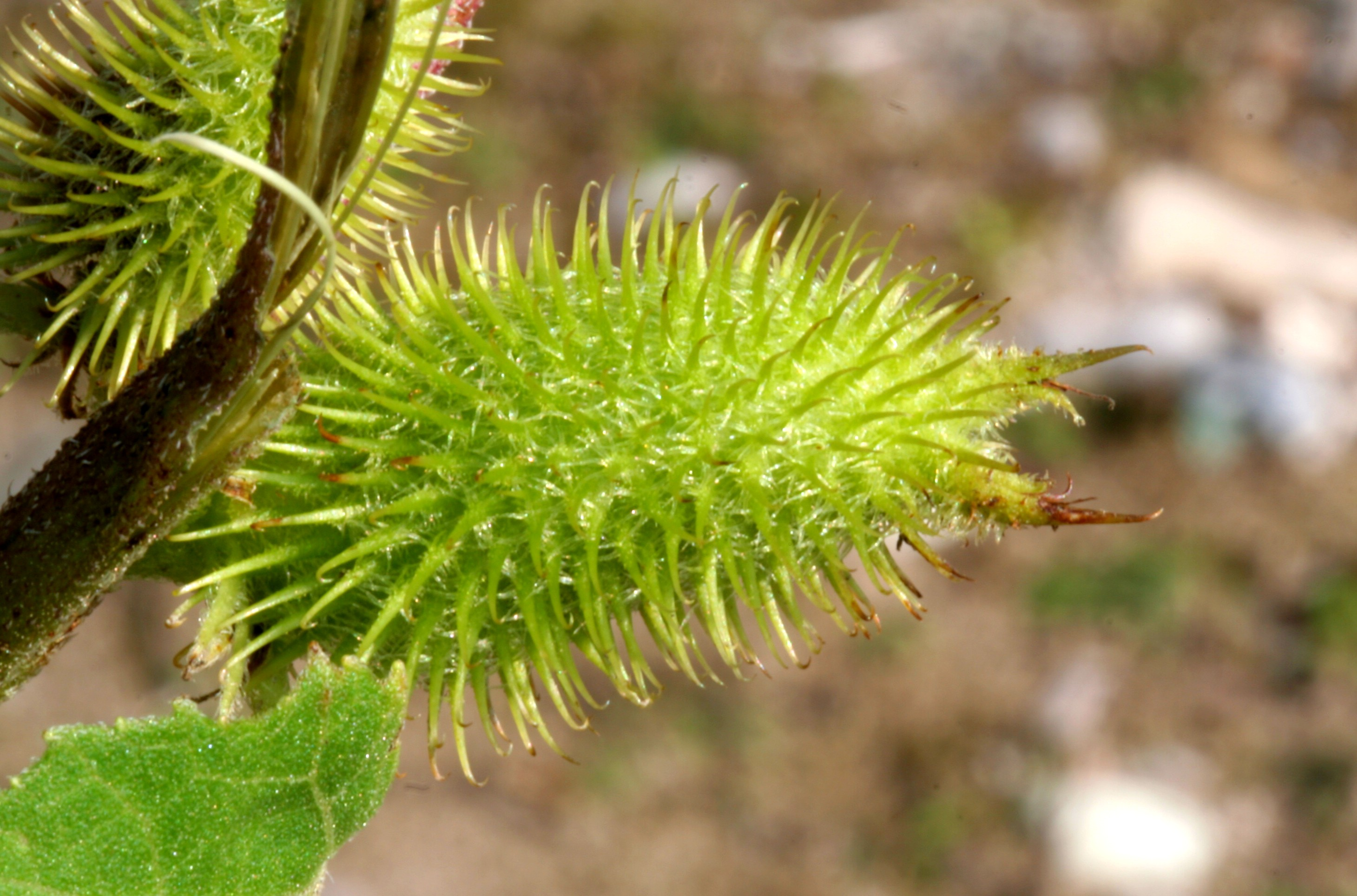
Xanthium bur

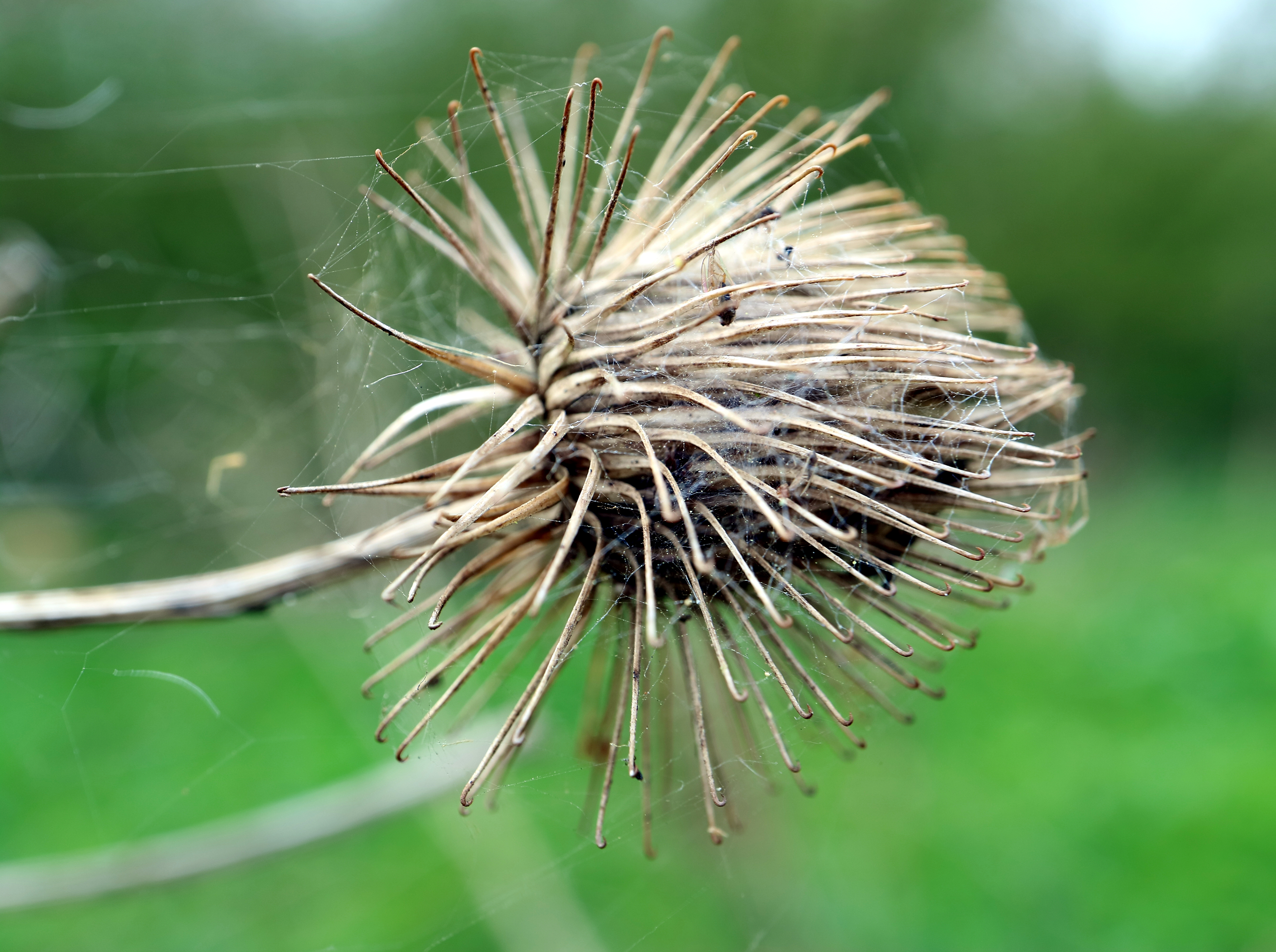
Close-up of a single Arctium bur

A bur (also spelled burr) is a seed, dry fruit or infructescence that has hooks or teeth. The main function of the bur is to spread the seeds of the bur plant, often through epizoochory. The hooks of the bur are used to latch onto skin or fabric, enabling the bur – which contain seeds – to be transported to another location for dispersal. Another use for the spines and hooks is physical protection against herbivores. Their ability to stick to animals and fabrics has shaped their reputation as bothersome.

Some other forms of diaspores, such as the stems of certain species of cactus, also are covered with thorns and may function as burs.

Bur-bearing plants, such as Tribulus terrestris and Xanthium species, are often single-stemmed when growing in dense groups, but branch and spread when growing singly. The number of burs per fruit along with the size and shape can vary largely between different bur plants.

== Function ==
Containing seeds, burs spread through catching on the fur of passing animals (epizoochory) or machinery as well as by being transported together with water, gravel and grain. The hooks or teeth generally irritate, and some species commonly cause gross injury to animals, or expensive damage to clothing or to vehicle tires.

Burs serve the plants that bear them in two main ways.

- Firstly, burs are spinescent and tend to repel some herbivores, much as other spines and prickles do.
- Secondly, plants with burs rely largely on living agents to disperse their seeds; their burs are mechanisms of seed dispersal by epizoochory (dispersal by attaching to the outside of animals).

Spinescent plants repel herbivores mechanically by wounding the herbivore's mouth or digestive system. Moreover, burs' mechanical defence can work alongside the color of the bur that can visually warn off herbivores.

Most epizoochorous burs attach to hair on the body or legs of the host animal, but a special class of epizoochorous bur is known as the trample-bur (or trample-burr). Several species of Tribulus, Harpagophytum, and Grielum produce fruit in the form of trample-burs. As the name suggests, they attach themselves to the animal when trampled. They may hook onto the legs of animals as the large hooks of Harpagophytum do, sometimes causing serious injury, but sometimes hooking onto the leg of say, an ostrich, apparently without causing discomfort. It also might penetrate a hoof or foot pad or the tires of a vehicle, only to be shed after being carried for a considerable time and distance; most Tribulus and Grielum species are specialised for such attachment, variously being flat, but with upward-directed spikes as in say, Grielum humifusum, or shaped like a caltrop as in some species of Tribulus that have achieved the status of cosmopolitan weeds by sticking to the tires of aircraft.

The bur must be able to easily detach from the plant and easily attach to for example the fur of an animal. The ability to spread the seeds depends both on the number of burs that manage to get attached and on the force of attachment. The hook span of the bur has been shown to have a large influence on the contact separation force. Some studies have also shown that the force can increase with the size of the bur, although not all large burs have a high contact separation force. Furthermore, the flexibility of the bur may also influence this force which can increase with stiffness.

== Relevance to humans ==
Burs are best known as sources of irritation, injury to animals, damage to clothing, punctures to tires, and clogging equipment such as agricultural harvesting machinery. Furthermore, because of their ability to compete with crops over moisture and nutrition, bur plants can be labelled as weeds and therefore also be subject to removal. Methods of controlling the spread of bur plants include the use of herbicides, slashing and cultivation among others.

Some have however been used for such purposes as fabric fulling, for which the fuller's teasel is a traditional resource.

The bur of burdock was the inspiration for hook and loop fastener, also known as Velcro.

== Common plants with burs ==
Common bur-bearing plants include:

- Acanthospermum australe (Paraguayan starburr)
- Agrimonia pubescens (soft agrimony)
- Anthriscus caucalis (burr chervil)
- Arctium lappa (greater burdock)
- Bidens pilosa (beggar ticks)
- Cenchrus longispinus (longspine sandbur)
- Circaea lutetiana (enchanter's nightshade)
- Daucus carota (Queen Anne's lace)
- Hylodesmum glutinosum (pointed tick-trefoil)
- Galium aparine (cleavers)
- Geum aleppicum (yellow avens)
- Geum canadense (white avens)
- Geum urbanum (herb bennet)
- Osmorhiza claytonii (Clayton's sweetroot)
- Phryma leptostachya (American lopseed)
- Tribulus terrestris (puncturevine)
- Xanthium strumarium (cocklebur)
