= Traditional Siberian medicine =

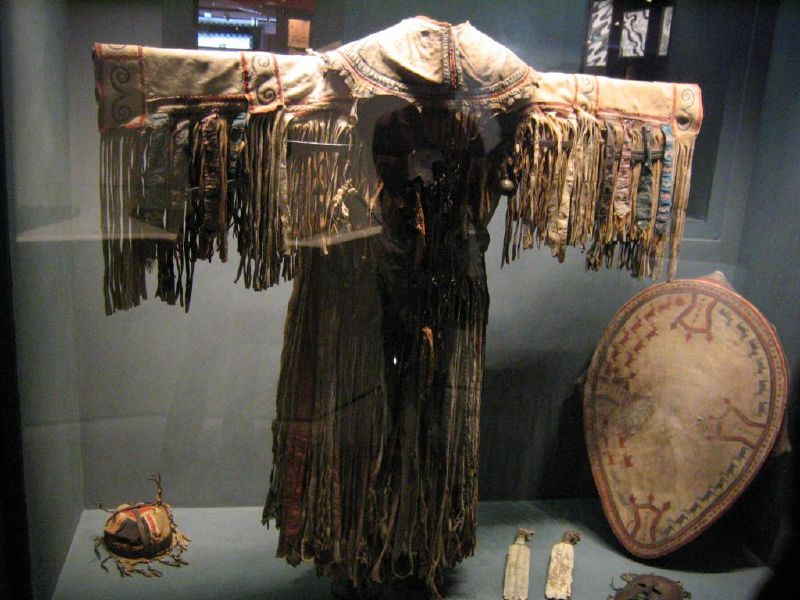
Traditional attire of an Evenki shaman

Traditional Siberian medicine revolves around many different methods of treatment for different conditions and ailments. Early forms of Siberian medicine included herbal and topical treatments that would be ingested in the forms of tea or pastes applied directly to the skin. Indigenous Siberian civilizations utilized the plants available in the land for healing purposes. These practices were often prescribed by Siberian shamans who were at the center of healing practices in most civilizations. Shamans also played an important role for healing Siberians through spiritual intervention by performing different rituals. These remedies and rituals were passed down generation to generation and evolved throughout the ages. Modern medical practices have since moved on from most of these methods since the creation of formalized medical care like hospitals in the region. In the modern day, Siberians and many Russians still drink these herbal teas out of tradition.

== Foundations of traditional Siberian medicine ==
Much of the history of traditional Siberian medicine comes from indigenous people who have passed down remedies to younger generations. Siberian medicine has also been blended into traditional Russian medicine. The main pillars involve the use of herbal remedies such as making pastes, teas, and juices in order to treat different ailments. Many different recipes call for the use of beets and different types of roots found in the native areas. This included plants like Siberian ginseng, Rhodiola Rosea, and Yellow Avens.

Another area of Siberian medicine is the usage of mushrooms and other psychoactive plants and fungi. A very popular mushroom amongst indigenous people is the fly agaric mushroom. This mushroom is noted for its red color with white dots present on the top of it. These mushrooms would be consumed or used in rituals performed by shamans. The shaman also played an important role in the foundation of traditional Siberian medicine.

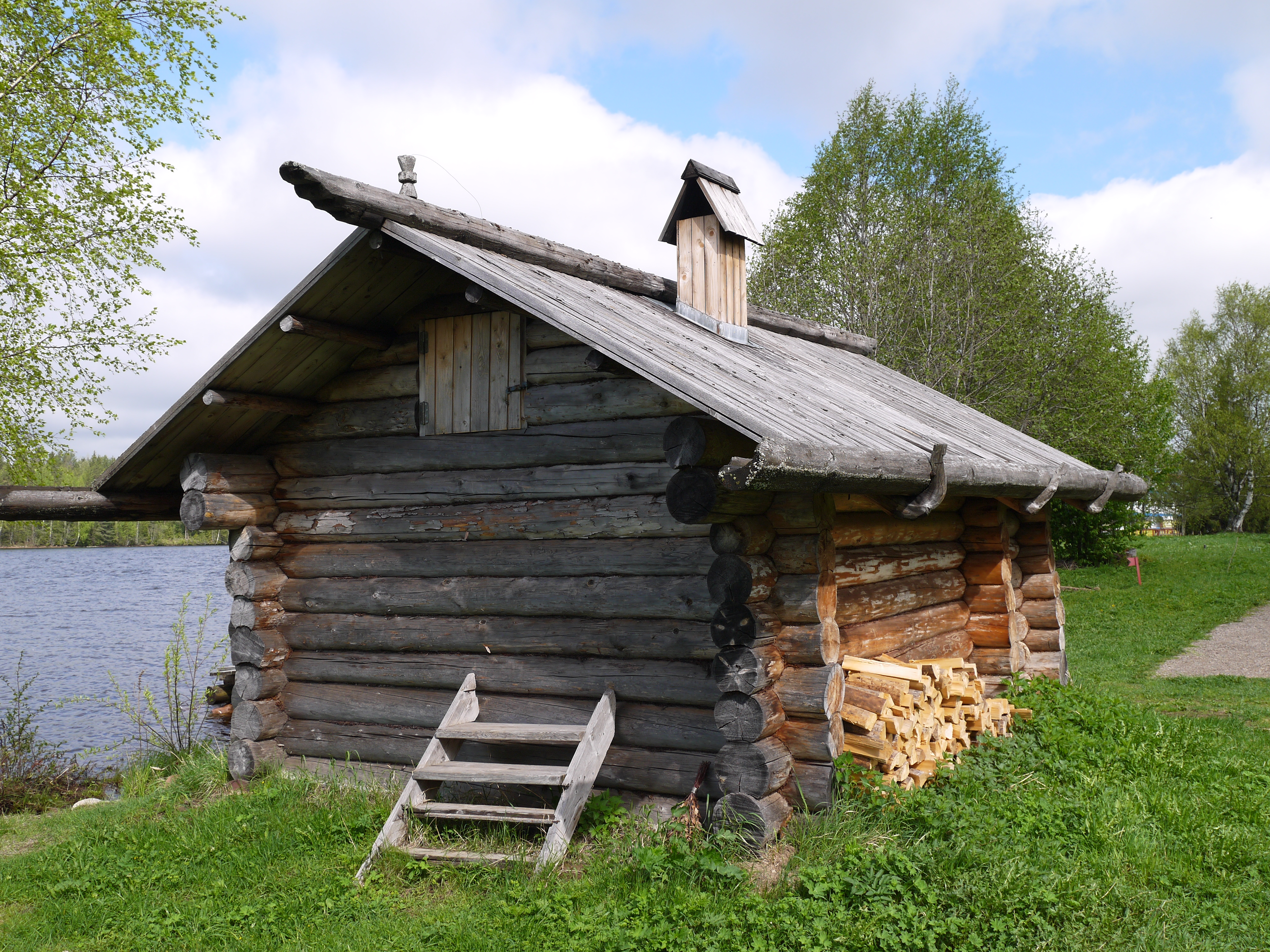
Traditional Russian Banya

Another pillar of traditional Siberian medicine involved the utilization of intense heat from springs or saunas and it is known as the Russian Banya. The banya was a type of sauna that was traditionally heated by wood fire. Russians and Siberians would sit in these saunas for prolonged periods of time before cooling off in the cold weather or partake in an ice bath. These methods were assumed to strengthen the immune system and speed muscle recovery. Many of these practices are still popular in modern day Russia. The natural emphasis of traditional Siberian medicine serves as a keystone pillar for most of the medicinal practices. Nature is heavily respected throughout the various indigenous peoples in Siberia and is heavily connected to the world of the spirits.

== Common plants used ==
Most of traditional Siberian medicine is based on herbal and plant medicine. Research efforts stemming from the 19th century sought to understand the diverse ecology of Siberian ecosystems along with the plants and their effects on humans. More specifically, in places such as Tomsk, scientists have focused on trying to gather collective lists of the plants and their benefits associated with traditional folk medicine. Many of the plants in the regions were utilized by locals to treat ailments. Scientists that were actively retracing the steps of the local people attempted to research the effects of these plants and if they were accurate to the stories told to them.

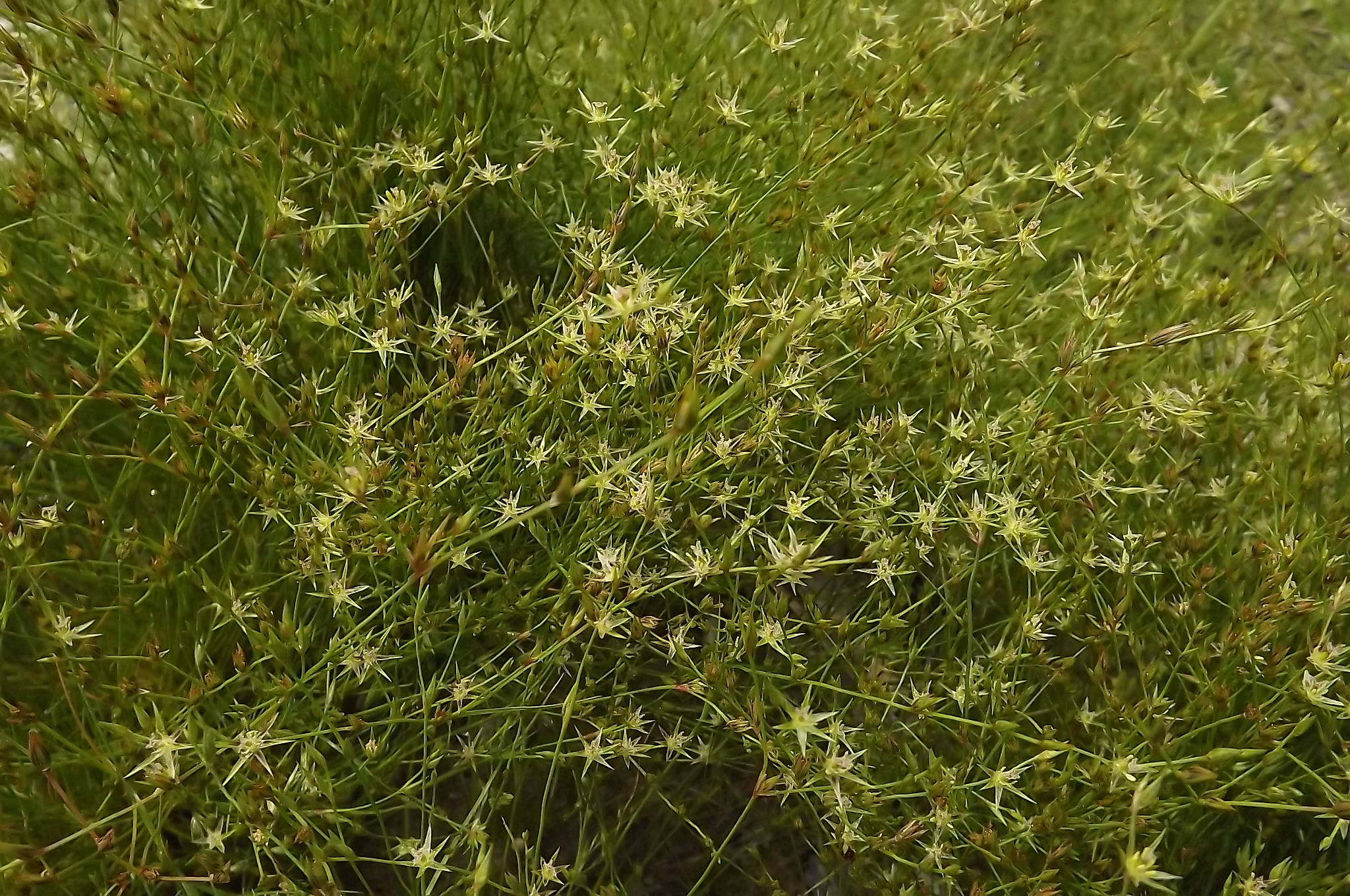
Juncus Bufonis

One such instance is in the case of Toad Rush. This plant was often used as a diuretic and a laxative for the people of the region. The plant is scientifically known as Juncus Bufonis and was also used in other folk medicine to induce vomiting and relieve stomach pain by causing a bowel movement. The plant is characterized as being small with a branched structure that grows alongside grass.

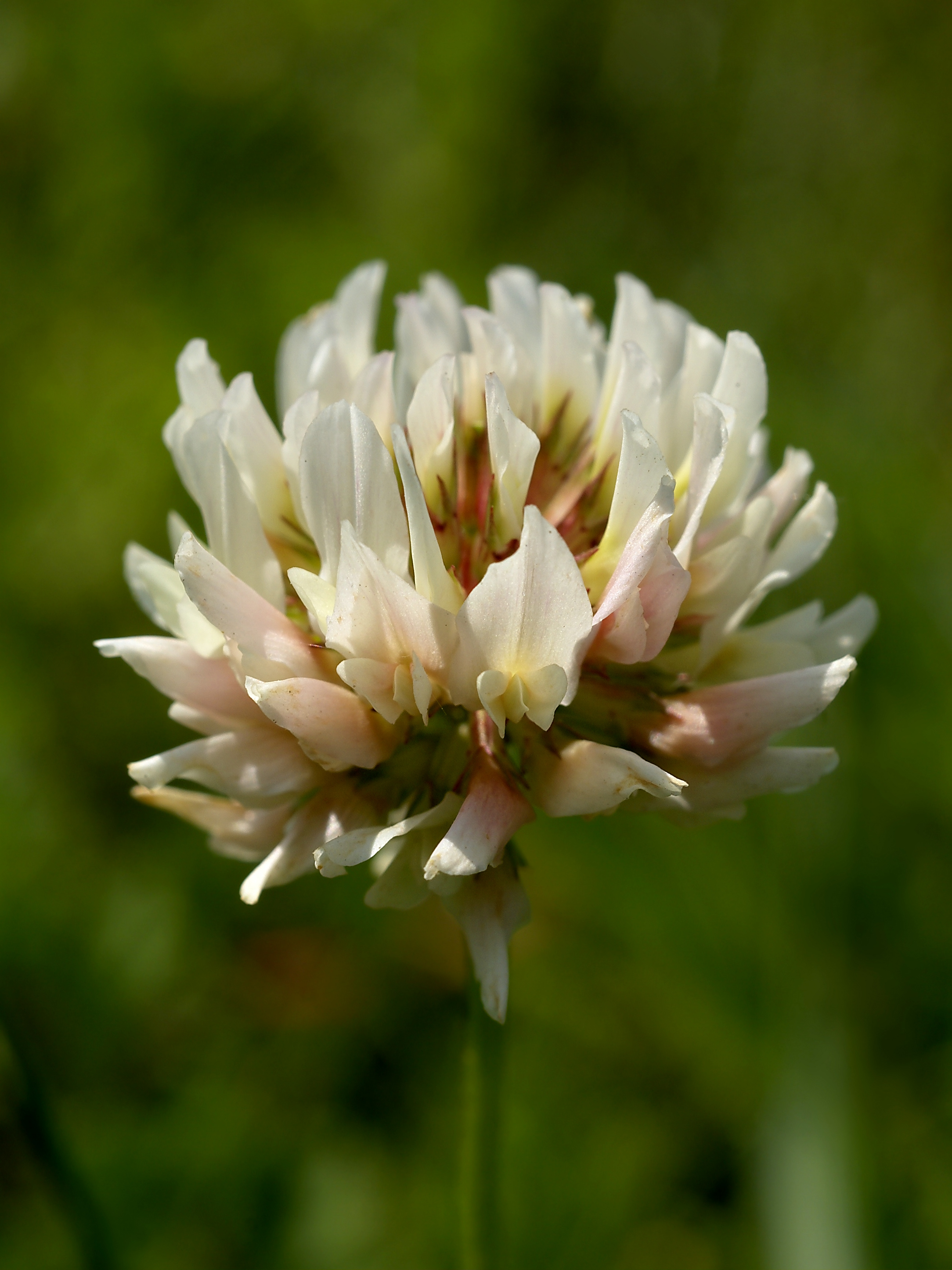
Tifolium Repens

Other species of plants were found and categorized based on their effects. Trifolium repens was used as a method to treat asthma related symptoms as well as being a general pain killer with antiseptic properties when applied to wounds. This plant is also referred to as the white clover and grows all around the planet in patches. Further research into this plant shows that it has been used around the world in traditional medicine for its antiseptic and analgesic properties. The plant was harvested and turned into pastes and other topical methods. It was then applied to wounds or ingested for its medicinal properties.

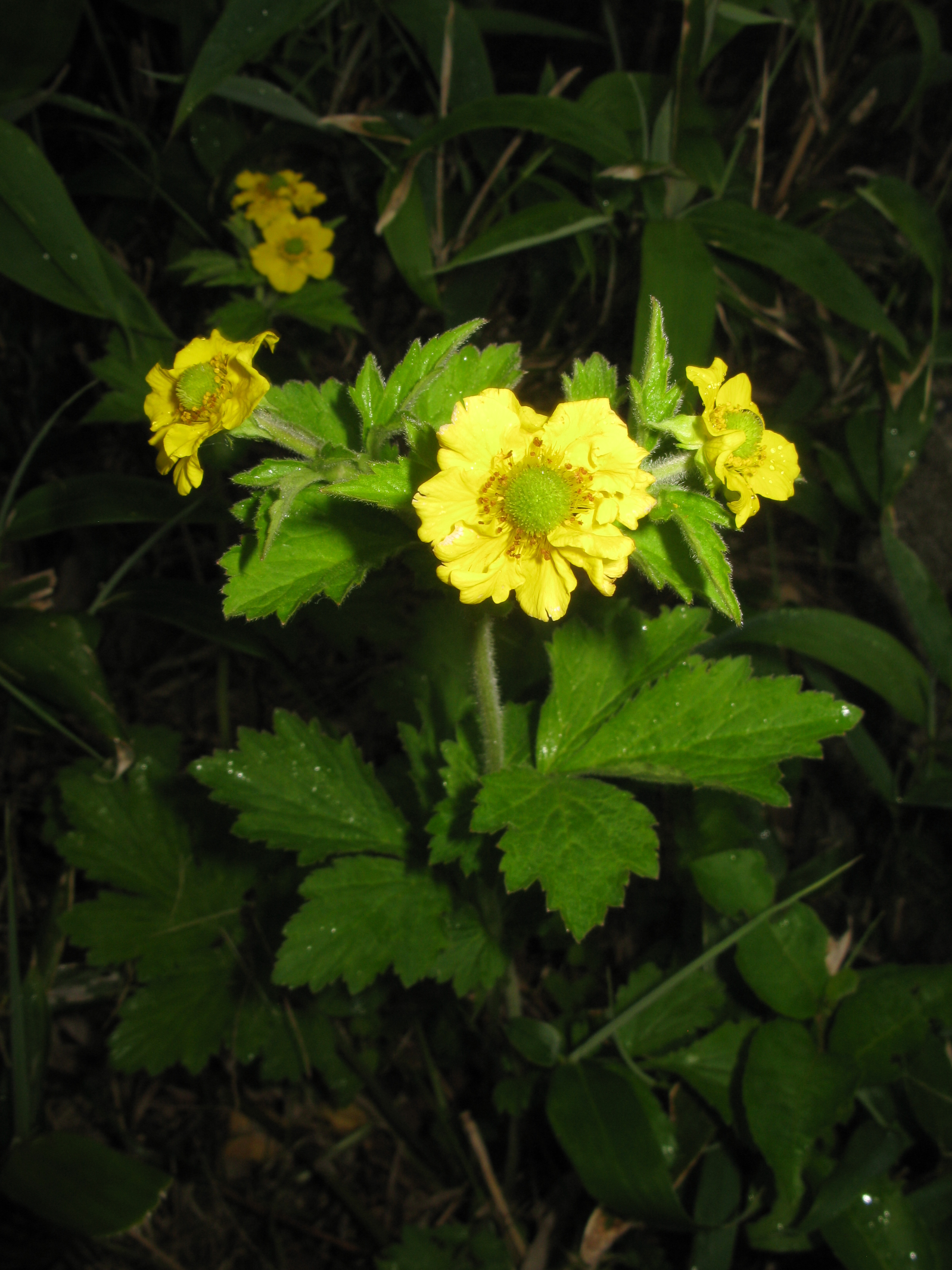
Geum Aleppicum

Common avens was used as a remedy for sore throats as well as an agent to treat general gastrointestinal issues. The plant is more commonly referred to as yellow avens and geum aleppicum. It is marked by the small yellow flower it produces when it blooms. This plant was harvested for its roots and used in teas to also treat diarrhea.

More popularized herbs from the past come in the form of adaptogenic plants such as the Siberian Ginseng plant and the Rhodiola plant. These plants have been turned to throughout history and into the modern day for their effects. These two plants were used in teas and pastes to treat many different ailments. In more recent times, these plants have been studied for their effects as adaptogens. Adaptogens impact the way the human body reacts under stressful and new conditions. Siberians in the past believed that these plants would keep them fit and increase their stamina while working in harsh conditions.

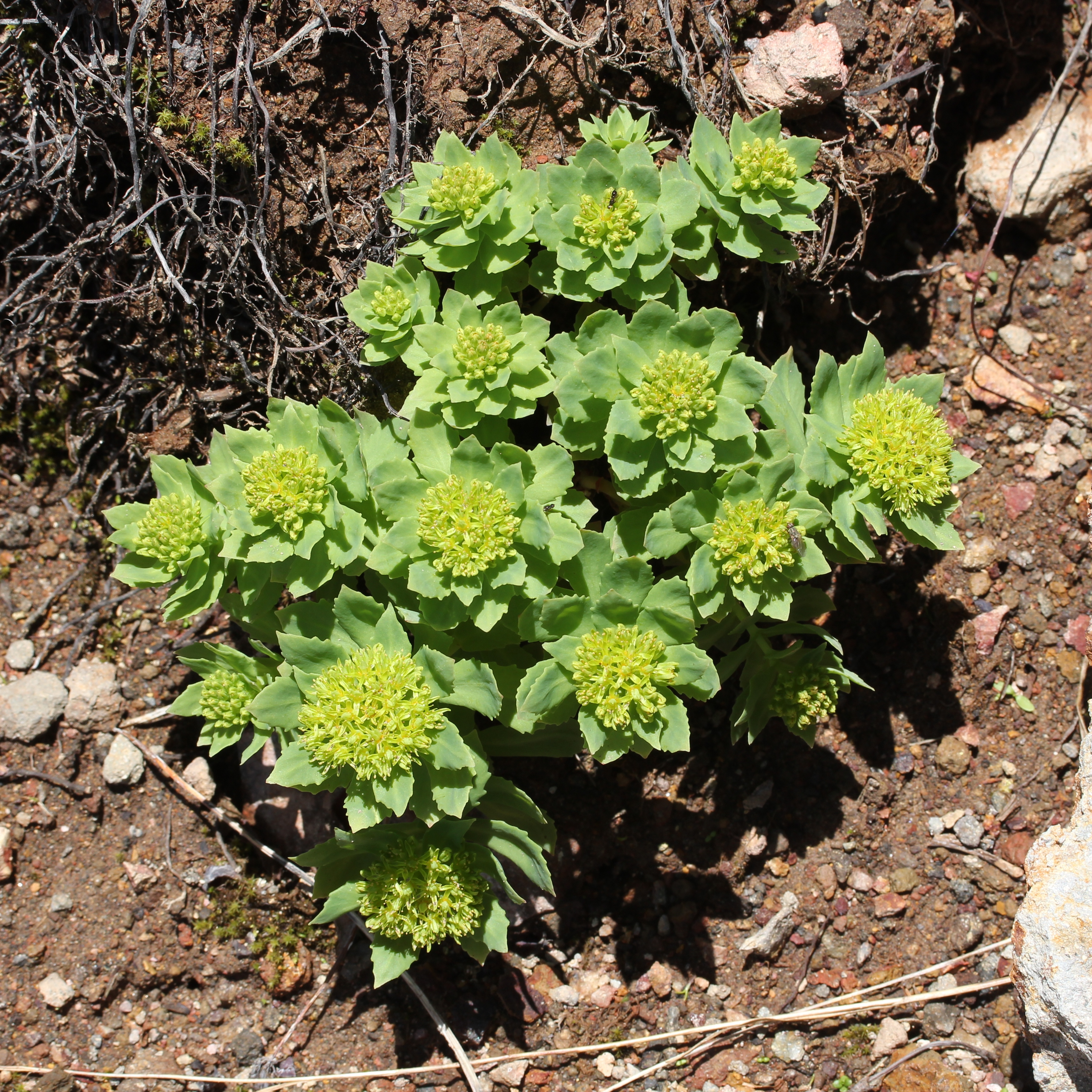
Rhodiola Rosea

Rhodiola rosea, also known as the golden root, was used in folk medicine in and around the Altai mountain ranges. The plant grew at higher elevations and was harvested and dried. This dried form was often placed into hot water and strained to make tea. The plant was recognized by local people to give an energy boost as well as having a calming effect. The plant was very popular in the Soviet Union throughout the mid to late 20th century for its proposed effects. The Soviet Union heavily researched this plant with many rumors stating that Soviet cosmonauts carried it into space.

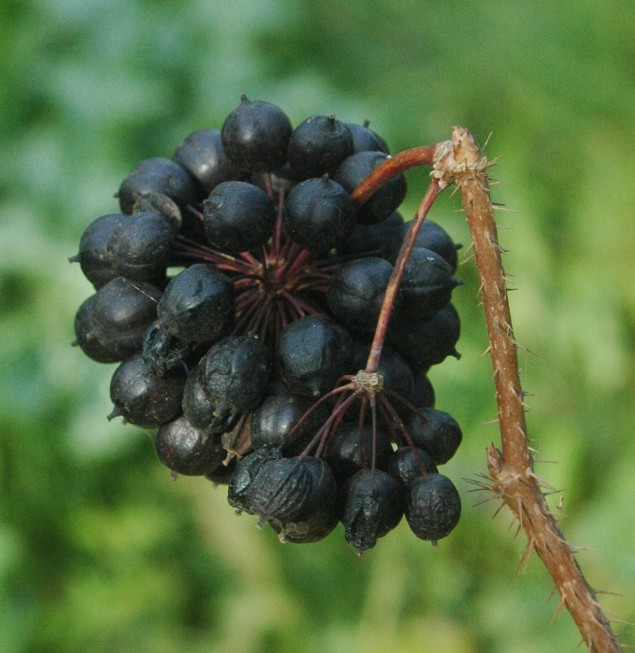
Siberian Ginseng

Siberian ginseng was another plant utilized in traditional Siberian medicine. This plant is found closer to the border with China and is well documented for also being utilized in traditional Chinese medicine. Russian scientists did not categorize this plant as a ginseng until the late 20th century while studying the plant life that grew around the border with China near rivers. This plant is harvested with its roots being dried to be made into tea. Siberian ginseng was noted in traditional medicine for its ability to improve stamina as well as reduce fatigue after physical exertion.

== The role of the shaman ==
One of the essential parts of traditional Siberian medicine is the role of the shaman. The shaman played a central role in daily life in Siberia before the 21st century. All the way up until the 20th century when the Soviet Union began to dictate much of what went on in terms of religion and trade in the region, shamanism dominated the vast lands of Siberia.

Shamans were characterized by their ability to intervene in people's lives. This came in the forms of spirituality along with health and wellness. Shamans were believed to be able to change a person's fortune on top of healing and curing them from ailments. Shamans were able to prescribe different remedies such as different herbal tea for their people to drink in order to feel better and strengthen their immune systems. Shamans were also noted to perform rituals to cleanse the souls of people.

Much of traditional Siberian medicine lies in the hands of shamans who practiced and prescribed various things. Their practices heavily involved taking natural things from the earth as well as knowing their environment to invoke change on multiple levels.

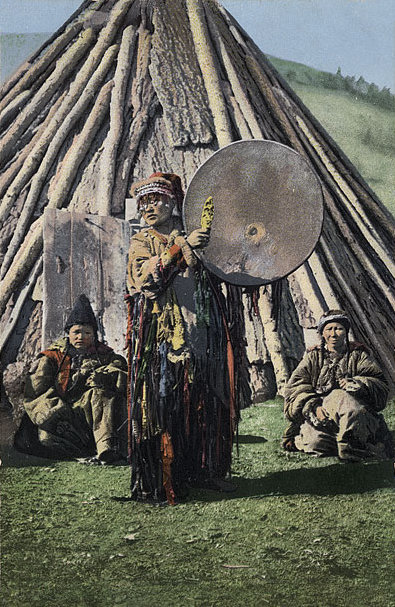
An Altai Shaman depicted with their drum.

One common practice in shamanism was using animal parts in their rituals for healing. Bear claws have been found to be very common during rituals. In one instance, touching a person with a bear claw was thought to cure their asthma and poor health. Shamans were also noted to utilize other natural elements from animals such as their hides and horns to wear during their rituals. Shamans used these hides and other materials to make the drums they used to perform rituals and to summon the healing spirits. The drum and customs worn were an essential part for a successful summoning of the spirits. The usage of animal materials was thought to strengthen their connection to the animals they acquired them from. Oftentimes Siberian shamans would also utilize their knowledge of plants and ecology to use psychoactive substances to aid their ascension into the spirit world. Animal blood and different meats were also often used as offerings to the spirits before the start of rituals. These healing rituals often include seances and dances around fires for the shaman to enter their world. Once there, the shaman would do everything in their power to ward off the bad spirits and cleanse the person's sickness. After warding off the evil, these spirits would also be given parting sacrifices to end the rituals.

== Mushroom use ==
The use of plants that have hallucinogenic effects was a common practice in many shamanistic rituals. One notable example is the A. muscaria. This mushroom is more commonly known as the Fly Agaric. This fungi is poisonous and also has hallucinogenic effects on anyone who consumes it. This mushroom was utilized by many shamans to aid their entrance into the spirit world. These mushrooms would be a small part of how a shaman conducted their ritual to enter into a new state of being. Conflicting views on the uses of mushrooms exist between scholars, with some arguing that shamans with weak connections to the spirit world required the help of these mushrooms to enter the spirit world. Other evidence points to the fact that there are shaman accounts of specific mushroom spirits called the wapaq.

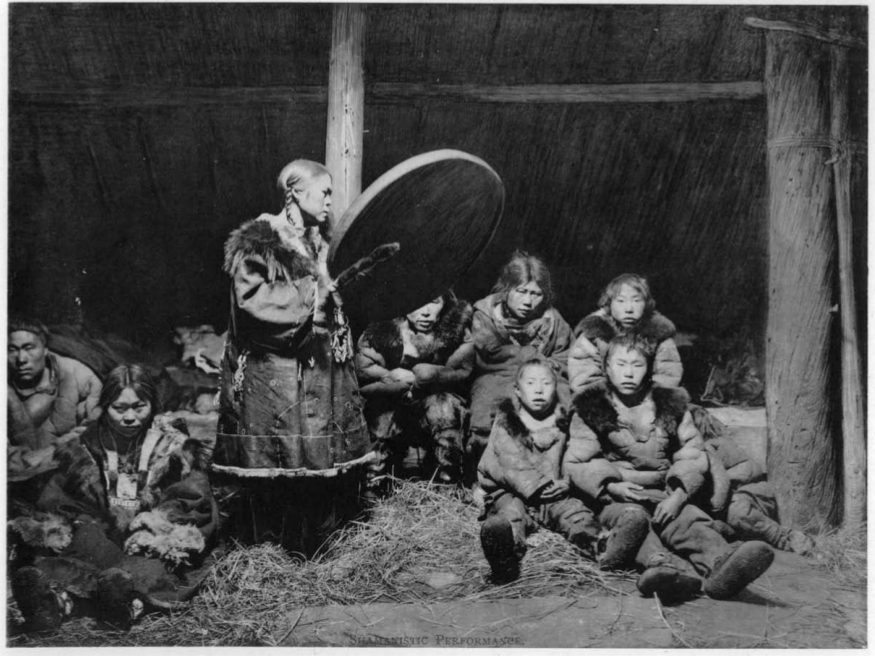
Image of a Koryak female Shaman performing a ritual.

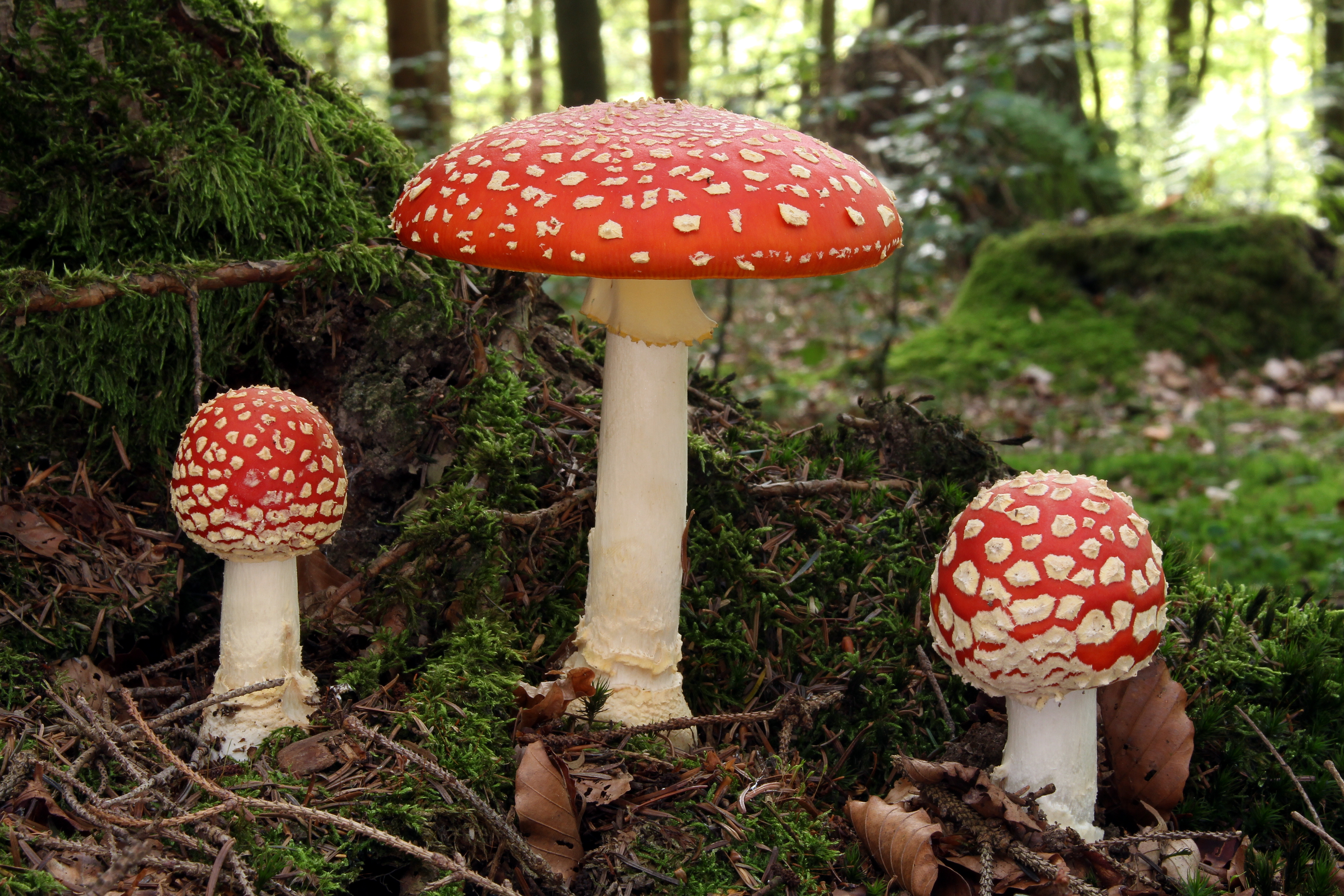
Depiction of the Fly Agaric mushroom

The indigenous people known as the Koryaks are responsible for the tale of mushroom spirits. Their encounters come from the story of a whale being stuck close to the shore asking for help from a raven. The raven was not strong enough to pull this whale back into the sea and had to go searching for help on the mainland. The great spirits in the sky were prophesied to have left sprinkles of patches of mushrooms around the earth called the wapaq spirits. When consumed, they would give the person or animal incredible strength. Other uses for these mushrooms in the Koryak community include ingesting the mushroom so that they can visualize what made them feel ill. The Koryaks differ from other indigenous Siberian people because of the way the role of the shaman is fulfilled. Instead of having community shaman figures, a shaman was often found within a family tree. When suffering from an ailment or misfortune, it was commonplace for the Koryak people to seek out family members who were shamans instead of going to a centralized village figurehead.

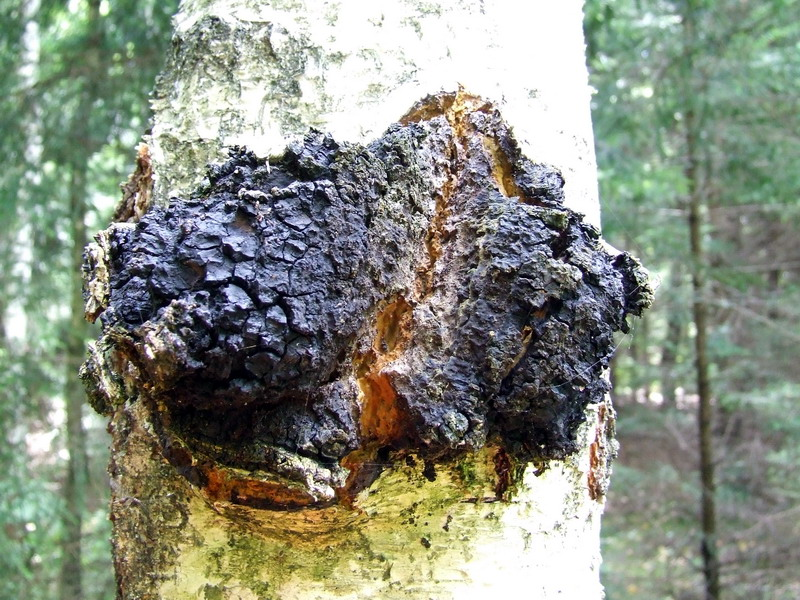
A chaga mushroom grown into the side of a birch tree.

The use of mushrooms was not isolated to the Koryaks: the people of the Chukchi, Yukahgir, and various other groups were noted for their usage of mushrooms in shaman healing rituals. Another indigenous group noted for mushroom usage is the Khanty. An indigenous minority group of people located in western Siberia, the Khanty utilized the Fly Agaric in shaman rituals by ingesting it prior to the start of a ritual. On top of using the Fly Agaric, the Khanty also used the Chaga mushroom. This mushroom was utilized for its antiseptic properties on top of its apparent ability to aid digestion when consumed in the form of tea. The mushroom could be turned into soap bars when mixed in with lard and was also smoked to improve lung health. The chaga mushroom is known to grow on the sides of birch trees in excess and can be harvested by scrapping them off and drying them.

== Ice Baths ==
Map of Yakutia

One of the most notable lands in Siberia is Yakutia. This region of Siberia is recognized for having severe weather conditions with temperatures regularly dipping far below 0 degrees Fahrenheit. In the modern day, a vast majority of Yakut people do not have access to clean drinking water via pipe systems: the weather causes the pipes to freeze. This has led to many people being forced to harvest ice to melt to use for cooking, cleaning and bathing.

Navigating the harsh climate of the region is difficult: many people wear thick fur pelts and jackets covering every inch of their bodies to avoid frostbite. Resilience to the cold is a vital part of Yakutian society. One tradition in the region involves cutting holes in the frozen lakes and briefly staying in the ice water. This tradition dates back centuries and is noted in Yakut culture for strengthening their bodies against the cold and illness. The ice bath can also be followed up with a session in the banya to warm the body. Young children are also not excluded from this practice. The tradition has survived the test of time and is implemented in the modern day. Kindergartens have been recognized for taking ice baths and playing in the snow with minimal layers to strengthen their immune systems and overall health from a young age. The exposure to frigid temperatures is also thought to improve their resilience to the cold.

== Transition from traditional to modern medicine ==
As society progressed in medical technologies, so did Siberia. The first medical school was founded in 1878 by Alexander II. Tomsk Medical Institute would later go on to be renamed as the Siberian State Medical School and would serve as the basis of medical training in the region as more schools were being established. While these schools began to form, this also started the influx of colleges being built in the region. In the early 20th century, the Russian government was able to establish the first modern hospital in Eastern Siberia. This hospital came to serve the inhabitants of Eastern Siberia while also serving as the stepping stone to the local University of Irkutsk. Siberian physicians were held to the same standards as Russian doctors from the inception of the healthcare system there. The schooling requirements remained the same as well as the training.

As hospitals began to rise throughout Siberia, medical education and technology continued to advance. The geography of Siberia still poses issues to medical care. Many villages and settlements are very far away from a hospital. Communities have to rely on local healthcare providers for all types of care from primary care to emergencies. A large portion of rural communities also still consult local shamans for healthcare needs. The expansion of healthcare is still continuing in Siberia, and ways around the geographical constraints are actively being explored. The geography of the land coupled with the harsh climate of some parts makes access to healthcare year round very difficult.

One way around the geographic barriers has been the expansion of mobile healthcare. The Russian government has implemented a hospital train that reaches many remote parts of Siberia to treat patients suffering from a variety of different ailments.

Traditional Siberian medicine also found its way into the Soviet Union during the 20th century. The Soviet Union was in search of substances that could enhance the performance of their soldiers and turned to natural plants and herbs to find one that could provide the desired effects. The Soviet Union was also noted as giving their olympic athletes these plants in the hopes that they would improves their stamina and overall athletic performance during the games.

== Modern medicine ==
Siberian society has mostly modernized with the European side of Russia in terms of healthcare treatment practices. The different patient populations present a different set of challenges for healthcare workers. The access to quality healthcare and different facilities is also a challenge the Russian healthcare system faces when trying to accommodate Siberians. The patient populations are also almost completely different in terms of frequency of certain illnesses and the conditions that people suffer from. The chronic conditions seen in European Russia do not present as often in Siberia and vice versa. This has led to the healthcare systems adapting to tailor treatment to the different patient populations. The modern healthcare system accounts for the various demographics it has to treat on a daily basis.

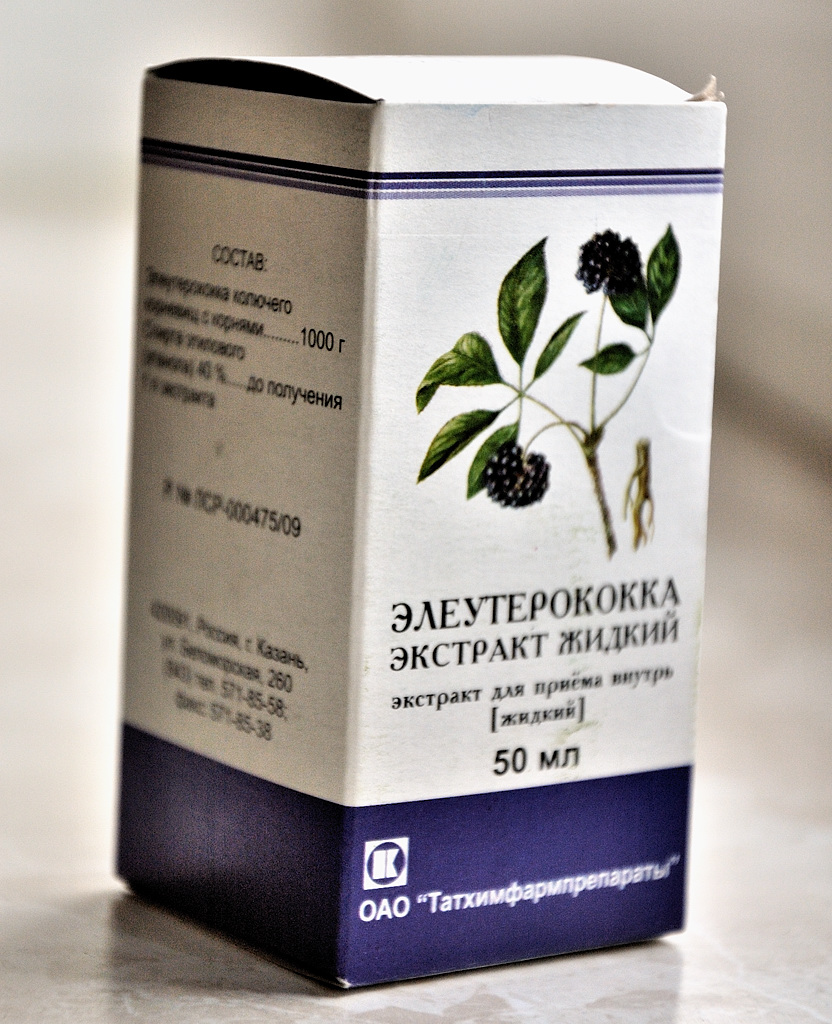
A box of Siberian Ginseng extract.

In the modern day, many Siberians and Russians still enjoy drinking tea made from Siberian ginseng and Rhodiola. Many people also still follow ancient practices of ice baths and polar plunges. Many villages in the area still heavily rely on these herbs as currency for trade. There has been a notable shortage in the harvest of herbs like the Rhodiola Rosea that the Evenki people heavily rely on. Climate change and various other factors have led to the decrease in the prevalence of this plant, ultimately causing a strain on the market and the people that rely on it to make a living.

Traditional Siberian medicine is still passed down in households as remedies for various ailments. Avenues of research have been heavily investigated by scientists in the area of adaptogens to further understand the effects of these herbs on the human body. Adaptogen research peaked during the mid to late 20th century. Many papers were published under the rule of the Soviet Union on the observed positive effects of these herbs. American researchers began studying these plants in the late 1990's, and have continued into the modern day with research giving the effects of some of these plants like Siberian Ginseng an overall grade of C for effectiveness as an adaptogen.
