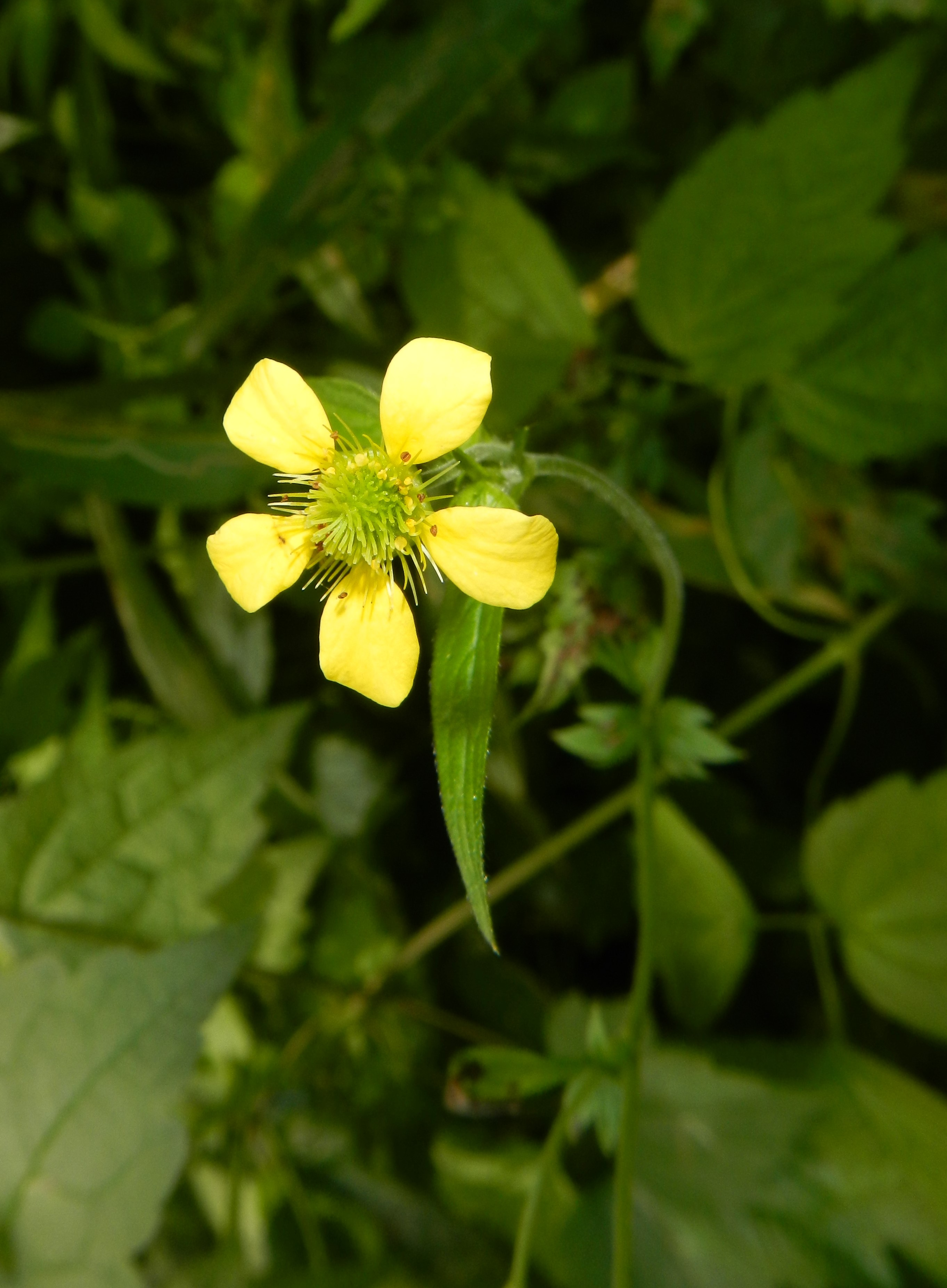

Scientific classification
- Kingdom: Plantae
- Clade: Tracheophytes
- Clade: Angiosperms
- Clade: Eudicots
- Clade: Rosids
- Order: Rosales
- Family: Rosaceae
- Genus: Geum
- Species: G. × catlingii

Binomial name
- Geum × catlingii J.-P. Bernard & R. Gauthier

= Geum × catlingii =

Species of flowering plant

Geum × catlingii, or Catling's avens, is a plant in the rose family, Rosaceae. It is known from eastern Canada, where it arises from natural hybridization between the native G. canadense Jacq. and the introduced G. urbanum L. It is named after Paul M. Catling, the botanist who first observed the hybrid.

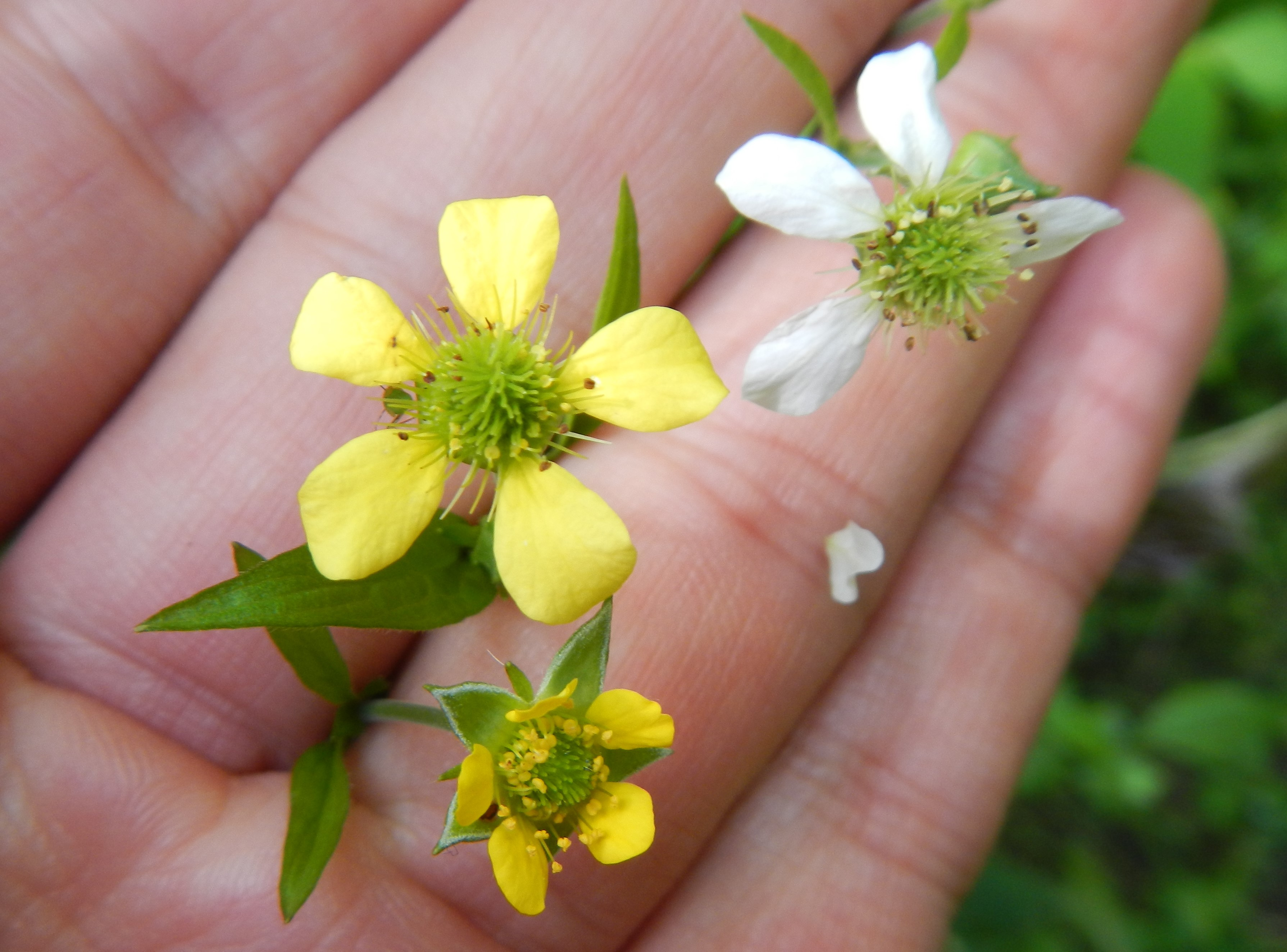
Geum ×catlingii (centre), with parents G. canadense (top right), and G. urbanum (bottom centre)

== Description ==
Geum × catlingii is a hybrid taxon, and as such exhibits variable morphology. However, several characters in combination help distinguish it from other Geum species:

- Hybrid vigor - hybrids tend to be larger than parents
- Petals are creamy-yellow - intermediate between dark yellow (G. urbanum) and white (G. canadense).
- Intermediate stem bract size
- Highly sterile ovaries

It has been noted to bloom throughout the summer, after other species have shed their petals.
