= Neuradopsis =

Scientific classification
- Kingdom: Plantae
- Clade: Tracheophytes
- Clade: Angiosperms
- Clade: Eudicots
- Clade: Rosids
- Order: Malvales
- Family: Neuradaceae
- Genus: Neuradopsis; Bremek. & Oberm.

Genus of plants

Neuradopsis is a genus of flowering plants belonging to the family Neuradaceae.

Its native range is Southern Africa.

Species:

- Neuradopsis austroafricana (Schinz) Bremek. & Oberm.
- Neuradopsis bechuanensis Bremek. & Oberm.
