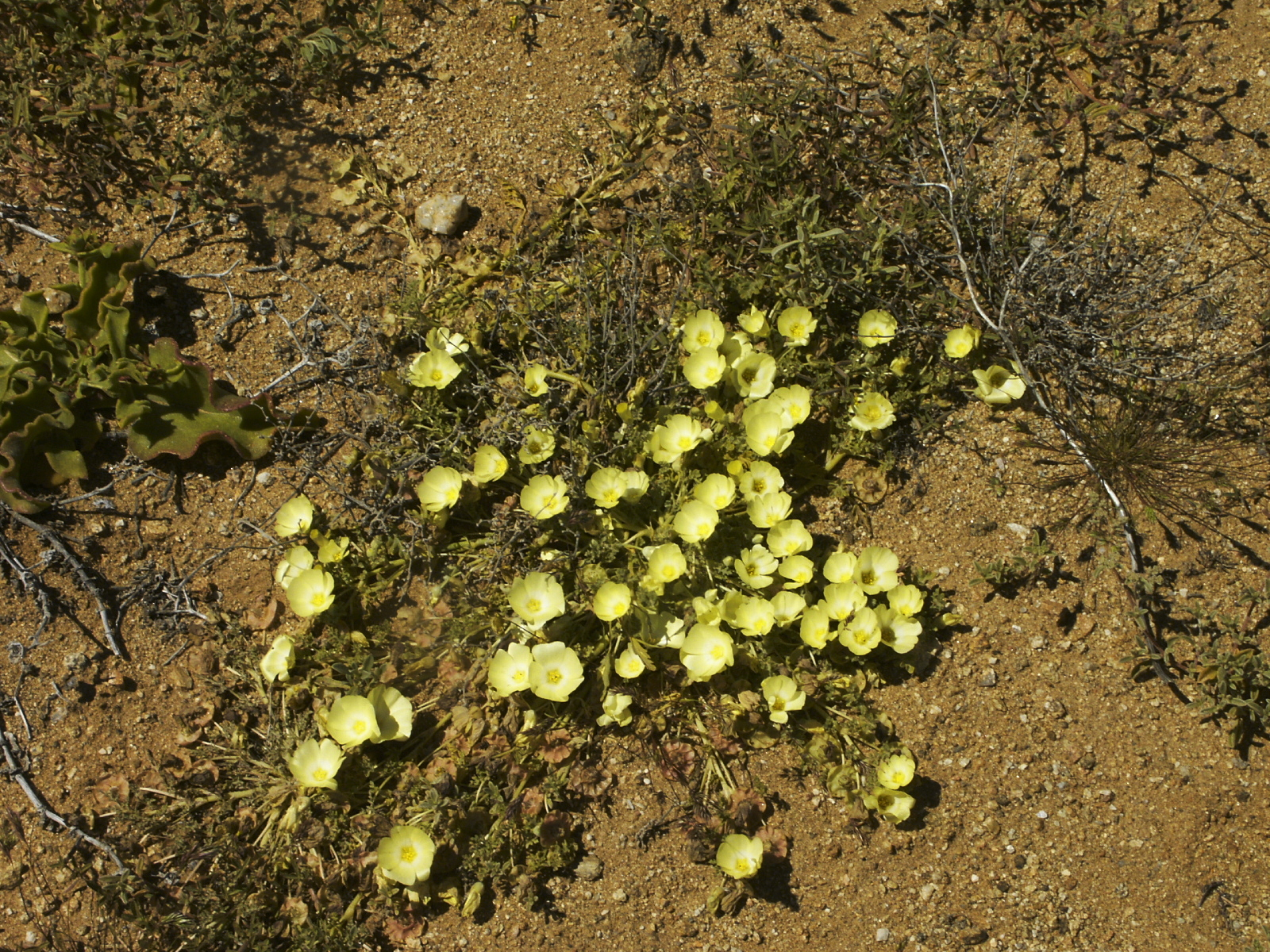
- Grielum humifusum

Scientific classification
- Kingdom: Plantae
- Clade: Embryophytes
- Clade: Tracheophytes
- Clade: Spermatophytes
- Clade: Angiosperms
- Clade: Eudicots
- Clade: Rosids
- Order: Malvales
- Family: Neuradaceae
- Genus: Grielum; L.

Species
- See text

= Grielum =

Genus of flowering plants from western southern Africa

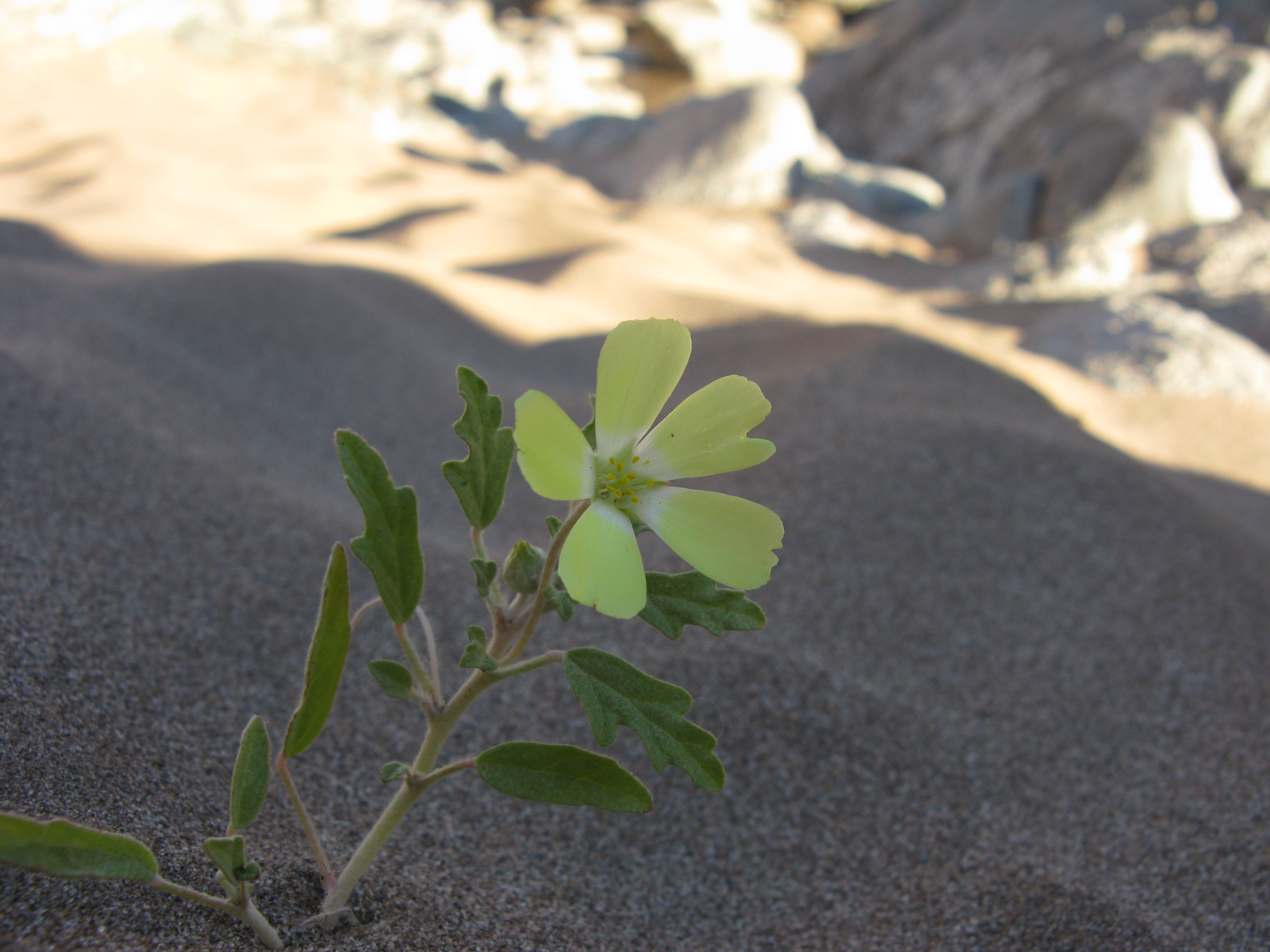
Grielum humifusum in the wild in Namibia. This specimen has unusually narrow petals and entire leaves.

Grielum is a genus of four accepted species of plants in the family Neuradaceae. They are low-growing annual herbs endemic to dry regions, mainly in Western South Africa and Namibia.

== Description ==
The genus comprises annual dwarf herbs with pronounced taproots.

- The leaves are more or less furry, and may be canescent or tomentose. They are lobed at least, but more typically are decompound. The stipules are obsolete, being barely evident if present at all.
- The flowers are conspicuous and are borne on singly on pedicels in leaf axils. They are generally vivid lemon-yellow in colour, but with a white centre in some species. The calyx has five sepals, forming a shallow cup. The corolla has five petals, usually imbricate and thereby forming a shallow bowl, though this is less evident if the petals happen to be narrow, as sometimes occurs on a particular plant. The petals are inserted into the throat of the calyx cup. There are ten stamens, more or less set in two whorls of five, inserted between the base of the gynoecium and the petals. The carpels typically are five in number, but may vary from about 3 to 10. They are connate and remain so in the fruit, which forms a synaptospermic diaspore that may act as a trample burr, being spread by sticking to animals' feet. The styles are terete and the stigmas capitate.
- The taproot of local species is well developed as a storage organ and is an important source of food and moisture for some animals such as duiker, so much so that one of its common names is "duikerwortel", Afrikaans for "duiker root"; duikers are notorious for digging up the root from sandy soils. It also was an important food plant for local hunter-gatherers. It is thick and so mucilaginous that it also is known by variations on the name "Pietsnot", meaning "snotty Pete". The taproot of for example Grielum humifusum and Grielum grandiflorum are relished even by some campers when roasted on a campfire.

== Species ==
Four species are recognised:

- Grielum cuneifolium Schinz
- Grielum grandiflorum (L.) Druce
- Grielum humifusum Thunb.
- Grielum sinuatum Licht. ex Burch.
