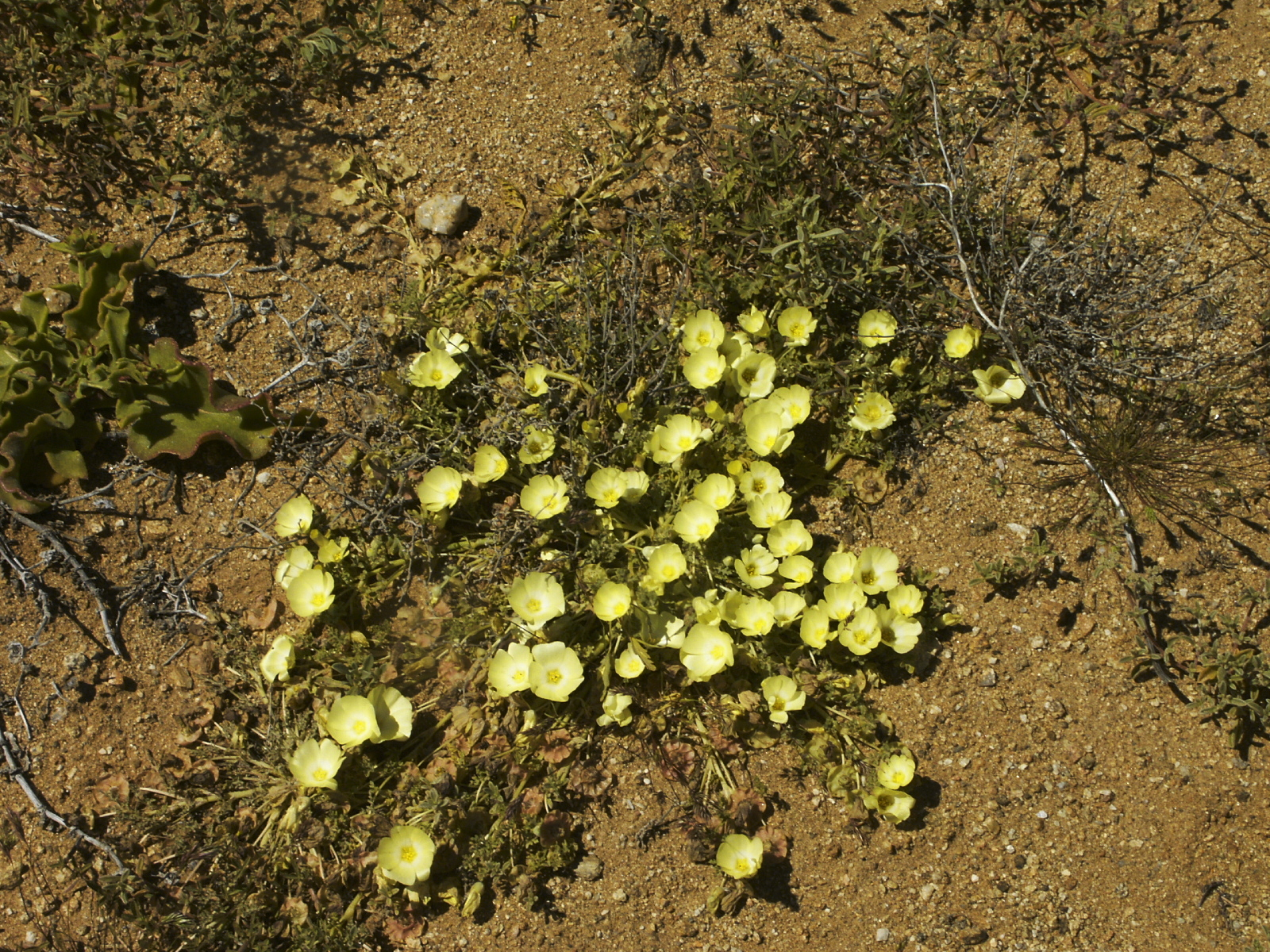
- Grielum humifusum

Scientific classification
- Kingdom: Plantae
- Clade: Tracheophytes
- Clade: Angiosperms
- Clade: Eudicots
- Clade: Rosids
- Order: Malvales
- Family: Neuradaceae; Kostel.

Genera
- Grielum L.; Neurada L.; Neuradopsis Bremek. & Oberm.

= Neuradaceae =

Family of flowering plants

The Neuradaceae are a family of flowering plant, comprising three genera — Grielum, Neurada and Neuradopsis — totalling ten known species.

These genera were formerly placed in order Rosales, and in one case even in family Rosaceae, but they are now recognised as belonging to order Malvales. The family needs further research.
