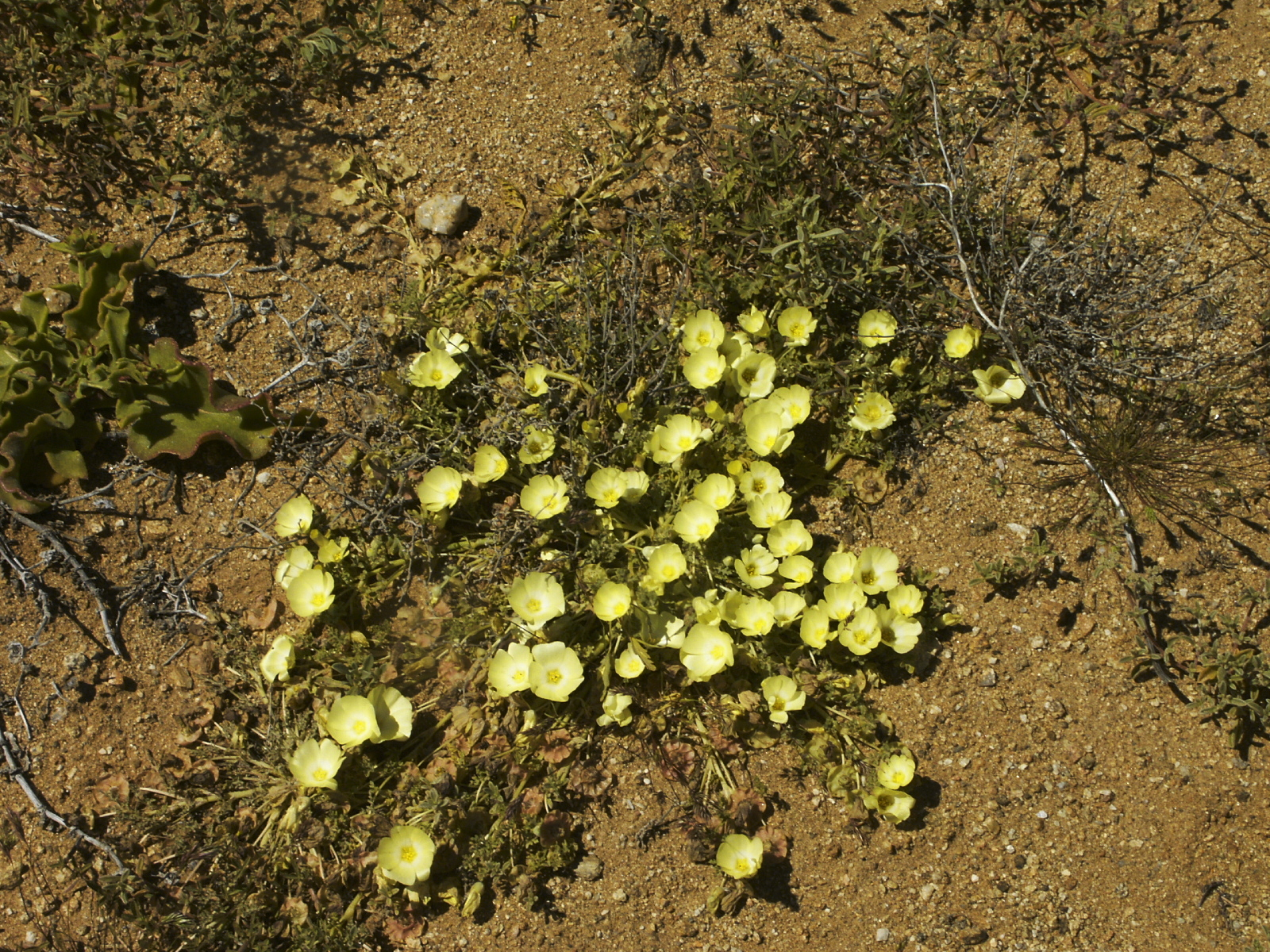

Scientific classification
- Kingdom: Plantae
- Clade: Tracheophytes
- Clade: Angiosperms
- Clade: Eudicots
- Clade: Rosids
- Order: Malvales
- Family: Neuradaceae
- Genus: Grielum
- Species: G. humifusum

Binomial name
- Grielum humifusum Thunb.

= Grielum humifusum =

Species of flowering plant

Grielum humifusum is a species of flowering plant in the family Neuradaceae.
