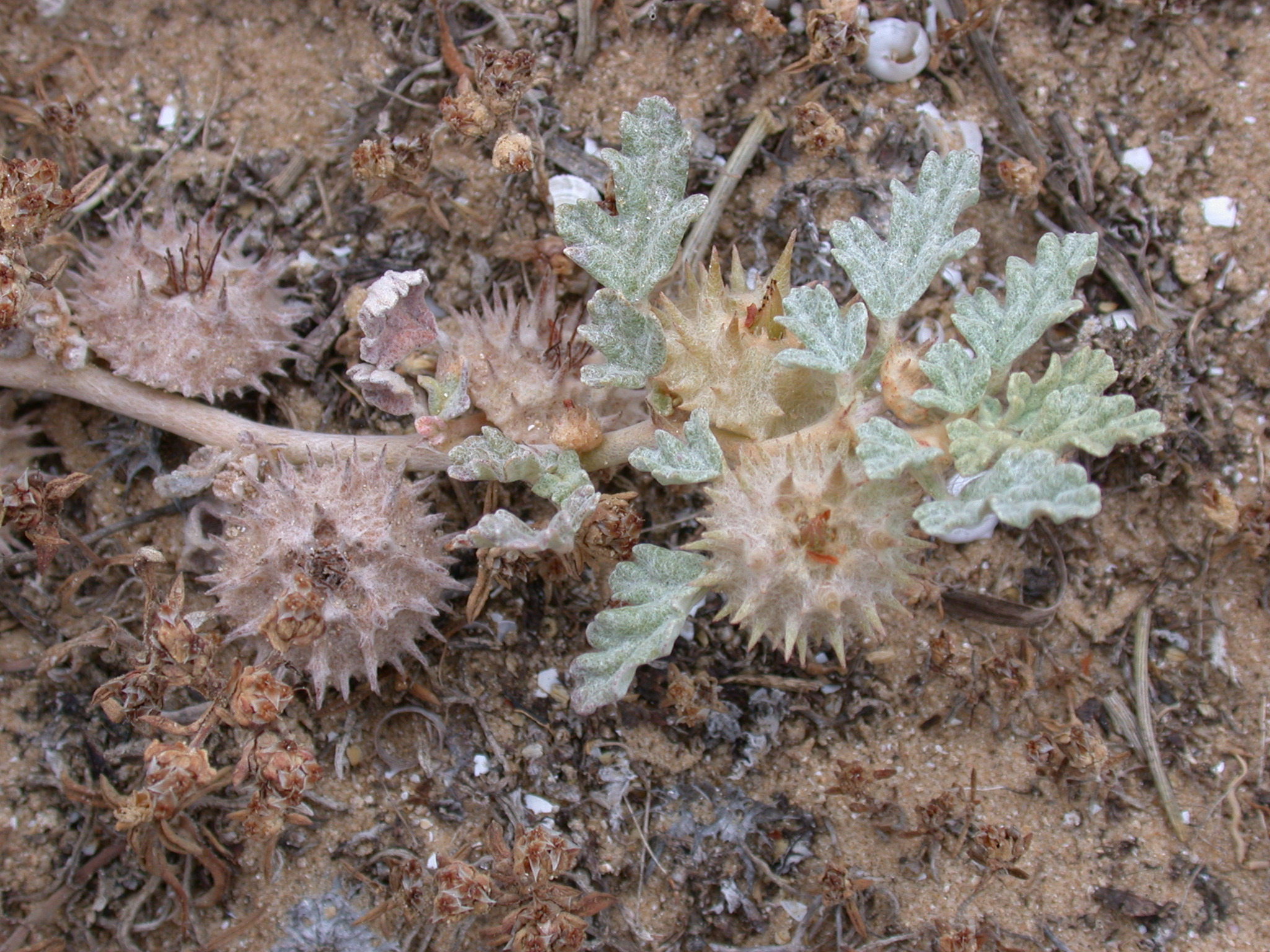
- Neurada procumbens

Scientific classification
- Kingdom: Plantae
- Clade: Tracheophytes
- Clade: Angiosperms
- Clade: Eudicots
- Clade: Rosids
- Order: Malvales
- Family: Neuradaceae
- Genus: Neurada; B.Juss.

Species
- See text

Synonyms
- Figaraea Viv.; Neuras Adans.

= Neurada =

Genus of flowering plants

Neurada is a genus of flowering plants in the family Neuradaceae, found in northern Africa, Cyprus, the Arabian Peninsula, the Levant, Iraq, Iran, Afghanistan, Pakistan and India. They are desert-adapted prostrate annual herbs with bizarre spiny flowers and fruits. Local people use them as a medicinal herb for a variety of conditions and as a nerve tonic. It is also used for camel fodder.

== Species ==
Currently accepted species include:

- Neurada al-eisawii Barsotti, Borzatti & Garbari
- Neurada procumbens L.
