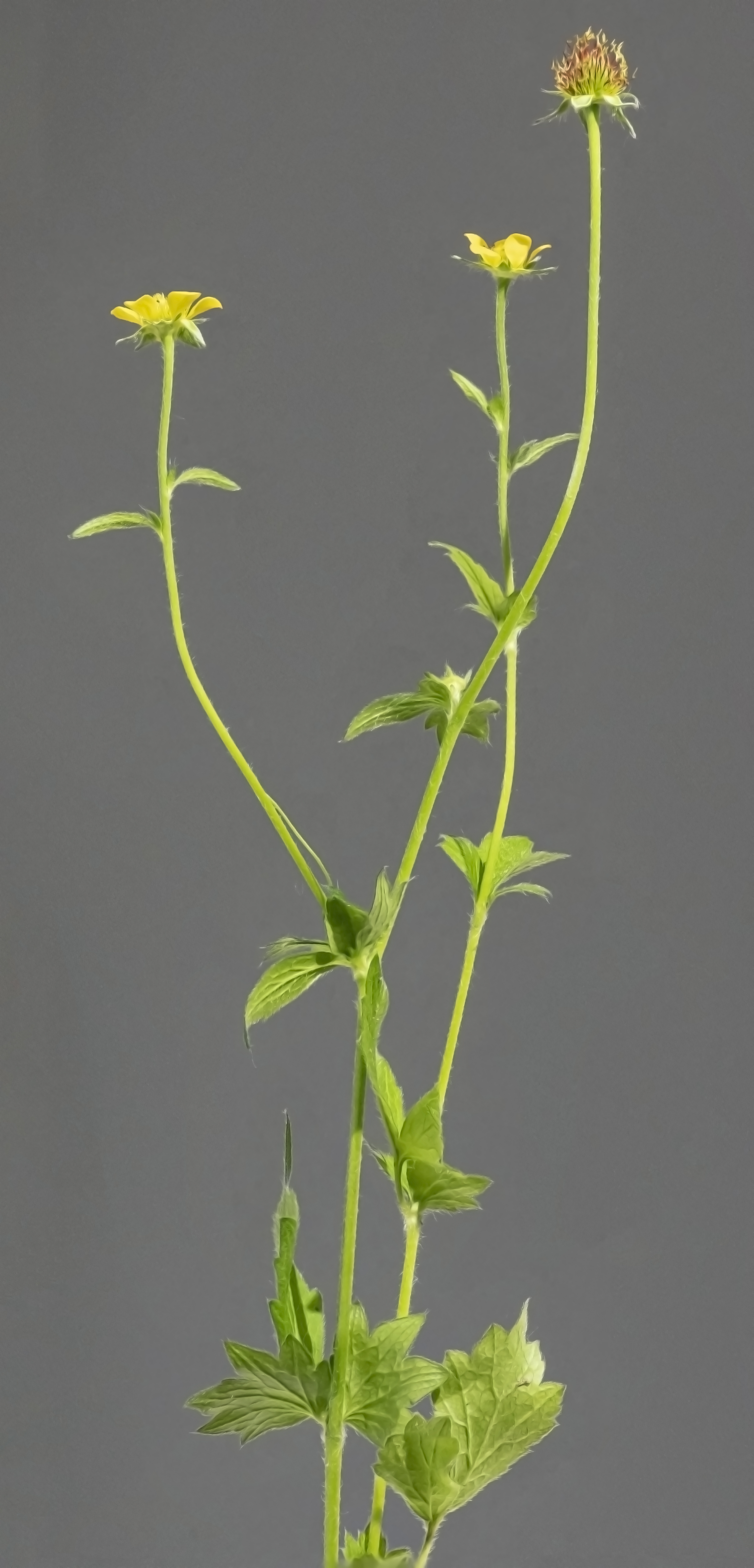

Scientific classification
- Kingdom: Plantae
- Clade: Tracheophytes
- Clade: Angiosperms
- Clade: Eudicots
- Clade: Rosids
- Order: Rosales
- Family: Rosaceae
- Genus: Geum
- Species: G. urbanum

Binomial name
- Geum urbanum L.

= Geum urbanum =

Species of flowering plant

Geum urbanum, also known as wood avens, herb Bennet, colewort, clove root and St. Benedict's herb (Latin: herba benedicta), is a perennial plant in the rose family (Rosaceae), which grows in shady places (such as woodland edges and near hedgerows) in the temperate regions of Eurasia and North America.

== Description ==
Geum urbanum is a downy perennial herb with a short, thick rhizome and thin wiry stems, reaching up to 60 centimetres (24 in). The rhizome is purple in cross-section.

The leaves, which vary considerably in form depending on their position and local growth conditions, are pinnate, with 2–3 pairs of unequal lateral leaflets measuring 5–10 millimetres (1/4–3/8 in) long, and one large terminal three-lobed leaflet that is cuneate to cordate at the base. The upper leaves on the stem are trifoliate, consisting of three long narrow leaflets, or undivided. The stipules, measuring 4 x 3 cm, are as wide as long.

The plant blooms between May and August, but the flowers can remain into the autumn and sometimes as late as December. The flowers are 1–2 cm in diameter, having five bright yellow petals clearly separated from a calyx divided into 5 large and 5 small segments. The hermaphrodite flowers, which are relatively small in relation to the size of the plant, are scented and are pollinated by bees.

The fruiting head consists of many zigzag-shaped hairy achenes measuring 5–10 mm long. In fruit, the lower part of each style has a burr that can hook on to the fur of rabbits and other animals for dispersal.

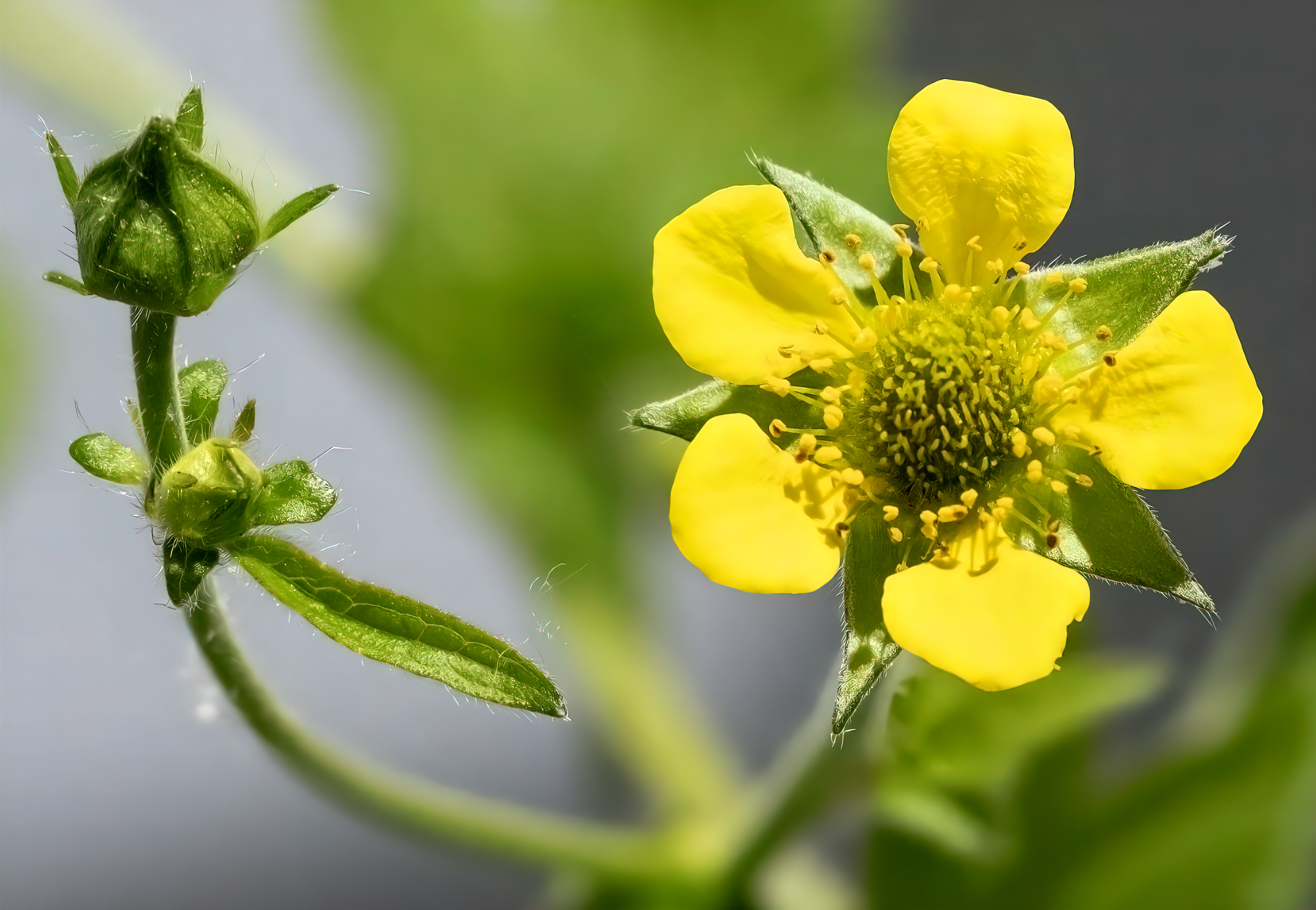
Buds and flower

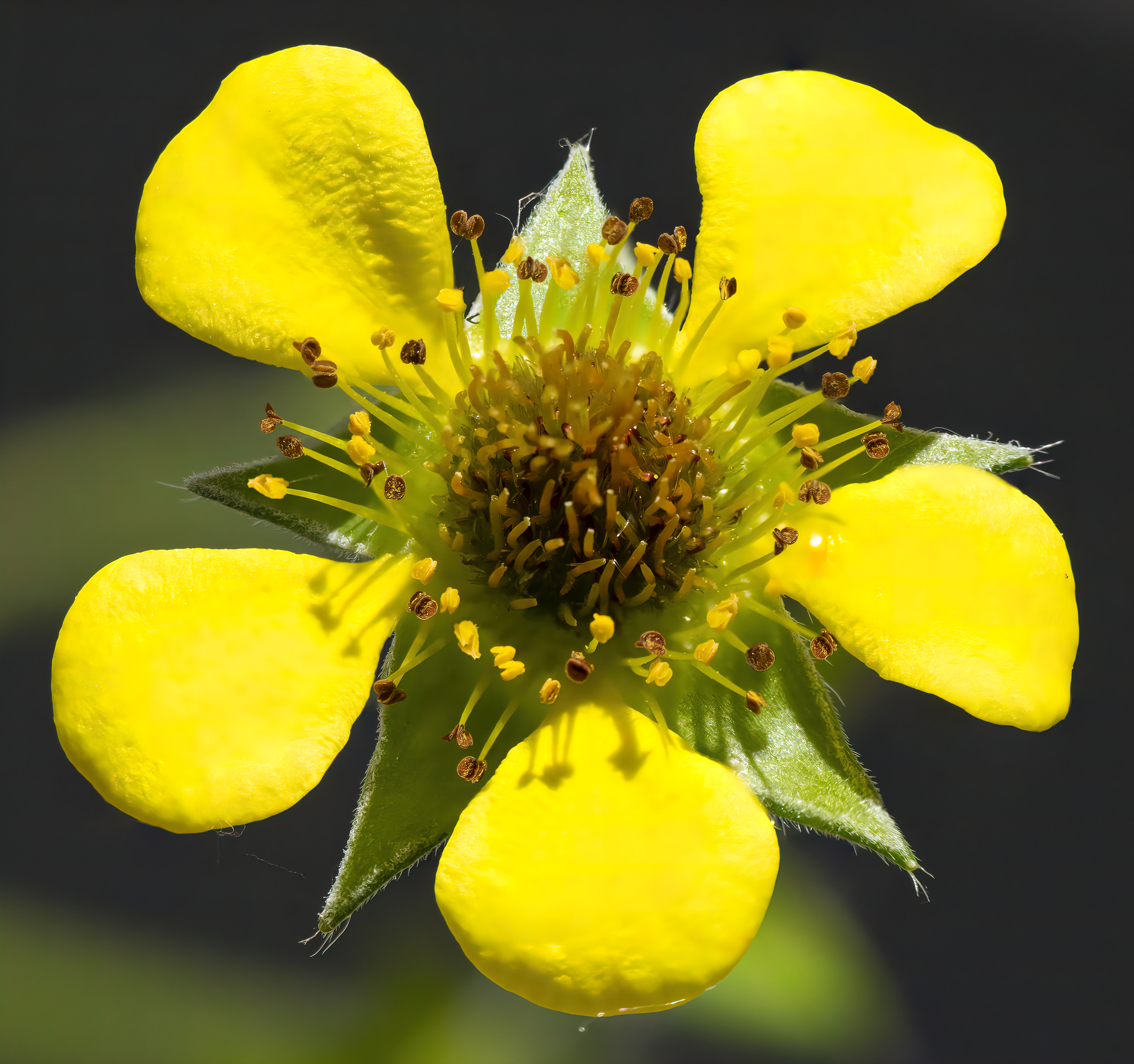
Flower

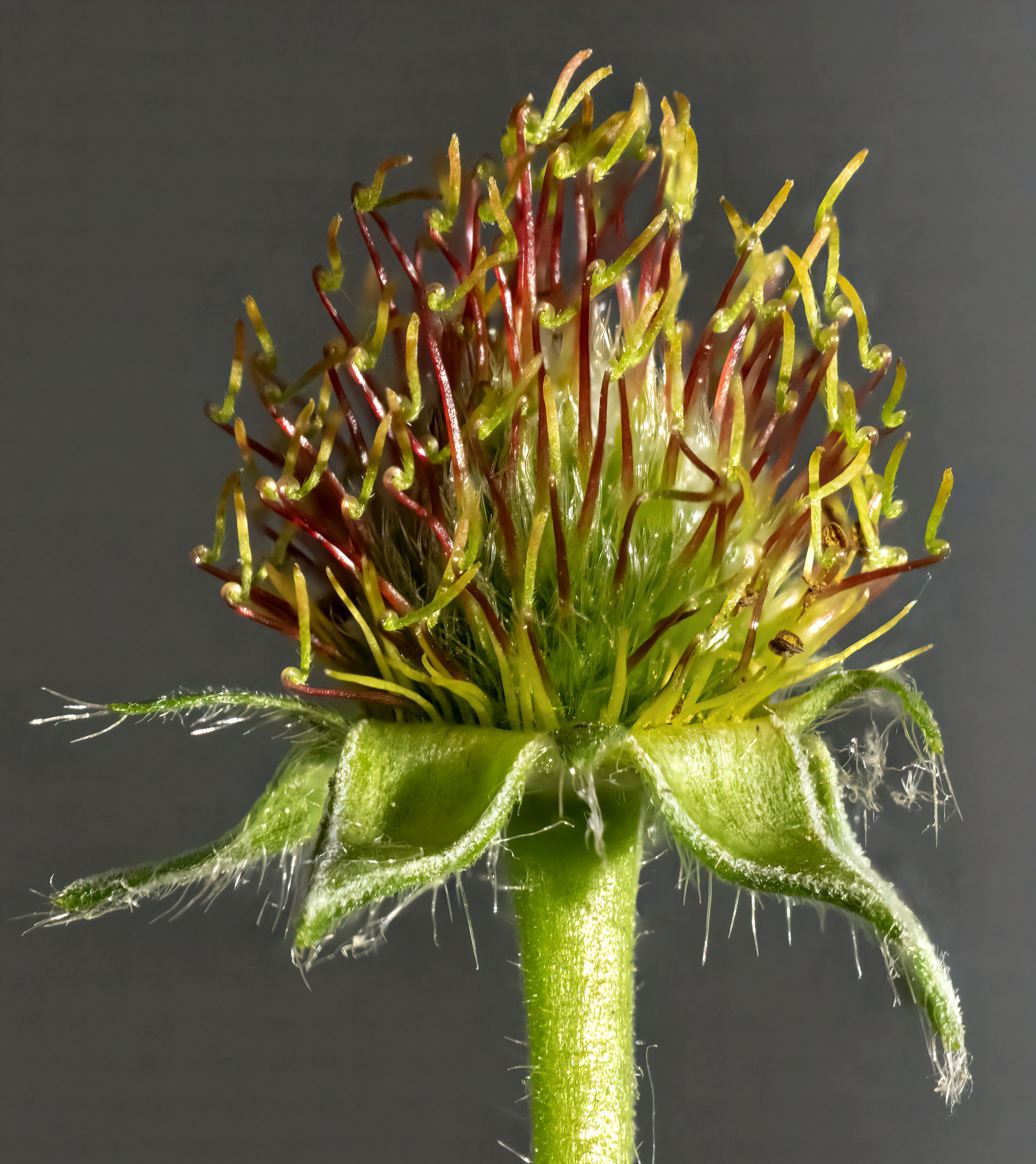
Immature fruit

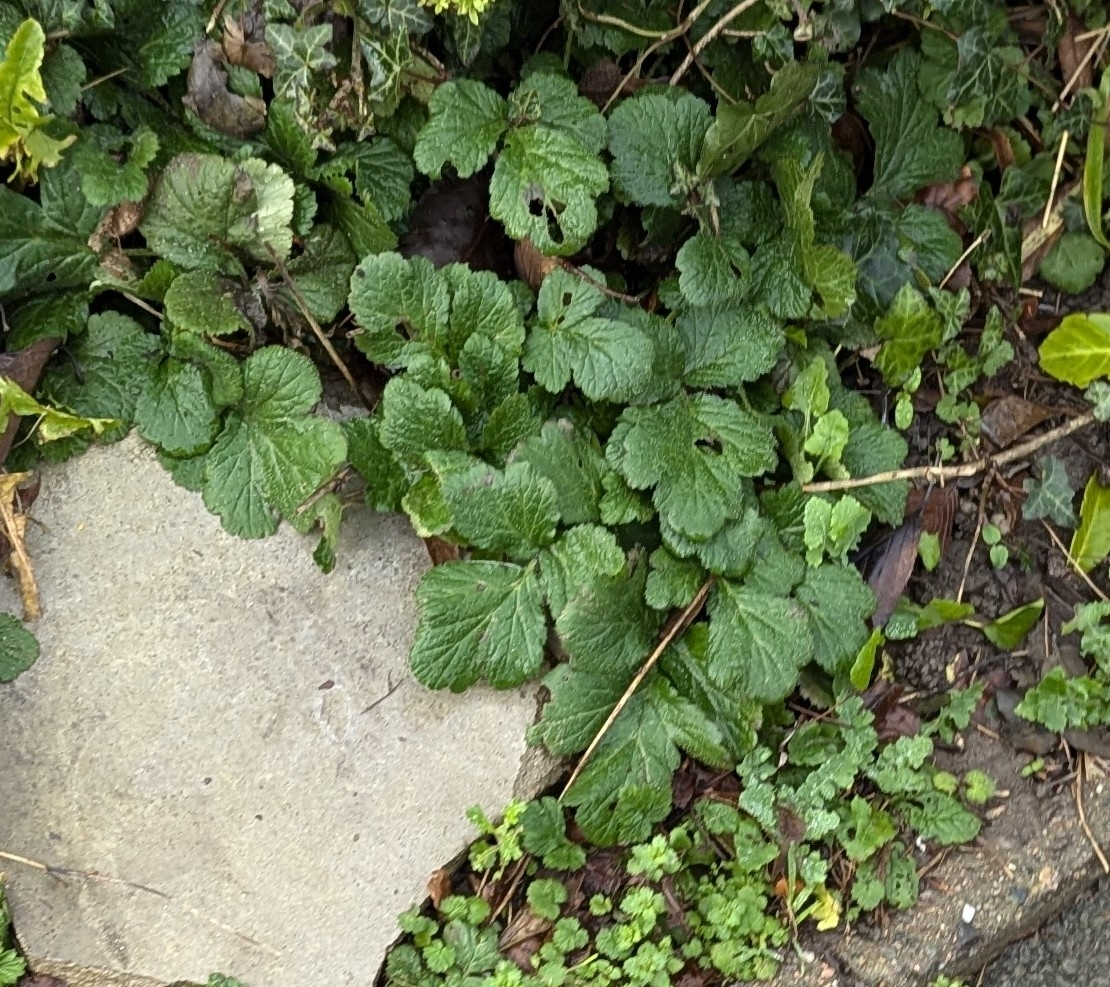
foliage

== Taxonomy ==
Geum urbanum hybridizes fairly regularly with Geum rivale (water avens), as they are closely related and cooccur. In fact, the phenomenon is so conspicuous that hybrids were once treated as a separate species named Geum intermedium Ehrh.

It has been introduced in North America, where it forms natural hybrids with Geum canadense (= Geum ×catlingii J.-P. Bernard & R. Gauthier).

Both G. urbanum and its hybrids show hexaploidy, with chromosome number 2n = 42.

=== Etymology ===
The common name avens is derived from the Latin avencia, in turn from the medieval Latin avantia or avence. The other English name herb Bennet is a corruption of the old herbalist name herba benedicta, meaning blessed herb.

The generic name Geum originated from the Greek geno, a word meaning to yield a pleasant aroma, in reference to the root’s strong clove-like smell when freshly dug up. The specific epithet urbanum means ‘of towns’.

== Distribution ==
Geum urbanum is found throughout Europe (its areas are more scattered in southern Iberia and in Russia, and it is completely absent from northern Scandinavia, Iceland, the Faroe Islands, Shetland, Malta, the Balearic and the Aegean islands). It also occurs in the Atlas Mountains of Morocco, Algeria and Tunisia, in Turkey and the Levant, the Caucasus and the Armenian Highlands, around the Alborz mountains in Iran, and less extensively in western Siberia and in the mountains of Central Asia up to the Western Himalayas.

== Ecology ==
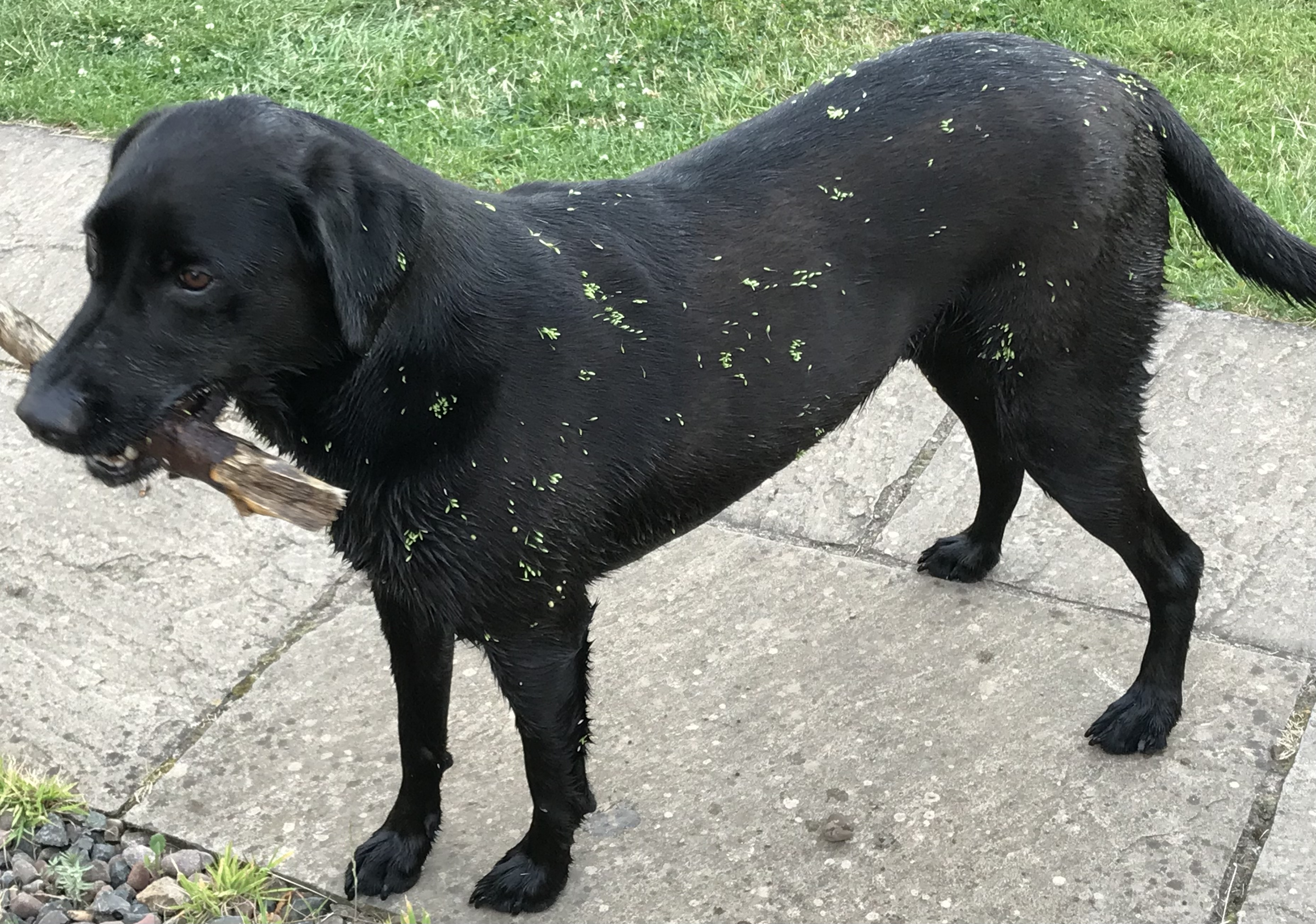
Fruits attached to the fur of a Labrador Retriever

G. urbanum is a common, typically lowland plant favouring dry semi-natural broadleaved woodland, scrub, hedgerows, and waysides on well-drained soils. It sometimes also grows in open disturbed habitats rich in soil nitrogen, occurring as a garden weed. It grows on mildly acidic to calcareous soils in the pH range 5.4–7.7. The plant has a moderate shade tolerance and is absent from open grassland communities where it appears unable to compete with other species

It has short rhizomes that support production of flowering stems and potentially viable axillary buds for several years after the buds have been produced The plant is usually sparsely distributed in its habitat since new plants mostly originate from scattered propagules. Vegetative spread is relatively rare. Some of its basal rosette leaves are produced in October, overwinter in the vegetative state, remain green and are photosynthetically active during winter.

G. urbanum occurs in a range of woodland and scrub communities, such as Fraxinus excelsior – Acer campestris – Mercurialis perennis – Glechoma hederacea subcommunity (W8) on base-rich soils and the F. excelsior – Sorbus aucuparia – M. perennis community (W9) in the cooler and wetter parts of Britain in the northwest. It occasionally occurs in Alnus glutinosa – Urtica dioica woodland (W6). It is widespread but local in Rubus fruticosus – Holcus lanatus scrub (W24).

G. urbanum has been observed to be infected by various fungal pathogens, including downy mildew species in Peronospora, the powdery mildew Podosphaera aphanis sensu lato, and Ramularia species, of which the latter causes the formation of pale spots on the leaves.

== Uses ==
The leaves can be cooked like spinach.

The roots contain the compound eugenol (which is also present in cloves), and are used as a spice in soups and also for flavouring ale. For example, the Augsburg Ale is said to owe its peculiar flavour to the addition of a small bag of avens inside each cask. The fresh root imparts a pleasant clove-like flavour to the liquor, preserves it from turning sour, and adds to its wholesome properties.

Herbalists use wood avens to treat various diseases, but there is no evidence that it makes any difference.

A cordial against the plague was made by boiling the roots in wine. English botanist John Gerard recommended a "decoction made in wine against stomach ills and bites of venomous beasts". Because of its digestive tonic properties, chewing of the root was also recommended for foul breath.

== In culture ==
In folklore, wood avens is credited with the power to drive away evil spirits, and worn as an amulet to protect against rabid dogs and venomous snakes. The Ortus Sanitatis, printed in 1491, states:

Where the root is in the house, Satan can do nothing and flies from it, wherefore it is blessed before all other herbs, and if a man carries the root about him no venomous beast can harm him.

It was associated with Christianity because its leaves grew in threes and its petals in fives (reminiscent of, respectively, the Holy Trinity and the Five Wounds). Astrologically, it was said to be ruled by Jupiter.

== Sources ==
- Howard, Michael. Traditional Folk Remedies (Century, 1987), pp 99–100.
