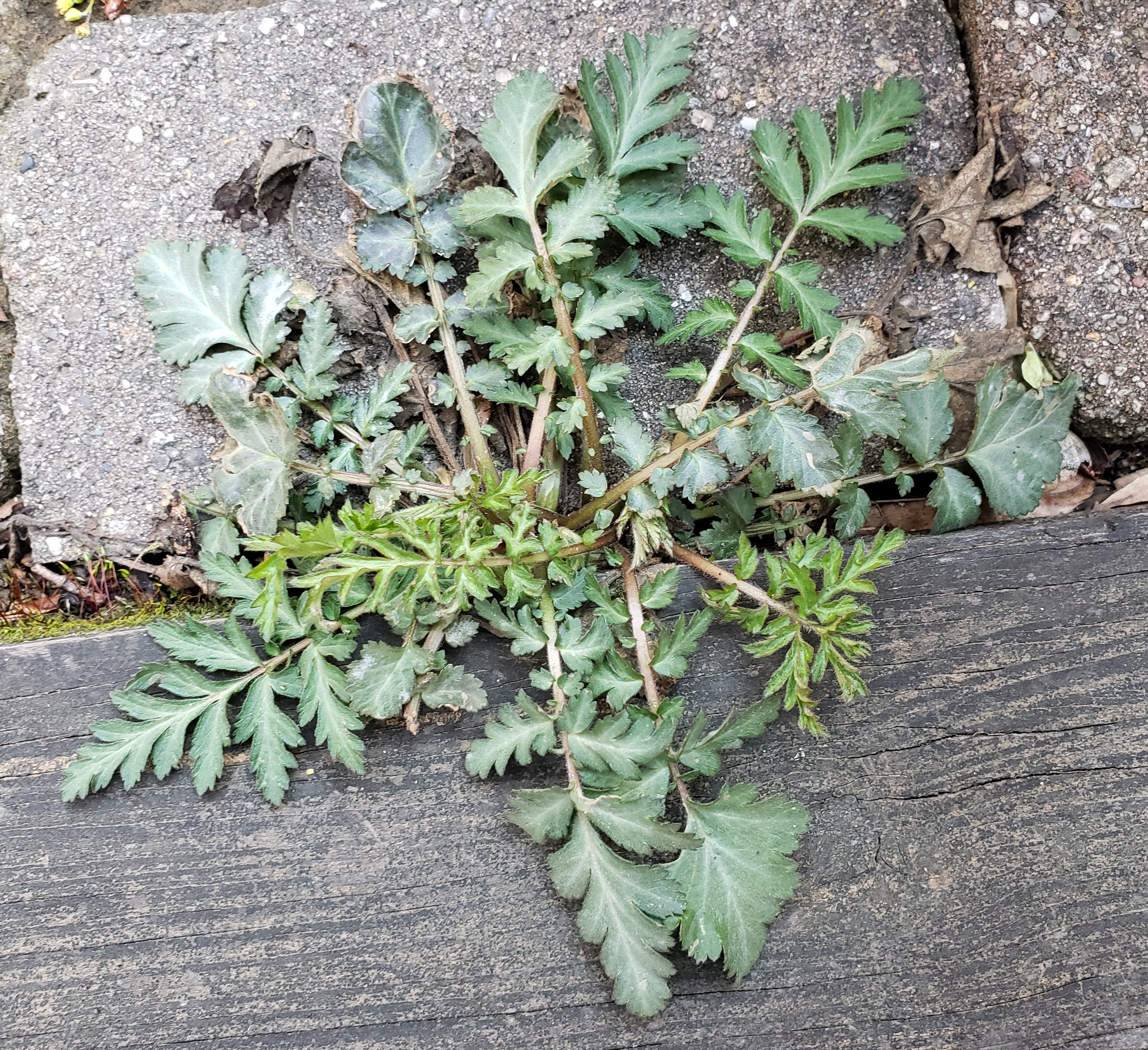
- Leaves

Conservation status
- Secure (NatureServe)

Scientific classification
- Kingdom: Plantae
- Clade: Tracheophytes
- Clade: Angiosperms
- Clade: Eudicots
- Clade: Rosids
- Order: Rosales
- Family: Rosaceae
- Genus: Geum
- Species: G. canadense

Binomial name
- Geum canadense Jacq.

= Geum canadense =

Species of flowering plant

Geum canadense, the white avens, is a plant in the rose family, Rosaceae. It is widespread across much of Canada, the United States, and Mexico.

It readily hybridizes with the introduced Geum urbanum. The hybrid is named Geum × catlingii J.-P. Bernard & R. Gauthier.

== Description ==
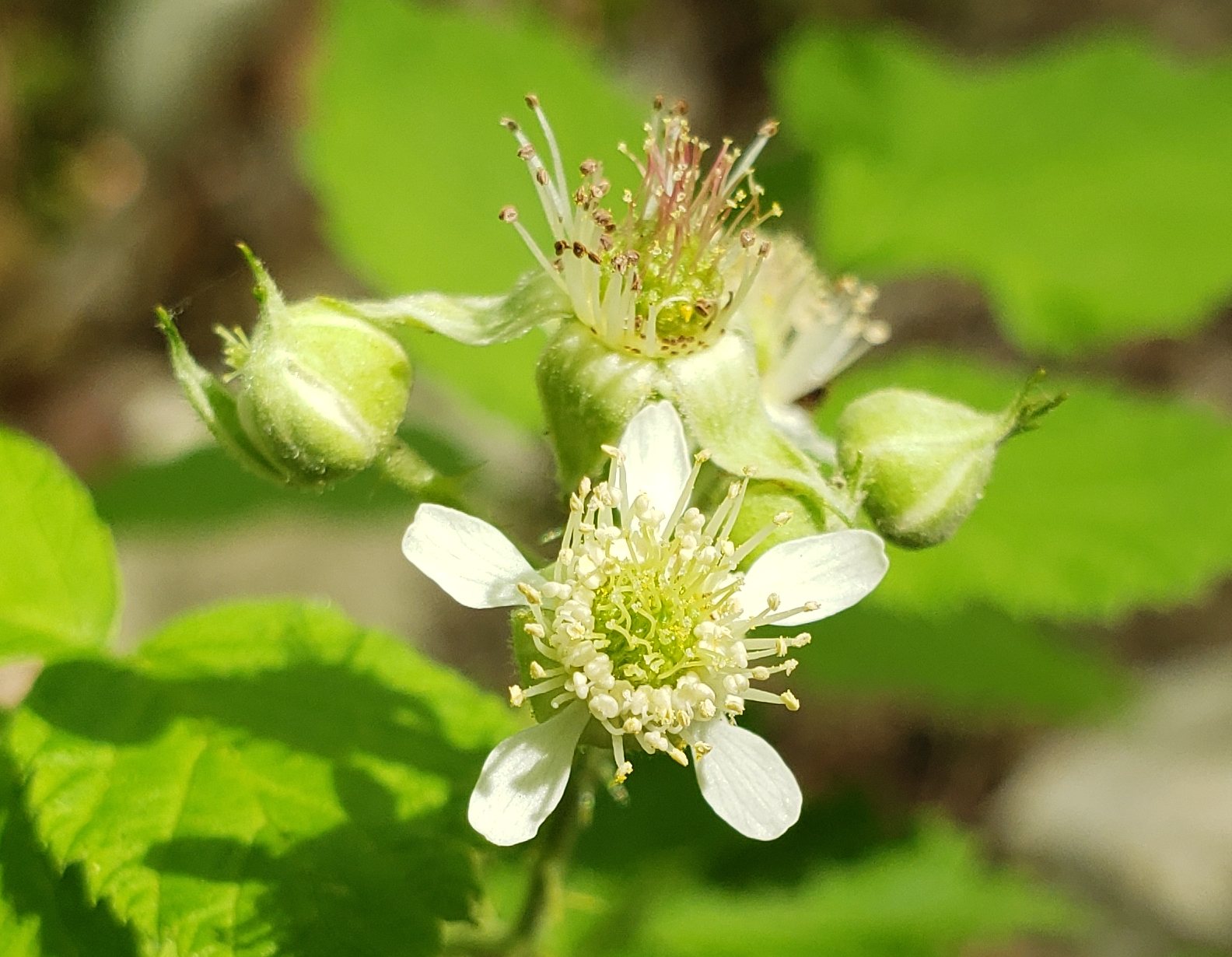
Flower

Geum canadense is a herbaceous plant with basal leaves that have more than three leaflets and are arranged in a low rosette. Leaves above the basal rosette are alternate, with those placed just above the basal leaves typically trifoliate, and upper leaves usually simple. These cauline leaves are serrate. Basal leaves are a darker green and are often coarsely hairy compared to the lighter green and fine hairs found on upper leaves and stems. In milder climates the foliage is evergreen.

Blooming occurs for one to two months in the summer; each flower has five white petals and five green sepals. Flowers are replaced by clusters of long, thin seeds each with a hook on one end that may catch on clothing or animal fur. The flowers resemble those of other members of the rose family such as blackberries and strawberries.

The root system consists of a taproot and rhizomes. The plants prefer light shade or partial sun and moist to dry conditions. Somewhat unusually, they are resistant to the phytotoxins released by black walnut trees and so can grow near such trees.

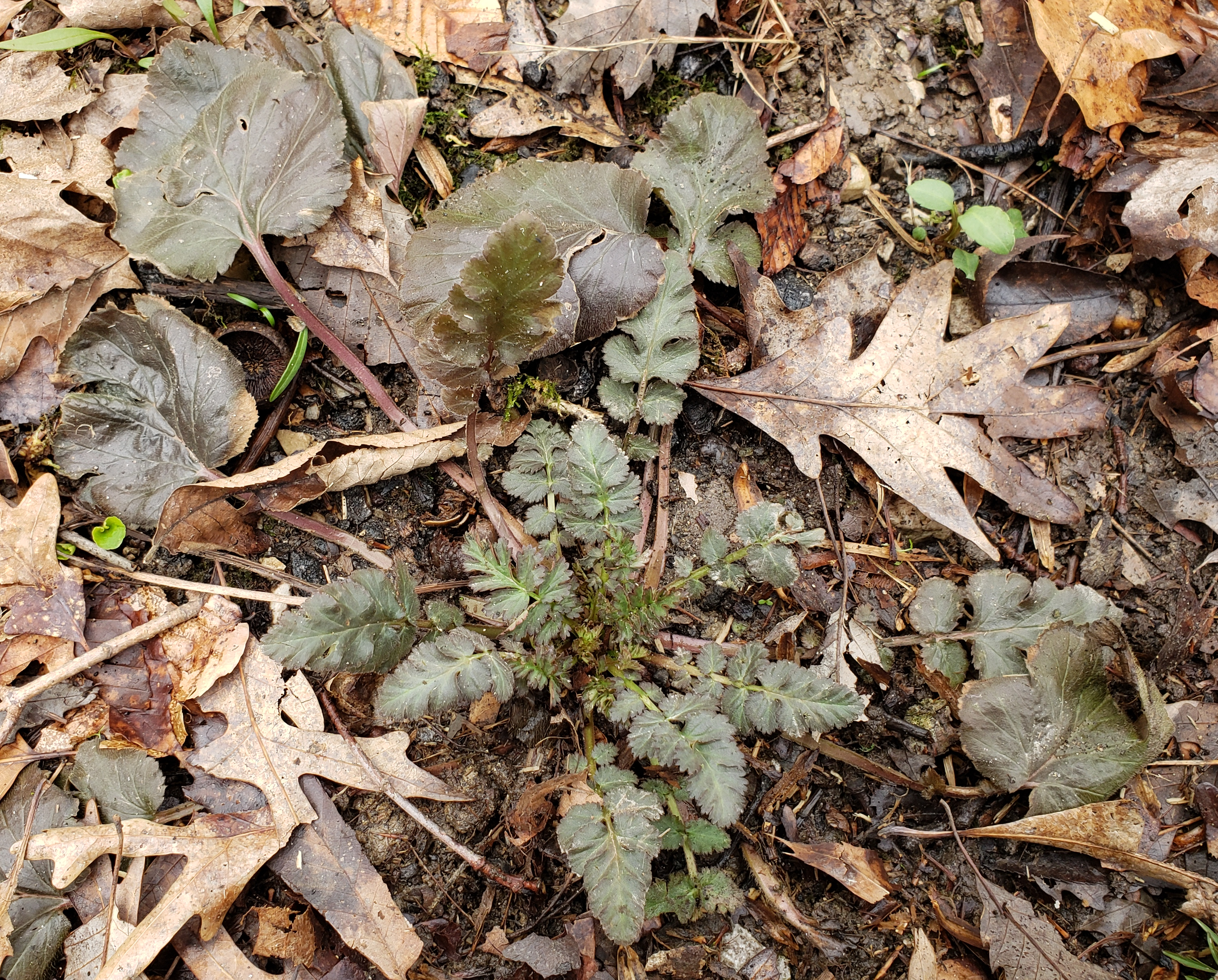
The plant during dormancy

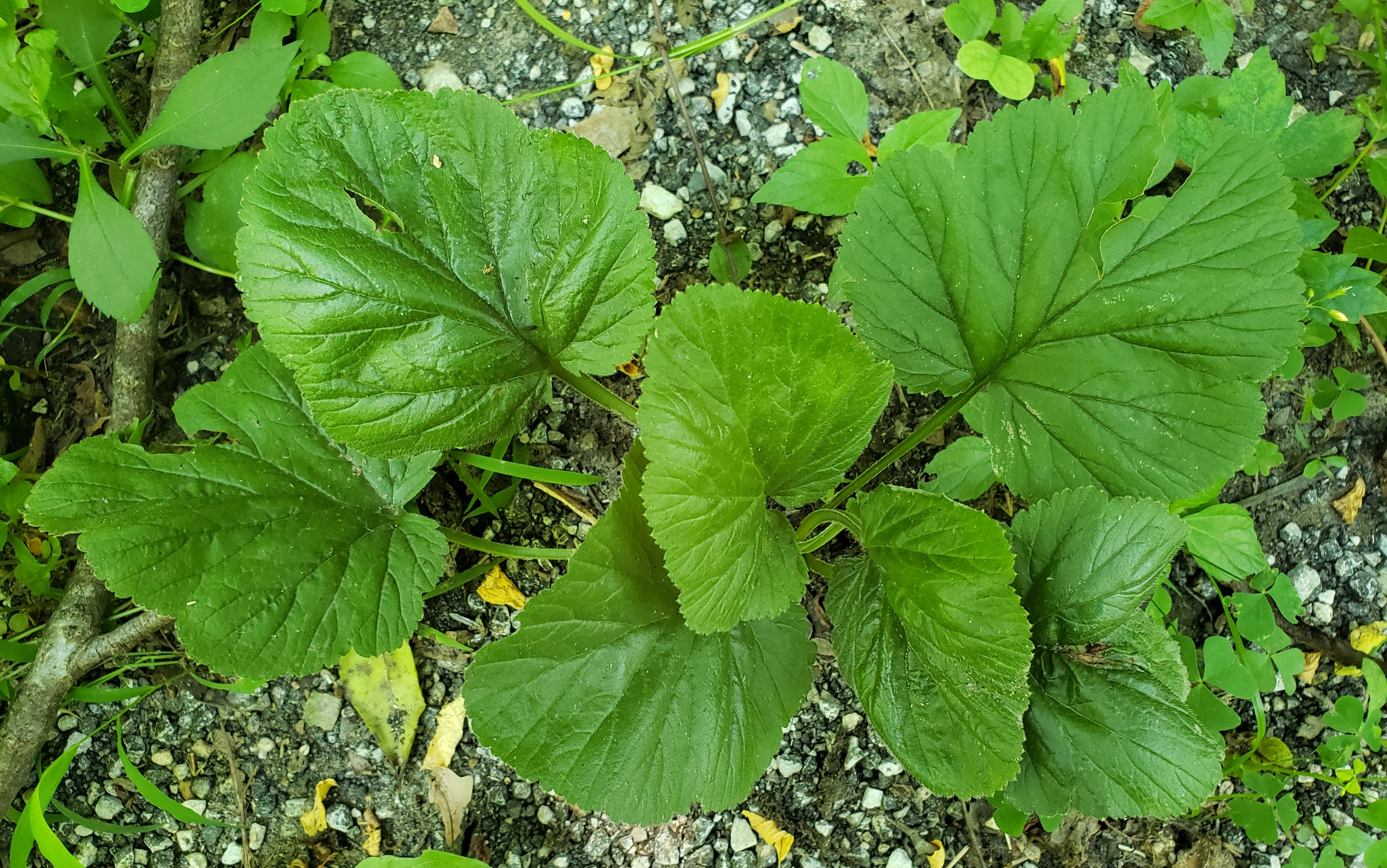
Summer growth

== Use ==
The roots have been prepared and eaten as well as used to flavor and preserve ale.
