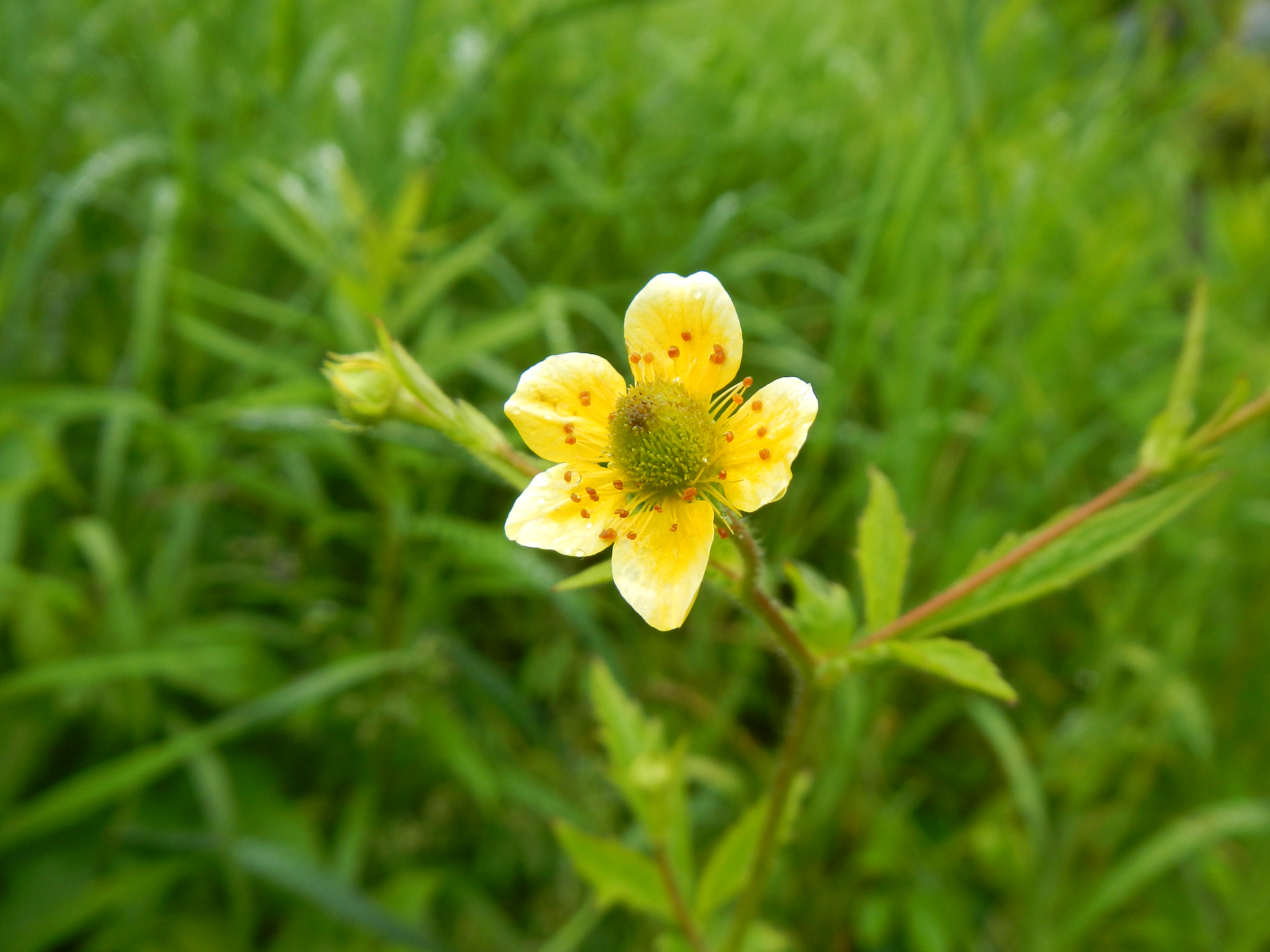

Conservation status
- Secure (NatureServe)

Scientific classification
- Kingdom: Plantae
- Clade: Tracheophytes
- Clade: Angiosperms
- Clade: Eudicots
- Clade: Rosids
- Order: Rosales
- Family: Rosaceae
- Genus: Geum
- Species: G. aleppicum

Binomial name
- Geum aleppicum Jacq.

= Geum aleppicum =

Species of flowering plant

Geum aleppicum, commonly called yellow avens or common avens is a flowering plant native to most of the temperate Northern Hemisphere, from eastern Europe across Asia and North America.

It is a herbaceous perennial plant growing to 1 metre (3 ft) tall with pinnate leaves. The flowers are 2 centimetres (0.79 in) diameter, yellow, with five to seven toothed petals.

There are two subspecies:

- Geum aleppicum subsp. aleppicum. Europe and Asia.
- Geum aleppicum subsp. strictum. North America.

== Distribution and habitat ==
It grows in forests and meadows, on grassy slopes, on river banks, in clearings and along roads.

In Europe, it is found in the Carpathians of Romania and Slovakia, in eastern Poland and the Baltic countries, Belarus, Ukraine, the wider Caucasus region and then its area extends from European Russia east across the southern half of Siberia, south up to Tienshan and to the east reaching the Pacific coast, with disjunct distributions in southern Kamchatka, Sakhalin, and northern Japan. It is widespread in the northern temperate region of China, but it can also be found across the central parts of the country and from there southwest up to Yunnan. In North America, its range extends from Alaska through western and southern Canada, most of the US states (except in the southeast), and southwards up to Mexico. It has been introduced in Scandinavia and New Zealand.
