= Greek =

Greek may refer to anything related to:

- Greece, a country in Europe
- Ancient Greece, the ancient civilization before the end of Antiquity
  - Greek mythology, a body of myths originally told by the Ancient Greeks
- Greeks, an ethnic group
- Greek language, a branch of the Indo-European language family
  - Proto-Greek or Proto-Hellenic language, the assumed last common ancestor of all known varieties of Greek
  - Hellenic languages, a branch of the Indo-European language family whose principal member is the Greek language
  - Mycenaean Greek, most ancient attested form of the language (16th to 11th centuries BC)
  - Ancient Greek, forms of the language used c. 1000–330 BC
  - Koine Greek, common form used during Classical antiquity, c. 300 BC – 600 AD
  - Medieval Greek or Byzantine Greek, spoken during the Middle Ages up until the fall of Constantinople in 1453 AD
  - Modern Greek, varieties spoken in the modern era (from 1453 AD)
- Greek alphabet, script used to write the Greek language
- Greek Orthodox Church, several Churches of the Eastern Orthodox Church

== Other uses ==
- Greek (play), a 1980 play by Steven Berkoff
- Greek (opera), a 1988 opera by Mark-Antony Turnage, based on Steven Berkoff's play
- Greek (TV series) (also stylized GRΣΣK), 2007 ABC Family channel's comedy-drama television series set at a fictitious college's fictional Greek system.
- Greek-letter organizations (GLOs), social organizations for undergraduate students at North American colleges
- Greek love, a term referring variously to male bonding, homosexuality, pederasty and anal sex
- Greek Revival architecture, an architectural movement of the late 18th and early 19th centuries
- Greek Theatre (Los Angeles), a theatre located at Griffith Park in Los Angeles, California
- Greeking, a style of displaying or rendering text or symbols in a computer display or typographic layout
- Greeks, a group of scholars in 16th-century England who were part of the Grammarians' War
- Greeks (finance), quantities representing the sensitivity of the price of derivatives
- The Greek, a fictional character on the HBO drama The Wire.
- The Greeks (book), a 1951 non-fiction book on classical Greece by H. D. F. Kitto

== See also ==
- Greek dialects (disambiguation)
- Greek to me, an idiom for something not understandable
- Greeks (disambiguation)
- Grecian (disambiguation)
- Hellenic (disambiguation)
- Name of Greece, names for the country
- Names of the Greeks, terms for the Greek people
