= Pandemis subovata =

Scientific classification
- Domain: Eukaryota
- Kingdom: Animalia
- Phylum: Arthropoda
- Class: Insecta
- Order: Lepidoptera
- Family: Tortricidae
- Genus: Pandemis
- Species: P. subovata

Binomial name
- Pandemis subovata (Diakonoff, 1970)

Synonyms
- Parapandemis subovata Diakonoff, 1970

Species of moth

Pandemis subovata is a moth of the family Tortricidae. It is found in north Madagascar.

The male of this species has a wingspan of 26 mm, the female of 35–36 mm. Their heads are pale ochreous and the forewings oblong suboval.

The male genitalia of this species are close to Pandemis stipulaceana but the female superficially resembles Pandemis capnobathra.
