= Admiralty University of Nigeria =

Federal University in Nigeria

Coordinates: 6°09′59″N 6°34′33″E

- Type: Federal
- Established: 2017
- Founder: Nigerian Navy
- Vice-Chancellor: Prof. Christopher Bankole Ndubisi Ogbogbo
- Location: Ibusa, Delta, Nigeria
- Website: https://adun.edu.ng/

Admiralty University of Nigeria (ADUN) located in Ibusa, Delta State, Nigeria, was originally established as a private university through the joint efforts of Nigerian Navy Holdings Limited and Hellenic Education of Nigeria in December 2017. The institution became a Federal University through an Act assented to by past President of the Federal Republic of Nigeria, Gen. Muhammadu Buhari (rtd.), GCFR, on 8 February 2023.

== Accredited Programmes in ADUN ==
NUC Accredited courses as of 2022:

- Cybersecurity
- Forensic Science
- Computer Science
- Software Engineering
- Conservation and Environmental Biology
- English and Literary Studies
- Accounting
- Economics
- Business Administration
- International RelationsInternational relations
- History & International Studies
- Hospitality and Tourism Studies
- Applied Physics and Renewable Energy
- Chemistry
- Industrial Mathematics
- Law

== About ADUN Library ==
The ADUN Library, officially known as the Prof. Augustine Esogbue Library, serves as the intellectual hub of Admiralty University of Nigeria. Named in honor of the distinguished scholar and academic, the library stands as a symbol of academic excellence, knowledge preservation, and digital advancement in higher education.

The library, which holds large volumes of collections in print and non-print format, is situated within the university premises. [8]

=== Branch Libraries ===
- Faculty of Science (FOS) Library
- Faculty of Arts, Management and Social Sciences (FAMSS) Library
- Faculty of Law (FOL) Library
- Satellite Campus Library

== Faculties in ADUN ==
1. Faculty of Science
2. Faculty of Arts, Management and Social Sciences
3. Faculty of Law
4. Faculty of Engineering and Engineering Technology
5. Faculty of Maritime Studies
