= Greeks (disambiguation) =

The Greeks are an ethnic group native to Greece.

Greeks or The Greeks may also refer to:

- Greeks (finance), a finance term
- The Greeks (book), 1951 non-fiction book by H. D. F. Kitto
- The Greeks (The Wire), criminal organization on the TV series The Wire

== See also ==
- Greek (disambiguation)
- List of Jupiter trojans (Greek camp)
