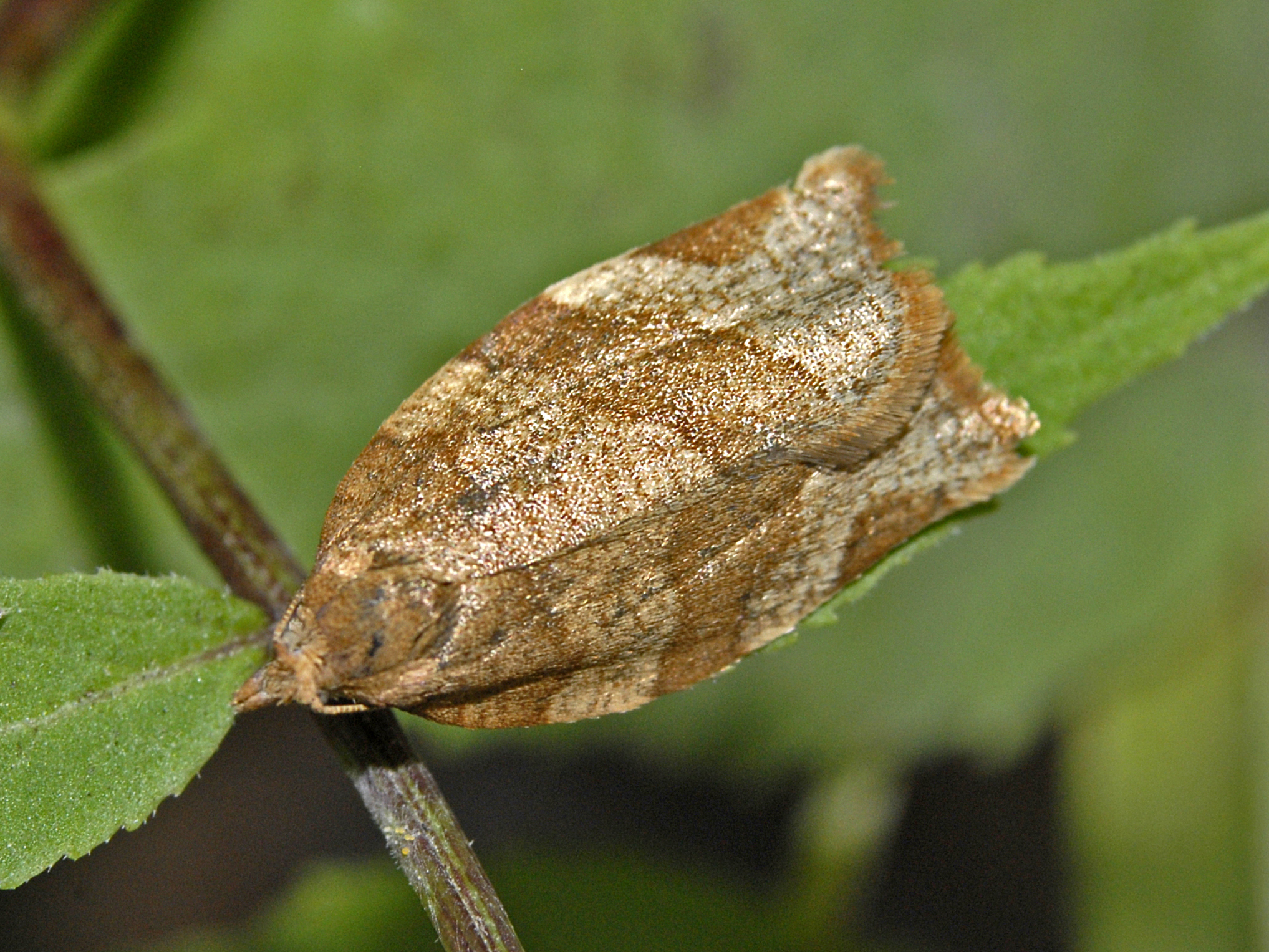

Scientific classification
- Kingdom: Animalia
- Phylum: Arthropoda
- Clade: Pancrustacea
- Class: Insecta
- Order: Lepidoptera
- Family: Tortricidae
- Genus: Pandemis
- Species: P. heparana

Binomial name
- Pandemis heparana (Denis & Schiffermüller, 1775)

Synonyms
- Tortrix heparana [Denis & Schiffermuller], 1775; Phalaena (Tortrix) cappana Villers, 1789; Phalaena (Tortrix) cappata Geoffroy, in Fourcroy, 1785; Tortrix carpiniana Hubner, [1796-1799]; Pyralis fasciana Fabricius, 1787; Tortrix heperana Gmelin, 1788; Tortrix padana Schrank, 1802; Tortrix pasquayana [Denis & Schiffermuller], 1775; Tortrix rubrana Sodoffsky, 1830; Pandemis heparana var. subclarana Caradja, 1931; vulpisana Herrich-Schaffer, 1847; Tortrix (Lozotaenia) vulpisana Herrich-Schaffer, 1851

= Pandemis heparana =

Species of moth

Pandemis heparana, the dark fruit-tree tortrix or apple brown tortrix, is a moth of the family Tortricidae.

== Distribution ==
This species can be found in most of Europe, in the eastern Palearctic realm, in the Near East, and in North America.

== Description ==
Pandemis heparana has a wingspan of 16–24 mm. In these moths the basic color of the forewings ranges from yellowish brown to reddish brown, with a reticulate pattern, a dark brown basal fascia, dark brown transversal bands, two triangular spots and brown fringes at the edge. The hindwings are gray-brown with white-yellow fringes. The larva can reach 22 mm and it is pale green.

This species is rather similar to Pandemis cerasana.

== Biology ==
These moths have two generations per year (bivoltine). The moth flies from late May to mid-September in western Europe. The larvae are considered a pest of trees and shrubs. They live in a rolled leaf and are polyphagous, feeding on various deciduous trees and shrubs including oak, willow, birch, honeysuckle, sorbus, apple and pear. Pupation takes places in the rolled leaves.

== Gallery ==
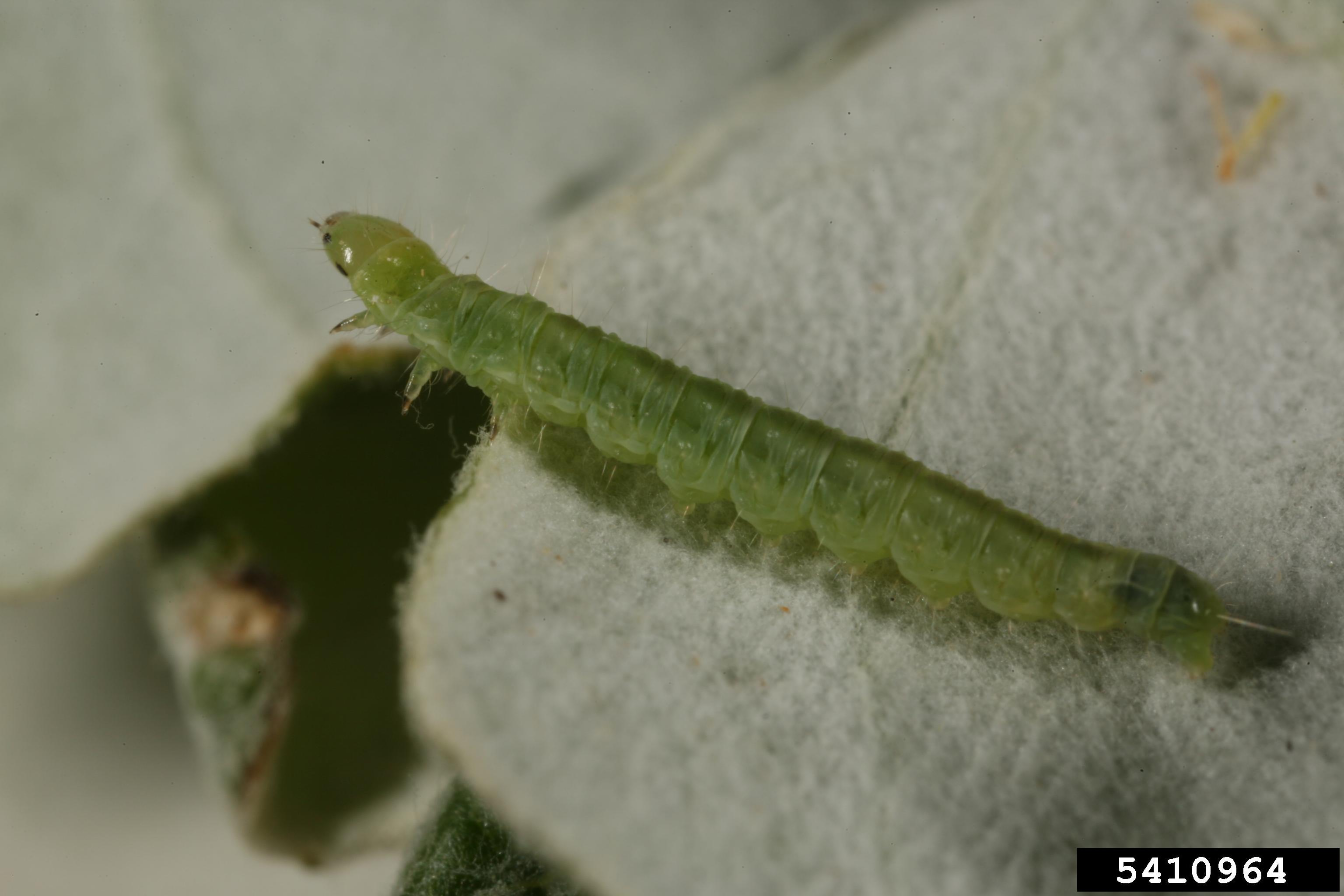
Larva

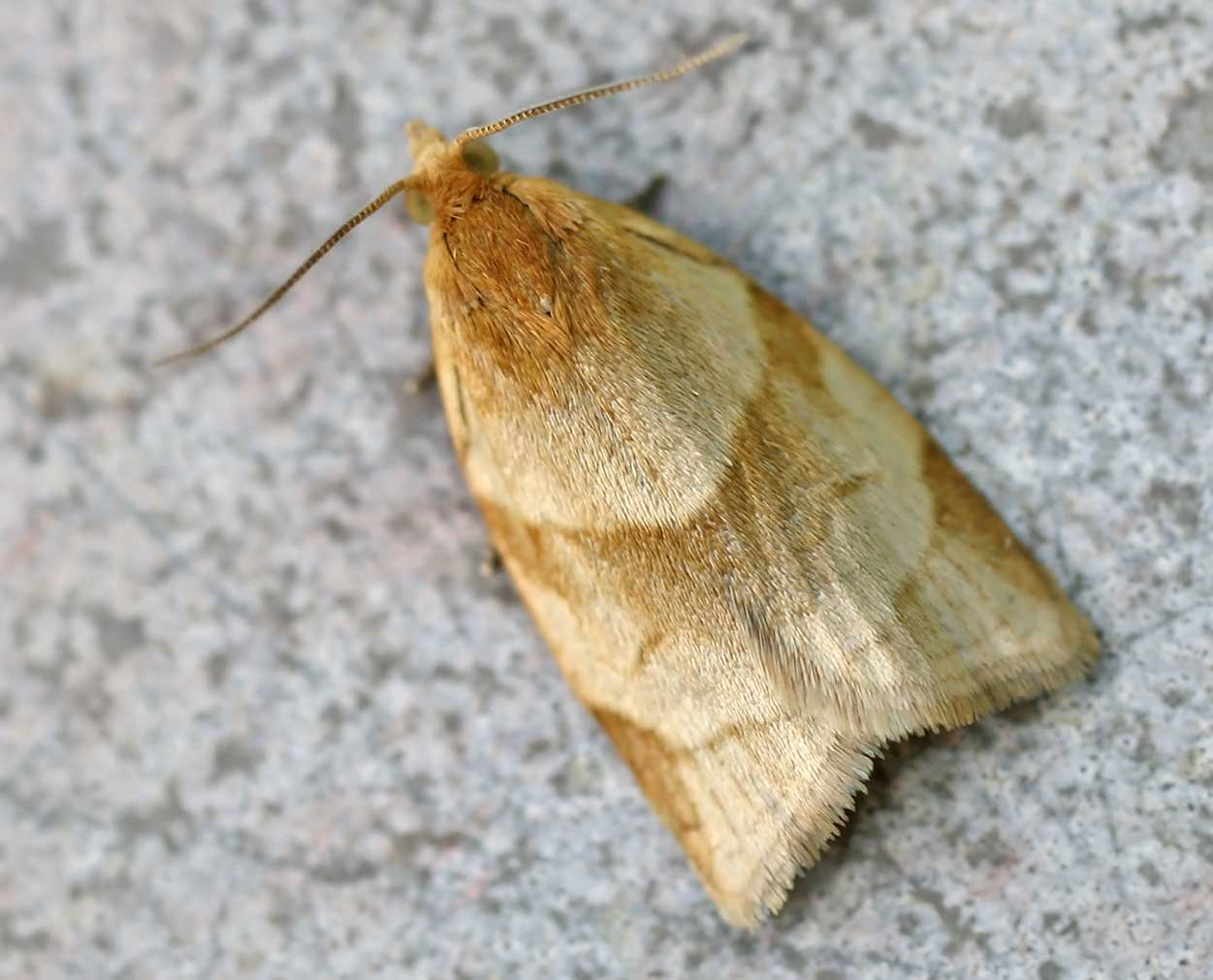
Moth

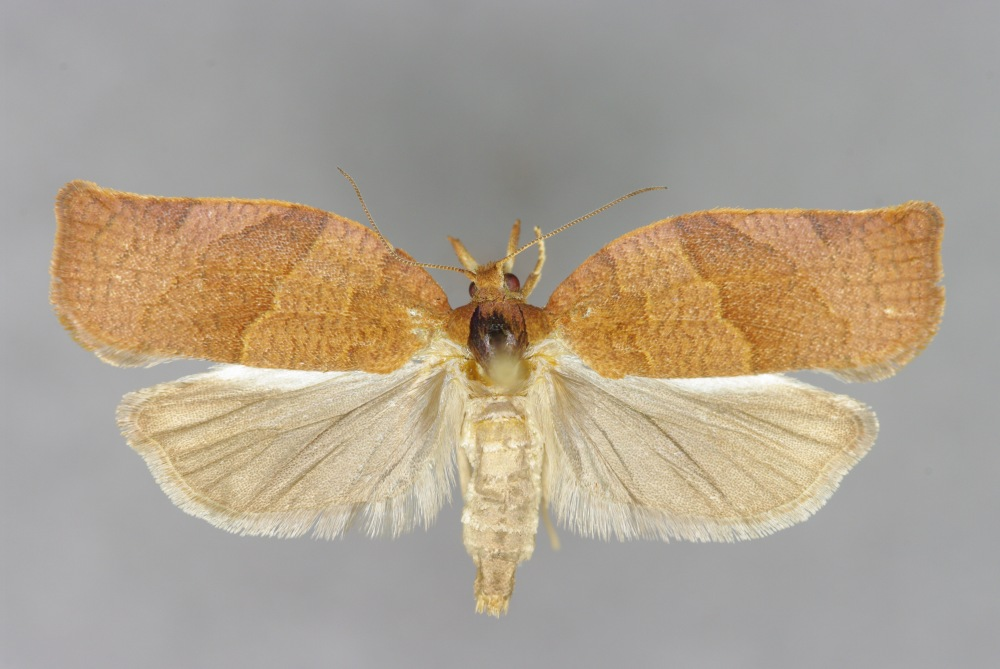
Mounted specimen
