= Grecian (disambiguation) =

Grecian is an adjective referring to characteristic of Greece, the Greeks, or their culture.

Grecian may also refer to:

- Grecian runes, an alphabet dating to Ancient Greece
- Grecian philosophy, a system of thought and aesthetics
- Grecian vase, pottery of ancient Greece
- Ode on a Grecian Urn, a poem written by John Keats in 1819

Maritime

- Grecian (ship), for list of ships with the name

Biology

- Grecian anomalous blue, a butterfly found on the Balkan Peninsula
- Grecian shoemaker, a butterfly of Central and South America
- Grecian foxglove, a poisonous plant
- Grecian juniper or Greek juniper, a large shrub
- Grecian laurel, a large aromatic shrub
- Grecian rose, Geum quellyon, a plant native to Chile

Others

- Grecian bend, a stooped posture, also a dance, named after the gracefully inclined figures seen in the art of Ancient Greece
- Grecian Coffee House, a London coffee house founded around 1665, a favoured meeting-place for members of the Royal Society
- Grecian Formula, a men's hair coloring product
- Grecian Guild Pictorial, an American physique magazine published from 1955 until 1968
- Grecian Old Style, better known as Goudy Old Style, a typeface
- Grecian Queen, an American champion Thoroughbred racehorse, foaled in 1950
- Grecian Rocks (reef), a coral reef in the Key Largo area
- Grecian Shelter, an architectural feature of Prospect Park in Brooklyn, New York
- The Grecians, nickname of Exeter City F.C.
