= Pandemis chlorograpta =

Scientific classification
- Kingdom: Animalia
- Phylum: Arthropoda
- Class: Insecta
- Order: Lepidoptera
- Family: Tortricidae
- Genus: Pandemis
- Species: P. chlorograpta

Binomial name
- Pandemis chlorograpta Meyrick, 1921

Species of moth

Pandemis chlorograpta is a species of moth of the family Tortricidae. It is found in China in the provinces of Heilongjiang, Beijing, Shaanxi, Jiangxi, Sichuan, Fujian and Zhejiang and in Japan.

The wingspan is 17.5–27 mm. Adults fly during the summer.

The larvae feed on Acer, Berberis, Betula, Citrus reticulata, Lysimachia clethroides, Malus pumila, Morus alba, Prunus species (including Prunus persica), Pyrus, Quercus, Ribes, Sorbus, Tilia, Ulmus and Geum chiloense.
