= Pandemis ianus =

Scientific classification
- Domain: Eukaryota
- Kingdom: Animalia
- Phylum: Arthropoda
- Class: Insecta
- Order: Lepidoptera
- Family: Tortricidae
- Genus: Pandemis
- Species: P. ianus

Binomial name
- Pandemis ianus (Diakonoff, 1970)

Synonyms
- Parapandemis ianus Diakonoff, 1970

Species of moth

Pandemis ianus is a moth of the family Tortricidae. It is found in north Madagascar.

The male of this species has a wingspan of 21.5 mm. Its head is tawny fuscous, palus tawny, the thorax tawny ochreous, abdomen greyish fuscous.

The forewings are suboval with a rounded costa. They are light pinkish ochreous, glossy and strewn with fuscous grey. The hindwings are golden ochreous, the posterior third with a pink suffusion and irregularly transversed by rows of dark grey dots.

The genitalia of this species are close to Pandemis capnobathra.
