= Pandemis refracta =

Scientific classification
- Domain: Eukaryota
- Kingdom: Animalia
- Phylum: Arthropoda
- Class: Insecta
- Order: Lepidoptera
- Family: Tortricidae
- Genus: Pandemis
- Species: P. refracta

Binomial name
- Pandemis refracta (Diakonoff, 1960)

Synonyms
- Parapandemis refracta Diakonoff, 1960; Parapandemis refracta borealis Diakonoff, 1960; Parapandemis refracta dormitans Diakonoff, 1960

Species of moth

Pandemis refracta is a species of moth of the family Tortricidae. It is found in Madagascar.

== Subspecies ==
- Pandemis refracta refracta
- Pandemis refracta borealis (Diakonoff, 1960)
- Pandemis refracta dormitans (Diakonoff, 1960)
