= Pandemis retroflua =

Scientific classification
- Kingdom: Animalia
- Phylum: Arthropoda
- Clade: Pancrustacea
- Class: Insecta
- Order: Lepidoptera
- Family: Tortricidae
- Genus: Pandemis
- Species: P. retroflua

Binomial name
- Pandemis retroflua (Diakonoff, 1960)

Synonyms
- Parapandemis retroflua Diakonoff, 1960

Species of moth

Pandemis retroflua is a species of moth of the family Tortricidae. It is found in Madagascar.
