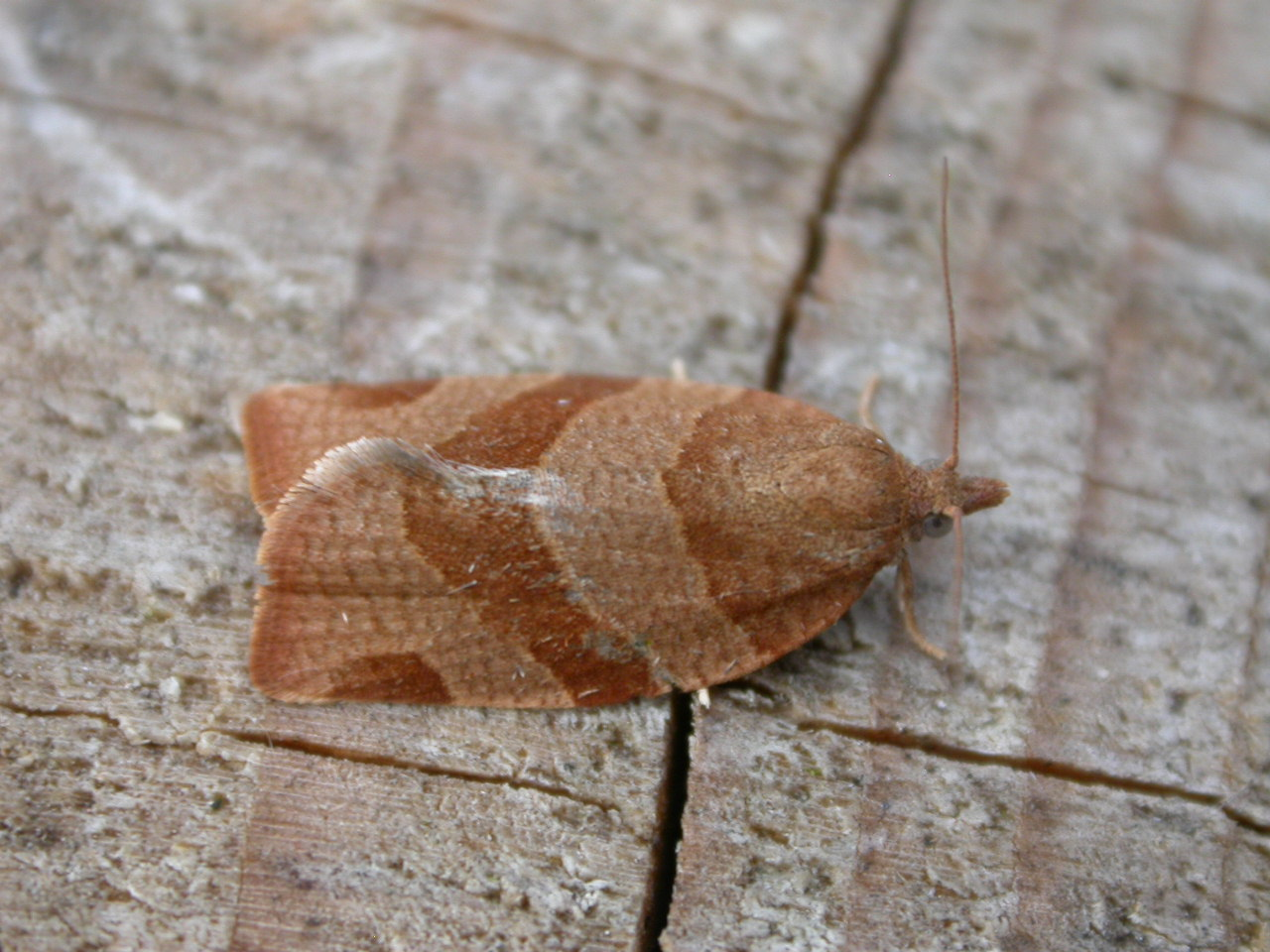

Scientific classification
- Domain: Eukaryota
- Kingdom: Animalia
- Phylum: Arthropoda
- Class: Insecta
- Order: Lepidoptera
- Family: Tortricidae
- Genus: Pandemis
- Species: P. cinnamomeana

Binomial name
- Pandemis cinnamomeana (Treitschke, 1830)

Synonyms
- Tortrix cinnamomeana Treitschke, 1830; Tortrix croceana f. basana Zerny, 1935; Tortrix croceana Hubner, [1796-1799]; Tortrix croceana Frolich, 1828

= Pandemis cinnamomeana =

Species of moth

Pandemis cinnamomeana is a moth of the family Tortricidae. It is found from Europe (except in the south) to Russia, China (Heilongjiang, Jilin, Shanxi, Shaanxi, Sichuan, Jiangxi, Hubei, Hunan, Yunnan), Korea and Japan.

The wingspan is 18–24 mm. Adults are on wing from the end of June to July in western Europe.

The larvae feed on the foliage of Abies alba, Acer, Betula, Larix, Malus pumila, Picea sitchensis, Prunus, Pyrus, Quercus, Salix, Sorbus aucuparia, Sorbus commixta, Ulmus davidiana and Vaccinium. It has also been recorded from Camellia. They live amongst spun leaves. Young larvae hibernate, development continues in May and June. Pupation occurs in June and July, in the larval habitation.
