= Pandemis chondrillana =

Scientific classification
- Domain: Eukaryota
- Kingdom: Animalia
- Phylum: Arthropoda
- Class: Insecta
- Order: Lepidoptera
- Family: Tortricidae
- Genus: Pandemis
- Species: P. chondrillana

Binomial name
- Pandemis chondrillana (Herrich-Schäffer, 1860)

Synonyms
- Lozotaenia chondrillana Herrich-Schäffer, 1860; Tortrix elsana Kennel, 1919; Tortrix eulogiana Kennel, 1919; Tortrix laurana Kennel, 1919; Tortrix praefloratana Kennel, 1901; Pandemis chondrillana ab. unicolor Obraztsov, 1942

Species of moth

Pandemis chondrillana is a species of moth of the family Tortricidae. It is found in France, Bulgaria, Romania, Ukraine, Russia, Asia Minor, Iran, Afghanistan, from Kazakhstan to Siberia, Kyrgyzstan, Mongolia and north-western China.

The wingspan is 17–24 mm for males and 20–27 mm for females. Adults have been recorded on wing from May to July.

The larvae feed on Rosa, Salix, Populus and Quercus species.
