= Pandemis xylophyes =

Scientific classification
- Kingdom: Animalia
- Phylum: Arthropoda
- Class: Insecta
- Order: Lepidoptera
- Family: Tortricidae
- Genus: Pandemis
- Species: P. xylophyes

Binomial name
- Pandemis xylophyes (Diakonoff, 1960)

Synonyms
- Parapandemis xylophyes Diakonoff, 1960

Species of moth

Pandemis xylophyes is a species of moth from the family Tortricidae, commonly known as leafroller moths. It was described in Madagascar by Alexey Diakonoff in 1960. Similar to other moths in the Pandemis genus, its larvae are typically phytophagous and act as leafrollers, using silk to fold or roll leaves into a protective shelter for feeding and pupation.
