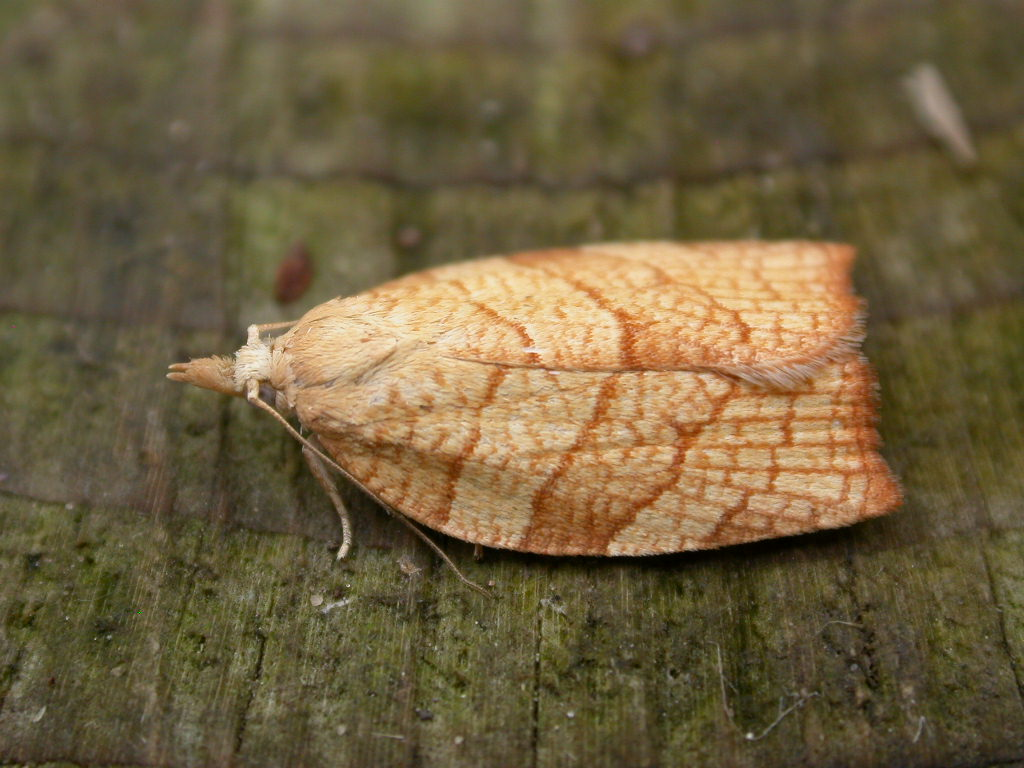

Scientific classification
- Domain: Eukaryota
- Kingdom: Animalia
- Phylum: Arthropoda
- Class: Insecta
- Order: Lepidoptera
- Family: Tortricidae
- Genus: Pandemis
- Species: P. corylana

Binomial name
- Pandemis corylana (Fabricius, 1794)

Synonyms
- Pyralis corylana Fabricius, 1794; Phalaena (Tortrix) avellana Poda, 1761; Tortrix eurythrana Fuchs, 1902; Tortrix textana Hubner, [1796-1799]

= Pandemis corylana =

Species of moth

Pandemis corylana, the chequered fruit-tree tortrix, hazel tortrix moth, filbert tortricid or barred fruit tree moth, is a moth of the family Tortricidae. It is found from northern and central Europe to Siberia, Korea and Japan.

The wingspan is 18–24 mm. It is similar to other Pandemis and Choristoneura species, but it is much paler in colour and the forewing markings are barely darker than the rest of the wing. The head and thorax are pale yellowish brown. The base colour of the forewing is pale yellowish brown with a marked brown mesh pattern. The wings, as in the related species, have marked basal blotches, an oblique cross-band in the middle and a triangular spot at the tip. These marks are barely darker than the surrounding parts, but are marked by brown edges. The hindwings are light grey and relatively narrow.

Adults are on wing from July to August in western Europe. In Korea, adults are on wing from early June to the end of September.

The larvae feed on the leaves of various deciduous trees and shrubs, including Corylus, Fraxinus, Prunus, Quercus, Rubus, Swida sanguinea, Betula, Fagus, Larix, Pinus, Rhamnus frangula, Thelycrania sanguinea and Vaccinium. Larvae can be found from May to July. Pupation occurs in the larval habitation.

It is an occasional pest of cultivated nut and fruit trees.
