= Pandemis canadana =

Scientific classification
- Domain: Eukaryota
- Kingdom: Animalia
- Phylum: Arthropoda
- Class: Insecta
- Order: Lepidoptera
- Family: Tortricidae
- Genus: Pandemis
- Species: P. canadana

Binomial name
- Pandemis canadana Kearfott, 1905

Species of moth

Pandemis canadana, the green aspen leaftier, is a moth of the family Tortricidae. The species was first described by William D. Kearfott in 1905. It is found in North America, where it has been recorded from British Columbia to Nova Scotia, south to Colorado, Illinois and Maine. The habitat consists of deciduous forests and shrubs.

The wingspan is 19–20 mm. Adults are on wing from early July to mid-August.

The larvae feed on various deciduous trees and shrubs.
