= Pandemis plutosema =

Scientific classification
- Domain: Eukaryota
- Kingdom: Animalia
- Phylum: Arthropoda
- Class: Insecta
- Order: Lepidoptera
- Family: Tortricidae
- Genus: Pandemis
- Species: P. plutosema

Binomial name
- Pandemis plutosema (Diakonoff, 1960)

Synonyms
- Parapandemis plutosema Diakonoff, 1960

Species of moth

Pandemis plutosema is a species of moth of the family Tortricidae. It is found in Madagascar.
