= Pandemis rectipenita =

Scientific classification
- Domain: Eukaryota
- Kingdom: Animalia
- Phylum: Arthropoda
- Class: Insecta
- Order: Lepidoptera
- Family: Tortricidae
- Genus: Pandemis
- Species: P. rectipenita

Binomial name
- Pandemis rectipenita Liu & Bai, 1982

Species of moth

Pandemis rectipenita is a species of moth of the family Tortricidae. It is found in China (Xizang).
