= Pandemis eustropha =

Scientific classification
- Domain: Eukaryota
- Kingdom: Animalia
- Phylum: Arthropoda
- Class: Insecta
- Order: Lepidoptera
- Family: Tortricidae
- Genus: Pandemis
- Species: P. eustropha

Binomial name
- Pandemis eustropha (Bradley, 1965)

Synonyms
- Parapandemis eustropha Bradley, 1965

Species of moth

Pandemis eustropha is a species of moth of the family Tortricidae. It is found in Uganda.
