= Pandemis crocograpta =

Scientific classification
- Kingdom: Animalia
- Phylum: Arthropoda
- Class: Insecta
- Order: Lepidoptera
- Family: Tortricidae
- Genus: Pandemis
- Species: P. crocograpta

Binomial name
- Pandemis crocograpta (Meyrick, 1933)

Synonyms
- Capua crocograpta Meyrick, 1933

Species of moth

Pandemis crocograpta is a species of moth of the family Tortricidae. It is found on Madagascar.
