= Pandemis isotetras =

Scientific classification
- Kingdom: Animalia
- Phylum: Arthropoda
- Class: Insecta
- Order: Lepidoptera
- Family: Tortricidae
- Genus: Pandemis
- Species: P. isotetras

Binomial name
- Pandemis isotetras (Meyrick, 1934)

Synonyms
- Tortrix isotetras Meyrick, 1934

Species of moth

Pandemis isotetras is a species of moth of the family Tortricidae. It is found in Equatorial Guinea (Bioko).
