= Pandemis emptycta =

Scientific classification
- Kingdom: Animalia
- Phylum: Arthropoda
- Class: Insecta
- Order: Lepidoptera
- Family: Tortricidae
- Genus: Pandemis
- Species: P. emptycta

Binomial name
- Pandemis emptycta Meyrick, 1937

Species of moth

Pandemis emptycta is a species of moth of the family Tortricidae. It is found in China.
