= Pandemis electrochroa =

Scientific classification
- Domain: Eukaryota
- Kingdom: Animalia
- Phylum: Arthropoda
- Class: Insecta
- Order: Lepidoptera
- Family: Tortricidae
- Genus: Pandemis
- Species: P. electrochroa

Binomial name
- Pandemis electrochroa (Diakonoff, 1977)

Synonyms
- Parapandemis electrochroa Diakonoff, 1977

Species of moth

Pandemis electrochroa is a species of moth of the family Tortricidae. It is found on La Réunion., an island in the Indian Ocean.
