= Pandemis monticolana =

Scientific classification
- Kingdom: Animalia
- Phylum: Arthropoda
- Clade: Pancrustacea
- Class: Insecta
- Order: Lepidoptera
- Family: Tortricidae
- Genus: Pandemis
- Species: P. monticolana

Binomial name
- Pandemis monticolana Yasuda, 1975

Species of moth

Pandemis monticolana is a species of moth of the family Tortricidae. It is found in China (Heilongjiang, Jilin), South Korea and Japan.

The wingspan is 19–25 mm.
