= Pandemis metallochroma =

Scientific classification
- Domain: Eukaryota
- Kingdom: Animalia
- Phylum: Arthropoda
- Class: Insecta
- Order: Lepidoptera
- Family: Tortricidae
- Genus: Pandemis
- Species: P. metallochroma

Binomial name
- Pandemis metallochroma (Diakonoff, 1948)

Synonyms
- Syndemis metallochroma Diakonoff, 1948

Species of moth

Pandemis metallochroma is a species of moth of the family Tortricidae. It is found in Madagascar.
