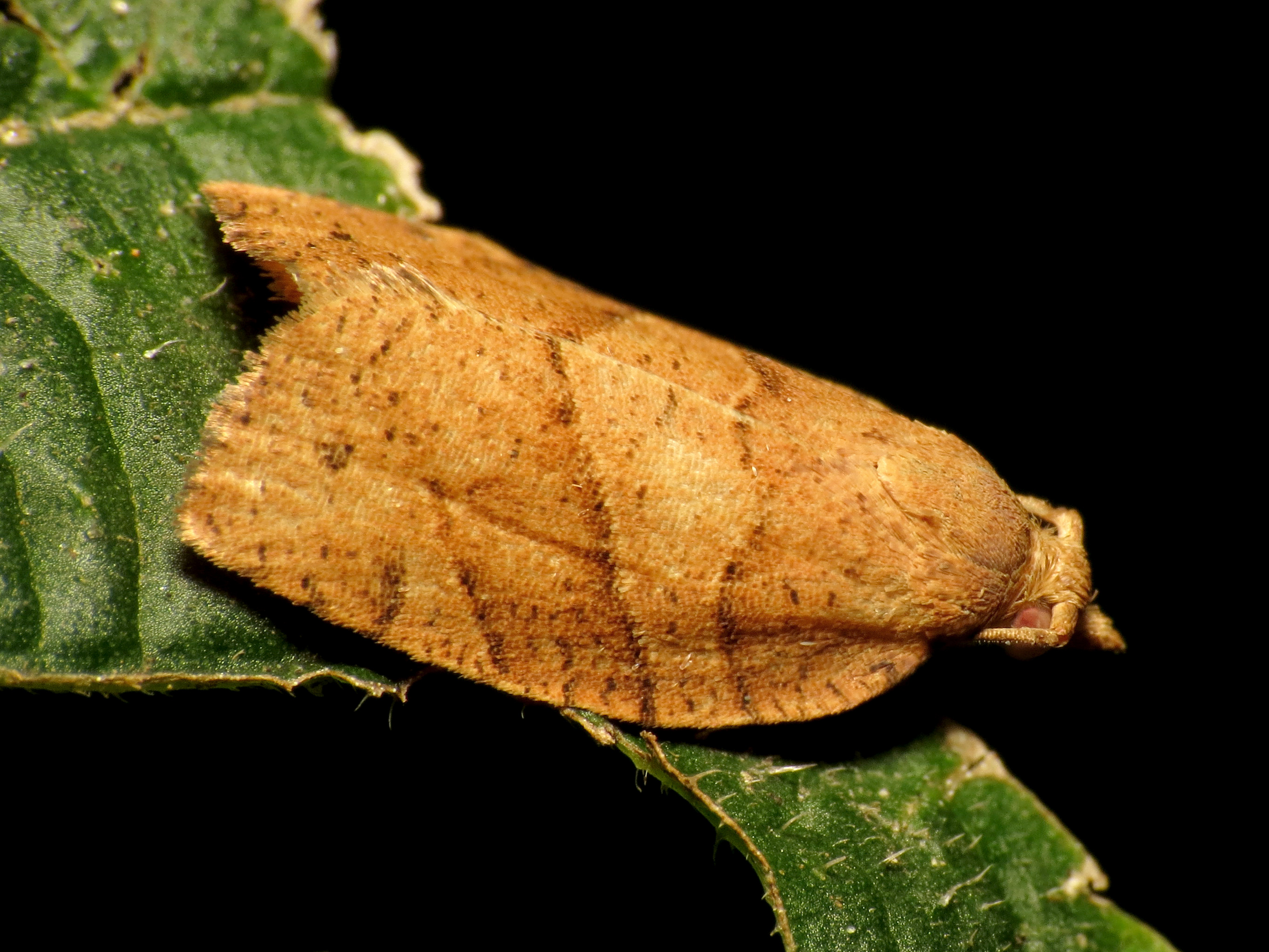

Scientific classification
- Domain: Eukaryota
- Kingdom: Animalia
- Phylum: Arthropoda
- Class: Insecta
- Order: Lepidoptera
- Family: Tortricidae
- Genus: Pandemis
- Species: P. lamprosana

Binomial name
- Pandemis lamprosana (Robinson, 1869)

Synonyms
- Tortrix lamprosana Robinson, 1869

= Pandemis lamprosana =

Species of moth

Pandemis lamprosana, the woodgrain leafroller moth, is a species of moth of the family Tortricidae. It is found in North America, where it has been recorded from the north-eastern United States, Quebec and Ontario.

The length of the forewings is 8-10.5 mm for males and 9.5–12 mm for females. Adults are on wing from late June to July in one generation per year.

The larvae feed on the leaves of various deciduous trees, including Acer rubrum, Acer saccharinum, Acer spicatum, Betula alleghaniensis, Betula papyrifera, Ostrya virginiana, Gleditsia triacanthos, Fagus species, Quercus species (including Quercus rubra), Hamamelis species, Sassafras species, Fraxinus species (including Fraxinus americana), Platanus species, Prunus virginiana, Populus tremuloides, Tilia americana, Ulmus americana and Ulmus rubra. Full-grown larvae reach a length of about 20 mm.
