= Hellenism =

Hellenism may refer to:

== Ancient Greece ==
- Hellenistic period, the period between the death of Alexander the Great and the annexation of the classical Greek heartlands by Rome
  - Hellenistic Greece, Greece in the Hellenistic period
  - Hellenistic art, the art of the Hellenistic period
  - Hellenistic Judaism, a form of Judaism in the ancient world that combined Jewish religious tradition with elements of Greek culture
  - Hellenistic philosophy, a period of Western philosophy that was developed in the Hellenistic civilization following Aristotle and ending with the beginning of Neoplatonism
  - Hellenistic religion, systems of beliefs and practices of the people who lived under the influence of ancient Greek culture during the Hellenistic period and the Roman Empire (c. 300 BCE to 300 CE)

== Modern ==
- Greek, Hellenism is distinctly tied to the Greek language.
- Greece, Hellenism constitutes the national character and culture of Greece.
- Greeks, Hellenism is uniquely tied to the Greek people as a marker of their collective identity.
- Philhellenism, the admiration of Greece and the Greeks, as well as Greek customs. As an intellectual movement of the 19th century.
- Hellenism (neoclassicism), an aesthetic movement in 18th and 19th century England and Germany
- Hellenism (modern religion), Hellenic and Hellenistic religious groups rooted in praxis, cultural values, philosophy of the Greeks and Greek history

== See also ==
- Hellenic (disambiguation)
- Hellenic studies, the study of post-classical Greece
- Hellenization, the spread of Greek culture to other peoples
- Panhellenism, the nationalism of Greeks and Greek culture
