= Pandemis pyrusana =

Scientific classification
- Kingdom: Animalia
- Phylum: Arthropoda
- Clade: Pancrustacea
- Class: Insecta
- Order: Lepidoptera
- Family: Tortricidae
- Genus: Pandemis
- Species: P. pyrusana

Binomial name
- Pandemis pyrusana Kearfott, 1907

Synonyms
- Pandemis pyrana Meyrick, 1912

Species of moth

Pandemis pyrusana, the apple pandemis or pandemis leafroller moth, is a species of moth of the family Tortricidae. The species was first described by William D. Kearfott in 1907. It is found in North America, where it has been recorded from Alberta to British Columbia, south through Idaho, Utah and Colorado and California. The habitat consists of forests with deciduous trees and shrubs.

The length of the forewings is 8–12.5 mm for males and 9.5–14 mm for females. Adults are on wing from May to July and again from September to November in coastal California in one or two generations per year.

The larvae feed on Alnus species, Betula occidentalis, Lonicera species, Cornus sericea, Ribes species, Ceanothus cuneatus, Malus species (including Malus pumila), Prunus species (including Prunus avium and Prunus virginiana), Pyrus species, Rosa species, Populus tremuloides and Salix species (including Salix lasiolepis and Salix sessilifolia).
