= Pandemis cataxesta =

Scientific classification
- Kingdom: Animalia
- Phylum: Arthropoda
- Class: Insecta
- Order: Lepidoptera
- Family: Tortricidae
- Genus: Pandemis
- Species: P. cataxesta

Binomial name
- Pandemis cataxesta Meyrick, 1938

Species of moth

Pandemis cataxesta is a moth of the family Tortricidae. It is found in China and Vietnam.
