= Pandemis piceocola =

Scientific classification
- Domain: Eukaryota
- Kingdom: Animalia
- Phylum: Arthropoda
- Class: Insecta
- Order: Lepidoptera
- Family: Tortricidae
- Genus: Pandemis
- Species: P. piceocola

Binomial name
- Pandemis piceocola Liu, 1990

Species of moth

Pandemis piceocola is a species of moth of the family Tortricidae. It is found in China (Gansu).

The length of the forewings is about 8 mm for males and 10 mm for females.

The larvae feed on Picea crassifolia.
