= Pandemis euryloncha =

Scientific classification
- Domain: Eukaryota
- Kingdom: Animalia
- Phylum: Arthropoda
- Class: Insecta
- Order: Lepidoptera
- Family: Tortricidae
- Genus: Pandemis
- Species: P. euryloncha

Binomial name
- Pandemis euryloncha (Diakonoff, 1973)

Synonyms
- Parapandemis euryloncha Diakonoff, 1973

Species of moth

Pandemis euryloncha is a species of moth of the family Tortricidae. It is found in Madagascar.
