= Pandemis striata =

Scientific classification
- Domain: Eukaryota
- Kingdom: Animalia
- Phylum: Arthropoda
- Class: Insecta
- Order: Lepidoptera
- Family: Tortricidae
- Genus: Pandemis
- Species: P. striata

Binomial name
- Pandemis striata Bai, 1994

Species of moth

Pandemis striata is a species of moth of the family Tortricidae. It is found in China (Shanxi).
