= William Beare (Latinist) =

British latinist (1900–1963)

William Beare (20 April 1900, Ireland – 1963, Bristol, England) was a British Latinist and president of the Classical Association for the academic year 1962–1963.

== Life ==
After graduating from Trinity College Dublin, William Beare became a lecturer at the University of Manchester. From 1931 until his death in 1963, he was a professor of Latin at the University of Bristol. During 1940 he sometimes lectured for the UK's Ministry of Information. From 1946 to 1949 he was Dean of the Faculty of Arts at the University of Bristol.

On 1 August 1934, William Beare married Sylvia Joan Gibson (1910–1996) in St. Asaph, Denbighshire, Wales.

For the academic year 1955–1956 he was in the United States as the Charles Norton Lecturer of the Archaeological Institute of America. During that time he lectured on Roman drama at more than 40 colleges and other institutions from Maine to California.

In 1962, the Swedish Academy accepted Beare as nominator in nominating the classicist H. D. F. Kitto for the Nobel Prize in Literature.

William Beare died in the summer of 1963. He was eulogised by G. T. W. Hooker as "a modest, sober, humane, and forthright scholar, ποθεινὸς τοῖς φίλοις."

== Selected publications ==
=== Articles ===
- Beare, W. (1928). "Plautus and his Public". The Classical Review. 42 (3): 106–111. doi:10.1017/S0009840X00036441.
- Beare, W. (1937). "Recent Work on the Roman Theatre". The Classical Review. 51 (3): 105–111. doi:10.1017/S0009840X00070724.
- Beare, W. (1939). "Seats in the Greek and Roman Theatres". The Classical Review. 53 (2): 51–55. doi:10.1017/S0009840X00088740.
- Beare, W. (1939). "The Italian Origins of Latin Drama". Hermathena. 29 (54): 30–53. JSTOR 23037929.
- Beare, W. (1940). "When did Livius Andronicus come to Rome?". The Classical Quarterly. 34 (1–2): 11–19. doi:10.1017/S0009838800009058.
- Beare, W. (1945). "Plays for Performance and Plays for Recitation: A Roman Contrast". Hermathena (65): 8–19. JSTOR 23037459.
- Beare, W. (1948). "The Roman Origin of the Five-Act Law". Hermathena (72): 44–70. JSTOR 23037719.
- Beare, W. (1953). "The Meaning of Ictus as Applied to Latin Verse". Hermathena (81): 29–40. JSTOR 23039073.
- Beare, W. (1955). "Pollicis Ictus, the Saturnian, and Beowulf". Classical Philology. 50 (2): 89–97. doi:10.1086/363892.
- Beare, W. (1956). "The Origin of Rhythmic Latin Verse". Hermathena (87): 3–20. JSTOR 23039054.
- Beare, William (1959). "The Roman Achievement". Greece and Rome. 6: 3–13. doi:10.1017/S0017383500013206.
- Beare, W. (1964). "Tacitus on the Germans". Greece and Rome. 11: 64–76. doi:10.1017/S0017383500012675.

=== Books ===
- The Roman stage: a short history of Latin drama in the time of the Republic. London: Methuen. 1950.
  - Beare, William (1968). The Roman stage (revised, 3rd ed.). Methuen. ISBN 0416295207.
  - Beare, W. (2024). The Roman Stage. doi:10.4324/9781003482192. ISBN 978-1-003-48219-2; e-book; brief description, with chapter abstracts, at taylorfrancis.com
- Latin verse and European song: a study in accent and rhythm. London: Methuen. (Beare dedicated this book to the Dutch classicist Petrus Johannes Enk. See p. 5.)
