= Pandemis acumipenita =

Scientific classification
- Domain: Eukaryota
- Kingdom: Animalia
- Phylum: Arthropoda
- Class: Insecta
- Order: Lepidoptera
- Family: Tortricidae
- Genus: Pandemis
- Species: P. acumipenita

Binomial name
- Pandemis acumipenita Liu & Bai, 1983

Species of moth

Pandemis acumipenita is a species of moth of the family Tortricidae. It is found in Sichuan, China.

The length of the forewings is about 9 mm.
