= Pandemis quadrata =

Scientific classification
- Domain: Eukaryota
- Kingdom: Animalia
- Phylum: Arthropoda
- Class: Insecta
- Order: Lepidoptera
- Family: Tortricidae
- Genus: Pandemis
- Species: P. quadrata

Binomial name
- Pandemis quadrata Liu & Bai, 1983

Species of moth

Pandemis quadrata is a species of moth of the family Tortricidae. It is found in China (Shanxi).

The length of the forewings is 9–10 mm. The forewings are light brown, with a scattered brown pattern. The hindwings are greyish brown.
