= Pandemis ignescana =

Scientific classification
- Domain: Eukaryota
- Kingdom: Animalia
- Phylum: Arthropoda
- Class: Insecta
- Order: Lepidoptera
- Family: Tortricidae
- Genus: Pandemis
- Species: P. ignescana

Binomial name
- Pandemis ignescana (Kuznetsov, 1976)

Synonyms
- Archips ignescana Kuznetsov, 1976

Species of moth

Pandemis ignescana is a species of moth of the family Tortricidae. It is found in the Russian Far East (Primorsky Krai) and Japan.

The wingspan is about 9 mm for males and 10 mm for females.

The larvae feed on Abies veitchii, Abies nephrolepis and Picea ajanensis.
