= Pandemis straminocula =

Scientific classification
- Kingdom: Animalia
- Phylum: Arthropoda
- Clade: Pancrustacea
- Class: Insecta
- Order: Lepidoptera
- Family: Tortricidae
- Genus: Pandemis
- Species: P. straminocula

Binomial name
- Pandemis straminocula (Diakonoff, 1960)

Synonyms
- Parapandemis straminocula Diakonoff, 1960; Parapandemis straminocula var. plectopa Diakonoff, 1960

Species of moth

Pandemis straminocula is a species of moth of the family Tortricidae. It is found in Madagascar.
