= Igbuzo =

- Nicknames: Igbuzo-Isu, Isu Na Mbagu, Isu Fulu Ogu Ju Nni
- Location within Nigeria
- Coordinates: 6°11′0″N 6°38′0″E
- State: Delta state

Government
  - Governor: Dr. Senator Ifeanyi Okowa

Population (2009)
  - Total: 566,310
- National language: Igbo
- Website: http://www.ibusa.net/mysite/aboutibusa.html

Igbuzo (Ibusa) (Igbo: Igbo Bi n’Ụzo is an Igbo community in Delta State, Nigeria, founded c. 1450. The community is in Oshimili North. It has an estimated population of 566,310 people in 2009. The people speak the Enuani dialect of the Igbo language. The name of the community is more commonly and officially known and written as Ibusa. The movements forming the process of Ibusa can be linked to the first and second waves of the movement of Igbo migrants into the West Bank of the Niger River. The first adventure was led by Edini from Nshi (Nri) and the second of the two waves of migrations was led by Umejei from Isu resulting in the formation of Igbuzo.

== History ==
=== Pre-colonial history ===
The name "Ibusa" is an Anglicization of Igbuzọ and/or Ibuzọ "Igbo bi n'ụzọ", meaning the Igbos that live by the wayside or "Were you the first to settle here?" (Ibuzo). All the names that the community bear today were foisted on them by other people. "Igbuzo" was a name used to describe the settlement by the Igbo from Nri, "Ibuzo" by Ogwashi-Uku, Asaba, Oko, Ilah and Okpanam, who are the community's immediate neighbours, and "Ibusa" by the early European missionaries who found it difficult to effectively pronounce the name of the community.

Igbo historians such as Emeka Esogbue (of Ibusa origin) and C. N. Ugochukwu (Nnewi origin) share the opinion that groups who left Benin with Ezechima and journeyed Eastward might have settled in Igbuzo considering the geographical location of the town. The implication of this, therefore, is that this new set of settlers could have been sick or generally lacking in interest in furthering their journey, this could also have resulted in their final settlement in not too distant Onitsha. This new group of settlers in Igbuzo might have become assimilated by the Umejei and Edini groups.

=== Oral history ===
Ibusa is a federation of two units known as “the Umejei and Ogboli settlements. According to the oral history of the town, Umejei Nwa Eze Isu (Prince Umejei of Isu) killed his opponent in a traditional wrestling bout, an act considered “Alu” (Abomination) in the land and punishable by death. However, his death was commuted by his father who was also Eze Isu) the king of Isu and he was encouraged to go on exile with a gourd prepared and given to him by his father. Umejei was emphatically instructed to settle wherever the pot dropped, he thus set off with friends, relations and sympathizers who accompanied him. The gourd however dropped at the present site of Ani-Oshe in Omeze (Umueze) where he founded Igbuzo.

The Ogboli factor has it that at Nshi (Nri) Odaigbo slept with one of his father's wives but Eze Nshi commuted the mandatory death sentence to exile. His father, mother and younger brother, Edini voluntarily opted to accompany him. Odaigbo and Edini were given one pot each and charms by Eze Nshi with the instruction to settle wherever the pot fell and on crossing the River Niger, Edini's pot fell at Ani-Nshi (Nri) Ogboli in Ibusa. Odaigbo's pot was to fall at the present site of Ogwashi-Uku where he also settled. The groups (Umejei and Edini later became one and are known as Ibusa) The Ogboli of Igbuzo are thus regarded as part of the larger Nri (Nshi) community. The two communities of Edini and Umejei aspects later became known as Ibusa.

The Anioma people of Delta state, regard and praise Ibusa as a group of people who often refuse food in other to prosecute wars (Isu (Igbuzo) fu ogu ju nni). This statement authenticates the bravery of these people in wars. Ibusa historians are currently researching the history of wars fought by the Igbuzo people, especially in the homes of their Isu kiths and kin in Nnewi, present Anambra State to determine whether any relationship exists between the two communities.

== Anglicization of name ==
"Ibusa" is an Anglicisation of "Igbuzo" and/or Ibuzo by the early British missionaries and visitors to the town as a result of the difficulty in pronunciation. The Anglicization of the name of the town may have been effected in the 19th century following the Ekwumekwu Wars that the community-led. "Ibusa" was considered more distinctive by the British, thus was adopted as the official name of the town and made to appear in all the official documents of the colonial government. The name "Igbuzo" - Igbo bi na uzor, meaning "the Igbo living along the way or road" - is, however, the native name of the town as used only by the natives today.

The nickname of the town is, however "Isu Na Mba Ogu" (Warriors from Isu), or colloquially Igbuzo-Isu (The Igbo-uzo(r) from Isu). Igbuzo is uniquely addressed with different names and even made noticeable with different spellings such as Ibusa, Igbuzo, Igbouzo, Igbuzor, Ibuzor, Ibuza and Ibuzo. This is believed to have been necessitated by the strategic location of the town along the busy roads and the history of the settlement of the people.

=== Ibusa today ===
The Federation of Ibusa is today constituted by ten Quarters or villages thus the common reference to the town as “Igbuzo ebi Ili” These ten Quarters are Umuekea, Umuodafe, Umuidinisagba, Umueze, Umuehea, Ogbeowele, Anyalabum (i.e. Ezukwu and Achalla-Igbuzo), Umuagwu, Umuezeagwu and Ogboli. The Ibusa town is today a federation of two autonomous settlements with different origins, the Igbuzo settlement and the Ogboli settlement in what Prof. M. A. Onwuejeogwu has illustrated as a friendship alliance which has developed into a complicated political union, a political union that has undergone many processes which today constitute the unwritten constitution of Ibusa. It has also been historically noted that at the beginning, the Ibusa-Ogboli federal knit had its Diokpa because the settlements have different origins, so they have different ofo. Today, the entire Ibusa clan have a single Diokpa and ofor. In 1936, the Ibusa-Ogboli union was threatened owing to a dispute as both settlements threatened to suspend marriage, but this was soon resolved amicably as both groups have continued to live in oneness.

Greetings in Ibusa are quite remarkable and usually follow a pattern of whether one is an indigene of any particular quarter or not. In Umuekea Quarter, for instance, while a native is greeted with "Omogwu", a woman being married in that quarter is exclusively greeted with "Oliofe." Familiarity is, therefore, necessary before salutation is paid in the native way of the town. The native kinds of greeting stand out the Igbuzo people and remind the people of their history and tradition.

Emeka Esogbue in his writings has advocated for more insightful research aimed at actually determining the particular Isu town in Igbo (southeast) that Umejei originated from. This, he argues will enable the people to ascertain their true kith and kin. Authorities of Igbo History and sometimes prominent sons and daughters of different Isu towns of the South-East have at one time or the other laid claims to several Isu communities as the place of origin of Prince Umejei, a co-founder of Ibusa. Prominent among these towns are Isu Awka in Anambra State, Isu Njaaba near Owerri in Imo State and probably Isu Anaocha in Anambra State.

For administrations and the purpose of determining the successor to the Obuzor throne as defined by the famous Supreme Court ruling on Diokpa vs Obuzor, the various Quarters of Ibusa are classified into three categories, thus:

- Otu Odogwu-Umueze and Anyallabum
- Otu Uwolo-Ogboli, Umuagwu, Umuidinisagba and Umuodafe
- Otu Iyase-Umuehea, Ogbeowele, Umuezeagwu, and Umuekea.

The Supreme Court later classified these War Lords as a ruling house for the determination of the Obuzor of the town.

=== The Ibusa traditional life ===
How the community people carried wars into Nnewi in defence of Isu and Nri people of the town considered their ancestral brothers and sisters until the coming of the British is well recorded by C. N. Ugochukwu. Igbuzo played a prominent role in Ekumeku War (1883–1914) an uprising directed against the British imperialism in Western Igboland and attempts by the Royal Niger Company to impose trade and taxation on the people. Ibusa was to play a very prominent role in prosecuting the wars in favour of Anioma and was the first of such Anioma towns to engage the British in the war in 1898. Fearing what befell the great Benin Empire in 1897, Igbuzo fiercely came all out to defend itself and other Anioma towns against the British Royal Niger Company forces commanded by Major Festing. Ibusa was subjugated after long-standing battles but the British forces sustained casualties this led to the emergence of "Ibusa" in the Dictionary of the British parliament as what punitive measures to mete to the town was for weeks debated in Britain.

After the battles, the British in admiration of the stoutness of the town established St. Thomas’ College, the first Higher Institution of Learning in Delta state in 1928, which made Ibusa an important educational centre from where missionary evangelism spread to other Anioma towns and communities and beyond. The establishment of St. Augustine's Catholic Church in 1898 by the French Missionaries was led by Father Cario Zappa.

== Culture ==
Before the advent of Christianity in Ibusa, the Ibusa practised Odinani but the people are now largely Christians, but adherents of traditional religion still exist. It is therefore not uncommon to find people placing a high priority on observation of traditions during the funerals of their loved ones etc. The Eternal Sacred Order of Cherubim and Seraphim, the Celestial Church of Christ, Living Faith Church a.k.a. Winners Church, The Redeemed Christian Church of God, Christ Embassy, Ngozi Sabbath Mission, Deeper Life Bible Church, Christ Holy Church (Odozi Obodo), Christ Apostolic Church (CAC), The Apostolic Church are some of the numerous churches located in the town.

The people place high cultural value on the kola nut in discharging their traditional responsibilities. For instance, a visitor who rejects the acceptance of kola nut may have slighted his host. Kolanut is also used in observing traditional prayers and may be the first item used in welcoming guests at social gatherings before the commencement of discussions.

For many centuries, Oboshi, Atakpo, Oduche, and Asiama streams remained major sources of water to the people, but Oboshi and Atakpo stand out as streams venerated as deities. These two streams are venerated because of the powers with which they have protected not only the people but the whole town, according to the belief of the people. As a result, the people of Igbuzo as result forbid the eating of fish from the Oboshi River. The Chief Priest of Oboshi is “Ohene”, popularly called Ohene-Mmili. The last of the Ohene, Ohene Ezedi, died on 7 January 2009.

== Ethnic identity ==
Not a few Igbuzo indigene differ in the Igbo origin of the Igbuzo people. Recently, the Daily Sun newspaper in an interview series titled "Anioma cannot deny being Igbo. We will be irrelevant politically if we do" published on Wednesday, April 7, 2010, captured differing opinions of two political stalwarts from the community with regard to the issue of ethnic identity of the people of Igbuzo. Chief Mike Nduka Okwechime, the National President of Izu Anioma, had reportedly told a local publication: "We may speak a dialect of Igbo but we are not culturally and socially Igbos by Ohaneze's definition." In reaction Obi Modestus Nwaka, President of Ohaneze Ndigbo, Delta State stated that "Our origin has never been in doubt before and after the civil war" while referring to the appointment of Anioma-born Amb. Ralph Uwechue's leadership of Ohaneze Ndigbo.

== The Ibusa festivals ==
The people of Ibusa celebrate several festivals such as Iwu, Ine, Ulor, and Ekwensu but the Iwu festival, annually celebrated by the Umuadafe and Ogbeowelle Quarters of the town, is the most popular of them all. That of Umuadafe is celebrated annually in December (around the Christmas period) drawing the attention of numerous people from far and near to the town. The festival is aimed at cleansing and purifying the town as a whole and songs and to thank the Almighty God for abundant harvest which the farmers of the town may have experienced all through the year. During this festival, traditional songs are also composed to ridicule defaulters of the norms and traditions of the society no matter their social standing in the town. Ohene (Chief Priest) and Eze-Iwus are expected to perform some rituals of the cleansing of the town to properly take place.

Evidence from Ibusa historians suggest that the Iwaji festival celebrated by the people of Ibusa may have been imported from the neighbouring Anioma town of Okpanam, in Delta State, and the Ichu-Ulor (Ulor festival) celebrated by Ezukwu, Umuodafe, Umuekea, Umuidinaisagba, Ogbeowele and Umueze Quarters of the town from Aballa and Ndokwa communities respectively. Ifejioku is another annual festival often traditionally celebrated by indigenes. Uchu-Ulor in Ibusa is annually celebrated in August.

The people have vast cultures and celebrations are unique but yet to be fully exploited by the state government. One such event is the popular Iwu Festival being celebrated by Ogbeowele and Umuodafe respectively. The Iwu festival is held annually at the end of the farming period to thank God who made it possible for them to see the farming year run out. Iwu is believed to have been brought to Ibusa by Oyana of Adigwe/Okonkwo family in of Umuwor Ogbeowele quarter of the town. The Ogwa (shrine) where it was first celebrated can still be found by the entrance in Umuwor, Ogbeowele. The principal actors of the festival are three Eze Iwu and an Ohene. The event starts with four days of absolute silence when no noise is entertained, or it attracts a penalty which ranges from kola nuts to a fine of a goat which in those days happens to be the highest fine. During this period, okanga dance from other quarters is diverted to another route, there is also no marriage as it also serves as a period of Lent and purification of the land.

== Geography ==
Geographically, "Ibusa is a dusty, hilly little town", bounded to the North-East by Asaba which hosts the capital of the State, and Ogwashi-Uku to the West, North-West by Azagba, to the North by Okpanam, East by Okwe, South-East by Oko, South by Aballa and South-West by Olodu. However, Igbuzo is lacking in terms of land mass, thus congested with houses. Historians believe that the Ibusa were the first to settle around the Asaba-Igbuzo-Ogwashi-Uku axis hence the other name of the town, Ibuzor (Were you the first to settle?) Ibusa is located in close proximity to busy towns such as Asaba, Ogwashi-Uku, Ubulu-Uku, Ilah, Ebu, Oko, Issele-Asagba and Okpanam. Thus, it is considered one of the fastest growing and developing Anioma (Delta North) towns and villages.

== Education ==
There are important educational institutions in Ibusa which include Federal Government Girls' College, St. Augustine's College and Ibusa Girls Secondary school, Umejei Primary School formerly Sacred Heart Primary School, Ibusa founded in 1908. Ibusa boasts of some of the oldest schools in the southern part of the country. The once St. Thomas' Teachers' training College located founded and located in the town in 1928 was the oldest higher institution in Delta State as a whole.

it is also worthy of note that Ibusa is reported some time ago from an unverified source to have over 100 Professors. The naval owned Admiralty University named Admiralty University of Nigeria is also sited in Ibusa.

== Transport and trade ==
The construction of an International Airport which will serve international purposes is currently going on in Asaba, Delta State, a town just about 6 miles from Ibusa and Ibusa will benefit immensely from the services of this transportation system, for now, the town heavily relies on cabs and okada motorcycle taxis as the mainstay of transportation. The major streets in Ibusa are Umejei Road, Kefas Road, Isieke High Street and Jerry Useni Road. The former houses almost all the banks in the town such as Union Bank of Nigeria Plc, Bank PHB, Umejei Micro-Finance Bank and NOPOV Micro-Finance Bank. The NOPOV Micro-Finance Bank has since gone out of service in Ibusa.

== Ibusa in politics ==
Despite its many successes recorded in many aspects of national life, Ibusa is lagging in the area of politics. However, since 1960, Ibusa has produced four Ambassadors (Ambassador Uchuno (Late), Ignatius Olisemeka, Kehinde Olisemeka (late) and Okobi) while producing Senator Nosike Ikpo during the Second Republic who also was one of the founding leaders of Anioma Movement; a group pushing for the creation of Anioma State in then Bendel state alongside Late Chief Obi Obanua Nwaukor (The Odoziani 1 of Ibusa) and Late Chief W.U Ikolodo (Uwolo of Ibusa). Nonetheless, the town is beginning to record major successes in this area as Senator, Barr. Peter Onyeluka Nwoboshi an indigene of the town was the former chairman of the People's Democratic Party, Delta State chapter and the current Senator representing Delta North at the National Assembly, Prof Patrick Utomi, the presidential flagbearer of African Democratic Congress also hails from Ibusa while the former Minority Leader of Delta State House of Assembly, Pat Ajudua is also a daughter of Igbuzo. Professor Fidelis Oditah and Mr Peter Okocha also showed interest in the elections held in 2007, presenting their bids under different party platforms for the gubernatorial race of Delta State. Obi (Prof) Chike Onwuachi has also contested the presidential election in the country. The 2011 gubernatorial elections in Nigeria saw the emergence of Paul Obanua the son of late Chief Obanua Nwaukor contesting under the platform of CDC for the office of Governor Delta state. His candidacy was well received across the state.

During the 2011 INEC registration exercise, Ibusa was reported as one of the towns with faulty DDC machines at some registration centres that could not be repaired by engineers but a supervisor with the Commission said that all hopes were not lost.

=== Taboos ===
The indigenous people of Igbuzo appear to have unexplainable special closeness, bond and love for themselves, which create a very high level of trust and relationship among them. This is reflected in the policies and ways of life of the natives; for instance, surrounding the house or any structure with fences in the town is forbidden. In the recent past, arresting a fellow Ibusa man or woman with the police was banned and only recently did the town reconsider and allow its natives to dispose of personal landed properties situated in the town to non-natives. Some natives of the town though still consider arresting fellow Ibusa natives with the police or resorting to the court of law for breaking a taboo. The reason is that the town was established by a family. The way of life in this town has been described as closely knit, a legacy that continues. The Igbuzo people refer to themselves singly as "Onye-Igbuzo," "Nwa-Onye-Igbuzo-Isu" collectively as "Ndi-Igbuzo" and traditionally add the prefix "Nwa" before family names, clans, Quarters as the case may be.

It is also highly forbidden for an Igbuzo native to eat or come anywhere near "Eyi" (Rabbit), "Edi" (Hyena) Bringing the animals anywhere near an Igbuzo man or woman may also be taken as a serious slight, abuse of rights or an act to particularly undermine him/her. some Quarters of the town such as Umuekea and Ogbeowele may also forbid "Nmanya Nkwu" (Palm wine) perhaps because it is forbidden by the Oboshi stream.

=== Dispute in traditional leadership/Supreme Court ruling ===
Following a declaration in a letter by certain people who identified themselves as kingmakers to the government of Delta State, requesting that the approval and appointment of Professor Louis Chelunor Nwaoboshi be made as the Obuzor of Ibusa and staff of office given to him, the Delta state Government in a letter dated June 20, 1995, confirmed the appointment of Professor Louis Nwaoboshi as the Obuzor of Ibusa but this was soon protested against by Obi (Professor) Chike Onwuachi who would also commence a certiorari proceedings in which he asked the court to quash the declaration. He called on the state government to prevail on Nwoboshi to stop parading himself as the Obuzor of Ibusa, claiming that he was foisted on the people. The Supreme Court in its judgment held that three Ruling Houses existed in the town in other of seniority as follows: Otu Odogwu, Otu Uwolo and Otu Iyase. Justice Samson Uwaifo in his leading judgment however declared that the Obuzor title of Igbuzo should rotate in other of seniority of the ruling houses.

Thus, by Legal Notices numbers 6,7,8 and 9 of 1995 published in the Delta State of Nigeria, Extraordinary Gazette No.28 VoI. I 5 June 1995, the Delta State Government stated the customary law regulating succession to the title of Obuzor of Igbuzo. Professor Nwaoboshi's appointment as the traditional Ruler of Igbuzo town in Delta state was consequently confirmed by the Supreme court ruling^{5} Though this has come to split the town, producing two separate camps with almost two distinct cultural differences and beliefs with each camp trying to champion, validate and make imposition of its course on the other. The members of these two distinct groups are today called "Otu Diokpa" (The Senior Diokpa Group) and "Otu Obuzor" The Obuzor Group). The members of Otu Diokpa have constantly maintained that the notion leading to the conception of the Obuzor title was merely to see such a candidate act as "Onu-Diokpa" (Messenger of the Senior Diokpa) The senior Diokpa was until the appointment and confirmation of the Obuzor the traditional head of the town. This controversy has remained unaddressed till today with both parties not wanting to shift grounds.

== Modern Igbuzo life ==
In the United States in 2008, Nonyelum Nvene Ogbodo who represented Delta State as Miss Nigeria, announced her intention to take part in the adoption of the town of Ibusa. She pointed out the legacy of extreme pride in the importance of family by the people of Igbuzo, the annual local event that takes place in the town such as the "Iwu Festival" as her reasons for doing so. She, however, described Igbuzo as underdeveloped without administrative presence, mechanical energy or good roads that could contain multi-numbered vehicles for both incoming and outgoing traffic. She would seem determined to make adoption of Ibusa to lend a helping hand because of the great potential that can be seen as far as development advancing goes and also help bring the Iwu Festival of the town to the attention of the world. Finally, she submitted that "as technology advances and time progresses, it will be a matter of time until the village of Ibusa reaches a good level of its potential. One day it could be a major attraction of greater area of Asaba, maybe even a capital village"

In an article in This Day entitled "Ibusa: Millionaires paradise", 25 October 2008, Igbuzo was adjudged thus:

"The quintessential millionaires' haven. This is reflected in the choice of mansions in the rustic community. Scattered around its rustic landscape are palatial mansions built by wealthy indigenes who earn their living from outside the town. In Ibusa, modern architectural masterpieces stand in sharp contrast with sun-baked mud homes adorned with rusty corrugated zinc roofs of less endowed relatives".

The combination of ancient and modern interpiece in the town has also drawn comparison to poignant images in J.P. Clark's poem "Ibadan".

== Electricity In Ibusa ==
The community which is under the Benin Electricity Distribution Company's (BEDC) franchise areas has been experiencing a drought of electricity for about seven years now, culminating in the development of various conspiracy theories as to the reason for the outage. Over time, the residents of Ibusa have decried the power outage, constantly lamenting its negative effects on their lifestyle.

The power outage was blamed on the fact that the town could not meet the revenue target of the power company (then NEPA) which led to them concentrating the power supply on the state capital and other major cities.

As at December 2015, a contract was awarded by the state government to Kainene Olisa services for the rehabilitation of the electricity network of the Ibusa town. After which, electricity was restored, only for them to be plunged back into darkness again after two months. This happened, not surprisingly, because the residents couldn't pay their electricity bills. According to sources, the consumers who were connected legally were grossly overbilled for the cost of numerous illegally connected consumers. This story was covered on Sparkonline.com.ng on the 27th of February, 2017.

== Ibusa Sports Club (ISC) ==
The Ibusa Sports Club is the body responsible for the organization of the Ibusa Annual Soccer event in the town and was founded in 1985 for this purpose. This football competition creates healthy rivalry among the town's ten Ogbes (Quarters) destined to battle for the competition. This tournament is highly standardized with the use of Nigerian Football Federation Graded Referees, Assistant Referees, Linesmen, match Commissioners and a team of three commentators.

The Ogbeowele team won the competition five times, 1985, 1989, 1991, 1992 and 1994. Umuekea five times, first in 1987, 1997, 1998, 2008 and 2010, and Anyalaobum four times, in 1988, 1990, 1993 and 1996. Umuodafe has lifted the silverware a total of five times, 1995, 2001, 2004, 2006 and 2009.

Ibusa has produced prominent footballers, many of whom have featured for Nigeria. Some of these players are Kingsley Obiekwe, the 1996 Atlanta Olympic Gold medalist in football; Elder Lawrence Okonji of Green Eagles now Super Eagles 1962 -1973; the late Peter Anieke of the Green Eagles; Emmanuel Olisadebe who naturalized and featured for Poland in 2002 and 2006 editions of the FIFA World Cup tournaments.
