= Pandemis orophila =

Scientific classification
- Domain: Eukaryota
- Kingdom: Animalia
- Phylum: Arthropoda
- Class: Insecta
- Order: Lepidoptera
- Family: Tortricidae
- Genus: Pandemis
- Species: P. orophila

Binomial name
- Pandemis orophila (Bradley, 1965)

Synonyms
- Parapandemis orophila Bradley, 1965

Species of moth

Pandemis orophila is a species of moth of the family Tortricidae. It is found in Uganda.
