= Pandemis tarda =

Scientific classification
- Domain: Eukaryota
- Kingdom: Animalia
- Phylum: Arthropoda
- Class: Insecta
- Order: Lepidoptera
- Family: Tortricidae
- Genus: Pandemis
- Species: P. tarda

Binomial name
- Pandemis tarda (Diakonoff, 1963)

Synonyms
- Parapandemis tarda Diakonoff, 1963

Species of moth

Pandemis tarda is a species of moth of the family Tortricidae. It is found in Madagascar.
