= Pandemis dispersa =

Scientific classification
- Kingdom: Animalia
- Phylum: Arthropoda
- Class: Insecta
- Order: Lepidoptera
- Family: Tortricidae
- Genus: Pandemis
- Species: P. dispersa

Binomial name
- Pandemis dispersa (Diakonoff, 1960)

Synonyms
- Parapandemis dispersa Diakonoff, 1960

Species of moth

Pandemis dispersa is a species of moth of the family Tortricidae. It is found on Madagascar.
