= Pandemis cerioschema =

Scientific classification
- Kingdom: Animalia
- Phylum: Arthropoda
- Class: Insecta
- Order: Lepidoptera
- Family: Tortricidae
- Genus: Pandemis
- Species: P. cerioschema

Binomial name
- Pandemis cerioschema (Meyrick, 1934)

Synonyms
- Homona cerioschema Meyrick, 1934

Species of moth

Pandemis cerioschema is a species of moth of the family Tortricidae. It is found in the Democratic Republic of Congo and Uganda.
