= Pandemis niphostigma =

Scientific classification
- Domain: Eukaryota
- Kingdom: Animalia
- Phylum: Arthropoda
- Class: Insecta
- Order: Lepidoptera
- Family: Tortricidae
- Genus: Pandemis
- Species: P. niphostigma

Binomial name
- Pandemis niphostigma (Diakonoff, 1960)

Synonyms
- Parapandemis niphostigma Diakonoff, 1960

Species of moth

Pandemis niphostigma is a species of moth of the family Tortricidae. It is found in Madagascar.
