= Pandemis dryoxesta =

Scientific classification
- Kingdom: Animalia
- Phylum: Arthropoda
- Class: Insecta
- Order: Lepidoptera
- Family: Tortricidae
- Genus: Pandemis
- Species: P. dryoxesta

Binomial name
- Pandemis dryoxesta Meyrick, 1920

Species of moth

Pandemis dryoxesta is a species of moth of the family Tortricidae. It is found in what was the Punjab region of British India.
