= Pandemis inouei =

Scientific classification
- Kingdom: Animalia
- Phylum: Arthropoda
- Class: Insecta
- Order: Lepidoptera
- Family: Tortricidae
- Genus: Pandemis
- Species: P. inouei

Binomial name
- Pandemis inouei Kawabe, 1968

Species of moth

Pandemis inouei is a moth of the family Tortricidae. It is found on Taiwan.
