= H. D. F. Kitto =

British classical scholar (1897–1982)

Humphrey Davy Findley Kitto FBA (6 February 1897 – 21 January 1982) was an English classical scholar. He was born in Stroud, Gloucestershire.

He was educated at The Crypt School, Gloucester, and St. John's College, Cambridge. He wrote his doctorate in 1920 at the University of Bristol. He became a lecturer in Greek at the University of Glasgow from 1920 to 1944. In that year, he returned to the University of Bristol where he became Professor of Greek and emeritus in 1962. He concentrated on studies of Greek tragedy, especially translations of the works of Sophocles.

His early book, "In the Mountains of Greece", describes his journeys in that country, with no more than incidental reference to antiquity.

His 1952 general treatment The Greeks covered the whole range of ancient Greek culture, and became a standard text.

In 1962, William Beare nominated H. D. F. Kitto for the Nobel Prize in Literature.

After his retirement, Kitto taught at College Year in Athens (CYA), a study abroad program for foreign students in Athens, Greece. He also taught at the University of California, Santa Barbara in the 1960s.

== Works ==
- In the Mountains of Greece (1933)
- Greek Tragedy: A Literary Study (1939)
- Form and meaning in drama: A study of six Greek plays and of Hamlet (1956)
- The Greeks (1951; 1952), Penguin Books A220
- Poiesis: Structure and Thought (1966), Sather Classical Lectures
- Sophocles: Three Tragedies: Antigone, Oedipus the King, Electra. translated into English verse by H. D. F. Kitto
