= Pandemis thomasi =

Scientific classification
- Domain: Eukaryota
- Kingdom: Animalia
- Phylum: Arthropoda
- Class: Insecta
- Order: Lepidoptera
- Family: Tortricidae
- Genus: Pandemis
- Species: P. thomasi

Binomial name
- Pandemis thomasi Razowski, 2006

Species of moth

Pandemis thomasi is a species of moth of the family Tortricidae. It is endemic to India (Jammu and Kashmir).

The wingspan is about 24 millimetres (0.94 in).
