= Pandemis oculosa =

Scientific classification
- Domain: Eukaryota
- Kingdom: Animalia
- Phylum: Arthropoda
- Class: Insecta
- Order: Lepidoptera
- Family: Tortricidae
- Genus: Pandemis
- Species: P. oculosa

Binomial name
- Pandemis oculosa (Diakonoff, 1960)

Synonyms
- Parapandemis oculosa Diakonoff, 1960

Species of moth

Pandemis oculosa is a species of moth of the family Tortricidae. It is found in Madagascar.
