= Pandemis curvipenita =

Scientific classification
- Domain: Eukaryota
- Kingdom: Animalia
- Phylum: Arthropoda
- Class: Insecta
- Order: Lepidoptera
- Family: Tortricidae
- Genus: Pandemis
- Species: P. curvipenita

Binomial name
- Pandemis curvipenita Liu & Bai, 1982

Species of moth

Pandemis curvipenita is a species of moth of the family Tortricidae. It is found in Jilin, China.
