= Pandemis perispersa =

Scientific classification
- Domain: Eukaryota
- Kingdom: Animalia
- Phylum: Arthropoda
- Class: Insecta
- Order: Lepidoptera
- Family: Tortricidae
- Genus: Pandemis
- Species: P. perispersa

Binomial name
- Pandemis perispersa (Diakonoff, 1970)

Synonyms
- Parapandemis perispersa Diakonoff, 1970

Species of moth

Pandemis perispersa is a moth of the family Tortricidae. It is found in north Madagascar.

The female has a wingspan of 30 mm. The head is light ochreous with a long palpus of about five times the eye diameter. The thorax is pale ochreous suffused with light purplish fulvous. The abdomen is pale ochreous with purple points. The forewings are oblong truncate, costa moderately sinuate (wavy). They are light fulvous (tawny) evenly suffused with light grey, with a purple tinge and in certain lights with a golden gloss. The costal edge is narrowly white.

The hindwings are whitish yellow with the apical third suffused with light fulvous and transversed with purplish grey.
