= Pandemis phaiopteron =

Scientific classification
- Kingdom: Animalia
- Phylum: Arthropoda
- Class: Insecta
- Order: Lepidoptera
- Family: Tortricidae
- Genus: Pandemis
- Species: P. phaiopteron

Binomial name
- Pandemis phaiopteron Razowski, 1978

Species of moth

Pandemis phaiopteron is a species of moth of the family Tortricidae. It is found in China (Shensi).
