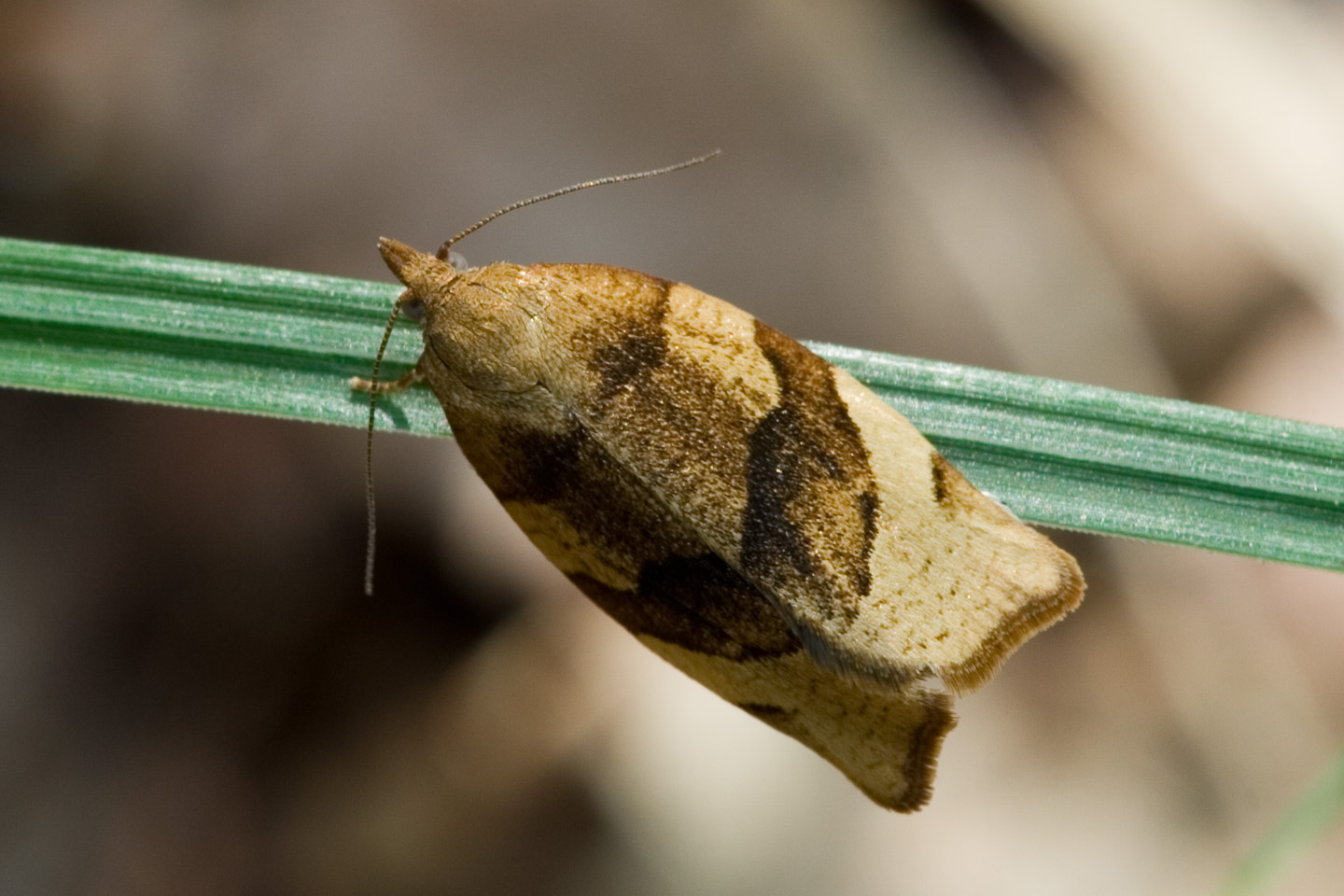
- Pandemis cerasana

Scientific classification
- Kingdom: Animalia
- Phylum: Arthropoda
- Clade: Pancrustacea
- Class: Insecta
- Order: Lepidoptera
- Family: Tortricidae
- Tribe: Archipini
- Genus: Pandemis; Hubner, [1825]

Synonyms
- Pamdemia Stephens, 1834; Pandennis Moffat, 1866; Parapandemis Obraztsov, 1954

= Pandemis =

Genus of tortrix moths

Pandemis is a genus of moths of the family Tortricidae and the tribe Archipini.

== Species ==
- Pandemis acumipenita Liu & Bai, 1983
- Pandemis canadana Kearfott, 1905
- Pandemis capnobathra (Meyrick, 1930)
- Pandemis caryocentra Diakonoff, 1960
- Pandemis cataxesta Meyrick, 1937
- Pandemis cerasana (Hübner, 1786)
- Pandemis cerioschema (Meyrick, 1934)
- Pandemis chlorograpta Meyrick, 1921
- Pandemis chondrillana (Herrich-Schäffer, 1860)
- Pandemis cinnamomeana (Treitschke, 1830)
- Pandemis corylana (Fabricius, 1794)
- Pandemis croceocephala (Diakonoff, 1960)
- Pandemis croceotacta (Diakonoff, 1960)
- Pandemis crocograpta (Meyrick, 1933)
- Pandemis curvipenita Liu & Bai, 1982
- Pandemis dispersa (Diakonoff, 1960)
- Pandemis dryoxesta Meyrick, 1920
- Pandemis dumetana (Treitschke, 1835)
- Pandemis electrochroa (Diakonoff, 1977)
- Pandemis emptycta Meyrick, 1937
- Pandemis euryloncha (Diakonoff, 1973)
- Pandemis eustropha (Bradley, 1965)
- Pandemis fulvastra Bai, 1994
- Pandemis griveaudi (Diakonoff, 1960)
- Pandemis heparana ([Denis & Schiffermuller], 1775)
- Pandemis ianus (Diakonoff, 1970)
- Pandemis ignescana (Kuznetsov, 1976)
- Pandemis inouei Kawabe, 1968
- Pandemis isotetras (Meyrick, 1934)
- Pandemis lamprosana (Robinson, 1869)
- Pandemis lichenosema (Diakonoff, 1970)
- Pandemis limitata (Robinson, 1869)
- Pandemis marginumbra (Diakonoff, 1960)
- Pandemis metallochroma (Diakonoff, 1948)
- Pandemis minuta (Diakonoff, 1960)
- Pandemis monticolana Yasuda, 1975
- Pandemis niphostigma (Diakonoff, 1960)
- Pandemis oculosa (Diakonoff, 1960)
- Pandemis orophila (Bradley, 1965)
- Pandemis pauliani (Diakonoff, 1960)
- Pandemis perispersa (Diakonoff, 1970)
- Pandemis phaedroma Razowski, 1978
- Pandemis phaenotherion Razowski, 1978
- Pandemis phaiopteron Razowski, 1978
- Pandemis piceocola Liu, 1990
- Pandemis plutosema (Diakonoff, 1960)
- Pandemis pyrusana Kearfott, 1907
- Pandemis quadrata Liu & Bai, 1983
- Pandemis rectipenita Liu & Bai, 1982
- Pandemis refracta (Diakonoff, 1960)
- Pandemis regalis (Diakonoff, 1960)
- Pandemis retroflua (Diakonoff, 1960)
- Pandemis rotundata (Diakonoff, 1960)
- Pandemis sclerophylla (Diakonoff, 1960)
- Pandemis stalagmographa (Diakonoff, 1960)
- Pandemis stipulaceana (Mabille, 1900)
- Pandemis straminocula (Diakonoff, 1960)
- Pandemis striata Bai, 1994
- Pandemis subovata (Diakonoff, 1970)
- Pandemis tarda (Diakonoff, 1963)
- Pandemis thomasi Razowski, 2006
- Pandemis xanthacra (Diakonoff, 1960)
- Pandemis xylophyes (Diakonoff, 1960)

== See also ==
- List of Tortricidae genera
