= Greek dialects =

Greek dialects may refer to:

- Ancient Greek dialects
- Varieties of Modern Greek
