= CBN Ogbogbo =

Nigerian academic and lawyer (born 1963)

Professor Christopher Ogbogbo
- Born: 10 October 1963 (age 62); Lagos, Nigeria
- Citizenship: Nigeria
- Known for: Historian and Law in Africa

Christopher Bankole Ndubisi Ogbogbo (born 10 October 1963) is a Nigerian lawyer and professor of history. He is the former head of the Department of History, University of Ibadan, the Emeritus President of the Historical Society of Nigeria (2014 – 2018), President, Association of African Historians and the Substantive Vice Chancellor of Admiralty University of Nigeria.

== Early life and education ==
Ogbogbo was born in Lagos State, Nigeria, and was raised in both Lagos State and Port Harcourt, Rivers State, Nigeria. He studied history at the University of Ibadan and earned law degrees at the Obafemi Awolowo University, Ile-Ife. Ogbogbo has lectured on African History at Ibadan for the past 37 years. As a senior member of the Nigerian Bar Association, he has served as the Public Relations Officer and Treasurer of the NBA Ibadan branch in the early 1990s.

== Academic work ==
Ogbogbo has won several academic laurels and grants for his work, including the French Institute for Research in Africa IFRA Nairobi Grant 2005, the MacArthur Foundation Grant 2006, the University of Ibadan Senate Research Grant 2007, and the Humanities Staff Development Grant 2015. He was a visiting scholar at Northwestern University, Dartmouth College, St. Augustine University of Tanzania, Mwanza and the University of Benin in Nigeria. He was appointed a Visiting Professor of African History at the Kennesaw State University in Atlanta, Georgia in 2014. He has published 60+ works in academic journals and books. Currently, he is the Editor-in-Chief of the Journal of the Historical Society of Nigeria and the Editor of the Ibadan School of History Monograph Series. Ogbogbo has written on the Niger Delta and the challenges of nation-building in Nigeria. He also introduced Niger Delta studies to the University of Ibadan's History curriculum.

He is a consultant to organizations such as the Federal Ministry of Education and United Nations Development Programme (UNDP) and a member of several academic bodies, including Ethnic Studies Network, Ireland, American Studies Association, Member, African Studies Association, U.S.A., Historical Society of Nigeria, Nigerian Bar Association and the Society for Peace Studies and Practice.

Books written include The Dynamics of Inter-Group Relations in Nigeria Since 1960 (Essays in Honor of Obaro Ikime @ 70).
