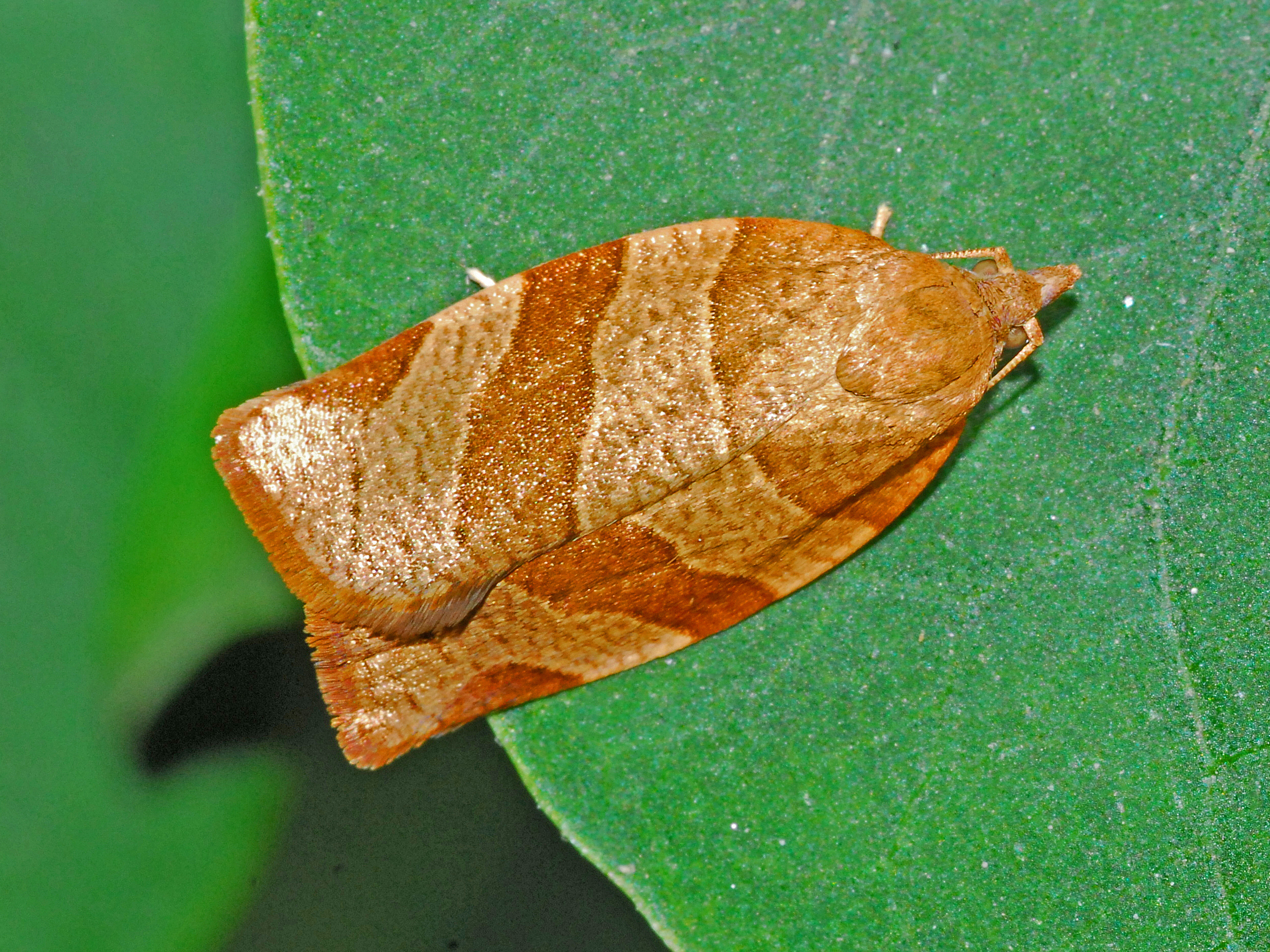
- Pandemis cerasana. Dorsal view
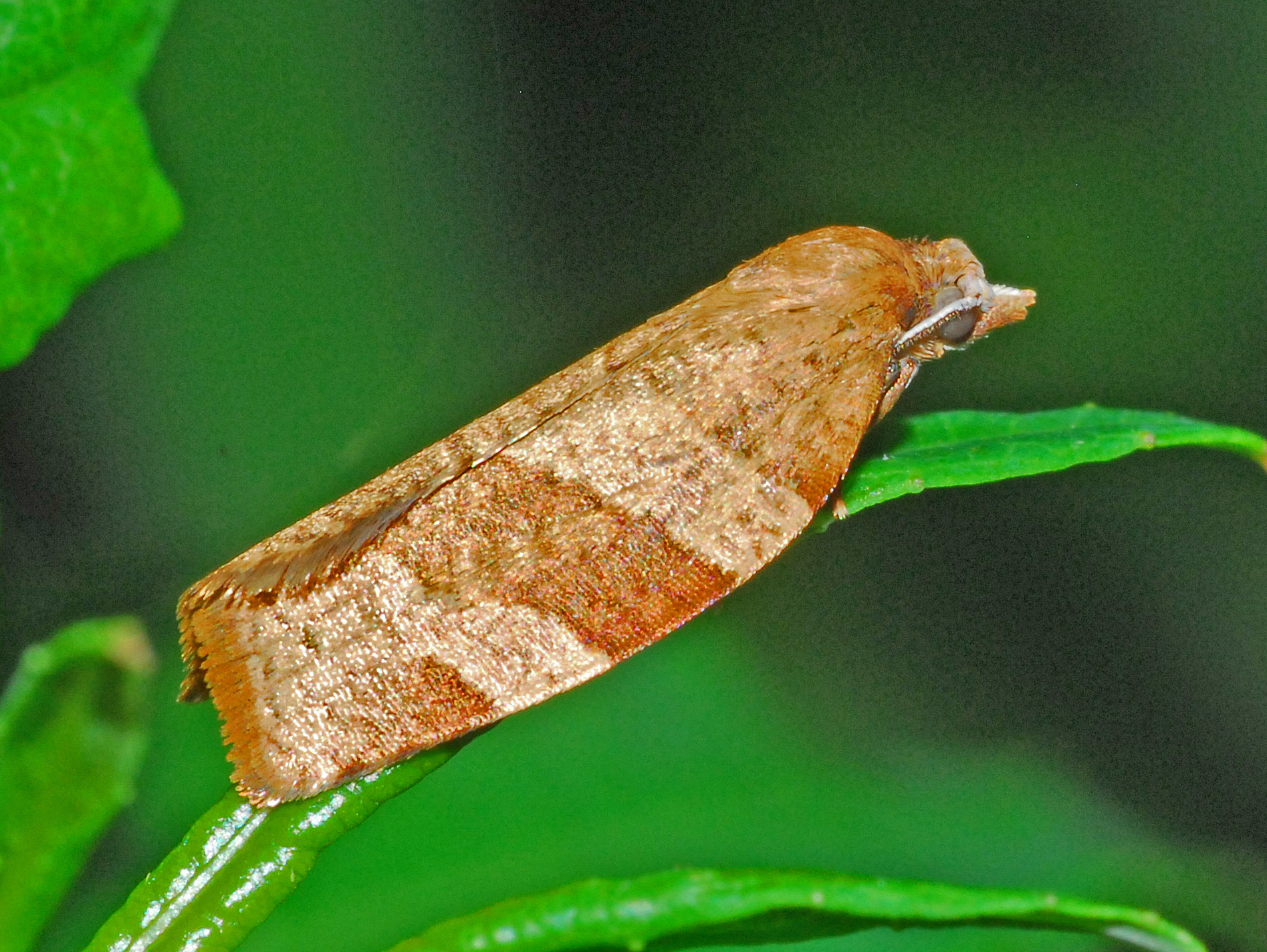
- Side view

Scientific classification
- Domain: Eukaryota
- Kingdom: Animalia
- Phylum: Arthropoda
- Class: Insecta
- Order: Lepidoptera
- Family: Tortricidae
- Genus: Pandemis
- Species: P. cerasana

Binomial name
- Pandemis cerasana (Hübner, 1786)

Synonyms
- List: Phalaena (Tortrix) cerasana Hübner, 1786; Pandemis cerasana ab. balticola Strand, 1917; Lozotaenia grossulariana Stephens, 1829; Tortrix ribeana var. grossulariana Stephens, 1835; Tortrix ribeana ab. obscura Schyen, 1882; Tortrix ribeana Hubner, [1796-1799]; Pandemis ribeana var. transiens Dufrane, 1957

= Pandemis cerasana =

Barred fruit-tree tortix moth

Pandemis cerasana, the barred fruit-tree tortrix, is a moth of the family Tortricidae.

== Distribution ==
This quite common species is found in Europe, from the Iberian Peninsula to the Ural Mountains and the Caucasus, east to southern Siberia, Kazakhstan, Mongolia, China and the Far East. It is also found in Asia Minor and Iran. It is an introduced species in North America.

== Habitat ==
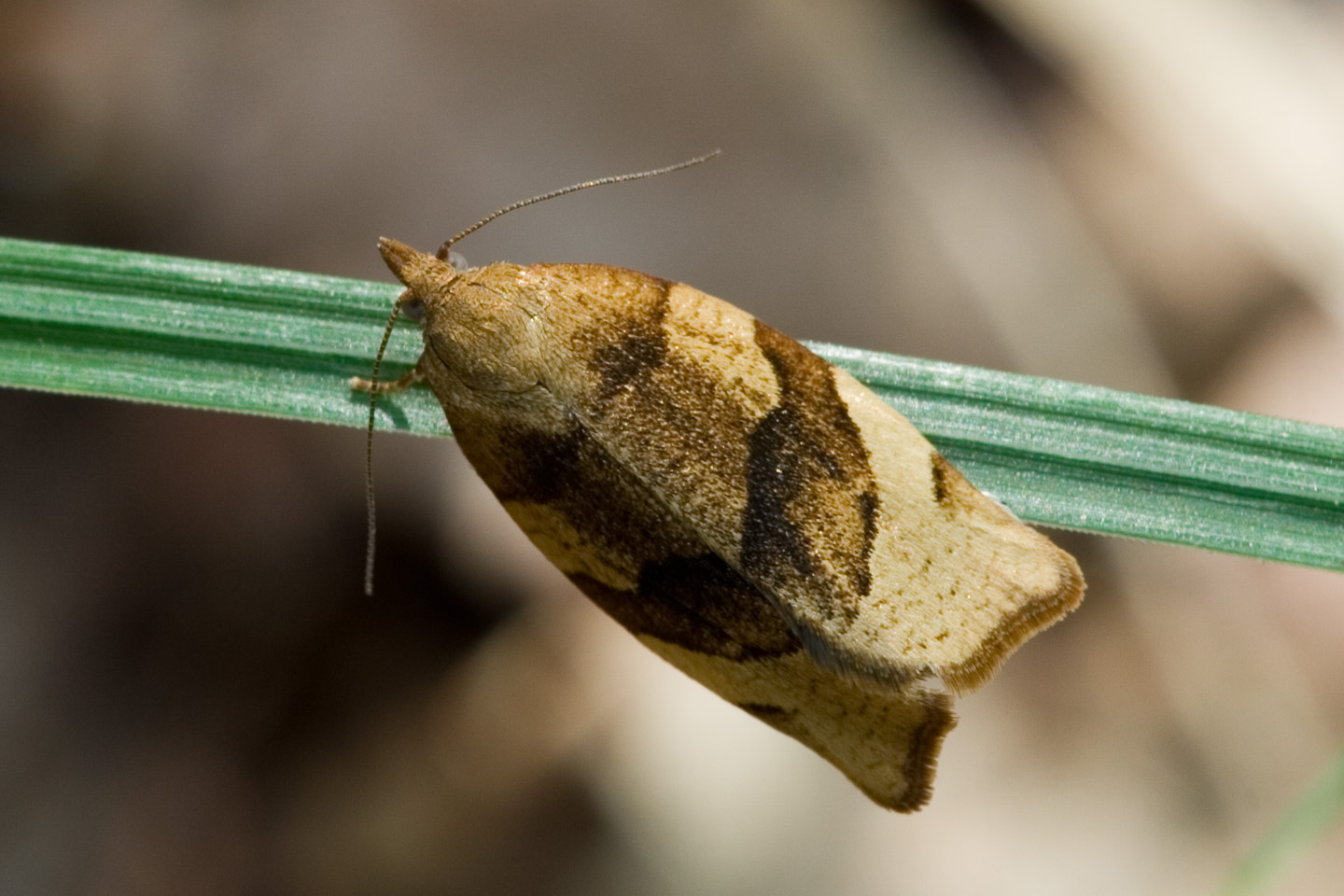
Pandemis cerasana

The barred fruit-tree tortrix live in woodland areas, gardens and orchards.

== Description ==
The wingspan of Pandemis cerasana can reach 16–25 mm. Forewings ground colour ranges from pale ocher yellow to greyish brown with a large dark chestnut brown V marking and a dark brown lateral spot. The outer margin of forewings is sinuous, slightly oblique.

The hind wings are almost uniform greyish brown. Antennae of the males have a notch near the base. Larvae can reach a length of about 20 millimetres (0.79 in). They are light green, thin and flattened.

Pupae are light brown to brownish black and reach a length of 9–15 millimetres (0.35–0.59 in). These tortrix moths usually rest holding their bell-shaped wings in a flattened posture.

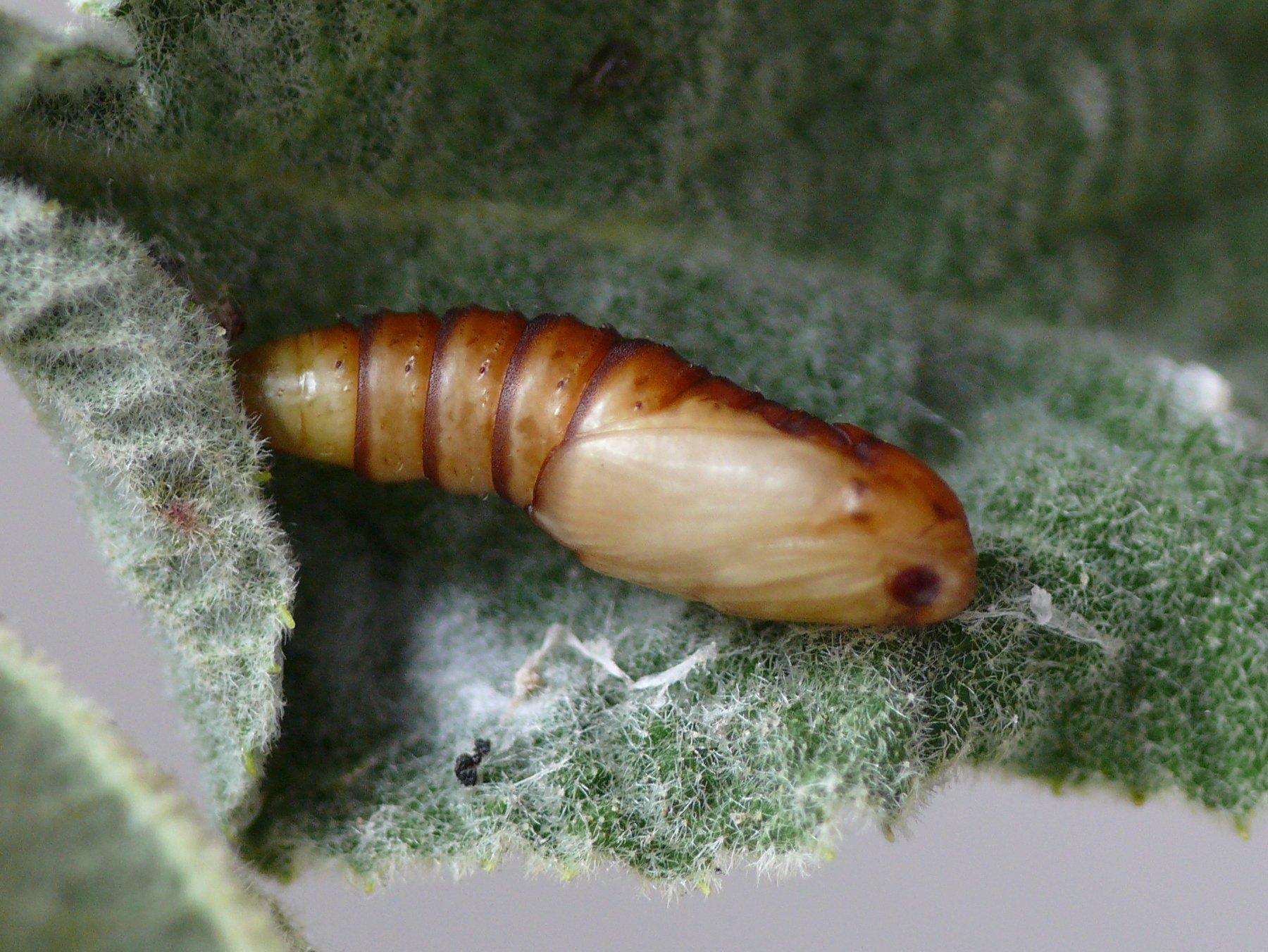
Pupa

== Biology ==
In western Europe these moths fly from June to August, mainly from dusk into the night. This species has two generations a year, the second generation larva being the winter form.

The larvae are polyphagous and feed on various deciduous trees and shrubs (Abies, Alnus, Acer, Betula, Crataegus, Fraxinus, Quercus) including fruit-trees (especially apple and pear, hazelnut (Corylus), currant (Ribes), blackberry and raspberry (Rubus) and cherry and plum (Prunus).
