= Hellenic =

Hellenic is a synonym for Greek. It means either:

- of or pertaining to the Hellenic Republic (modern Greece) or Hellenes (Greek: Έλληνες) and culture
- of or pertaining to ancient Greece, ancient Greek people, culture and civilization.
- Hellenic languages, a branch of the Indo-European language family whose principal member is:
  - Greek language

It may also refer to:

- Hellenic Academy, an independent high school in Harare, Zimbabwe
- Hellenic Airlines
- Hellenic College, a liberal arts college in Brookline, Massachusetts
- Hellenic College of London
- Hellenic Conservatory
- Hellenic FC, a football club in South Africa
- Hellenic Football League, an association football league in England
- Hellenic languages, a branch of the Indo-European languages
- Hellenic Parliament
- Hellenic Petroleum (company)
- Hellenic Post
- Hellenic Republic Asset Development Fund
- Hellenic studies
- Tampa Bay Hellenic, a women's soccer team in the United States
- Hellenic (horse) (1987–2011), a thoroughbred racehorse

== See also ==
- Greek (disambiguation)
- Helladic period, the Bronze Age in mainland Greece
- Hellas (disambiguation)
- Hellen, the eponymous ancestor of the Hellenes
- Hellene
- Hellenism (disambiguation)
- Hellenistic period, about 323 BC to 31 BC
- Hellenization
