= Grecian foxglove =

Grecian foxglove is a common name for several plants and may refer to:

- Digitalis laevigata
- Digitalis lanata
