= Pandemis stipulaceana =

Scientific classification
- Domain: Eukaryota
- Kingdom: Animalia
- Phylum: Arthropoda
- Class: Insecta
- Order: Lepidoptera
- Family: Tortricidae
- Genus: Pandemis
- Species: P. stipulaceana

Binomial name
- Pandemis stipulaceana (Mabille, 1900)

Synonyms
- Tortrix stipulaceana Mabille, 1900; Parapandemis stipulaceana hoplophora Diakonoff, 1960

Species of moth

Pandemis stipulaceana is a species of moth of the family Tortricidae. It is found in Madagascar.

== Subspecies ==
- Pandemis stipulaceana stipulaceana
- Pandemis stipulaceana hoplophora (Diakonoff, 1960)
