= The Greeks (book) =

1951 book by H. D. F. Kitto

- Cover of the 1951 edition
- Author: H. D. F. Kitto
- Language: English
- Subject: Classical Greece
- Publisher: Penguin Books
- Publication date: 1951
- Media type: Print
- Pages: 256 pages

The Greeks is a 1951 non-fiction book on classical Greece by University of Bristol professor and translator H. D. F. Kitto. The book was first published as a hardback copy by Penguin Books, but has been republished in several formats since its initial publication. The Greeks serves as an introduction to the whole range of life in ancient Greece and established Kitto as one of the foremost Grecian scholars of his time.

Kitto begins the book:

The reader is asked, for a moment, to accept this as a reasonable statement of fact, that in a part of the world that had for centuries been civilized, and quite highly civilized, there gradually emerged a people, not very numerous, not very powerful, not very well organized, who had a totally new conception of what human life was for, and showed for the first time what the human mind was for.

== Chapters ==
1. Introduction
2. The Formation of the Greek People
3. The Country
4. Homer
5. The Polis
6. Classical Greece: The Early Period
7. Classical Greece: The Fifth Century
8. The Greeks at War
9. The Decline of the Polis
10. The Greek Mind
11. Myth and Religion
12. Life and Character
13. Index

== Reception ==
The book's critical reception was positive, with the Sunday Times and Observer both praising The Greeks; several textbooks list it as a source or recommended read on the subject of ancient Greece. The Princeton Alumni Weekly praised Kitto for "not [glossing] over the failures and imperfections of the Greeks", and said the book would "delight the reader interested in things Greek with a fresh and vigorous approach to the classics".

The Greeks is mentioned in one of the best selling philosophy books of all times, Zen & The Art of Motorcycle Maintenance (1974) by Robert Pirsig (USA). In chapter 29 Pirsig uses The Greeks to expand on one of his key concepts, that of Quality. He finds it to be aligned to the Old Greek concept of Virtue and the Hindu concept of Dharma.
