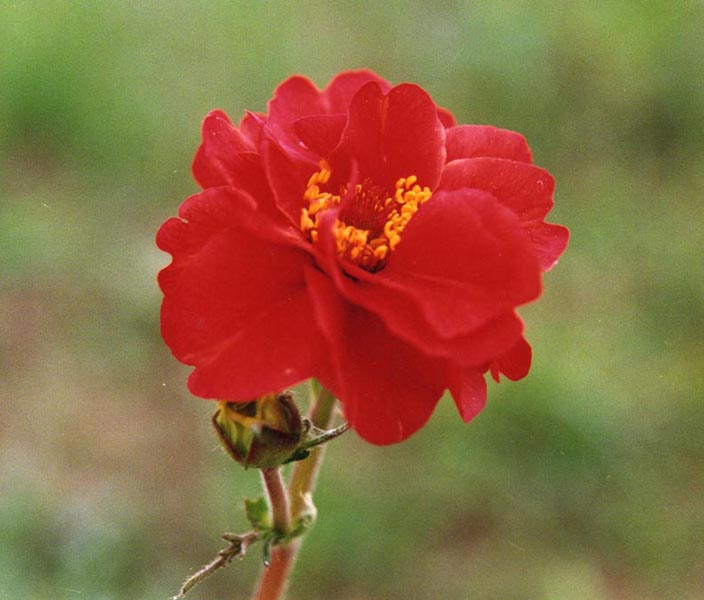
- Geum quellyon cultivar 'Mrs Bradshaw'

Scientific classification
- Kingdom: Plantae
- Clade: Tracheophytes
- Clade: Angiosperms
- Clade: Eudicots
- Clade: Rosids
- Order: Rosales
- Family: Rosaceae
- Genus: Geum
- Species: G. quellyon

Binomial name
- Geum quellyon Sweet

Synonyms
- Geum chiloense hort.; Geum chilense Balb. ex Lindl.; Geum chilense var. grandiflorum Lindl.; Geum coccineum Lindl. (Note: Not to be confused with Geum coccineum Sm., which is a different species of Geum.); Geum grandiflorum Lindl. ex. Steud. (Note: Not to be confused with Geum grandiflorum K.Koch, which is a synonym of Geum coccineum Sm..)

= Geum quellyon =

Species of flowering plant

Geum quellyon, commonly called scarlet avens, Chilean avens or Grecian rose, is a perennial herb in the family Rosaceae. It is native to the central and southern regions of Chile. G. quellyon has been introduced to other countries including Belgium, Bolivia, and the United Kingdom, where it was first planted in 1826.

== Description ==
=== Macroscale ===
Plants reach a height of between 6 and 100 centimeters (2.4 and 39.4 inches). Leaves are compound, with between 3 and 10 pairs of leaflets. G. quellyon grows a thick taproot which smells of cloves when broken due to the presence of aromatic compounds. Flowers vary in colour from yellow-orange to pink-red.

=== Microscale ===
When in metaphase, somatic chromosomes of G. quellyon (and of G. magellanicum, another species of Geum native to Chile) are shorter and fatter than those in other Geum species.

== Distribution ==
G. quellyon is native to the following regions of Chile: Araucanía, Aysén, Biobío, Los Lagos (including the island of Chiloé), Magallanes, Maule, Metropolitana de Santiago, Ñuble, O’Higgins, Los Ríos, and Valparaíso.

== Uses ==
=== Medicinal ===
G. quellyon has been used in the traditional medicine of the Mapuche people of Chile for tooth neuralgia, gastric inflammation, prostatitis, and to regulate menstruation. A methanolic extract is obtained from its roots.

Observations of a kidney transplant patient showed a pharmacological interaction between G. quellyon and cyclosporine, an immunosuppressant used to prevent transplant rejection.

=== Horticultural ===
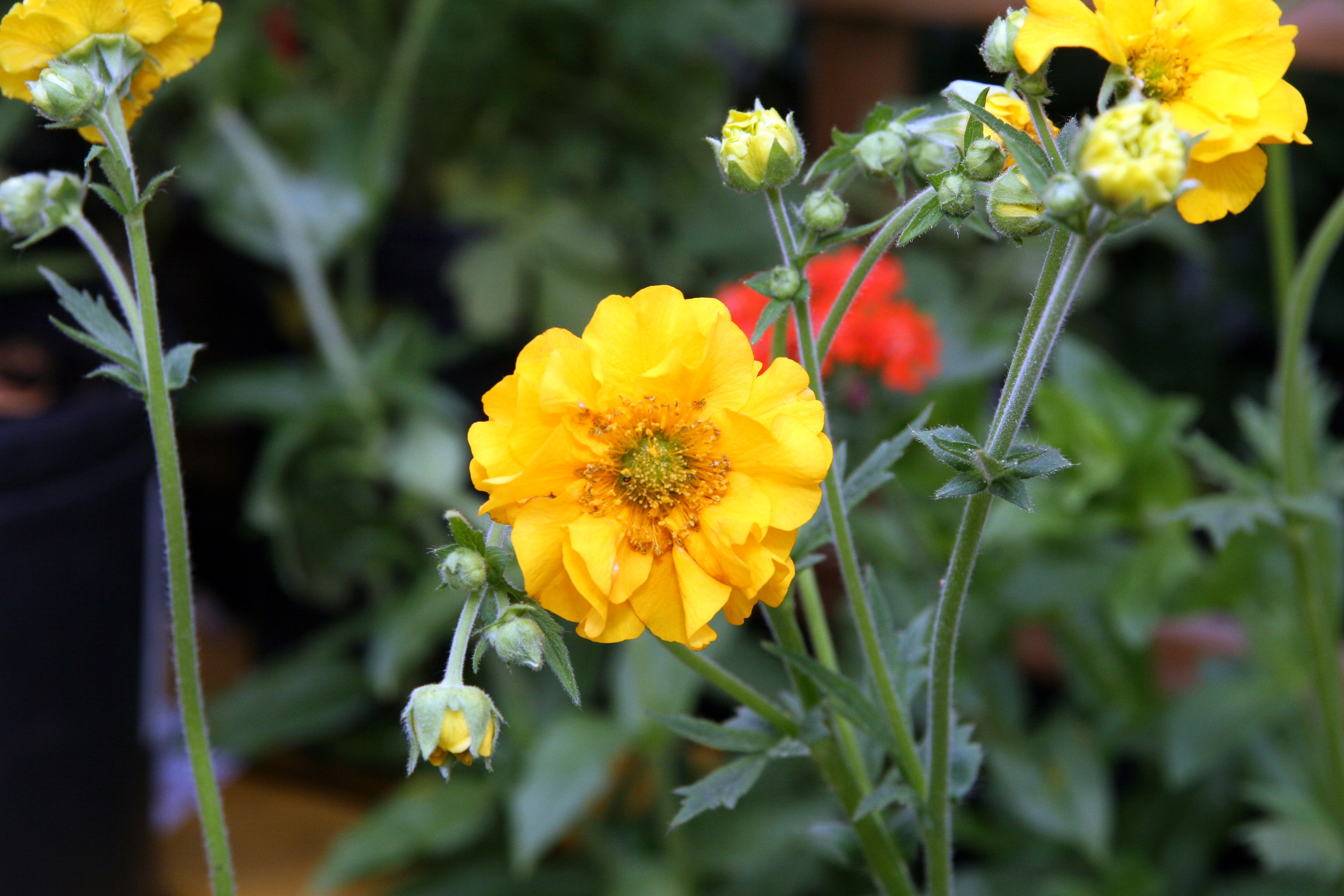
Geum quellyon 'Lady Stratheden'

Geum quellyon is commonly cultivated as a garden ornamental, and in that context is sometimes called Geum chiloense. G. quellyon grows best in full sun to part shade, in moist but well-drained soil. Plants become damaged and do not recover well if exposed to temperatures of −4.4 °C (24.1 °F) or below.

Cultivars include:

- Geum 'Blazing Sunset', which produces brick-red double flowers on tall stems from June to September. It grows to a height and spread of approximately 60 centimeters (24 inches).
- Geum 'Lady Stratheden', also known as Geum 'Gold Ball', which produces yellow semi-double flowers. The Royal Horticultural Society has awarded Geum 'Lady Stratheden' the Award of Garden Merit.
- Geum 'Mrs J Bradshaw', which produces large semi-double flowers from June to September. It grows to a height and spread of approximately 60 cm. It is often planted in cottage gardens. The Royal Horticultural Society has awarded Geum 'Mrs J Bradshaw' the Award of Garden Merit.
- Geum 'Totally Tangerine', which is a hybrid of G. quellyon 'Mrs J Bradshaw' and G. rivale. It grows to a height of 90 centimeters (35 inches), and produces sterile, peach-orange flowers. It is subject to plant breeders' rights in the European Union and the United Kingdom until 31 December 2036.
- Geum 'Double Bloody Mary'

== Diseases ==
G. quellyon may be affected by pathogens belonging to the genus Peronospora.
