= Pandemis capnobathra =

Scientific classification
- Kingdom: Animalia
- Phylum: Arthropoda
- Clade: Pancrustacea
- Class: Insecta
- Order: Lepidoptera
- Family: Tortricidae
- Genus: Pandemis
- Species: P. capnobathra

Binomial name
- Pandemis capnobathra (Meyrick, 1930)

Synonyms
- Homona capnobathra Meyrick, 1930; Parapandemis euphana Diakonoff, 1960

Species of moth

Pandemis capnobathra is a moth of the family Tortricidae. It is found in northern and eastern parts of Madagascar.

The female has a wingspan of 36–40 mm
