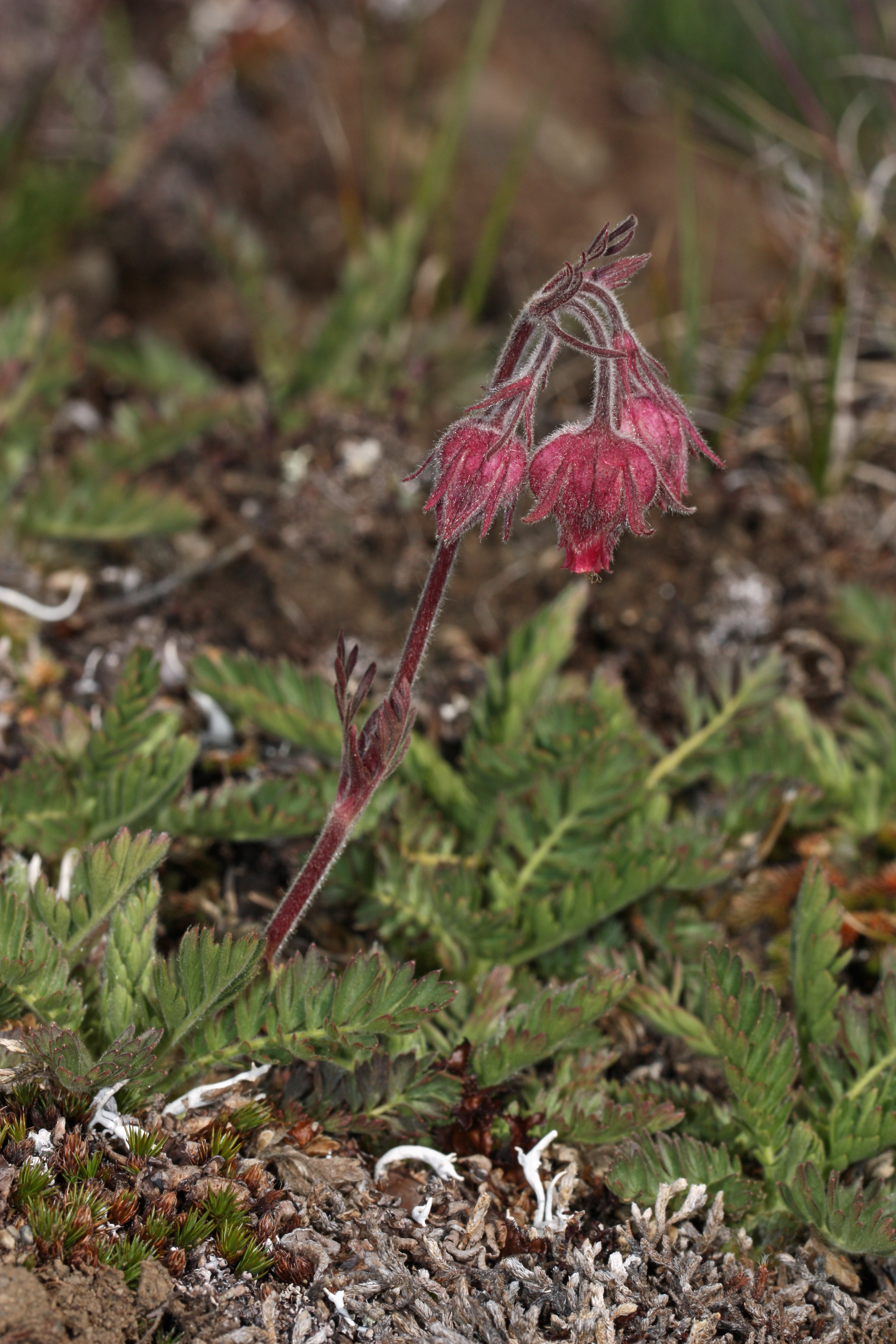
- Geum triflorum (Olympic National Park)

Conservation status
- Secure (NatureServe)

Scientific classification
- Kingdom: Plantae
- Clade: Tracheophytes
- Clade: Angiosperms
- Clade: Eudicots
- Clade: Rosids
- Order: Rosales
- Family: Rosaceae
- Genus: Geum
- Species: G. triflorum

Binomial name
- Geum triflorum Pursh

Varieties
- Geum triflorum var. ciliatum (Pursh) Fassett; Geum triflorum var. triflorum

Synonyms
- List: Erythrocoma campanulata Greene; Erythrocoma canescens Greene; Erythrocoma flavula Greene; Erythrocoma triflora (Pursh) Greene; Geum campanulatum (Greene) G.N.Jones; Geum canescens (Greene) Munz; Geum ciliatum var. triflorum (Pursh) Jeps.; Geum grahamii Steud.; Geum pubescens Hook.; Geum triflorum f. flavulum (Greene) Fassett; Geum triflorum f. pallidum Fassett; Geum triflorum var. campanulatum (Greene) C.L.Hitchc.; Geum triflorum var. canescens (Greene) Kartesz & Gandhi; Sieversia campanulata (Greene) Rydb.; Sieversia canescens (Greene) Rydb.; Sieversia triflora (Pursh) R.Br.; Sieversia flavula (Greene) Rydb.; Sieversia rosea Graham

= Geum triflorum =

Species of flowering plant

Geum triflorum, commonly known as prairie smoke, old man's whiskers, or three-flowered avens, is a spring-blooming perennial herbaceous plant of the Rosaceae family. It is a hemiboreal continental climate species that is widespread in colder and drier environments of western North America, although it does occur in isolated populations as far east as New York and Ontario. It is particularly known for the long feathery plumes on the seed heads that have inspired many of the regional common names and aid in wind dispersal of its seeds.

== Description ==
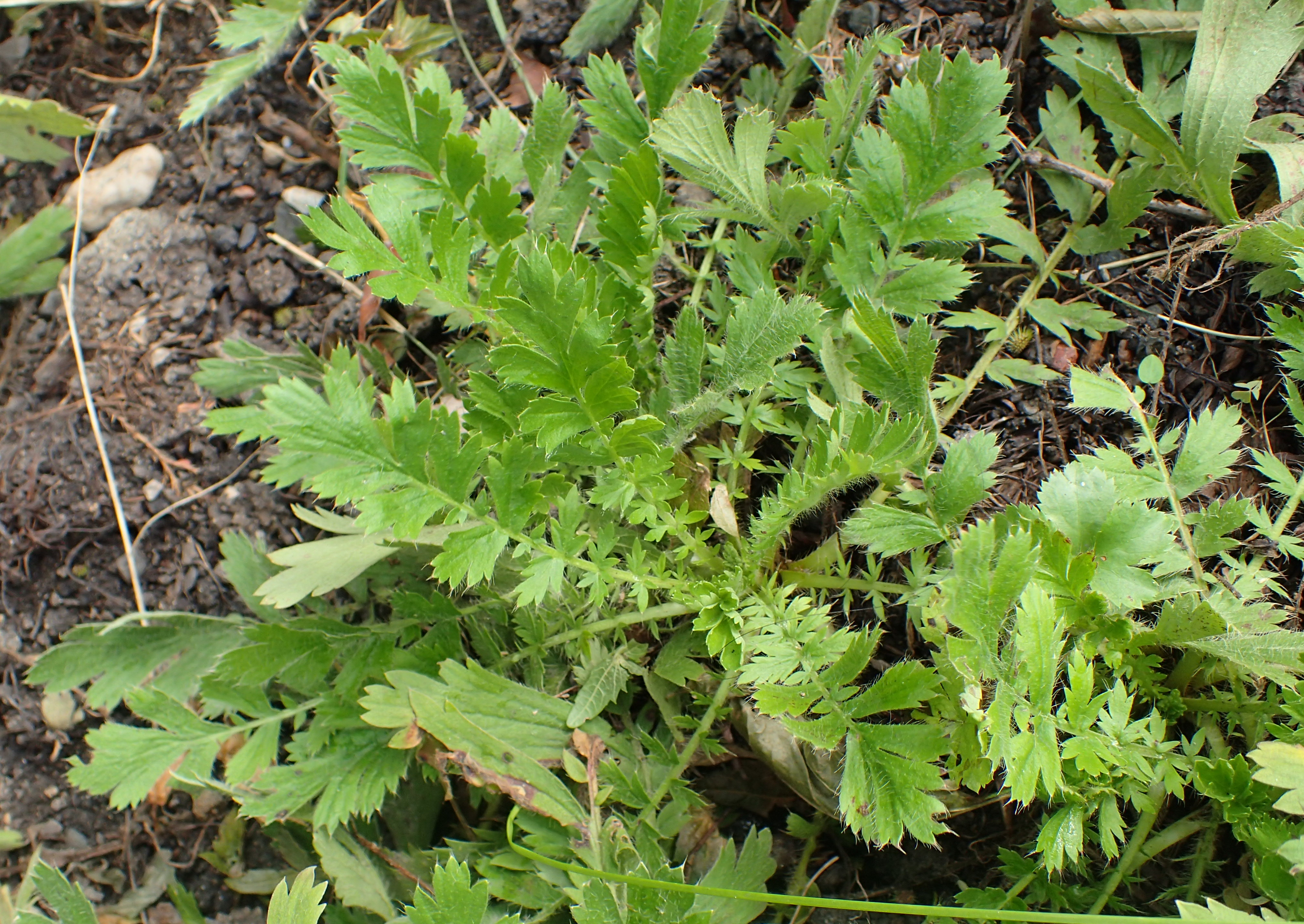
Leaves of G. triflorum showing distinct rosette

Geum triflorum is a perennial herb with short, spreading rhizomes, which form colonies of stemless rosettes. The roots are fiberous and have a sassafras-like flavor. The leaves grow from a caudex and are 4–30 cm (1.6–12 in) long. They are divided into leaflets with deep divisions that makes the leaves resemble the leaves of a fern. The leaflets are arranged pinnately along a common leaf stem with smaller leaflets mixed in with 7–18 larger ones and single larger leaflet at the end of the leaf. The leaves are covered with extremely small downy hairs.

Early in the spring, the leaves often lie flat to the ground and are in poor condition, but they soon become more upright in response to the warmer days and lack of snow cover. In the heat of a dry summer, the leaves also will lie down closer to the earth. The plants resume growth in the fall as other plants are starting to go dormant, developing a mound of deep grey-green leaves. The leaves are evergreen in areas without severe cold or there is protective snow cover, though they often turn purple, orange, or reddish.

The flowers of G. triflorum appear from mid-spring to early summer. The flowering stalks stand well above the leaves on red-purple-maroon stems 10–45 cm (3.9–18 in) in height. The flowering stem is almost bare with a few very small leaves called bractlets on the main stem and where the arching flower stalks (pedicels) attach to the main stem. Each flower hangs upside down by itself from a separate pedicle. There are usually three flowers on each flower stalk, but sometimes one, five, or even seven per stalk. The sepals are strongly closed and pink to maroon in color, covered in fine downy hairs, with five narrow pointed bracts radiating outward toward the base of the flower. The flowers contain five 7–13 mm long elliptical petals mostly to entirely hidden under the sepals. They are most often a light yellow to cream, but sometimes have a blush of pink or purple; they have purple veins.

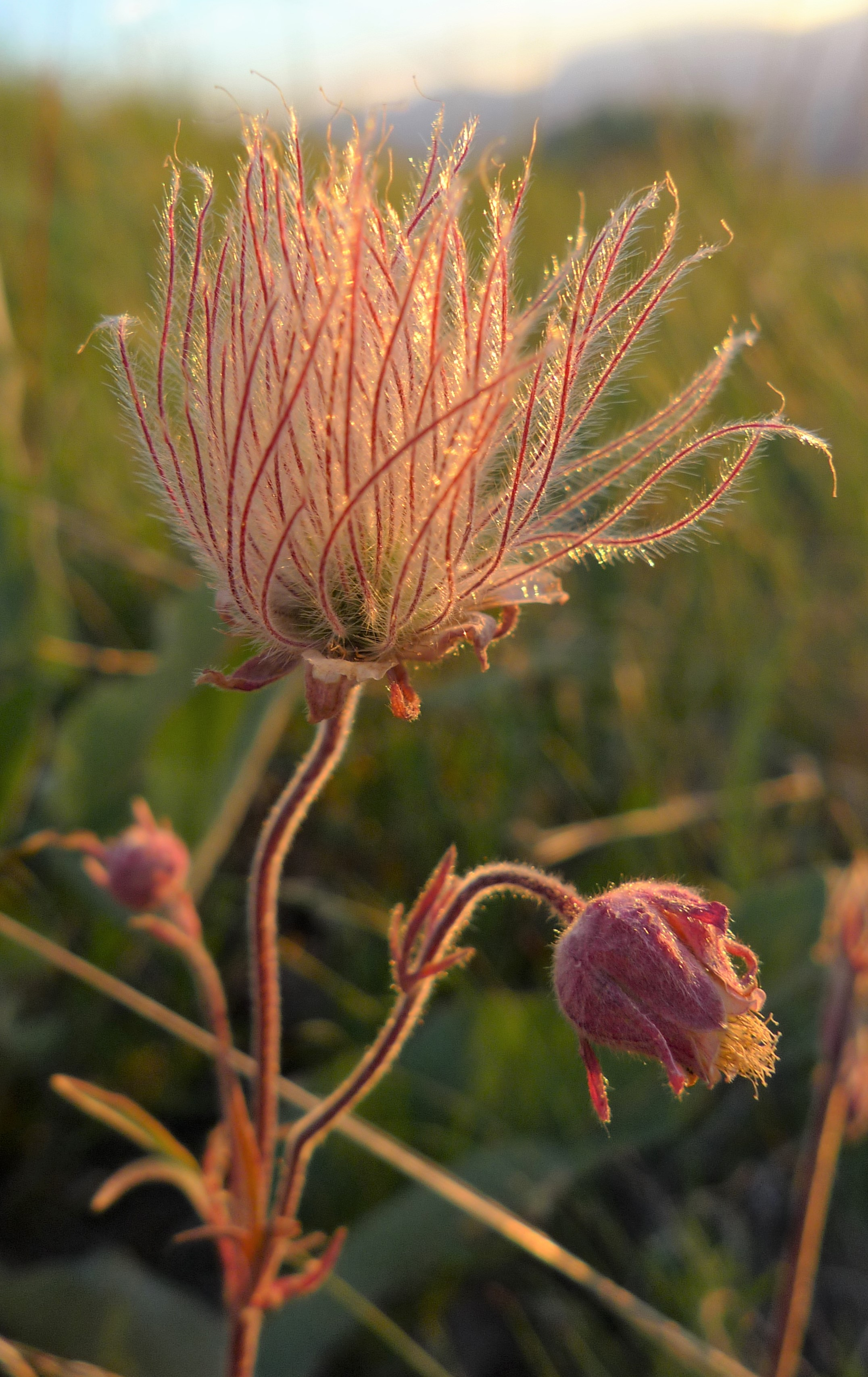
Seed head of G. triflorum var. ciliatum showing the elongated feathery styles

When pollination is completed, the flower heads turn upright and the sepals begin to open. The petals may be visible at this stage. The many styles grow longer, eventually becoming 15–70 mm in length. The styles are densely covered in fine hairs making them resemble downy bird feathers or wisps of mauve smoke. The seed heads start pale pink and fade to tan or grey as the seeds mature in mid-summer. The seeds do not appear to need cold stratification, as germination did not change significantly when tested.

== Taxonomy ==
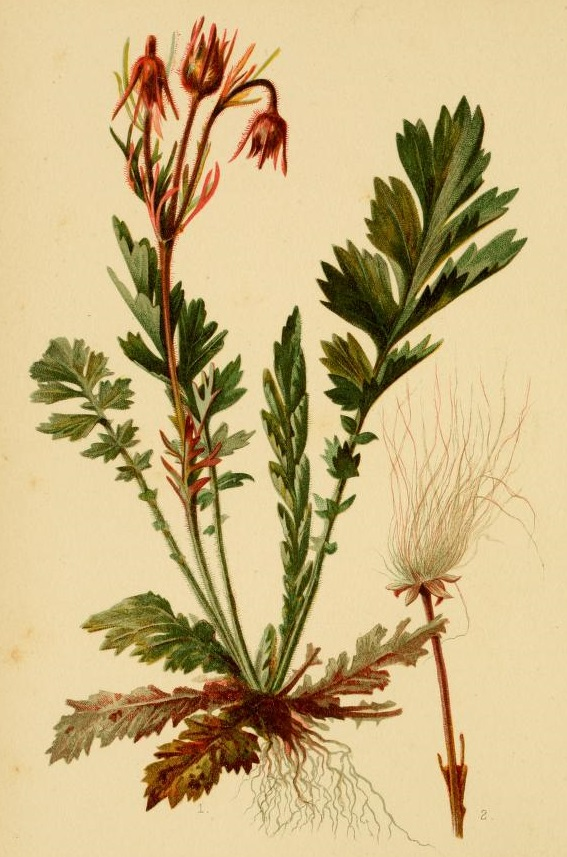
Illustration of G. triflorum from The Native Flowers and Ferns of the United States in their Botanical, Horticultural and Popular Aspects, 1878

Geum triflorum was named and described by German–American botanist Frederick Traugott Pursh in his book Flora americae septentrionalis using an 1811 collection by naturalist John Bradbury. He placed the species within Carl Linnaeus's Geum, a genus with a name derived from Greek for "taste", with the species name of Geum triflorum for the three flowers usually present on each flower stalk. The species previously had been collected in Idaho on 12 June 1806 by American explorer Meriwether Lewis but was not described by him. That specimen was incorrectly described as a new species named Geum ciliatum by Pursh. German botanist Kurt Sprengel placed it in Sieversia as S. triflora in his update of Systema Vegetabilium published in 1825. This classification was eventually rejected as was the 1906 attempt by American botanist Edward Lee Greene to create a new genus that would reclassify G. triflorum as Erythrocoma triflora and separate a dozen regional varieties as separate species.

=== Varieties and forms ===
G. triflorum has three varieties that are accepted by many, but not all, authorities, as of January 2023.

- Geum triflorum var. campanulatum (Greene) C.L.Hitchc.
- Geum triflorum var. canescens (Greene) Kartesz & Gandhi
- Geum triflorum var. ciliatum (Pursh) Fassett

==== Geum triflorum var. campanulatum ====
Geum triflorum var. campanulatum was described as a separate species, Erythrocoma campanulata, by Greene and as Geum campanulatum by English-born botanist George Neville Jones, but American botanist Charles Leo Hitchcock argued for its classification as a variety of G. triflorum in 1961, writing, "There has been much diversity of opinion regarding both the generic status of, and significance of the variation in, this complex. In general the several taxa that have been recognized at the specific level are largely sympatric and completely transitional and there seems to be no good reason to recognize more than 3 races for our area...". This has become the accepted view as researched by botanist Richard Pankhurst. It differs in having leaflets that are rounder (obovate-cuneiform instead of cuneiform), shorter leaves overall, and flowers that are more open or bell-shaped (campanulate). It was described from a type specimen found in the Olympic Mountains. It is recorded by the USDA Natural Resources Conservation Service PLANTS database (PLANTS) as growing in Washington state and Oregon. This variety is accepted by World Flora Online (WFO) and PLANTS, but not Plants of the World Online (POWO) or Flora of North America (FNA).

==== Geum triflorum var. canescens ====
Geum triflorum var. canescens was similarly described by Greene as Erythrocoma canescens in his 1906 book. Arguing against Erythrocoma, the Swedish-American botanist Per Axel Rydberg classified it as Sieversia canescens in 1913. In 1958, American botanist and plant taxonomist Philip A. Munz accepted it as a species but moved it back to Geum as Geum canescens. In 1990, John T. Kartesz and Kanchi Gandhi published an article on the nomenclature of North American plants giving it its current status as a variety of G. triflorum. The type specimen was collected in the northern Sierra Nevada Mountains in 1863 near Ebbett's Pass. It is distinguished by being stouter and sometimes taller than Geum triflorum var. campanulatum and covered in grayish-white hairs on the leaves "canescently soft-villous and sparsely pilose", but with similarly shorter leaves than the species. It is recorded by PLANTS as growing in the Pacific Northwest of the United States including California, Idaho, Montana, Nevada, Oregon, Washington state, and Wyoming with county level distribution records in northern California and Nevada. This variety is accepted by WFO and PLANTS, but not POWO or FNA.

==== Geum triflorum var. ciliatum ====
Geum triflorum var. ciliatum was first described as species Geum ciliatum by Pursh at the same time as he described G. triflorum. Scottish botanist and plant collector George Don reclassified it as Sieversia ciliata in 1832 in the book A General History of the Dichlamydeous Plants. It was similarly placed by Greene into his proposed Erythrocoma, but he separated it into two species, Erythrocoma ciliata and Erythrocoma grisea. In 1913, Rydberg described Sieversia grisea, but this is now accepted as a synonym for the variety. While there were other published classifications, the one currently accepted was written by Norman Carter Fassett and published in 1928 in the journal Rhodora. The variety is distinguished by having larger leaflets that are cleft (having a deep division) for more than half their lengths and the seed heads having shorter styles, 15–40 mm instead of 15–70 mm. The PLANTS database records it as growing from British Columbia to northern California and from the mountains of New Mexico to Saskatchewan. It is recorded by them as growing in both Colorado and Montana without county level distributions. This variety is accepted by WFO, PLANTS, POWO, and FNA.

Geum triflorum f. ornatum was published by Fassett at the same time as G. triflorum var. ciliatum in Rhodora. It is not accepted as a form of G. triflorum by most authorities, including WFO, PLANTS, POWO, and FNA.

=== Names ===
The species name triflorum is botanical Latin meaning three-flowered. Due to its wide distribution in North America it has a great many common names, many that are allusions to the appearance of its distinctive seeds with their feathery plumes. In English it is often known as prairie smoke for the resemblance of the seed heads to wisps of smoke. Similarly, the common name old man's whiskers is likely to be for the appearance of the seed plumes being like gray, fuzzy hairs. Less commonly it is also known as torchflower, long-plumed purple avens, grandfather's beard, or lion's beard. In Illinois it is also occasionally called Johnny-smokers. The origin of the common name avens is unknown, but is applied to species both in and out of the Geum genus. It is called both three-flowered avens and purple avens, however Geum rivale is also frequently called purple avens. For its three flowers it is also occasionally named three-sisters.

== Distribution ==
G. triflorum is widely distributed in North America, but only common in the Upper Midwest and mountainous west. In Canada, it is common from British Columbia to Manitoba. It also grows in parts of the Yukon Territory and Northwest Territory. It is a common prairie species in Minnesota, Wisconsin, and North Dakota. Contiguous with this it is reported in nine of the north-eastern counties in Illinois and eight counties in north-eastern South Dakota. It is recorded in PLANTS as growing in Iowa without a specific location. It is common throughout the prairies of Montana and Wyoming and into the mountains of Idaho, Colorado, Utah, and Nevada. It is present in the adjoining Black Hills in South Dakota, the eastern portions of Washington state, Oregon, and the north east mountainous portion of California. Populations are also found in the mountains of northern New Mexico and Arizona.

In the eastern United States and Ontario populations are much rarer and isolated. It grows in six counties of the lower peninsula of Michigan and just Chippewa County in the upper peninsula. In New York state it is only recorded in PLANTS as growing in Jefferson County and Oswego County, which are adjacent to Lake Ontario.

The New York Flora Atlas only records vouchered specimens from Jefferson County, New York.

== Habitat ==
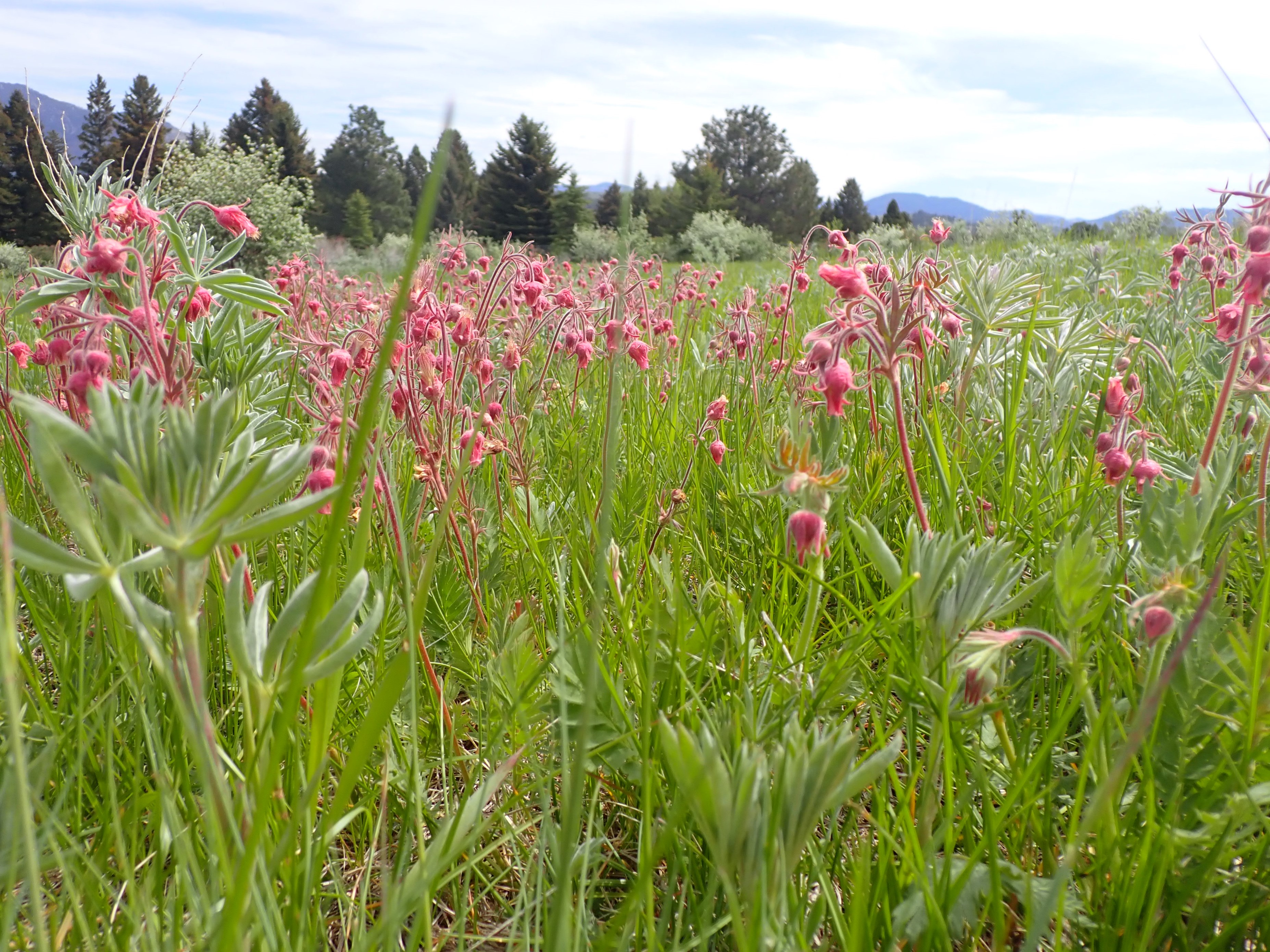
Typical western US habitat. Photo taken in Burke Park, Bozeman, Montana

G. triflorum grows in open, non-forested habitat with well drained soils. This includes meadows in montane forests, prairies of the upper Midwest, and alvars in Michigan, New York, Ontario, and Manitoba. Plants are tolerant of clay soils when slopes provide drainage, but intolerant of being waterlogged, particularly in winter. They require good moisture for new plants to establish and prefer areas that are well supplied with water in the spring, but tolerant of drought in summer and healthier with drier soils in summer. In habitats with more precipitation they will often be found in areas with more freely draining soils and/or on areas raised up above the surrounding landscape. In drier habitats plants will often be found in lower areas that have additional moisture from spring runoff. Prairie smoke plants are tolerant of some shade and prefer some afternoon shade in climates with hot summers.

In the central Rocky Mountains G. triflorum will grow to around timberline at 3,800 meters (12,500 ft) and as low as 2,000 meters (6,600 ft) in the foothills. In New York it grows at an altitude of 90 meters (300 ft). In the midwest it grows near to the level of the great lakes at 90 meters in elevation in Chaumont Barrens Preserve.

== Ecology ==
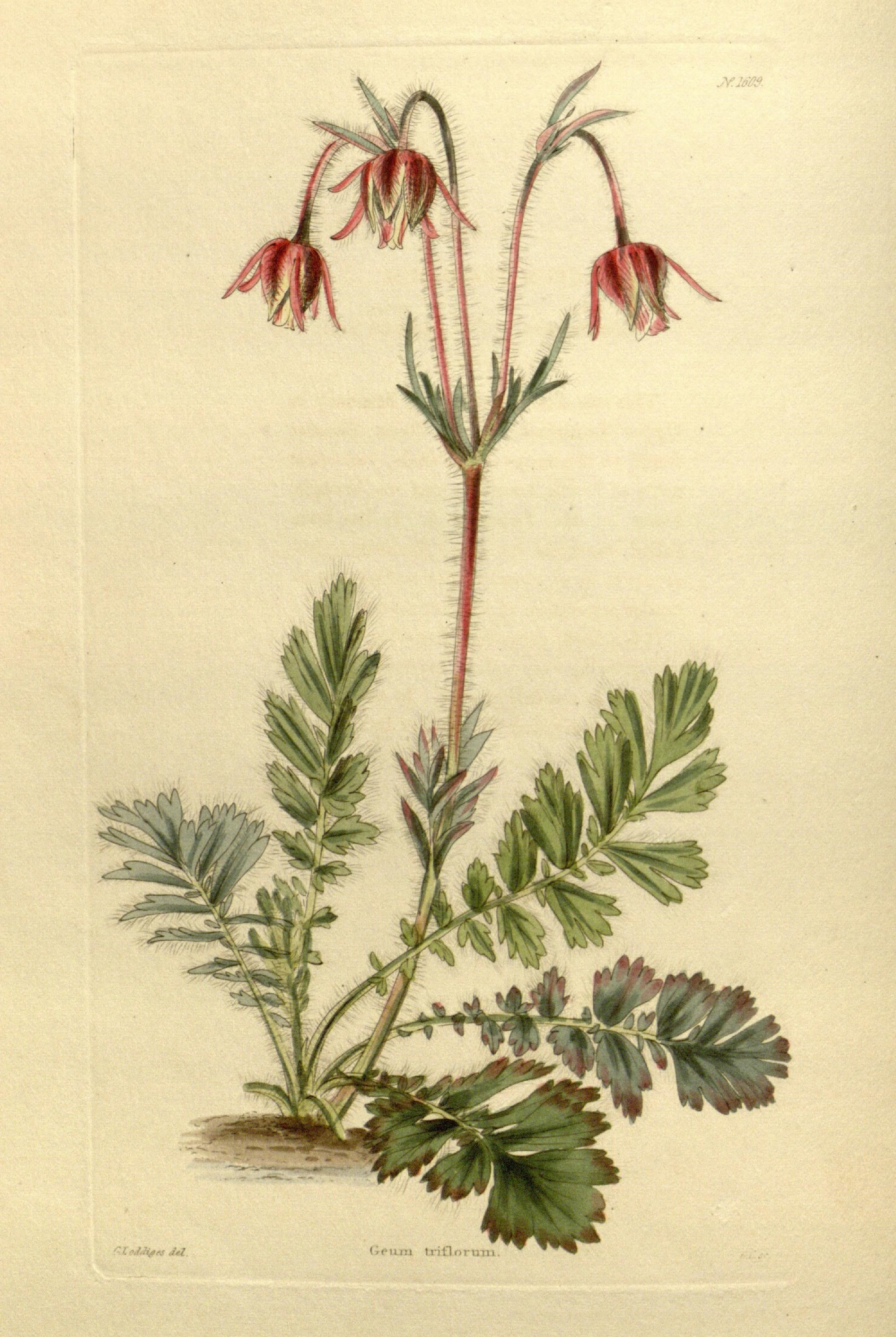
Illustration by George Cooke, 1830

The flowers produce both nectar and pollen. They are frequently visited by bumblebees, which are able to force their way into the mostly closed flowers and reach the nectar. They also buzz-pollinate to dislodge pollen from the stamens and gather it to feed their young. As it blooms early in the season and in large amounts in suitable habitats it is suggested that it is one of the plants that is critical to the success of queen bumblebees in establishing their first brood. Smaller bees such as sweat bees from the genus Lasioglossum feed on pollen grains from the opening of the flower. Bumblebees are the only effective cross-pollinators as G. trifloum are dependent on buzz pollination like plants such as tomatoes. Various insects become nectar robbers by chewing holes in the top of the flower, near the stem, to reach the nectar.

It is not a major source of forage for most native herbivores including mule deer, elk, pronghorn, and game birds, but is foraged by white tailed deer. It is similarly not generally eaten by cattle, horses, or domestic sheep and has a low amount of protein.

== Uses ==
Prairie smoke is planted in gardens as an ornamental for its interesting seed heads and for the persistent foliage in the winter. It is popular for native gardens, rock gardens, and with gardeners that wish to have an informal natural look. It is also suitable for use as part of green roof plantings because of its tolerance of periods of drought. Plants are winter hardy in USDA zones 3–7 and do not have any serious disease or pest problems. It is planted in either the spring or fall from cultivated plants or by seed. The size is dependent on the richness of the soil. Very lean soils without organic matter will grow compact plants, and in rich soils, the plants will become large and competitive. It is not tolerant of deep shade and can be displaced by taller species which grow over it and deprive it of light.

Some Indigenous peoples of the Northwest Plateau have used three-flowered avens to treat tuberculosis.

As recorded by Walter McClintock and later John C. Hellson, people of the Blackfeet Nation made an infusion of the roots to treat sore throats, canker sores in the mouth, and application to wounds and the infusion was also mixed with grease to create a salve used for the treatment of rashes, blisters, sores, and wounds. Infusions of the whole plant were used to treat severe coughs. The roots of G. triflorum were scraped and mixed with tobacco and then smoked by the Blackfeet to "clear the head". They also drank a tea made of the whole plant to promote general health.

== Gallery ==
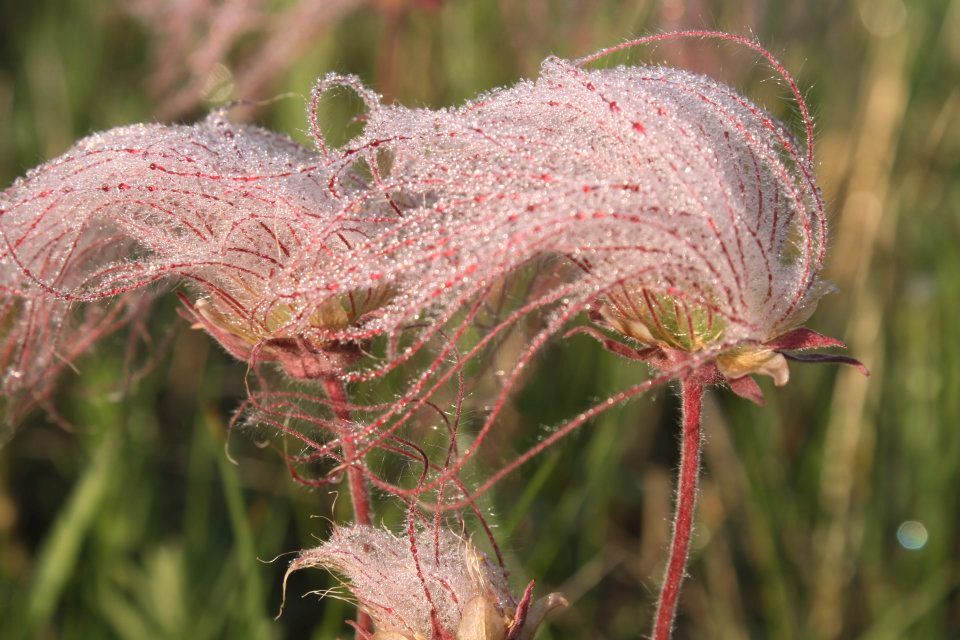
USFWS Mountain-Prairie

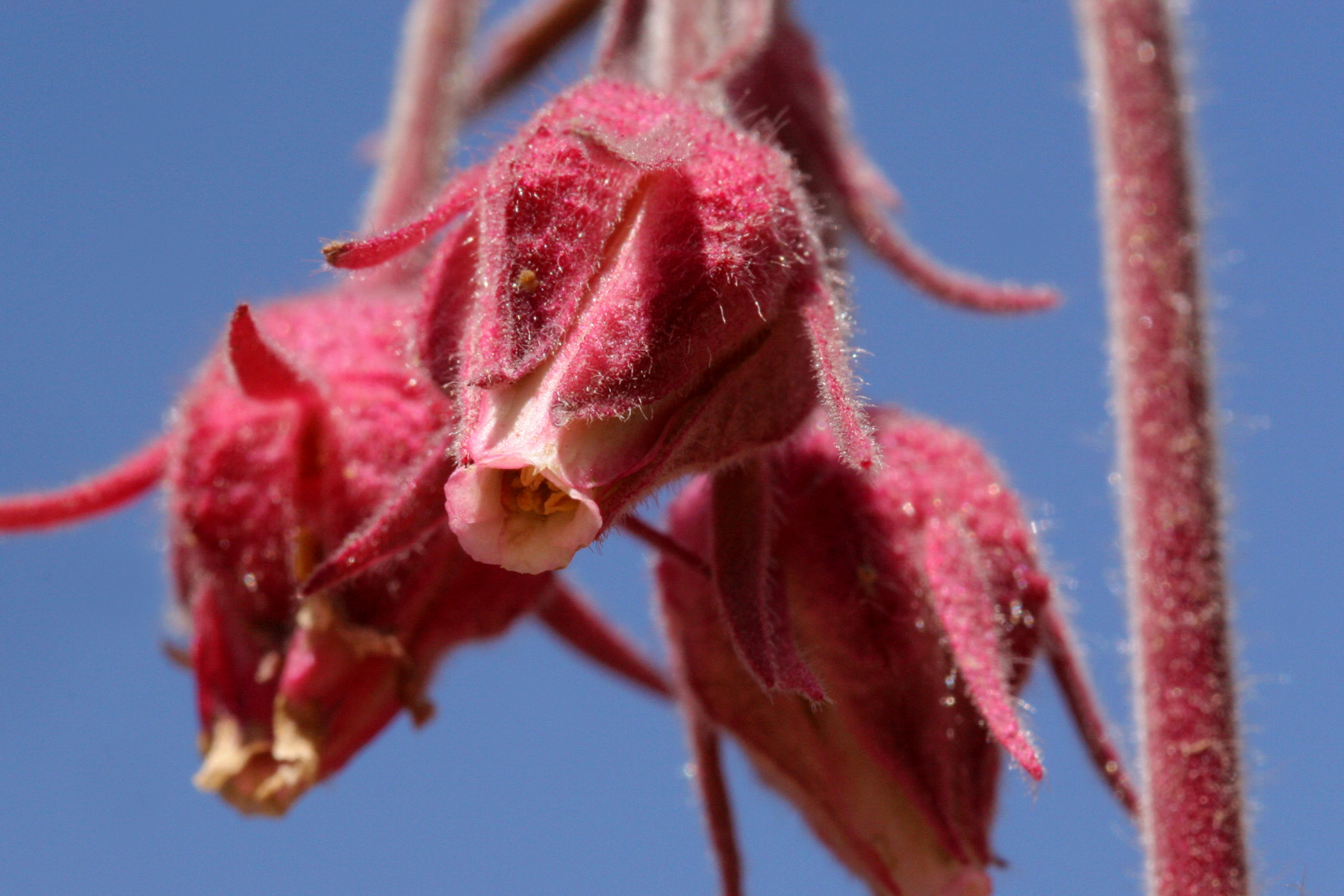
Flower detail

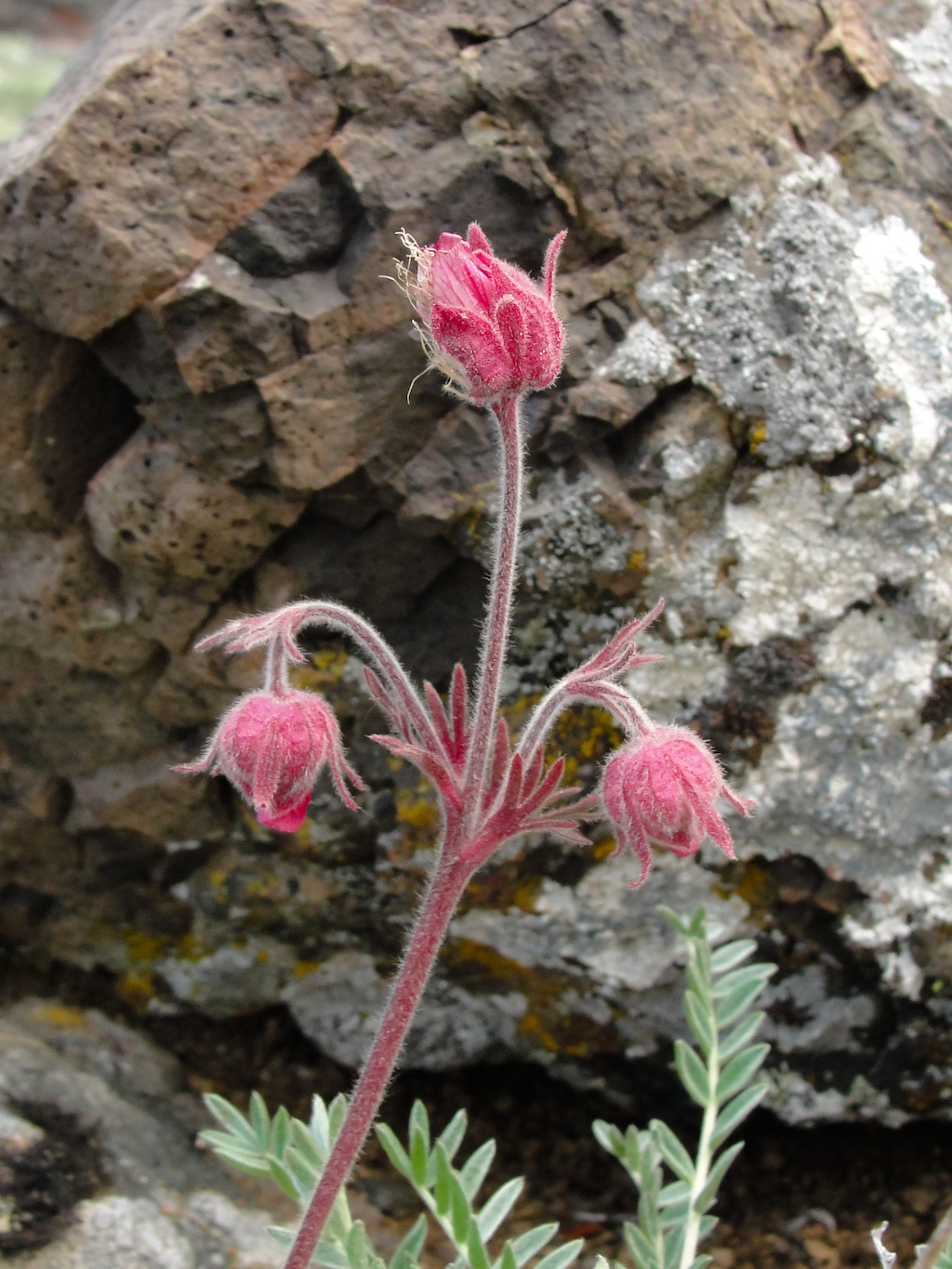
Prairie smoke (Geum triflorum) on Olympic National Forest Mount Townsend Trail

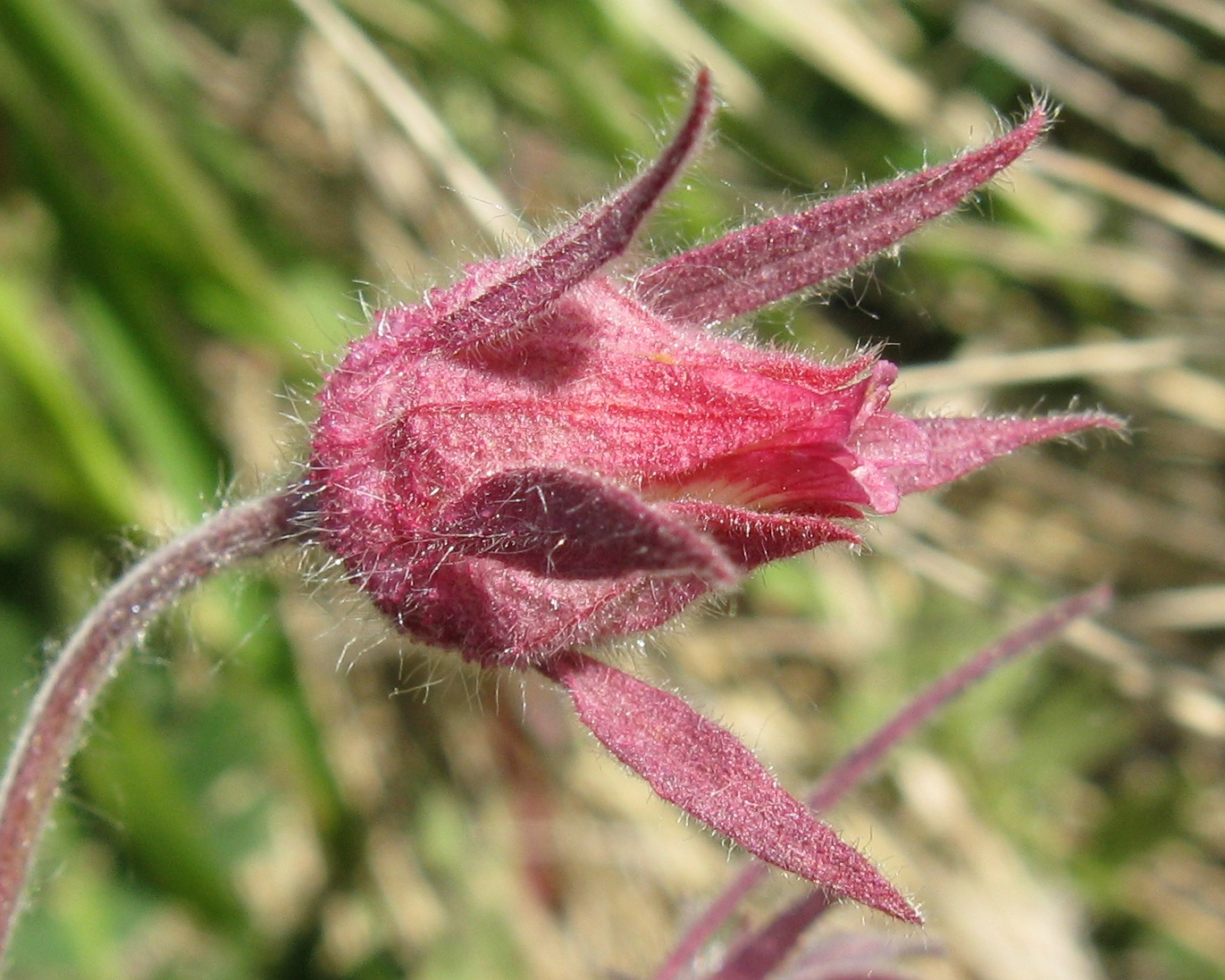
Geum triflorum Saskatchewan, flower side view

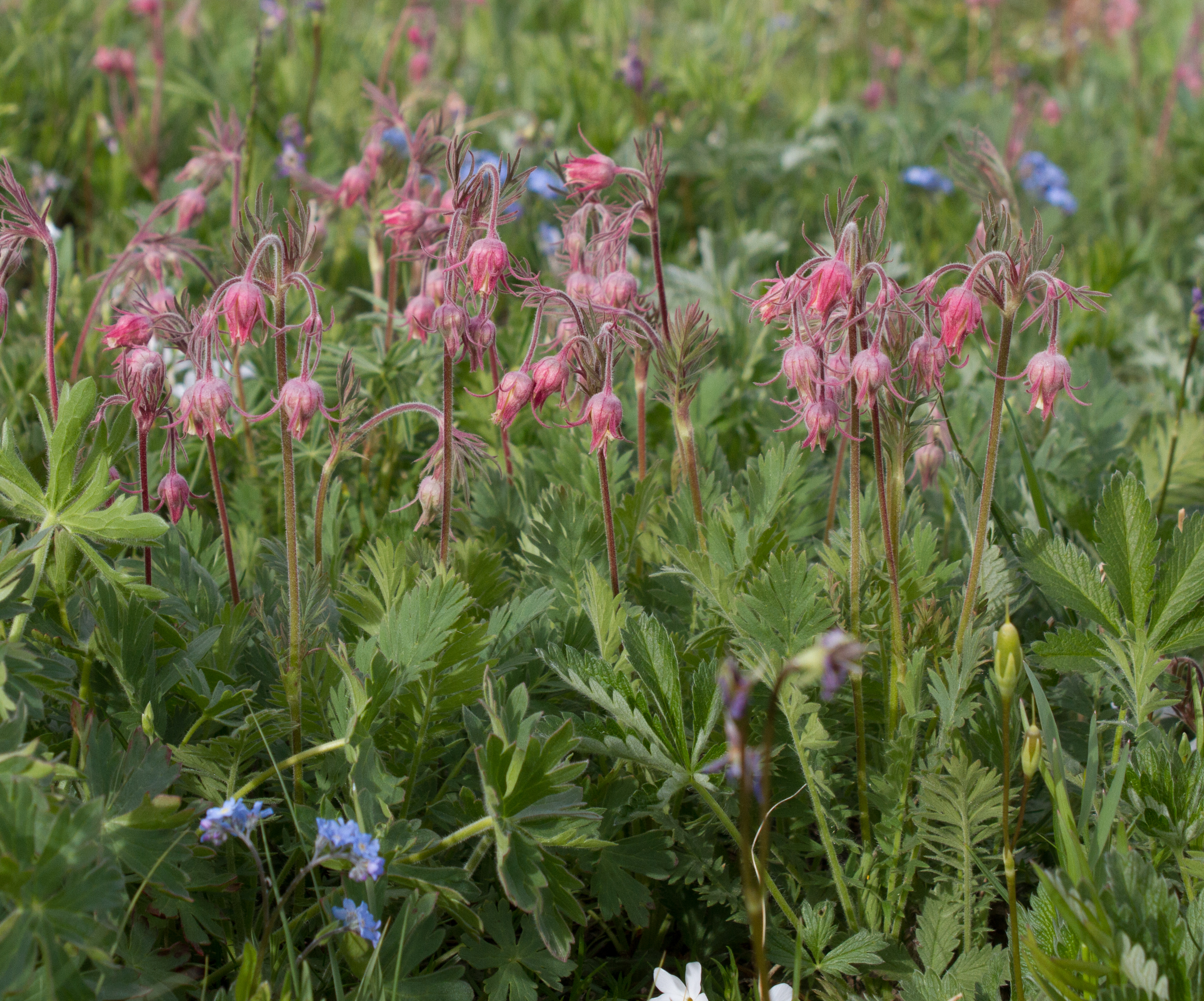
Geum triflorum in meadow habitat Yellowstone National Park. 11 June 2017

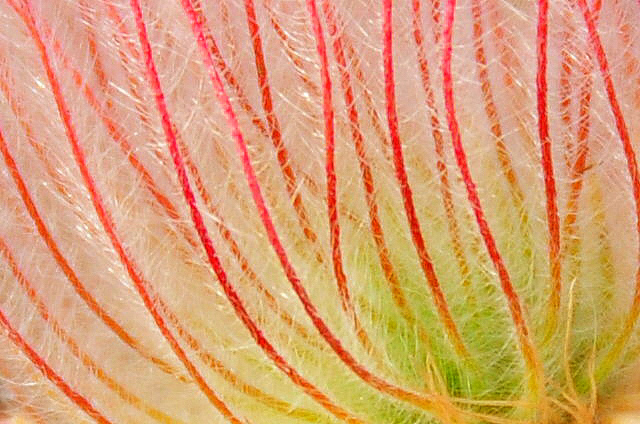
Detail of the styles on a seed head

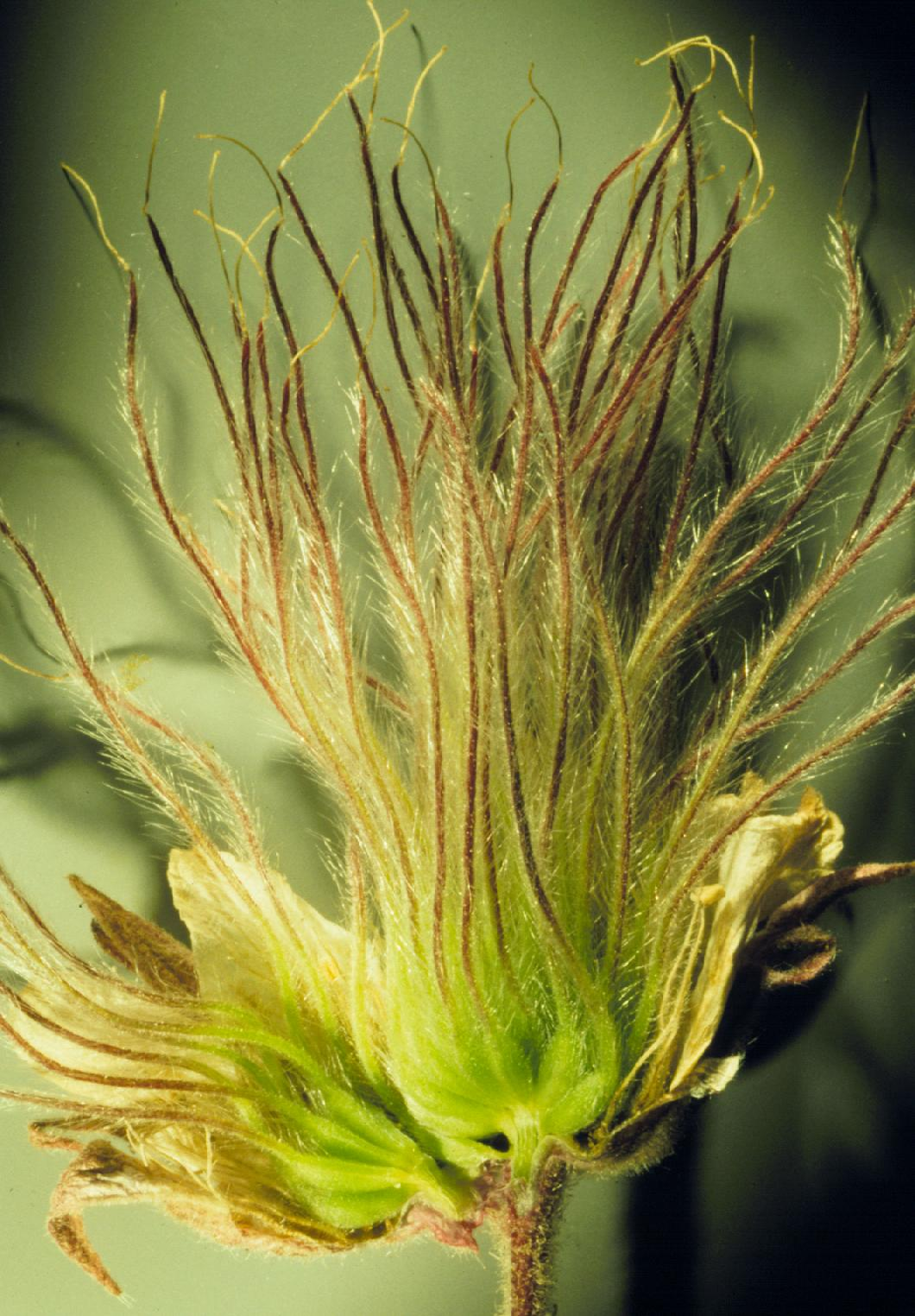
Immature seed head opened to show the achenes sitting in the persistent hypanthium and bearing plumose tails (modified styles)

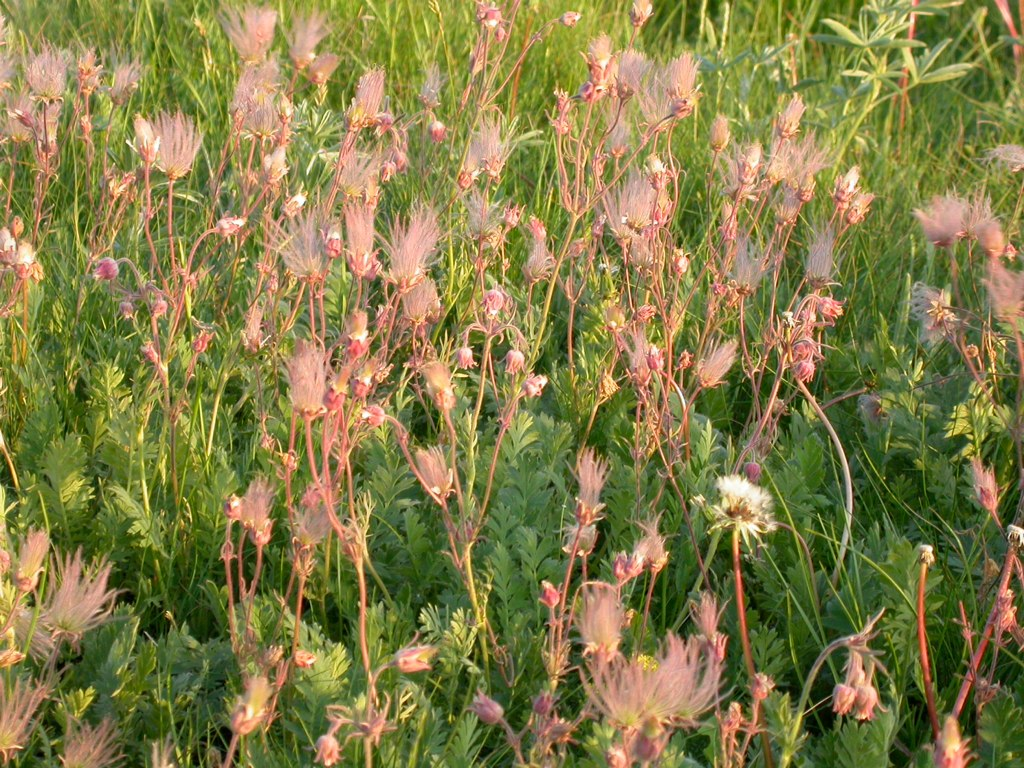
Meadow habitat mid-summer development of seed heads Olympic National Park
