= Draba exunguiculata =

- In Grand County, Colorado

Conservation status
- Imperiled (NatureServe)

Scientific classification
- Kingdom: Plantae
- Clade: Tracheophytes
- Clade: Angiosperms
- Clade: Eudicots
- Clade: Rosids
- Order: Brassicales
- Family: Brassicaceae
- Genus: Draba
- Species: D. exunguiculata

Binomial name
- Draba exunguiculata (O.E.Schulz) C.L.Hitchc.

Synonyms
- Draba chrysantha S.Watson

Plant species in the cabbage family

Draba exunguiculata is a species of flowering plant in the cabbage family known as clawless draba. It is endemic to Colorado in the United States.

This plant is a perennial herb forming a tight clump on the ground. It has a branching caudex and stems just a few centimeters long. It has linear or lance-shaped leaves up to 2.5 centimeters long. The undersides and sometimes the top sides of the leaf blades have tiny hairs. The inflorescence is a raceme of several flowers with yellow petals each up to 3 millimeters long. The plant can be distinguished from Grays Peak draba (Draba grayana), which grows in the same area, by its non-clawed petals and the arrangement of hairs on its stems.

== Taxonomy ==
In 1882 Sereno Watson described a new species in the Draba genus which he named Draba chrysantha, however this was an illegitimate name due to being used previously in another publication. A new description was published in 1927 by Otto Eugen Schulz as a variety called Draba chrysantha var. exunguiculata. In 1941 this was revised to a species named Draba exunguiculata by Charles Leo Hitchcock, the accepted name. Along with the rest of its genus it is part of the Brassicaceae family.

Table of Synonyms
Name	Year	Rank	Notes
Draba chrysantha S.Watson	1882	species	= het., nom. illeg. homonym. post.
Draba chrysantha var. exunguiculata O.E.Schulz	1927	variety	≡ hom.
Draba chrysantha f. perhumilis O.E.Schulz	1927	form	= het.
Notes: ≡ homotypic synonym; = heterotypic synonym

=== Names ===
The species name, exunguiculata, means without claws in Botanical Latin. It is similarly known by the common name clawless draba.

== Range and habitat ==
This plant is a Rocky Mountain endemic that only grows in the state of Colorado, occurring only in the high mountains. It grows in the alpine tundra in rocky meadows, on gravelly slopes, and fellfields as well as in rocky open subalpine habitats, such as open knolls and talus slopes. It grows from as low as 3,566 meters (11,699 ft) to as high as 4,267 meters (13,999 ft), but is more usually found at 3,600–4,000 m (11,800–13,100 ft). It sometimes grows under overhanging rock and between boulders that help protect it from the harsh climate. It is usually distributed in small patches of individuals. Other plants in the habitat include similar cushion plants. Species associated with the draba include Deschampsia caespitosa, Acomastylis rossii, Carex rupestris, Lidia obtusiloba, Trifolium nanum, and Lidia biflora.

The main threat to the species is recreational activity, such as hiking and skiing, in the habitat.
