= Richard Pankhurst =

Richard Pankhurst may refer to:

- Richard Pankhurst (politician) (1834–1898), English barrister and socialist
- Richard Pankhurst (historian) (1927–2017), British scholar
- Richard Pankhurst (botanist) (1940–2013), British computer scientist and botanist
