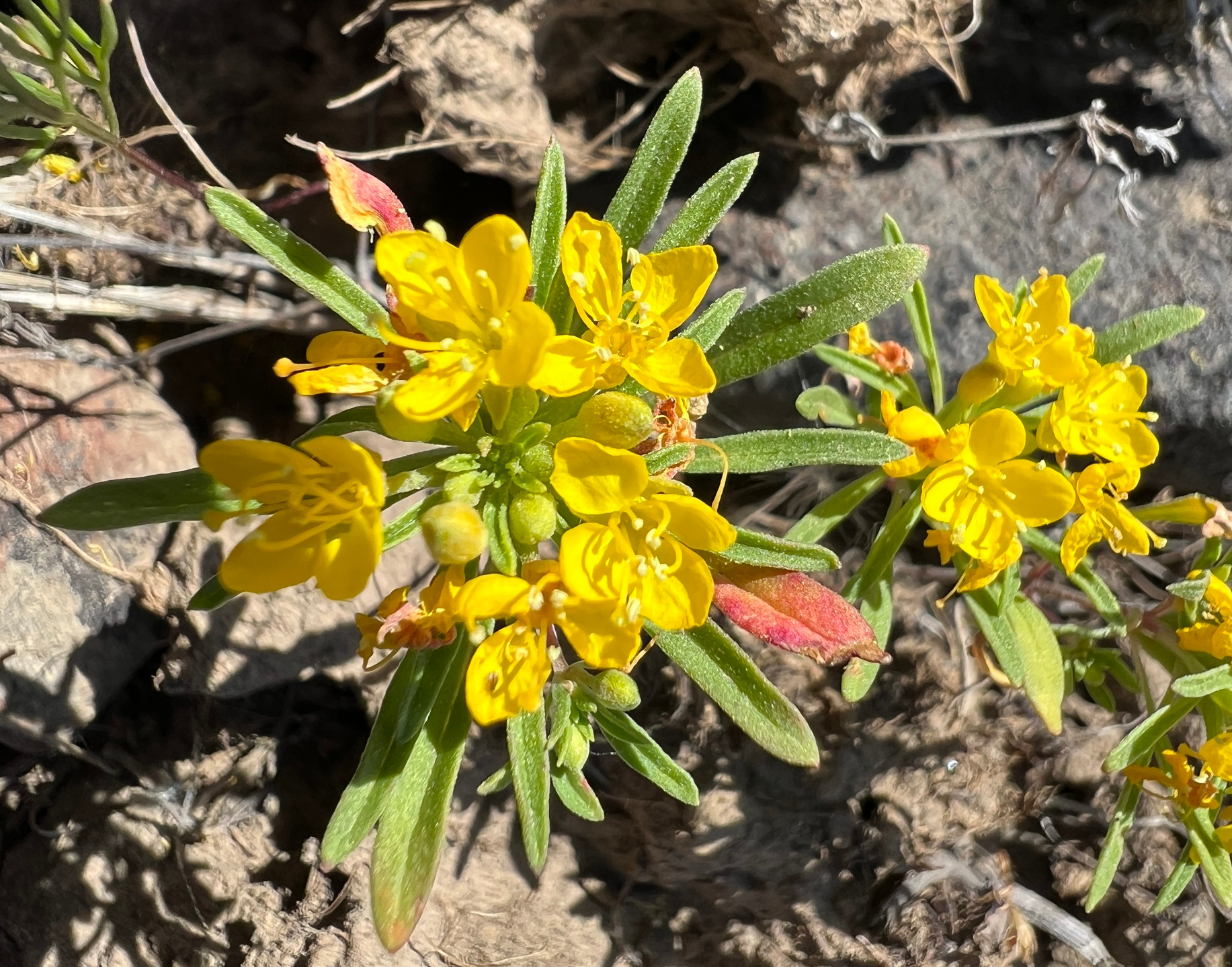

Scientific classification
- Kingdom: Plantae
- Clade: Tracheophytes
- Clade: Angiosperms
- Clade: Eudicots
- Clade: Rosids
- Order: Myrtales
- Family: Onagraceae
- Genus: Neoholmgrenia
- Species: N. hilgardii

Binomial name
- Neoholmgrenia hilgardii (Greene) W.L.Wagner & Hoch

= Neoholmgrenia hilgardii =

Species of flowering plant

Neoholmgrenia hilgardii is an annual flowering plant in the Onagraceae family with the common name Hildgard's suncup. It is a narrow endemic native to central Washington State. This species was first described as Oenothera hilgardii by Greene, and was transferred to the genus Neoholmgrenia in 2009 by W.L.Wagner & Hoch.

== Description ==
Neoholmgrenia hilgardii is a small annual plant up to 15 cm tall, with a crowded tuft of leaves and yellow flowers atop nearly bare stems, which may be single or grow in a cluster. The linear to narrowly spatulate green leaves are up to 25 mm long and 2 mm wide, but often smaller. Both the stem and the leaves are sparsely covered with fine short appressed hairs. The proportionally-large lemon yellow flowers appear in late spring and have 4 ovate petals up to 5 mm long, born singly on short pedicels. The pedicels arise crowded among the alternate leaves and the flowers usually appear nestled near the foliage. The 8 stamens have bright yellow filaments topped by paler anthers.

The very similar species Neoholmgrenia andina is distinguished mostly by much smaller flowers and has a wider range including Oregon and Idaho.

== Range and habitat ==
Neoholmgrenia hilgardii grows in summer dry areas of the Columbia Plateau at moderate elevations in sparsely vegetated areas and among sagebrush. There is a possible historical record in Multnomah Country, Oregon.
