= Draba grayana =

Conservation status
- Vulnerable (NatureServe)

Scientific classification
- Kingdom: Plantae
- Clade: Tracheophytes
- Clade: Angiosperms
- Clade: Eudicots
- Clade: Rosids
- Order: Brassicales
- Family: Brassicaceae
- Genus: Draba
- Species: D. grayana

Binomial name
- Draba grayana (Rydb.) C.L.Hitchc.

Synonyms
- Draba alpicola Osterh.

Plant species in the cabbage family

Draba grayana, the Grays Peak whitlow-grass or Grays Peak draba, is an alpine species from the cabbage family that grows in Colorado and northern New Mexico.

== Description ==
Grays Peak whitlow-grass grows a dense tuft of leaves and stems from a branched caudex. The caudex is covered in the bases of leaf stalks from previous years. The flowering stems do not branch and are 0.8–6 centimeters long with one to four leaves and thickly to moderately covered in unbranched hairs. The thicker covering of hair on the stems distinguishes it from clawless draba (Draba exunguiculata) which has sparse hairs or is hairless.

Most of the leaves are basal, in one or more rosettes. They are attached to the caudex by leaf stalks and can be 0.4–2 cm long, but are most often 0.6–1.5 cm, with a width of just 1–2 millimeters. They are narrow and grass-like, though can be somewhat oblanceolate, with untoothed, smooth edges.

The bright yellow flowers appear in July and August in its native habitat. The four petals are spoon-shaped, 3–4.5 mm long and 1–2 mm wide and curve inwards like claws.

== Taxonomy ==
In 1904 Per Axel Rydberg scientifically described a variety of Draba streptocarpa which he named grayana. This variety was raised to a species in the Draba genus by Charles Leo Hitchcock in 1941. It is classified along with its genus in the Brassicaceae family. The species has one other heterotypic synonym, Draba alpicola, published in 1923 by George Everett Osterhout, which is an illegitimate name, due to the name being used in an 1862 publication by Johann Friedrich Klotzsch.

=== Names ===
The species name is a duel reference to the botanist Asa Gray and to Grays Peak, also named after the botanist, where the species was collected by Rydberg in 1895. It is similarly known by the common names Grays Peak whitlow-grass or Grays Peak draba.

== Range and habitat ==
Grays Peak whitlow-grass is native from northern New Mexico to northern Colorado in the high mountain areas of each state. Until it was collected on Little Costilla Peak in the Culebra Range of the Sangre de Cristo Mountains in 2002, it was thought to be endemic to Colorado. The area of its range is estimated at 20,000–200,000 square kilometers (7,700–77,200 sq mi), though the area it actually occupies within this range is small. Many of its populations are also small, all save one of the 45 documented occurrences having 100 or fewer plants. However, the single largest population has tens of thousands in it. Two of the populations are in northern New Mexico and the rest are found scattered through Colorado. Most of its populations are east of the Continental Divide in Colorado.
