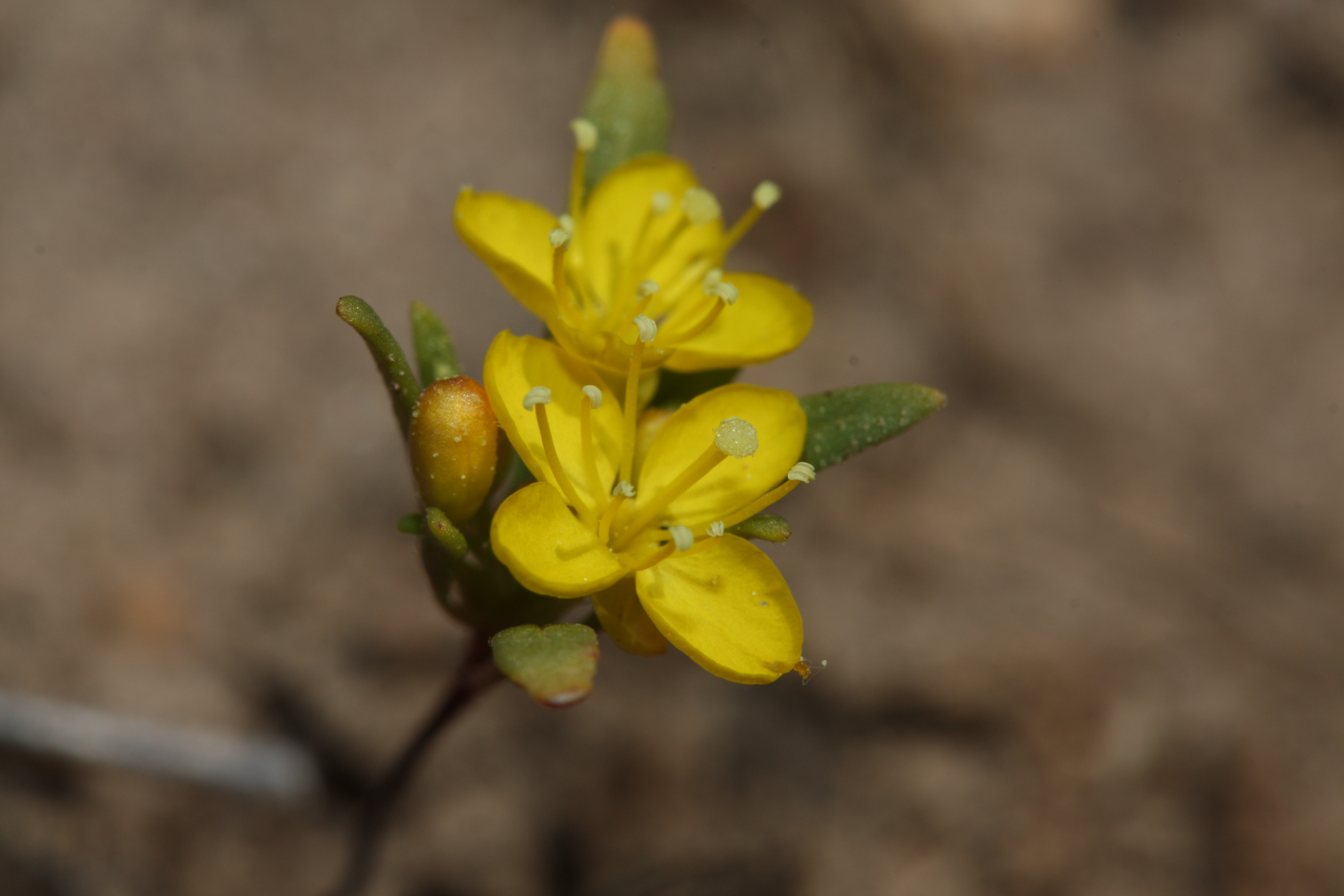
- Neoholmgrenia andina

Scientific classification
- Kingdom: Plantae
- Clade: Tracheophytes
- Clade: Angiosperms
- Clade: Eudicots
- Clade: Rosids
- Order: Myrtales
- Family: Onagraceae
- Subfamily: Onagroideae
- Tribe: Onagreae
- Genus: Neoholmgrenia; W.L.Wagner & Hoch

Synonyms
- Holmgrenia W.L.Wagner & Hoch

= Neoholmgrenia =

Genus of plants

Neoholmgrenia is a genus of flowering plants belonging to the family Onagraceae.

Its native range is Western Canada (in the states of Alberta, British Columbia and Saskatchewan) to Western USA (in the states of California, Colorado, Idaho, Montana, Nevada, Oregon, Utah, Washington and Wyoming).

The genus name of Neoholmgrenia is in honour of Patricia Kern Holmgren (b. 1940) an American botanist. Holmgren's main botanical interests are the flora of the U.S. intermountain west. It also honour's her husband Noel Herman Holmgren (b. 1937) another botanist, and Patricia's father-in-law, Arthur Herman Holmgren (1912–1992) another botanist. It was first described and published in Novon Vol.19 on page 131 in 2009.

== Known species ==
According to Kew:

- Neoholmgrenia andina (Nutt.) W.L.Wagner & Hoch
- Neoholmgrenia hilgardii (Greene) W.L.Wagner & Hoch
