= Index Herbariorum =

Global directory of herbaria and their staff

Index Herbariorum (IH) provides a global directory of herbaria (singular, herbarium; plural, herbaria) and their associated staff. This searchable online database allows scientists rapid access to data related to 4,000+ collections and institutions where more than 400 million botanical specimens are permanently housed, cared for by more than 13,000 staff and associates.

Index Herbariorum was originally published by the International Association for Plant Taxonomy, which sponsored the first six editions (1952–1974). The New York Botanical Garden subsequently assumed editorial responsibility, and the Director of NYBG's Steere Herbarium has since served editor of IH. The Index became available online in 1997, and its database and website continue to be maintained by Steere Herbarium staff.

Entries in IH provide the institution's name (often a university, botanical garden, or not-for-profit organization), location and shipping information (to assist with sending specimen loans and exchanges between institutions), and each herbarium's acronym, along with contact information for staff members and their research specialties, and the important holdings of each herbarium's collection. New entries and changes to existing entries are provided by users themselves, via a form and ticketing system, and are entered into the database after review by the IH editor.

== Editors ==
- 6th edition (1974) was co-edited by Patricia Kern Holmgren, Director of the New York Botanical Garden's Steere Herbarium
- 7th printed edition (1981), ed. by Patricia Kern Holmgren
- 8th printed edition (1990), ed. by Patricia Kern Holmgren
- Online edition, prepared by Noel Holmgren of the New York Botanical Garden
- 2008-2026, ed. by Barbara M. Thiers, Director of the New York Botanical Garden's Steere Herbarium
- 2026-, ed. by Emily B. Sessa, Director of the New York Botanical Garden's Steere Herbarium
