= Patricia Kern Holmgren =

American botanist

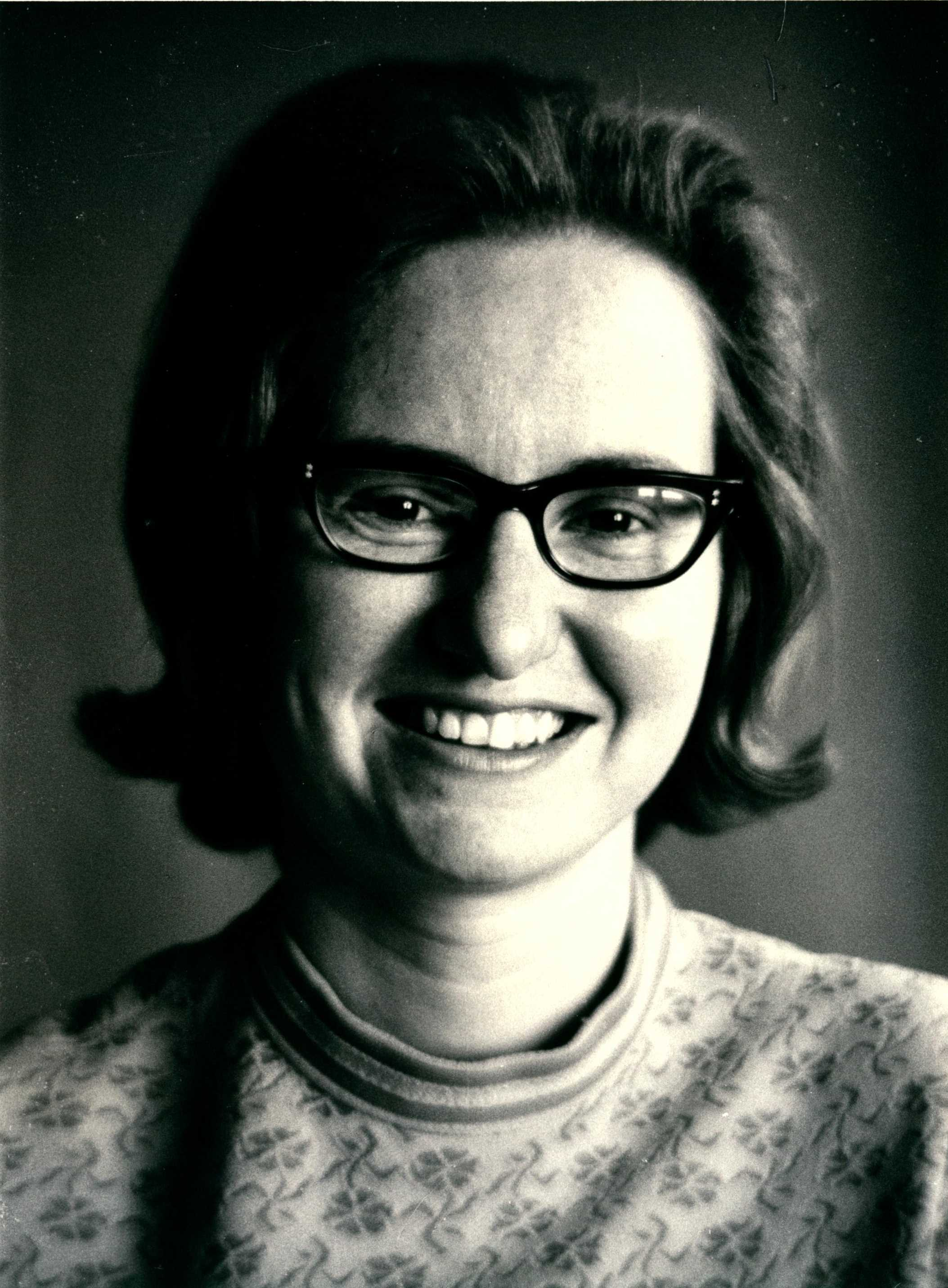
- Patricia Kern Holmgren in 1971
- Born: 1940 (age 85–86); Athens, Indiana, U.S.
- Education: Indiana University (B.S.); University of Washington (M.S., Ph.D.)
- Spouse: Noel H. Holmgren
- Scientific career
- Fields: Botany
- Workplaces: New York Botanical Garden
- Doctoral advisor: Charles Leo Hitchcock
- Author abbrev. (botany): P.K. Holmgren

Patricia May Holmgren (née Kern; born 1940) is an American botanist. Holmgren's main botanical interests are the flora of the U.S. intermountain west and the genera Tiarella and Thlaspi. Holmgren was the director of the herbarium at the New York Botanical Garden from 1981–2000, and editor of Index Herbariorum from 1974–2008.

== Life ==
Patricia May Kern was born to Robert Evan Kern (1919–2004) and Ruth Eleanor Beaudoin Kern (1921–1992) in 1940, in Athens, Indiana. Her parents began raising Christmas trees in 1946, and Holmgren spent part of her summers trimming trees and weekends in the fall and winter helping with the business. Holmgren was introduced to nature at an early age; through her father's conservation work on their property, and during family vacations to western national parks during the farm's off-season. From fifth grade to her high school graduation, Holmgren was active in 4-H, winning many contests in forestry and sewing.

Holmgren attended high school at Rochester High School in Rochester, Indiana, graduating in 1958 as valedictorian. Holmgren attended Indiana University, getting a B.S. in 1962. She later attended the University of Washington, completing a M.S. in 1964 and a Ph.D. in 1968. At the University of Washington, Holmgren completed a systematic study of Tiarella (Saxifragaceae) with advisor Arthur R. Kruckeberg.

She remained at the University of Washington for her Ph.D., a systematic study of the Thlaspi montanum (Brassicaceae) group, with advisor C. Leo Hitchcock. In addition to her own research, Holmgren became chief editorial assistant during the preparation of the last two volumes of the Vascular Plants of the Pacific Northwest with Hitchcock.

Patricia married fellow botanist Noel H. Holmgren (son of botanist Arthur H. Holmgren) in 1969.

== Career ==
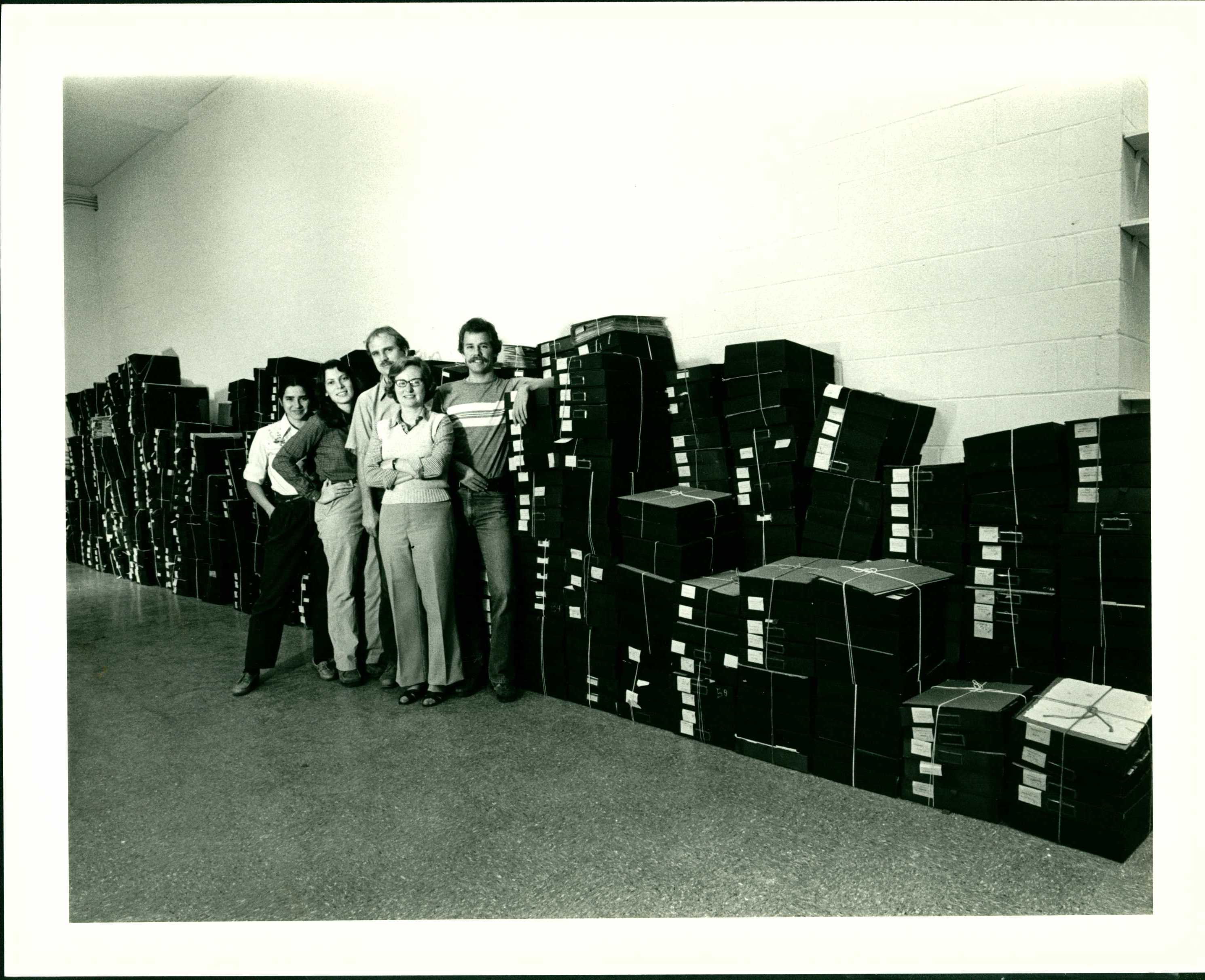
Patricia Holmgren (front) with fellow New York Botanical Garden herbarium staff (behind, L to R): Lois Brako, Barbara Thiers, Bill Buck, & Jim Grimes.

After completing her Ph.D. at the University of Washington, Holmgren accepted a job as herbarium specialist at the New York Botanical Garden (NYBG) in 1968. Holmgren spent her entire working career at NYBG, eventually becoming the Director of the Herbarium in 1981, a position she held until her retirement in 2000. As director of The William and Lynda Steere Herbarium, Holmgren insisted on the highest possible standards for specimen management and for keeping the herbarium in the forefront on new innovations (such as the creation of an online Index Herbariorum and development of the C.V. Starr Virtual Herbarium). Holmgren was also instrumental in conception, fundraising, and design of a new, state-of-the-art building to house the herbarium, the International Plant Science Center, which officially opened for research in 2002. Holmgren continues to work at the garden as Director Emerita of the herbarium. In addition to her herbarium leadership, Holmgren played an active role in a number of botanical societies and botanical journals:

- American Society of Plant Taxonomists: Council member (1975–1979), Treasurer (1985–1988), President (1989–1990)
- Association of Systematics Collections: Board of Directors (1988–1994), Secretary (1992–1994)
- Botanical Society of America: Council member (1975–1984), Secretary (1975–1979), Vice President (1980), President (1981)
- Brittonia: Associate Editor (1975–1991), Managing Editor (1984–1991)
- Index Herbariorum: Editor (1974–2008)
- International Association for Plant Taxonomy: Board of Directors (1993–2005)
- Taxon: Editor of News and Notes (1983–1988), Editor of Herbaria and Institutions (1992–2002)

Patricia Holmgren and Noel Holmgren were instrumental to the completion of Intermountain Flora: Vascular Plants of the Intermountain West, U.S.A., a nine-volume flora on the vascular plants of the western United States between the Rocky Mountains and Sierra Nevada ranges. In addition to collecting many herbarium specimens that would provide the baseline data for descriptions and geographic distributions; Patricia was involved in editing, proofreading, and writing family treatments for the flora.

== Awards ==
- The New York Botanical Garden's Distinguished Service Award (1988)
- Botanical Society of America Distinguished Fellow (Merit) Award (1991)
- Botanical Society of America Centennial Award (2006)
- The American Society of Plant Taxonomists's Asa Gray Award (2012), jointly with Noel Holmgren
- The New York Botanical Garden's Gold Medal Award (2013), jointly with Noel Holmgren

== Legacy ==
In 2009, botanists W.L.Wagner & Hoch published Neoholmgrenia is a genus of flowering plants from Canada and western USA, belonging to the family Onagraceae and named in her honour.

=== Plant species named after Patricia Holmgren ===
- Astragalus holmgreniorum Barneby—named in honor of Patricia Holmgren and Noel Holmgren
- Bartsia patriciae N.H. Holmgren
- Carex holmgreniorum Reznicek & D.F. Murray — named in honor of Arthur H. Holmgren, Noel Holmgren, and Patricia Holmgren
- Hiraea holmgreniorum C.E. Anderson—named in honor of Patricia Holmgren and Noel Holmgren
- Mentzelia holmgreniorum J.J. Schenk & L. Hufford—named in honor of Patricia Holmgren and Noel Holmgren
- Orthocarpus tolmiei subsp. holmgreniorum T.I. Chuang & Heckard—named in honor of Arthur H. Holmgren, Noel Holmgren, and Patricia Holmgren
- Scutellaria holmgreniorum Cronquist—named in honor of Patricia Holmgren and Noel Holmgren

== Selected publications ==
- Holmgren, P.K. & Keuken, W. (1975). Index Herbariorum Ed. 6: Geographical Arrangements of the Herbaria Listed in Index Herbariorum, Edition Six. Taxon, 24(4), 543-551. JSTOR 1219533
- Holmgren, N.H. & Holmgren, P.K. (1979). A new species of Asclepias (Asclepiadaceae) from Utah. Brittonia, 31(1): 110–114. doi:10.2307/2806683
- Rollins, R.C. & Holmgren, P.K. (1980). A new species of Caulanthus (Cruciferae) from Nevada. Brittonia, 32(2): 148–151. doi:10.2307/2806781
- Holmgren, P.K., Holmgren, N.H., & Barnett L.C. (1990). Index herbariorum. Part I: The herbaria of the world, Edition 8. ISBN 0-89327-358-9
- Holmgren, P.K., & Holmgren, N. H. (1991). Index Herbariorum: Additions to Index Herbariorum, Edition 8. Taxon, 40(4), 687–692. JSTOR 1222796
- Holmgren, P.K., Kallunki, J.A. & Thiers, B.M. (1996). A short description of the collections of The New York Botanical Garden Herbarium (NY). Brittonia, 48(3): 285–296. doi:10.1007/BF02805288
- Holmgren, N.H., & Holmgren, P.K. (2002). New Mentzelias (Loasaceae) from the Intermountain Region of Western United States. Systematic Botany, 27(4): 747–762. JSTOR 3093920
- Holmgren, P.K. (2004). Lectotypifications and a new combination in western North American Cleomaceae. Brittonia, 56(2): 103–106.doi:10.1663/0007-196X(2004)056[0103:LAANCI]2.0.CO;2
- Holmgren, N.H. & Holmgren, P.K. (2010). New combinations and lectotypifications of North American taxa in Caryophyllaceae, Chenopodiaceae, Fumariaceae, Montiaceae, Papaveraceae, and Ranunculaceae. Brittonia, 62(3): 264–266. doi:10.1007/s12228-010-9149-x
