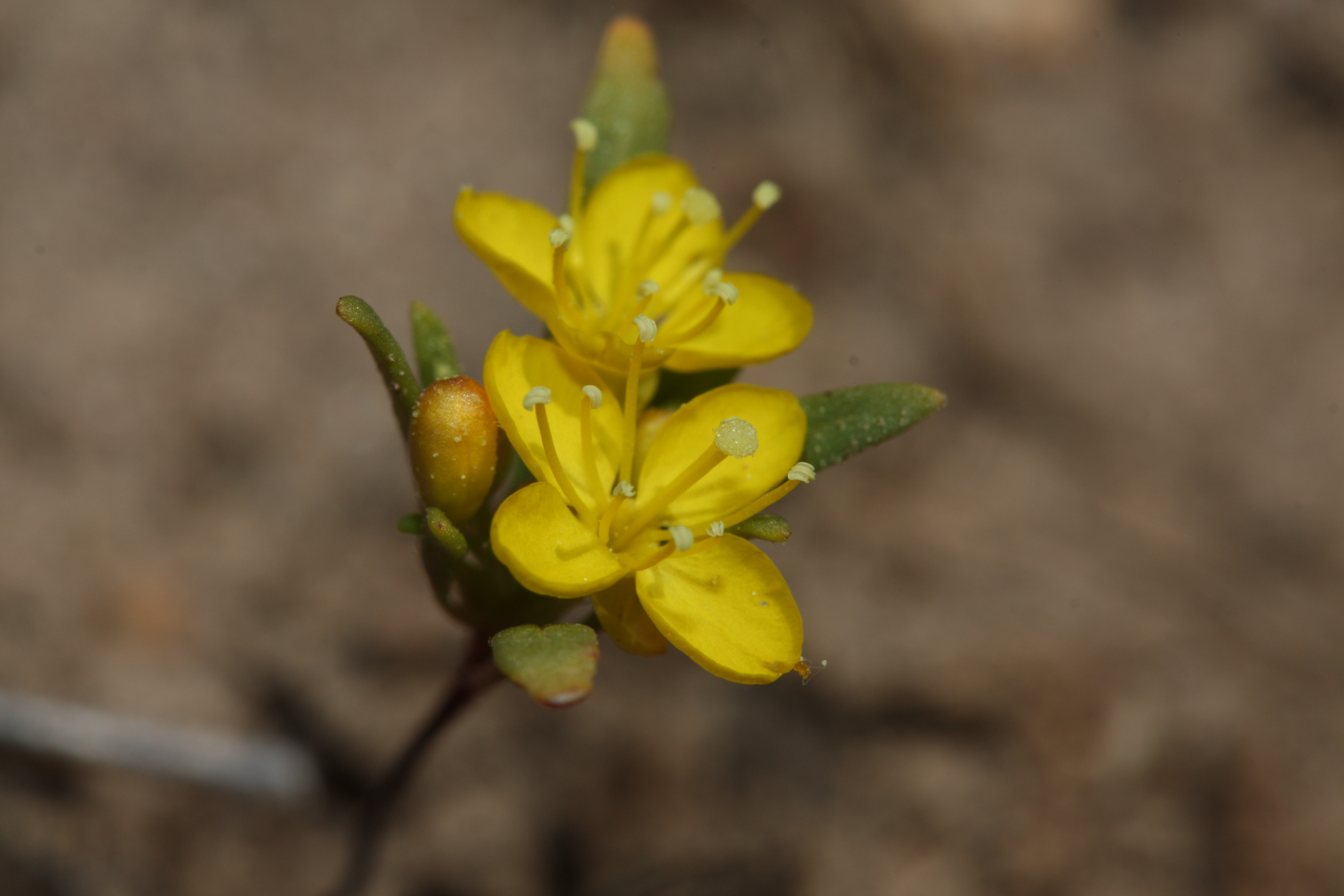
- Neoholmgrenia andina in Wenas Wildlife Area, Washington

Conservation status
- Apparently Secure (NatureServe)

Scientific classification
- Kingdom: Plantae
- Clade: Tracheophytes
- Clade: Angiosperms
- Clade: Eudicots
- Clade: Rosids
- Order: Myrtales
- Family: Onagraceae
- Genus: Neoholmgrenia
- Species: N. andina

Binomial name
- Neoholmgrenia andina (Nutt.) W.L.Wagner & Hoch

Synonyms
- Camissonia andina (Nutt.) P.H.Raven; Holmgrenia andina (Nutt.) W.L.Wagner & Hoch, nom. illeg.; Oenothera andina Nutt.; Sphaerostigma andinum (Nutt.) Walp.

= Neoholmgrenia andina =

Plant species in the evening primrose family

Neoholmgrenia andina is a species of evening primrose known by the common name Blackfoot River evening primrose. It is native to western North America, including southern Canada and much of the western United States, where it is a plant of mountains, and sagebrush plateaus.

== Description ==
It is a small annual herb growing a hairy, branching stem generally under 15 centimeters tall. The bunched leaves are widely lance-shaped and 1 to 3 centimeters long. The inflorescence bears one or more flowers with usually four tiny bright yellow petals. The fruit is a flat capsule up to a centimeter long.
