= Kanchi Gandhi =

Indian botanist

Dr. Kanchi Gandhi
- Kancheepuram Natarajan Gandhi
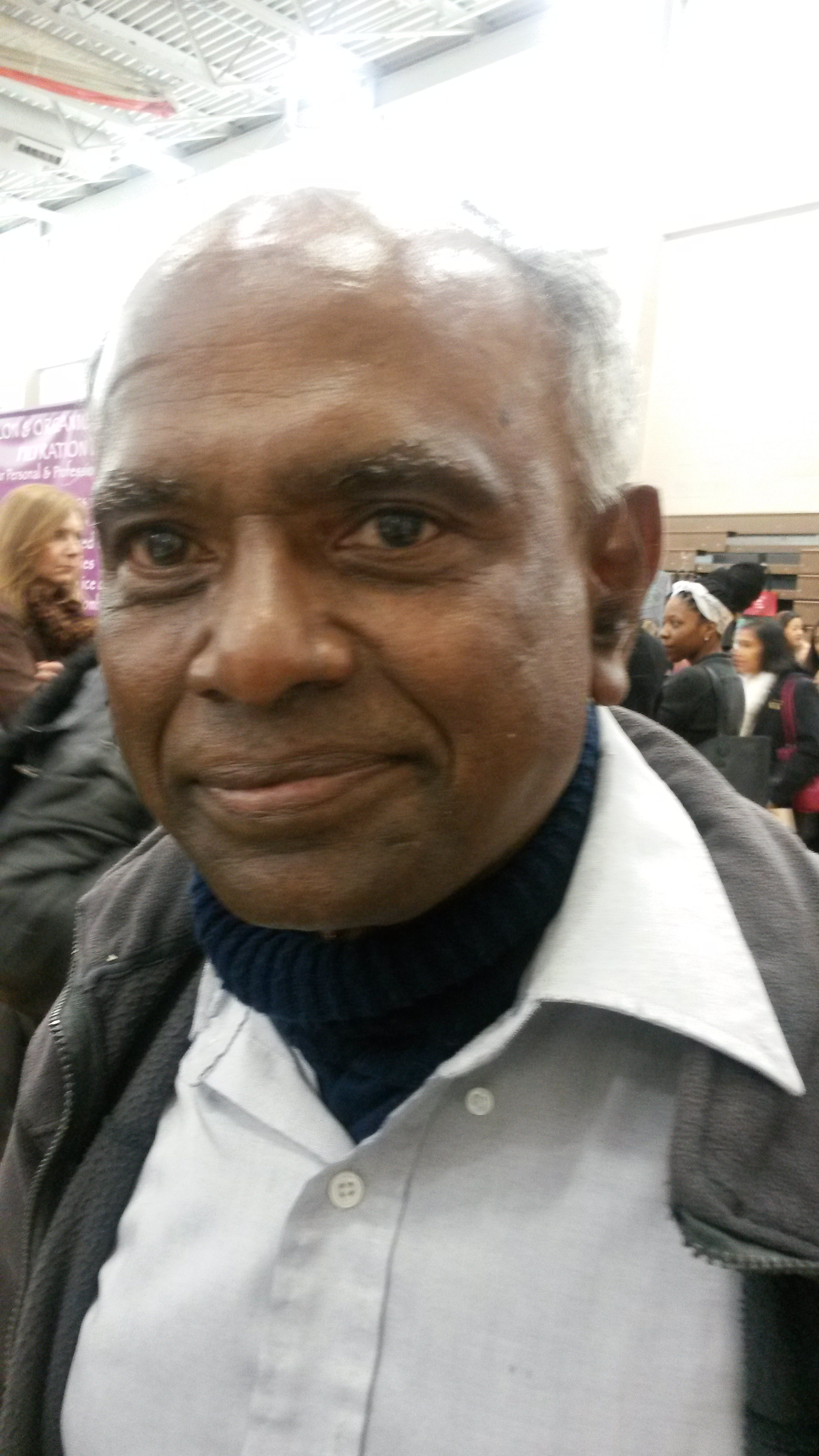
- Gandhi in 2015
- Born: January 28, 1948 (age 78); India
- Other names: Kanchi Gandhi, Kanchi N. Gandhi
- Citizenship: USA
- Education: University of Louisiana at Monroe
- Alma mater: Texas A&M University
- Scientific career
- Fields: phytochemistry, botany
- Workplaces: Harvard University
- Author abbrev. (botany): Gandhi

Kancheepuram (Kanchi) Natarajan Gandhi (born January 28, 1948, in India) is Senior Nomenclature Registrar and Bibliographer at Harvard University in the Department of Botany in the Harvard University Herbaria & Libraries (HUH and HUL). He manages a botanical classification project to identify and classify all plants in the Western world (the New World) through his role at Harvard, where Harvard's newly adopted “open-access digitization policy” assigns to the public domain most of the images of plants he and others have classified and preserved.

He is famous for his long-held role as part of the collaboration between The Royal Botanic Gardens, Kew, The Harvard University Herbaria, and the Australian National Herbarium in developing the International Plant Names Index, a database of the names and associated bibliographical details of seed plants, ferns, and lycophytes.

== Biography ==
Before his recruitment by Harvard University in the 1990s, he was a research associate at the University of North Carolina at Chapel Hill (Jan 1990 – Jul 1995), Before that, he taught botany at Calicut University in Kerala, South India.

Gandhi frequently travels to India to lecture on vascular plant systematics, plant nomenclature, plant morphology, plant geography, and plant taxonomy, especially Asteraceae and Poaceae, as he did in 2012, 2013, 2014 and 2017, for reunions with his former students in India, who are or are not doing botany, and to transfer his expertise to botanists in India.

His current projects include:

- Indexing Vascular Plant Names of the New World;
- Updating Database Files on Authors, Collectors & Publications;
- Analyzing Nomenclatural Problems for the Old and New Worlds;
- Bibliography of Vascular Plant Names
- International Plant Name Index
- Harvard University Herbaria (HUH) lookup tables
- Flora of North America project.

== Education ==
- PhD, Range Science/Botany, Texas A&M University, 1984 – 1989.
- MS, Biology, University of Louisiana at Monroe, 1982 – 1984.

== Awards ==
- 2017 - Government of India invited Dr. Gandhi to lecture for three weeks at several universities in India.
- 2017 - In March 2017, during a three-week skill-building tour of India designed to teach and transfer Greek and Latin botanical classification skills to Indian botanists, Dr. Gandhi received a Memento at Pune.
- 2017 - Lectured on "Plants, Society & Law" on February 24, 2017, at Nalanda University.
- 2010 - "Distinguished Service Award" from the American Society of Plant Taxonomists

== Professional activities ==
- Editor, International Plant Names Index
- Collaborator, Index Nominum Genericorum (Plantarum)
- Member, Committee for the Spermatophyta, International Association for Plant Taxonomy
- Associate editor, journal Rhodora
- Nomenclature Consultant, journal Novon
- Councillor, New England Botanical Society
- Associate Nomenclature Editor, Taxon
- Nomenclature Editor for Systematic Botany, the quarterly international scientific journal for the American Society of Plant Taxonomists (ASPT)

== Selected publications ==
- Wiersema, J., Gandhi, K. (385–388) "Proposals to amend Articles 32.2, 23.5, and 24.2 to clarify the treatment of transcribed Greek terminations of epithets". Taxon (2016).
- McNeill, J., Barrie, F., Gandhi, K., Hollowell, V., Redhead, S., Söderström, L., Zarucchi, J. "Report of the special committee on publications using a largely mechanical method of selection of types (Art. 10.5(b)) (especially under the American code)". Taxon (2016).
- McNeill, J., Barrie, F., Gandhi, K., Hollowell, V., Redhead, S., Söderström, L., Zarucchi, J. "(391–396) proposals to amend the provisions of the code on selection of types of generic names using a largely mechanical method". Taxon (2016)
- Flagg, R., Smith, G., Garland, M., Gandhi, K. "(2481) proposal to conserve the name Amaryllis atamasco (Zephyranthes atamasco) with that spelling (Amaryllidaceae)". Taxon (2016).
- Gandhi, K. "Dan Henry Nicolson (1933-2016): A personal remembrance". Taxon (2016).
- Gandhi, K. "Staghorn Sumac: Rhus typhina or R. hirta (Anacardiaceae)" https://dx.doi.org/10.3119/15-37, Rhodora vol. 118, issue 974 (2016) pp. 232–234 Published by New England Botanical Club.
- Barkworth, M., Cialdella, A., Gandhi, K. "Piptochaetium fuscum (Nees ex Steud.), a new combination replacing Piptochaetium setosum (Trin.) Arechav". PhytoKeys, vol. 35 (2014) pp. 17–22.
- Tucker, G., Gandhi, K. "Nomenclatural Notes on Neotropical Cyperus (Cyperaceae)". Harvard Papers in Botany, vol. 18, issue 2 (2013) pp. 149–154 Published by Harvard University Herbaria.
- Gandhi, K. N., Young, S. M. & Somers, P. 2003. "A Reassessment of the Taxonomy of Liatris borealis Nutt. ex J. McNab and Lacinaria scariosa var. novae-angliae Lunell (Asteraceae)". Taxon 52(2): 313–318.
- Hatch, S. L., Gandhi, K. N. & Brown, L. E. 1990. "Checklist of the Vascular Plants of Texas". Texas Agricultural Communication, Misc. Pub. 1655. 157 pages.
- C. J. Saldanha & Nicolson, D. H. (eds.). 1976. "Flora of Hassan District, Karnataka, India". With contributions by ... K. N. Gandhi ... Published for the Smithsonian Institution and the National Science Foundation, Washington, D.C., by Amerind Publishing Co., Pvt. Ltd., New Delhi (India). 915 pages.
- Gandhi, K. N., Wiersema, J. H. & Soreng, R. J. 2001. "Proposal to conserve the name Bouteloua gracilis (Kunth) Griffiths against B. gracilis Vasey (Poaceae)". Taxon 50: 573–575.
- Gandhi, K. N. 1999. "Nomenclatural novelties for the Western Hemisphere Plants-II". Harvard Pap. Bot. 4(1): 295–299.
- Gandhi, K. N. & Fryxell, P. A. 1990. "Nomenclatural note on Eupatorium fistulosum (Asteraceae)". Sida 14: 129–131.
- Gandhi, K. N & Kartesz, J. T. 1993. "Five miscellaneous proposals to amend the Code". Taxon 42: 180–182.

== Personal life ==
Gandhi is married, living west of Boston, and his daughter is a medical student. He is a lifelong vegetarian and a member of the Boston Vegetarian Society.

== See also ==
- International Plant Names Index (IPNI)
- Phytochemistry
