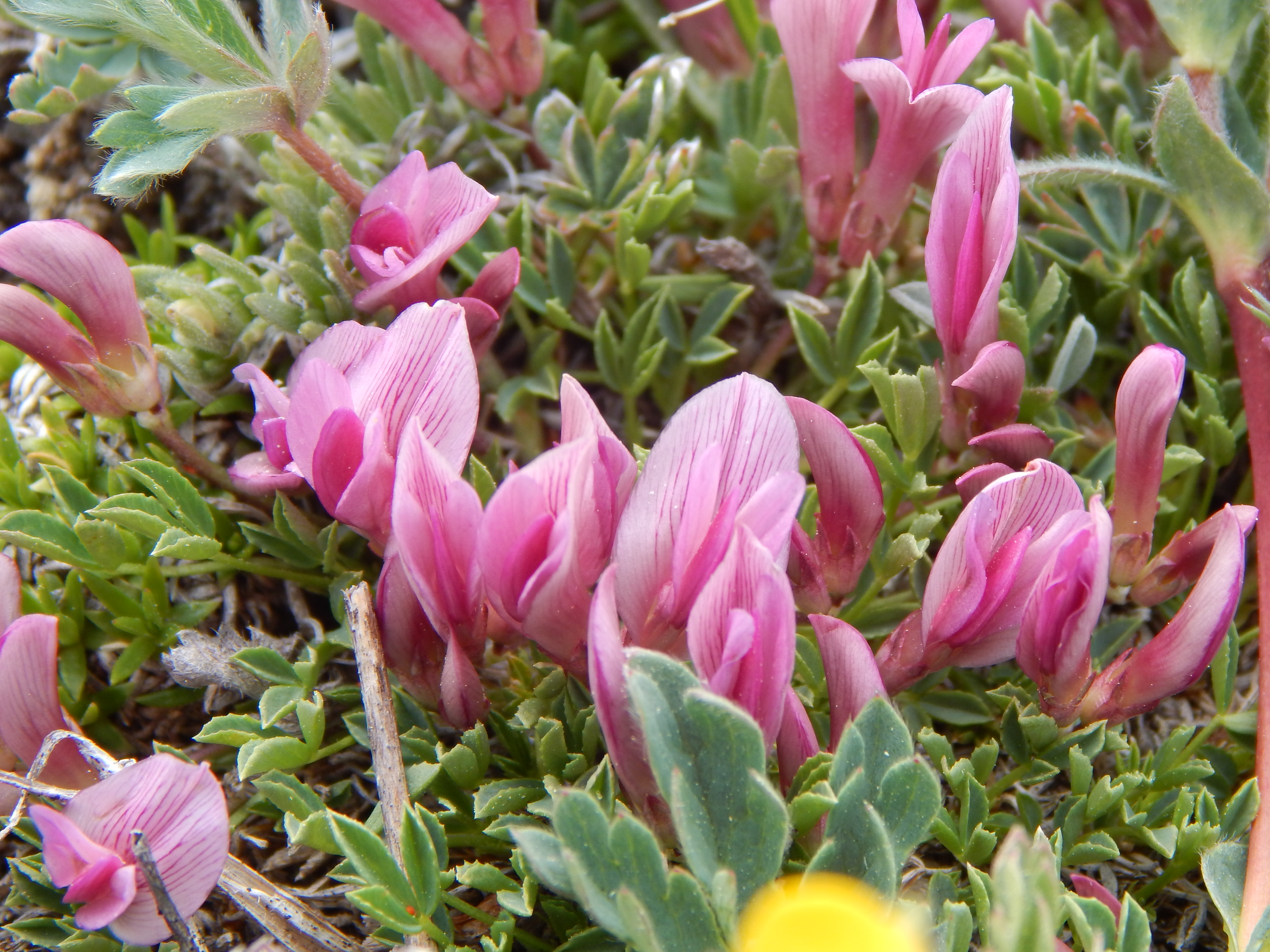
- Dwarf clover flowers and leaves

Conservation status
- Apparently Secure (NatureServe)

Scientific classification
- Kingdom: Plantae
- Clade: Tracheophytes
- Clade: Angiosperms
- Clade: Eudicots
- Clade: Rosids
- Order: Fabales
- Family: Fabaceae
- Subfamily: Faboideae
- Genus: Trifolium
- Species: T. nanum

Binomial name
- Trifolium nanum Torr.

= Trifolium nanum =

Plant species in the pea family

Trifolium nanum, the dwarf clover, is a perennial plant from the family Fabaceae.

== Description ==
Trifolium nanum is a perennial plant small species of clover. The flowers are pink and pea-shaped, blooming June through August.

== Taxonomy ==
The species was first recorded by Edwin James in 1820. Nanum means 'dwarf' in Latin.

== Distribution and habitat ==
It grows in the Rocky Mountains, often at more than 3,400 meters (11,000 ft). It is able to survive extreme conditions such as blizzards and extreme cold. Dwarf clover grows in dense mats to survive in its environment of dry, nutrient poor, rocky terrain.
