= Richard Pankhurst (botanist) =

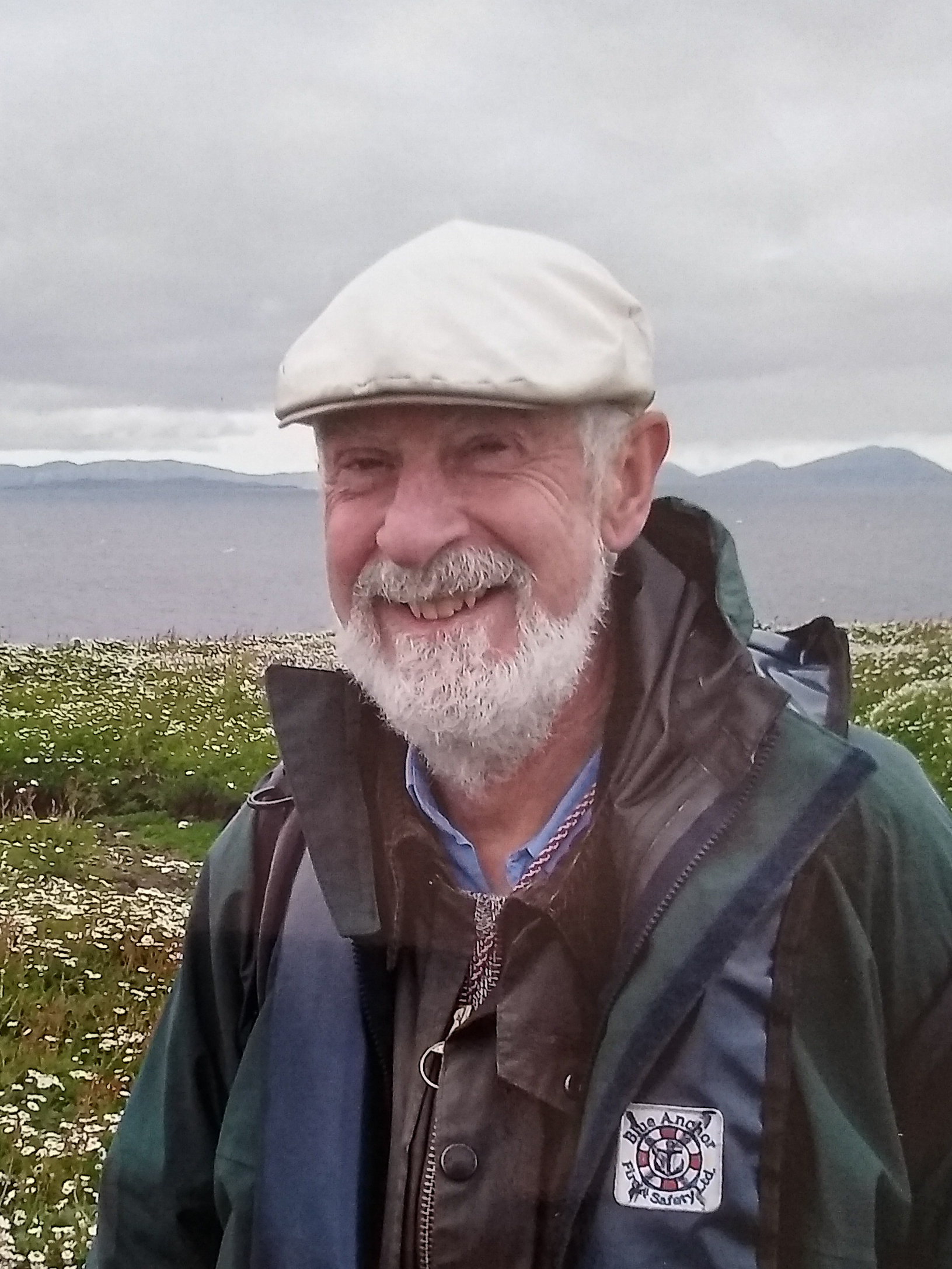
- Richard Pankhurst, Outer Hebrides. Photo: Claudia Ferguson-Smyth
- Born: Richard John Pankhurst; 1940
- Died: 26 March 2013 (aged 72–73)
- Occupation: Botanist
- Scientific career
- Fields: Botany, Biodiversity informatics
- Workplaces: Natural History Museum, London, Royal Botanic Garden Edinburgh

Richard John Pankhurst (1940–2013) was a British computer scientist, botanist and academic. From 1963 to 1966 he worked at CERN, then from 1966 to 1974 on computer-aided design at Cambridge University, and from 1974 to 1991 at the Natural History Museum as curator of the British herbarium. In 1991, he became a Principal Scientific Officer at the Royal Botanic Garden Edinburgh.

He published over fifty peer reviewed papers and sat on several committees:

- Botanical Society of the British Isles: Committee for Scotland; Database Committee
- Botanical Society of Scotland: Council
- Biodiversity Information Standards (TDWG): Descriptors Group (as convenor)
- International Organisation for Plant Information: Information Systems Committee, Checklist Committee (co-convener)

His book Biological Identification (1978) has been described as " the first textbook on computer methods in identification".

Pankhurst died in 2013, a year after the species Taraxacum pankhurstianum, endemic to St. Kilda, was named in his honour, for his suggestion that the seed from which it was grown at Edinburgh be collected.

== Selected works ==
- Pankhurst, R.J. (1970), "A computer program for generating diagnostic keys", The Computer Journal, 13 (2): 145–151, doi:10.1093/comjnl/13.2.145
- Pankhurst, R.J., ed. (1975), Biological identification with computers, vol. Systematics Association Special Volume 7, London and Orlando: Academic Press, ISBN 978-0125448505
- Pankhurst, Richard J. (1978). Biological Identification: The Principles and Practice of Identification Methods in Biology. Edward Arnold. ISBN 9780839113447.
- Pankhurst, Richard J.; Mullin, J.M. (1991). Flora of the Outer Hebrides. Pelagic Publishing Limited. ISBN 9781907807497.
- Pankhurst, Richard J. (1991). Practical Taxonomic Computing. Cambridge University Press. ISBN 9780521417600.
- Pankhurst, R.J. (1993), "Principles and practices of identification", in R. Fortuner (ed.), Advances in computer methods for systematic biology: Artificial intelligence, databases, computer vision, Baltimore: The Johns Hopkins University Press, pp. 125–136, ISBN 0801844924
