= Charles Leo Hitchcock =

American botanist (1902–1986)

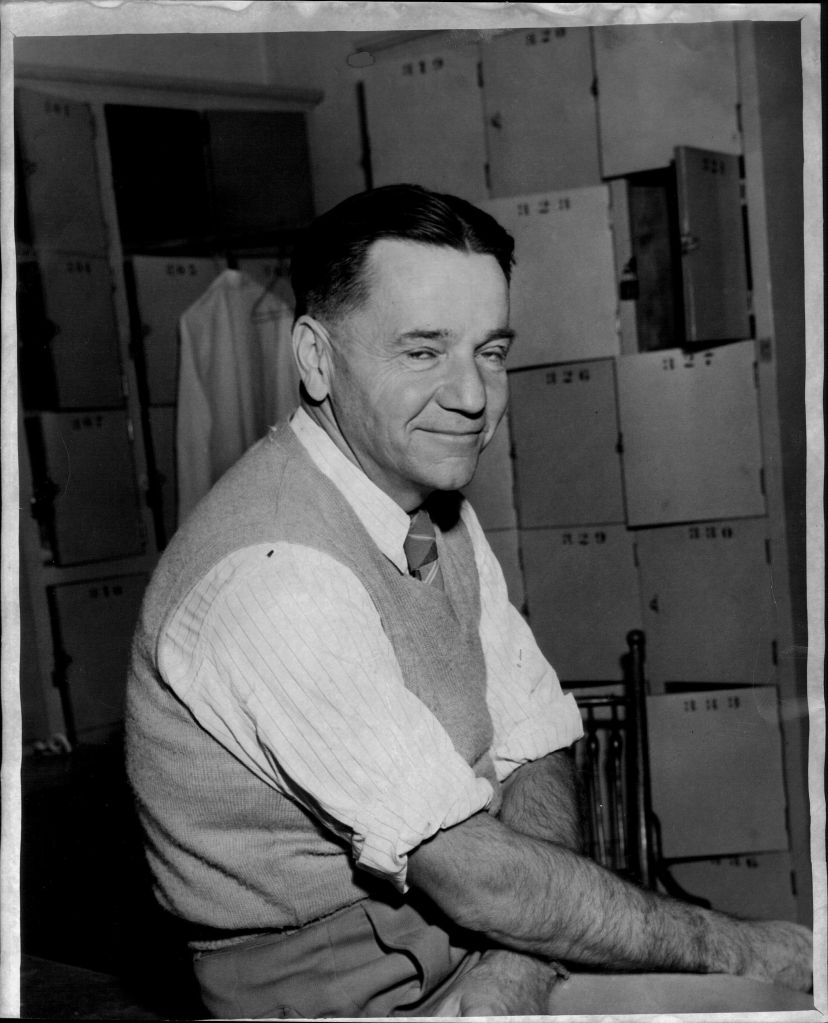
- Born: April 23, 1902; California
- Died: February 3, 1986 (aged 83); Seattle, Washington
- Scientific career
- Fields: Botany
- Institutions: University of Washington
- Doctoral students: Patricia Holmgren
- Author abbrev. (botany): C.L.Hitchc.

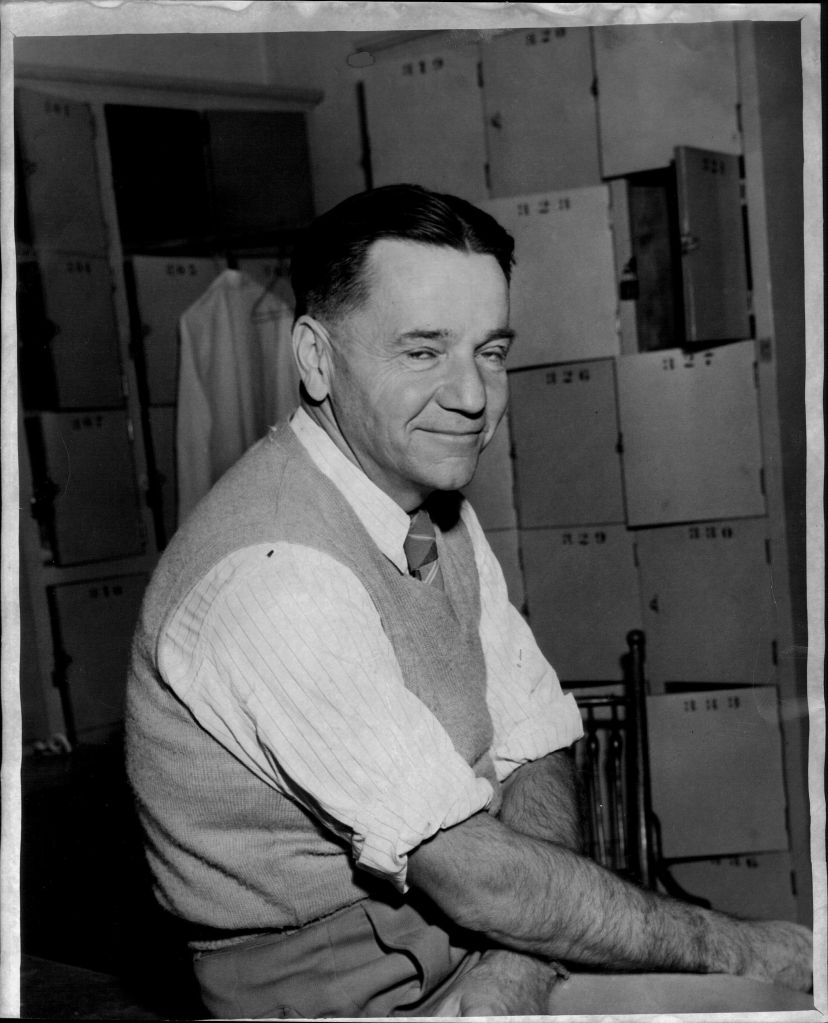
Charles Leo Hitchcock at the University of Washington Herbarium

Charles Leo Hitchcock (April 23, 1902 – February 3, 1986) was an American botanist. He discovered 20 species of plants and his works have been cited thousands of times. He is also the primary co-author to the Flora of the Pacific Northwest, still the most up to date flora for three northwest U.S. States to date. A hall at the University of Washington is named in his honor, and he taught thousands of botanists over the course of his teaching career at the University of Washington.

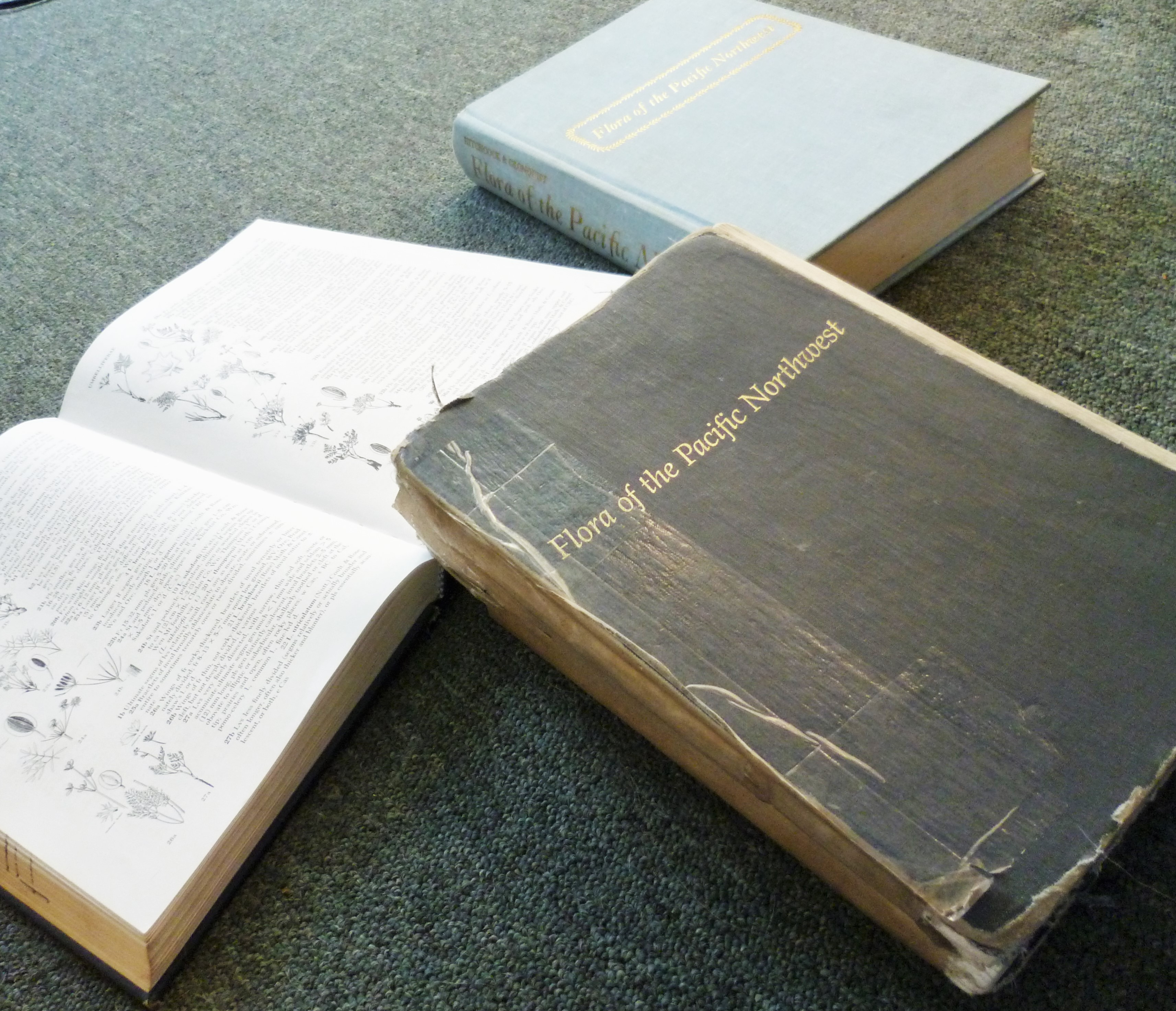
Flora of the Pacific Northwest 1973

== Selected works ==
- A Monographic Study of the Genus Lycium of the Western Hemisphere (1932)
- A Key to the Grasses of Montana Based upon Vegetative Characters (1936)
- The Tofieldia glutinosa Complex of Western North America (1944)
- A Revision of the North American Species of Lathyrus (1952)
- A Checklist of Vascular Plants of West-Central Washington (1969)
- Key to the Grasses of the Pacific Northwest Based upon Vegetative Characters (1969)
- Flora of the Pacific Northwest with Arthur Cronquist (1973)
