= Ibru =

Ibru is a surname. Notable people with the surname include:

- Alex Ibru (1945–2011), Nigerian businessman and politician
- Cecilia Ibru (born 1946), Nigerian banker and fraudster
- Elvina Ibru (born 1972), Nigerian actress
- Emmanuel Ibru, Nigerian businessman and football administrator
- Felix Ibru (1935–2016), Nigerian architect and politician
- Goodie Ibru (born 1942), Nigerian businessman
- Maiden Alex Ibru (born 1949), Nigerian media executive
- Michael Ibru (1930–2016), Nigerian industrialist
- Oskar Ibru (1958–2025), Nigerian businessman and socialite

== Other ==
- Ibru Organization, a Nigerian conglomerate
