= Ibru Organisation =

Conglomerate

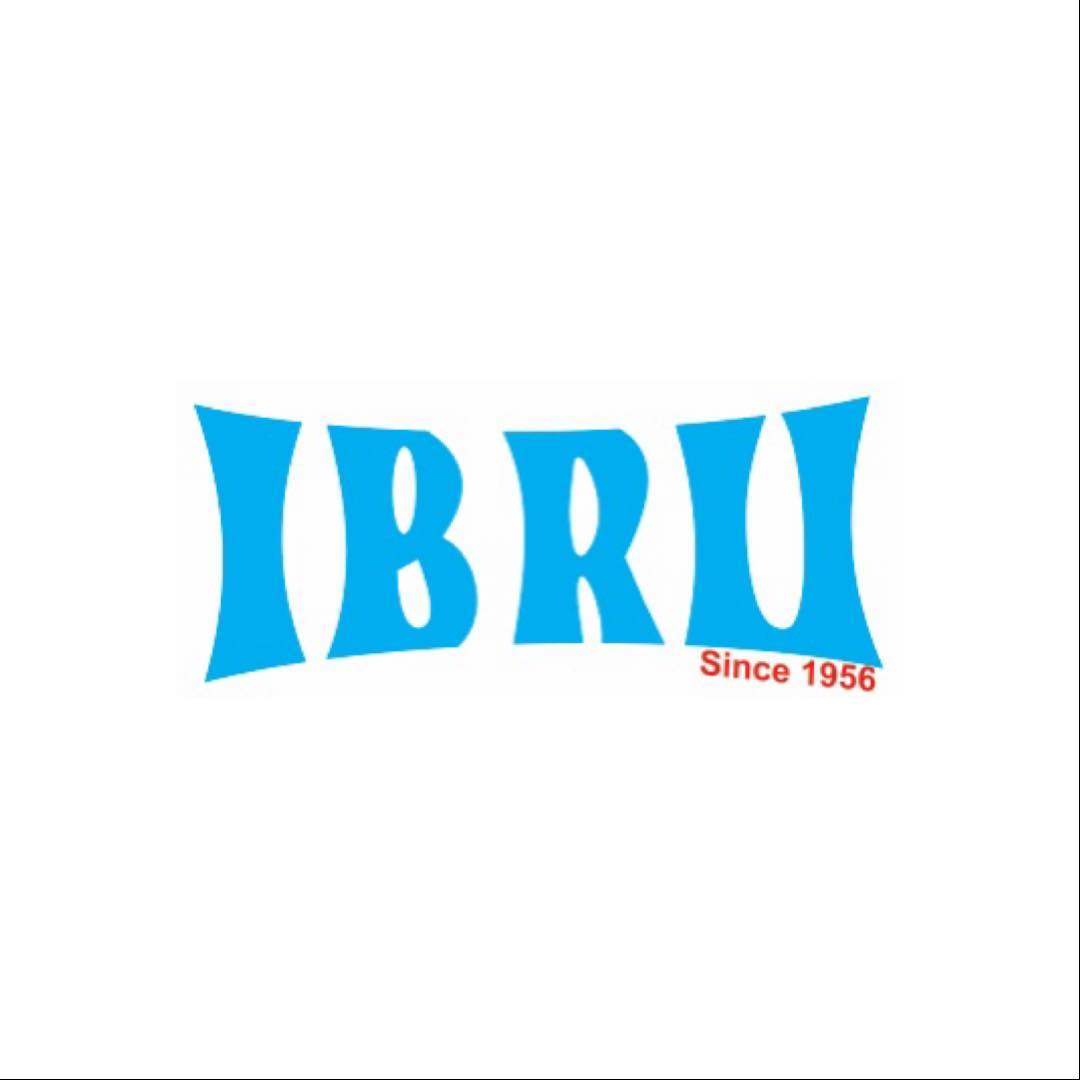
- Formation: 1956
- Type: Conglomerate
- Headquarters: 6, Louis Solomon Close, Victoria Island, Lagos
- Region served: Africa
- Products: Petrol; Airlines; Palm oil; Frozen fish; Newspaper
- Services: Hospitality; Real Estate; Logistics; Education; Warehousing
- Owner: Ibru family
- Key people: Christopher Ibru (Director, Oteri Holdings); Okeore Ibru (Legal counsel, Emsee Shipping); Toke Alex-Ibru (CEO, The Guardian)
- Subsidiaries: Ikeja Hotel Plc; Guardian Nigeria
- Affiliations: Aero Contractors (40%)
- Website: www.ibru.org

The Ibru Organisation is a Nigerian conglomerate headquartered in Lagos. Originally established as a trading company, it expanded into the fishing business and later developed into a diversified group with interests in shipping, oil and gas, real estate, media, agriculture, port management, aviation, banking and hospitality. In 1990, the Ibru Organisation had between 9,000 and 11,000 employees, and by 2009 had grown into a multi-billion dollar conglomerate. Forbes in 2014 listed the Organisation as one of the ten leading family businesses in Africa.

== Origins ==
The Ibru Family are Urhobo people from Agbara-Otor near Ughelli in Delta State. The founder of the firm was Michael Ibru. Michael gained a secondary education at Igbobi College, then worked for the United Africa Company from 1951 until 1956. That year, at the age of 26, he partnered with Jimmy Large, an Englishman, to establish Laibru, a general trading company. He also acquired a stake in Ace Jomona, a construction firm.

== Overview ==
The Ibru Organisation pioneered the distribution of frozen fish in Nigeria, beginning in 1957. At the time, freshwater fishing was a major agricultural activity in Nigeria, but Michael Ibru anticipated that this would change with economic development, opening a market for frozen fish. At first he ran into technical problems with supply and also met consumer resistance. Two joint ventures both failed. He then established Ibru Sea Foods as the sole owner, importing frozen fish and at first trading from the back of his Land Rover truck. He expanded quickly, chartering his first fishing boat in 1963, and in 1965 founding a fishing company with three freezer trawlers as a joint venture with a Japanese firm. Despite setbacks, the fishing fleet had grown to as many as 25 trawlers in the 1970s. Rutam Motors was established and took over management of over 200 transport vehicles acquired from expatriate firms.

The organization continued to grow through acquisitions and joint ventures in diverse businesses including brewing, construction and petroleum distribution, with varying degrees of success. The company also acquired extensive holdings of real estate for agriculture and industrial activity. The recession of the early 1980s caused by falling oil prices, combined with import restrictions, forced contraction and a restructuring at the end of the 1980s. By this time, Michael's eldest son, Olorogun Oskar Ibru had joined the boards of the companies within the organization.

== Companies ==
Firm	Sector
Ikeja Hotel Plc	Hospitality
Oteri Holdings	Real Estate
The Guardian	Media
Ibafon Oil	Oil & Gas
Emsee Shipping	Maritime
Aden River Estates	Agro-allied
Aipec Group	Mining/Energy
Ibru Port Complex, Ibafon, Apapa	Port Management
Aero Contractors	Aviation

== Family ==
The Ibru dynasty is close-knit, with most members involved in the family business. Cecilia Ibru led Oceanic Bank before being indicted and arrested in 2010 in connection with a multi-billion dollar corporate fraud case. She was subsequently convicted and sentenced, with the court ordering forfeiture of cash and assets valued at $1.2B (£786m). Cecilia had started her career at this corporation. She later became involved in the administration of the Michael and Cecilia Ibru University in Delta State.

Talking at Michael Ibru's 80th birthday celebration in January 2011, his eldest son Oskar said "The only thing I can say about my family is that we grew up as a team. We were like a bunch of broom sticks". Michael Ibru helped his brothers with their education, gave them stakes in the Ibru Organisation and helped them to branch out on their own. Alex Ibru, chairman of Rutam Motors, met with newspapermen Stanley Mecebuh of the Daily Times of Nigeria, Patrick Dele-Cole also formerly of that paper and Olusegun Osoba, formerly of the Nigerian Herald. With 55% funding from the Ibru family, they launched The Guardian in 1983, with Alex Ibru as chairman. Alex also served as minister of Internal Affairs from 1993 to 1995. Goodie Ibru, who had qualified as a commercial lawyer, became president of the Nigerian Stock Exchange and chairman of Ikeja Hotel Plc, owners of the Federal Palace Hotel and Sheraton Lagos Hotel. Felix Ibru studied architecture in Israel and, after teaching at Yaba College of Technology, established an architectural firm. He entered politics in 1992 and became the first executive governor of Delta State.

In 1998, Emmanuel Ibru, former board member of the Nigeria Football Federation, founded AS Racine F.C. to promote football development in Nigeria.

Michael Ibru’s first son, Oskar Ibru, took the helm of the multinational organisation in the 1990s and was responsible for steering the wheel until his death in 2025.

Members of the older generation have subsequently stepped aside from leadership positions, making way for younger members of the family, with Toke Alex-Ibru appointed chief executive officer of The Guardian.
