= Oskar Ibru =

Nigerian businessman (1958–2025)

Otunba Olorogun Oskar Ibru
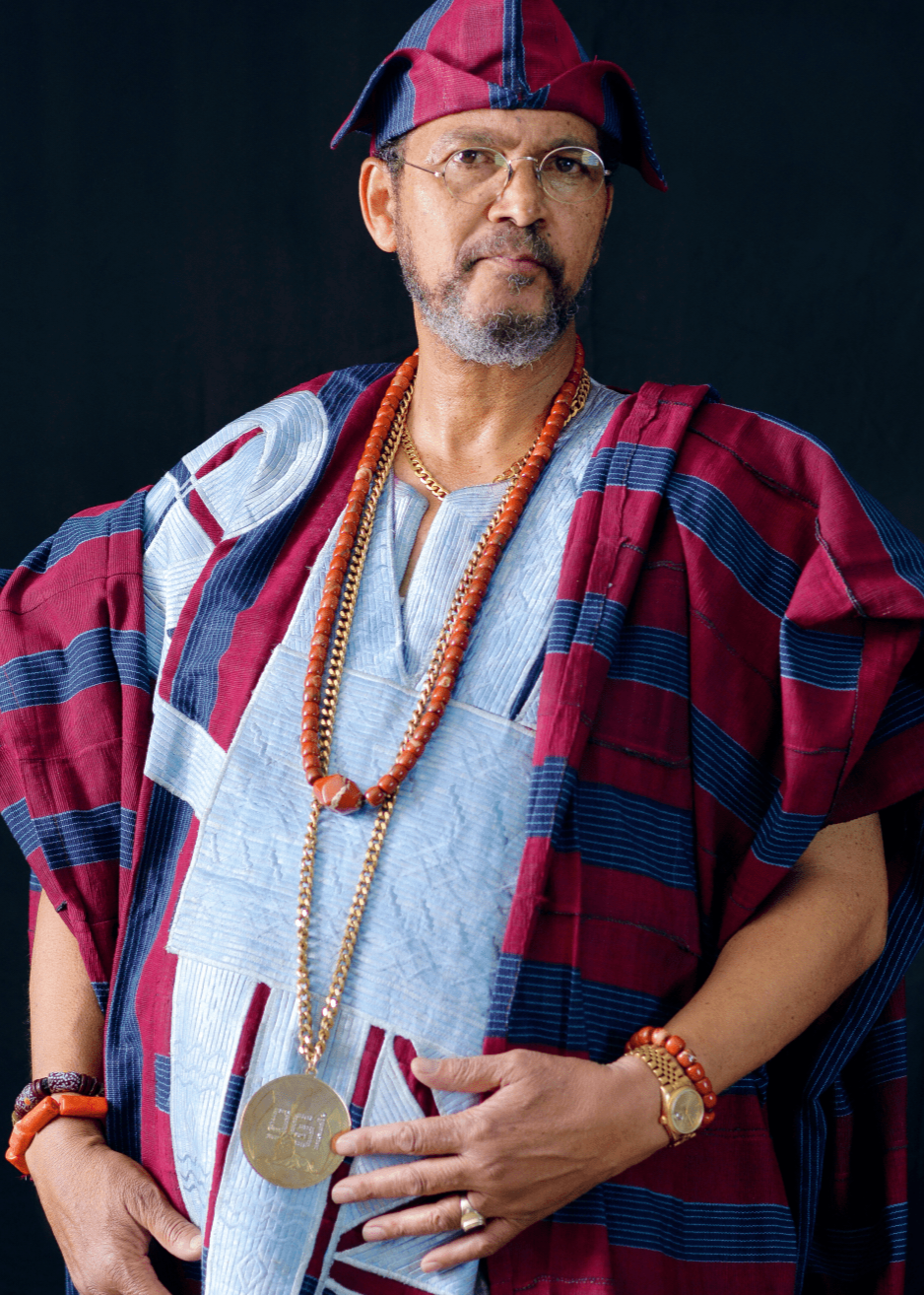
- Born: 11 August 1958 (age 68); Nigeria
- Education: St Andrew's Prep; Igbobi College
- Occupation: Shipping Magnate
- Title: Chairman of Ibru Organisation
- Spouse: Wanda Ibru
- Relatives: Wilbert Tatum (uncle-in-law); Chin Okeke (son-in-law)
- Family: Ibru dynasty

Oskar Eyovbirere Ibru (11 August 1958 – 24 September 2025) was a Nigerian businessman, shipping magnate and philanthropist. He served as chairman and chief executive officer of the Ibru Organisation, one of Africa's leading family-owned business groups, with holdings spanning diverse sectors including aviation, oil and gas, shipping, mining and real estate.

Channel 4 described Ibru as one of Nigeria's richest men, likening him to a Nigerian Aristotle Onassis, with a fortune linked to shipping, oil and gas, and fisheries. He owned the Lansdown Resort in Aburi, Ghana, as well as properties in Nigeria, England, Germany, and the United States. Ibru was an active member of the boating community and was the first African commodore of the Apapa Boat Club. He was also a lover of horse racing and a member of the Royal Enclosure at Ascot.

== Background and education ==
Oskar Eyovbirere Ibru was born into the Ibru family on 11 August 1958, the eldest son of Michael Ibru. Ibru was educated at Corona School, military compound, Yaba, and later at St Andrew's Prep. He attended Igbobi College and Millfield for his secondary education before proceeding to Skidmore College, where he obtained a Bachelor's degree. He subsequently earned an MBA from Atlanta University in 1983.

== Business career ==
Ibru returned to Nigeria in 1983 to join the family business. He began his career at The Guardian as a management trainee before moving into shipping with Emsee Shipping Lines Limited. He rose to become general manager and was appointed managing director of the shipping company in 1992. Over the years, he became a key figure within the Ibru Organisation and went on to head several of its subsidiary companies.

Ibru, his daughter Makashe, and 2Baba during a contract signing at Ibru's office, 2010.

Under Oskar Ibru's leadership, the Ibru Port Complex in Apapa developed into a major importation and storage facility, with vessels berthing to discharge refined petroleum products for storage and onward distribution, making it an important part of Nigeria's downstream sector. The complex hosts a number of petroleum companies, including Eterna Plc, Total Nigeria, Bono Energy, Ibeto Petrochemicals, Ardova Plc, Sahara Energy, Ascon Oil, among others.

Ibru was also active in Nigeria's port and marine sector. From 2006 to 2010, he chaired the governing council of the Nigerian Chamber of Shipping (NCS), the trade body representing the country's shipping and maritime industry, where he advocated for greater indigenous participation in the sector. He was succeeded in the role by Mike Akhigbe, a former Military Vice President.

He served on the board of the Voice of Nigeria, a government-owned international radio station.

== Political activities ==
Ibru was a foundation member of the People's Democratic Party in Delta State and was regarded as a political leader in the state. In 2007, he contested the PDP governorship primary seeking the party's nomination. Following the primary, he supported the party nominee, Emmanuel Uduaghan, who went on to win the general election.

Ibru with President Muhammadu Buhari at the State House, Abuja, 2018.

Although he did not subsequently seek elective office, he was active in the political affairs of Delta State and maintained influence within his constituency in Delta Central. Ibru remained a member of the All Progressives Congress and participated in party activities. In 2025, he hosted an APC unity meeting in Ughelli aimed at strengthening the party in the state.

== Philanthropy ==
Ibru was involved in a range of philanthropic initiatives in the arts, culture, education, and healthcare. He supported scholarship programmes and made contributions to alumni and educational organisations, which included donations to Igbobi College. In 2017, he donated an ICT complex to Igbinedion University in Okada. During the COVID-19 pandemic, he provided food items, relief materials and medical assistance to communities in Delta State and Apapa, including the distribution of malaria treatment kits.

Ibru was chairman of the DreamChild Foundation, an NGO that aims to use the culture of music to empower and support the African child in partnership with the World Bank and KPMG. As head of the foundation, he was involved in efforts aimed at supporting children's healthcare and welfare in Africa. These included donations to Korle-Bu Teaching Hospital and other child-care institutions. He also supported a $14 million fundraising campaign to construct five paediatric clinics across the region. In 2023, the foundation's HoodTalk Music Festival in Ghana was endorsed by president Nana Akufo-Addo following Ibru's meeting with the president at Jubilee House.

The Oskar Ibru Education Foundation was established in his honour to support talented Nigerian children from financially disadvantaged backgrounds through scholarships, mentorship and talent-development programmes.

== Honours and awards ==
Ibru received the Entrepreneurial Excellence Award from Rotary Club in 2002 and was named Maritime Personality of the Year by the Nigerian Chamber of Shipping in 2006. Igbinedion University conferred an honorary doctorate on Ibru in 2017 in recognition of his contribution to the education sector. In 2019, he received the Africa Travel Global Personalities Award in the hospitality category, alongside Egyptian businessman Samih Sawiris and Ethiopian investor Tadiwos Belete, founder of Kuriftu Resorts. Marine Road in Apapa was renamed Oskar Ibru Way after him.

== Chieftaincy titles ==
Ibru, a traditional aristocrat, held a number of titles, including the Ochuko R'Ovie of Agbara-Otor, the Odomese of Olomu Kingdom, the Oga ndi’oga of Arondizuogu, the Otunba Boyejo of Ijebu Kingdom and the Seriki Majidi of Accra, Ghana. He bore the tribal honourific Olorogun, a title also borne by members of his family.

== Memberships ==
He was a member of the Lagos Polo Club, the Metropolitan Club, the Ikoyi Club, the Lagos Motor Boat Club, and the Apapa Club.

== Personal life ==
Ibru was married to Chief Wanda Ibru, a niece of the legendary publisher Wilbert Tatum. She is the curator of the Ijebu National Museum and owner of the Pathways Botanical Garden in Delta State. They had three children: Makashe Ibru, Chris Ebruba Ibru and Nenesi Ibru.

== Death ==
Ibru died after a brief illness on 24 September 2025, at the age of 67. His death was announced on the floor of the House by deputy speaker Benjamin Kalu.
