= Peter Odemwingie =

Nigerian footballer (born 1981)

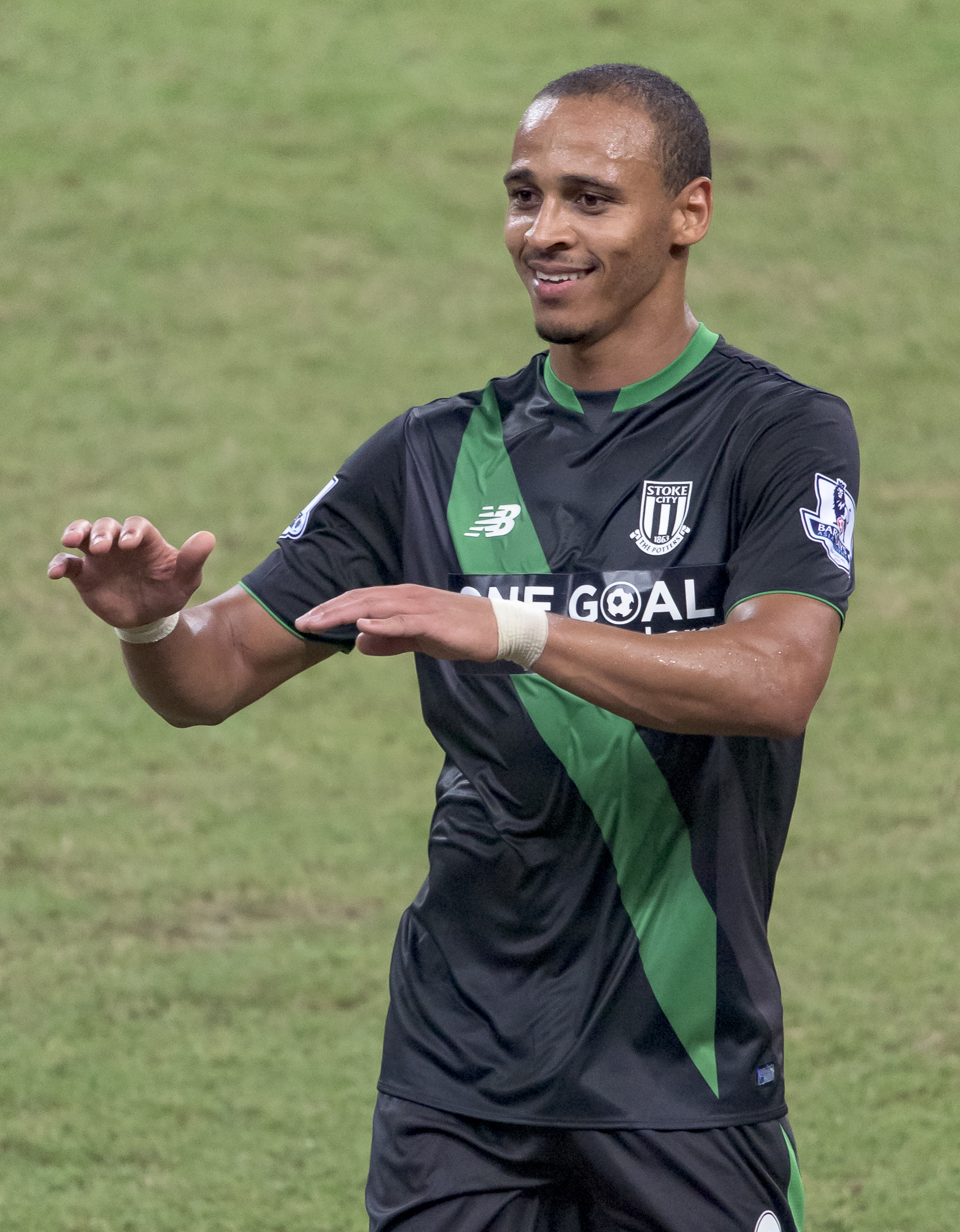
- Odemwingie playing for Stoke City in 2015

Personal information
- Full name: Peter Osaze Odemwingie
- Date of birth: 15 July 1981 (age 45)
- Place of birth: Tashkent, Uzbek SSR, Soviet Union (now Uzbekistan)
- Height: 1.82 m (6 ft 0 in)
- Position: Forward

Youth career
- 1994: KAMAZ
- 1995–1998: CSKA Moscow
- 1999: AS Racine F.C.

Senior career*
Years	Team	Apps	(Gls)
2000–2002	Bendel Insurance	53	(19)
2002–2004	La Louvière	44	(9)
2004–2007	Lille	75	(23)
2007–2010	Lokomotiv Moscow	75	(21)
2010–2013	West Bromwich Albion	87	(30)
2013–2014	Cardiff City	15	(1)
2014–2016	Stoke City	27	(5)
2016	→ Bristol City (loan)	7	(2)
2016–2017	Rotherham United	7	(0)
2017–2018	Madura United	23	(15)
Total		413	(125)

International career
2008	Nigeria Olympic (O.P.)	6	(1)
2002–2014	Nigeria	65	(11)
- * Club domestic league appearances and goals

Peter Osaze Odemwingie (born 15 July 1981) is a former professional footballer who played as a forward.

Born in what is now Uzbekistan, Odemwingie began his career with Bendel Insurance in the Nigeria Premier League. He then earned a move to European football with Belgian side La Louvière where he spent three seasons winning the Belgian Cup before moving to French side Lille. Odemwingie scored 26 goals for Lille while also playing in the UEFA Champions League with the side. Lokomotiv Moscow bought him for £10 million in July 2007. He scored 23 times in 3 1/2 years for Lokomotiv.

He joined English side West Bromwich Albion in August 2010. He scored 30 Premier League goals for the Baggies, which won him three Premier League Player of the Month awards. A failed move to Queens Park Rangers saw him fall out of favour with manager Steve Clarke and he was sold to Cardiff City in August 2013 for a fee of £2.25 million. He spent six months at Cardiff before joining Stoke City in a player-exchange with Kenwyne Jones in January 2014.

Odemwingie made his debut for the Nigeria national team in a friendly against Kenya in May 2002 and has represented the country over 60 times, including at two World Cups and four Africa Cup of Nations, as well as winning silver at the 2008 Olympics.

== Club career ==
=== Early career ===
Odemwingie was born in Tashkent in the former Soviet Union to a Nigerian father (Peter Odemwingie Sr.) and a Russian Tatar mother (Raisa), both of whom were medical students. He moved with his family to Nigeria when he was two years old before completing his secondary education in Russia. Whilst living in Russia, he played in the youth teams of KAMAZ and CSKA Moscow. At the age of 17 he moved back to Nigeria and after spending a short time with AS Racines of Lagos he became a professional with Nigeria Premier League side Bendel Insurance, where he scored 19 goals in 53 league appearances from 2000 to 2002. He was scouted by Emmanuel Ibru, Chairman of AS Racine F.C. The club serves as a feeder team to many local and foreign clubs.

=== La Louvière ===
Odemwingie had an unsuccessful trial with Anderlecht before he signed for La Louvière in 2002 and made his mark by helping the club to win the Belgian Cup in his first season. This earned La Louvière qualification into the UEFA Cup where they played Portuguese side Benfica, Odemwingie scoring in a 1–1 draw. He had a trial with Blackburn Rovers in August 2004.

=== Lille ===
Scoring nine goals in 44 appearances attracted the attention of Ligue 1 side Lille and before long he was a starter in the first team. Famous for his technique and pace, the Nigerian player was being monitored by a number of prestigious European clubs. Odemwingie indicated that he wanted to stay at Lille and help them fight for the league the following season and scored five league goals for them in the 2006–07 season as well as one against A.C. Milan at the San Siro to take Lille to the UEFA Champions League knockout stages.

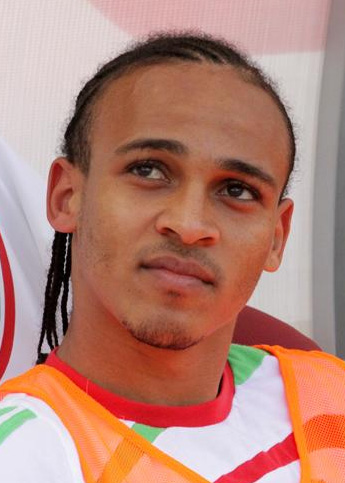
Odemwingie with Lokomotiv Moscow in 2010

=== Lokomotiv Moscow ===
On 16 July 2007, he signed for Lokomotiv Moscow for a reported fee of US$14 million on a four-year contract. In three seasons for Lokomotiv, Odemwingie became the driving force of the attack and one of their most important players. During his time at Lokomotiv Stadium, Odemwingie managed 21 goals in the Russian Premier League from 75 games.

=== West Bromwich Albion ===
==== 2010–11 ====
On 20 August 2010 Odemwingie signed for Premier League club West Bromwich Albion for an undisclosed fee on a two-year contract, with the option of a third year in the club's favour. A day later, he scored the 81st-minute winning goal on his Premier League debut, a 1–0 win against Sunderland. Shortly after signing for West Bromwich Albion, photographs showed Lokomotiv Moscow fans celebrating the sale of Odemwingie through the use of racist banners targeted at the player. One banner included the image of a banana and read "Thanks West Brom". Before West Brom's game against Tottenham Hotspur in September 2010, it was announced that West Brom fans would unfurl a banner to counter the racist one, the banner read 'Thanks Lokomotiv' and is accompanied by a picture of Odemwingie celebrating his winner on his debut against Sunderland. Odemwingie scored again for West Brom as they defeated Arsenal 3–2 at the Emirates Stadium on 25 September 2010. Odemwingie scored a brace for West Brom on 5 December 2010, as they defeated fellow promoted side Newcastle United 3–1 at the Hawthorns.

Odemwingie scored the second goal for West Brom which brought his season tally in the Premier League to 10 goals, only two behind Robert Earnshaw's Premier League record for the club. 9 April saw West Brom travel to the Stadium of Light to play Sunderland. Odemwingie continued to impress and scored a goal in the 29th minute to level the scores. His side eventually won 3–2, three points significantly helping his side's survival hopes. After the game, he announced his desire to keep on playing well for West Brom by aiming to score 15 league goals. On 16 April Odemwingie edged closer to this personal target when he became West Brom's joint top goalscorer ever in a single season in the Premier League with a goal against Chelsea, bringing his tally to 12. Because of his continued success in his debut season in England, Odemwingie was reportedly targeted by a number of big clubs, including Italian giants Juventus, but Odemwingie dispelled talk of a move, stating that he's happy at West Brom.

Odemwingie continued his fine form, scoring a lovely curling effort with his left foot in the fifth minute against Tottenham Hotspur. This brought him on to 13 league goals for the season, and meant that he had scored four in his last five games. On 30 April, Odemwingie became the first player in West Brom's Premier League history to score in four consecutive games. This goal came against Aston Villa and meant he had scored 15 goals thus far in his debut season. It would also contribute to Odemwingie's second Premier League Player of the Month award of the season. His side faced Everton at the Hawthorns on 14 May and Odemwingie provided an assist for Youssuf Mulumbu to score the only goal of the game. The result put West Brom on 46 points, bolstering their chances of finishing as the Midlands' highest placed club in the Premier League. Odemwingie ended the 2010–11 Season as West Bromwich Albion's top goal scorer with 15 league goals.

==== 2011–12 ====
On 18 August it was announced that Odemwingie had signed a new three-year agreement with West Bromwich Albion, after a £4,000,000 bid from Wigan Athletic was turned down by the club. After some injury setbacks, he scored his first goal of the 2011–12 season away to Norwich City, pouncing on confusion between Richie De Laet and Declan Rudd. Odemwingie's second goal of the season came in the Black Country derby, where West Bromwich Albion defeated Wolverhampton Wanderers 2–0. Odemwingie scored a spectacular goal against Blackburn Rovers on 17 December, putting West Brom into a late lead after James Morrison had scored a stunning volley earlier in the half.

The result put West Brom up to 13th in the table heading into the busy Christmas period and gave Odemwingie his third league goal of the season. Odemwingie opened the scoring in the twentieth minute of the Baggies next fixture at Newcastle United, a 3–2 victory, on Tuesday 21 December. The result extended Newcastle's winless run in the Premier League to 6 games, put West Brom up to 10 and sealed their first victory at Newcastle in the league since 1977. On 12 February, Odemwingie scored his first Premier League hat-trick for the club in a 5–1 victory over Black Country rival Wolverhampton Wanderers. On 25 February he scored 2 goals in a 4–0 win against Sunderland. His performances in the month of February led him to be named the Premier League Player of the Month for the third time in his career.

==== 2012–13 ====
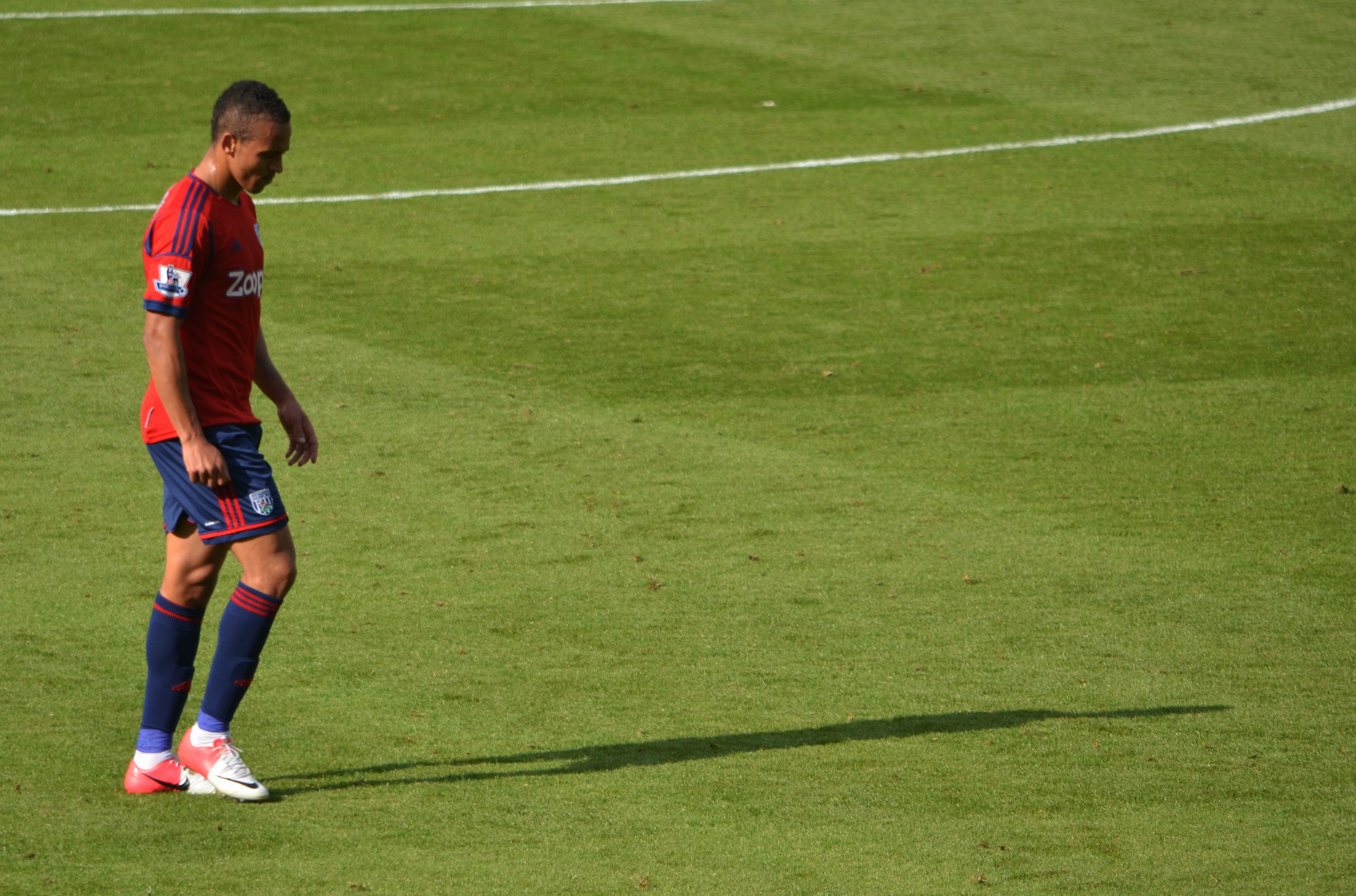
Odemwingie walking off the pitch after getting sent off against Fulham

Odemwingie started off the new Premier League season well, converting a penalty in a 3–0 victory over Liverpool on 18 August 2012. During West Brom's game on 15 September against Fulham, Odemwingie kicked out at Sascha Riether and was penalised with a red card; West Brom went on to lose the game 3–0, their first defeat of the season. On 5 November 2012, Odemwingie scored a brace against Southampton, his second of the season coming from a shot that deflected off Maya Yoshida past Paulo Gazzaniga and his third a headed goal from a Shane Long cross.

Odemwingie headed in the winner against Chelsea on 17 November, pushing West Brom to a 2–1 home victory, their sixth win from seven home games to start the season. Later in the season Odemwingie scored against Aston Villa to make it 2–2 in the 83rd minute after West Brom had been 2 goals down at half-time in an enthralling match. On 25 January 2013, West Brom announced they had rejected a formal transfer request from Odemwingie.

Odemwingie's future at West Bromwich Albion came under doubt when he launched a tirade against his club on Twitter, in addition to accusing them of "reaching into his pocket", reiterating his wish for a move elsewhere. On 31 January 2013, he was seen on Sky Sports News during the final day of the transfer window parked outside of Loftus Road in an attempt to sign for Queens Park Rangers, but was refused entry as no offer was accepted for him. He was widely criticised for his actions, with Albion chairman Jeremy Peace saying he acted "unprofessionally", and that he was obligated to see out the rest of his contract. Both QPR manager Harry Redknapp and representatives from West Brom stated in the aftermath that Redknapp had been in contact with West Brom to finalise a move and that Odemwingie had arrived at the stadium under the impression a deal had been reached for his sale, however, talks fell through and no agreement was reached. After initially being sent home from training on his return to West Brom, Odemwingie was later disciplined by the club for his actions on transfer deadline day and resumed training, while also publicly apologizing for his behaviour. He returned to the side against Sunderland on 23 February 2013 coming on as a substitute in the final few minutes and was jeered by some Albion supporters. Steve Clarke continued to use Odemwingie as a substitute which caused him to again attack the club on Twitter. At the end of the season Steve Clarke stated that he expected Odemwingie to leave West Brom in August 2013. Odemwingie's 30 Premier League goals for Albion make him the club's top scorer in the competition.

=== Cardiff City ===
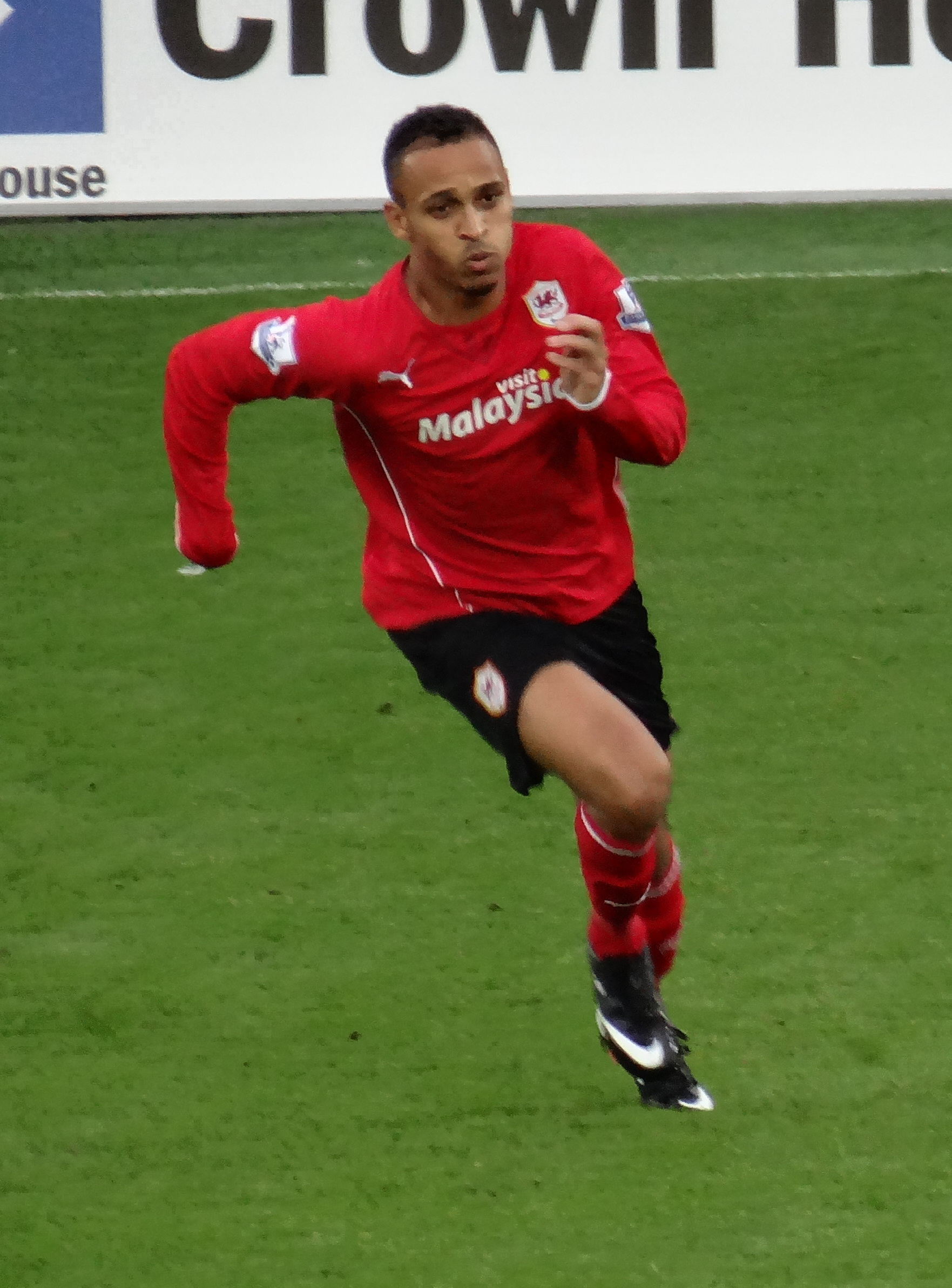
Odemwingie playing for Cardiff City

On 2 September 2013, Odemwingie signed a two-year contract with Cardiff City for £2.25 million. Speaking after the move Odemwingie stated that he was eager for a fresh start in his career. He made his debut on 22 September 2013 in a 1–0 defeat against Tottenham Hotspur. He scored his first goal for the club two days later in a 3–2 defeat against West Ham United in the League Cup. He also scored in a 2–1 loss against Newcastle United on 5 October 2013. He developed a good relationship with manager Malky Mackay who stated that Odemwingie "is a joy to work with". However Mackay was replaced with Ole Gunnar Solskjær in January 2014 and Odemwingie fell out of favour.

=== Stoke City ===
On 28 January 2014, Odemwingie joined Stoke City on an 18-month contract in a player-exchange with Kenwyne Jones. Odemwingie described his move to Stoke as a "step forward". He made his debut the next day in a 1–0 defeat away at Sunderland. He scored his first goal for Stoke on 8 February 2014 in a 2–2 draw against Southampton. Odemwingie scored in a 3–1 win over West Ham United on 15 March 2014. He followed this up with goals against Aston Villa and Hull City. He ended 2013–14 with five goals in 15 appearances for the Potters which earned him a place in Nigeria's 30-man provisional squad for the 2014 FIFA World Cup.

Odemwingie suffered a knee ligament injury in a 1–0 win at Manchester City on 30 August 2014, ruling him out for most of the 2014–15 season. Odemwingie returned to full training in April 2015. He made his return from injury on 25 April 2015 in a 1–1 draw with Sunderland. Odemwingie only managed eight appearances in an injury hit 2014–15 campaign as Stoke again finished in 9th position. On 2 July 2015 Odemwingie signed a new one-year contract with Stoke City.

After struggling for playing time with Stoke in 2015–16, Odemwingie joined Championship side Bristol City on loan in March 2016. He played seven times for the Robins scoring twice against Bolton Wanderers and Rotherham United. He was released by Stoke at the end of the 2015–16 season.

Following his release from Stoke, Odemwingie had a trial with Hull City in July 2016.

=== Rotherham United ===
On 24 October 2016, Odemwingie signed a short-term contract until 25 January 2017 with Rotherham United, becoming Kenny Jackett's first signing for the club. On 29 October, Odemwingie made his debut for Rotherham, coming on as a substitute, replacing Jon Taylor in the 80th minute, in a 2–2 draw against Ipswich Town. Odemwingie was given a straight red card for a forearm smash in Kenny Jackett's final match as Rotherham manager on 26 November in a 2–1 defeat against Leeds United. Odemwingie left Rotherham United at the end of his short-term contract, informing his manager via text message that he would not be staying at the club.

=== Madura United ===
On 3 April 2017, Odemwingie joined Indonesian Liga 1 side Madura United as a marquee player. He scored on his league debut, successfully netting a penalty in a 2–0 triumph against Bali United on 16 April. He created his first hat-trick against Semen Padang on 12 April 2017.

Odemwingie announced his retirement on 3 April 2019.

== International career ==
Odemwingie chose to represent Nigeria where his father was born. His first match came as a substitute in a 3–0 victory over Kenya on 4 May 2002. He scored his first goal in the 2004 Nations cup qualifying match against Angola. In the finals he scored in the 80th and 82nd minute of a 4-0 win over South Africa, as well as scoring in the 52nd minute of the 3rd place play-off to put Nigeria 2-0 up in an eventual 2-1 win over Mali. At the 2006 Africa Cup of Nations, he played in the semi-final as the Super Eagles lost to Ivory Coast 1–0. He was also included to play for Nigeria in the 2008 Africa Cup of Nations.

In 2008, Odemwingie was selected as an over-age player for the Super Eagles' Olympic squad, scoring in the quarter-final against Ivory Coast as the team earned the silver medal after losing the final to defending champions Argentina.

He captained the team for the 2010 Africa Cup of Nations, and when Nigeria bowed out of the competition at the semi-final stage, Odemwingie controversially openly criticised coach Shaibu Amodu's tactics, blaming them for the defeat. He was chosen as part of the Best XI of the tournament.

Odemwingie was selected for the Nigeria squad for the 2010 FIFA World Cup, appearing against Argentina and Greece in the Super Eagles' group stage exit. After the team's elimination, Odemwingie, who was omitted from the team for the final match against South Korea, publicly criticised coach Lars Lagerbäck.

Odemwingie was involved in a dispute with Nigeria's coach Stephen Keshi after being omitted from the squad for 2013 Africa Cup of Nations but was named in Nigeria's 30-man provisional squad for the 2014 FIFA World Cup on 12 May 2014, despite not representing the team for over year. In June 2014, he made the cut for the final 23-man squad.

After appearing as a substitute in the team's opening match against Iran, he was named in the starting line-up for the second group fixture against Bosnia and Herzegovina on 21 June. In scoring the only goal of the match, Odemwingie gave the Super Eagles their first win at the FIFA World Cup since the 1998 edition.

== Personal life ==
Originally from Benin City, Odemwingie was born to a Nigerian father and a Tatar mother. His middle name, Osaze, in the Edo language means "God chooses (for you)". Odemwingie married his fiancée, Sarah Fallon, on 26 May 2012 at a church in Northampton after two years of dating.

Since his retirement from professional football, Odemwingie has qualified as a PGA professional golfer.

== Career statistics ==
=== Club ===
Appearances and goals by club, season and competition
Club	Season	League			National cup		League cup		Europe		Total	
Club	Season	Division	Apps	Goals	Apps	Goals	Apps	Goals	Apps	Goals	Apps	Goals
Bendel Insurance	2000	Nigeria Premier League	18	3	0	0	—		—		18	3
Bendel Insurance	2001	Nigeria Premier League	17	7	0	0	—		—		17	7
Bendel Insurance	2002	Nigeria Premier League	18	9	0	0	—		—		18	9
Bendel Insurance	Total		53	19	0	0	0	0	0	0	53	19
La Louvière	2002–03	Belgian First Division	14	2	0	0	—		0	0	14	2
La Louvière	2003–04	Belgian First Division	27	5	0	0	—		2	1	29	6
La Louvière	2004–05	Belgian First Division	3	2	0	0	—		0	0	3	2
La Louvière	Total		44	9	0	0	0	0	2	1	46	10
Lille	2004–05	Ligue 1	20	4	0	0	2	0	4	0	26	4
Lille	2005–06	Ligue 1	26	14	0	0	0	0	8	1	34	15
Lille	2006–07	Ligue 1	29	5	2	0	0	0	9	2	40	7
Lille	Total		75	23	2	0	2	0	21	3	100	26
Lokomotiv Moscow	2007	Russian Premier League	14	4	0	0	—		5	2	19	6
Lokomotiv Moscow	2008	Russian Premier League	26	10	0	0	—		0	0	26	10
Lokomotiv Moscow	2009	Russian Premier League	25	7	0	0	—		0	0	25	7
Lokomotiv Moscow	2010	Russian Premier League	10	0	0	0	—		0	0	10	0
Lokomotiv Moscow	Total		75	21	0	0	—		5	2	80	23
West Bromwich Albion	2010–11	Premier League	32	15	0	0	0	0	—		32	15
West Bromwich Albion	2011–12	Premier League	30	10	1	1	1	0	—		32	11
West Bromwich Albion	2012–13	Premier League	25	5	1	0	0	0	—		26	5
West Bromwich Albion	Total		87	30	2	1	1	0	0	0	90	31
Cardiff City	2013–14	Premier League	15	1	0	0	1	1	—		16	2
Stoke City	2013–14	Premier League	15	5	0	0	0	0	—		15	5
Stoke City	2014–15	Premier League	7	0	0	0	1	0	—		8	0
Stoke City	2015–16	Premier League	5	0	1	0	2	0	—		8	0
Stoke City	Total		27	5	1	0	3	0	0	0	31	5
Bristol City (loan)	2015–16	Championship	7	2	0	0	0	0	—		7	2
Rotherham United	2016–17	Championship	7	0	0	0	0	0	—		7	0
Madura United	2017	Liga 1	23	15	—		—		—		23	15
Career total			413	125	5	1	7	1	28	6	453	133

=== International ===
Appearances and goals by national team and year
National team	Year	Apps	Goals
Nigeria	2002	1	0
Nigeria	2003	1	1
Nigeria	2004	8	3
Nigeria	2005	3	1
Nigeria	2006	3	0
Nigeria	2007	8	0
Nigeria	2008	10	1
Nigeria	2009	9	1
Nigeria	2010	11	3
Nigeria	2011	3	0
Nigeria	2012	1	0
Nigeria	2013	0	0
Nigeria	2014	7	1
Total		65	11

Scores and results list Nigeria's goal tally first, score column indicates score after each Odemwingie goal.

List of international goals scored by Peter Odemwingie
No.	Date	Venue	Opponent	Score	Result	Competition	Ref.
1	21 June 2003	Samuel Ogbemudia Stadium, Benin City, Nigeria	Angola	2–2	2–2	2004 African Cup of Nations qualification	
2	31 April 2004	Mustapha Ben Jannet Stadium, Monastir, Tunisia	South Africa	3–0	4–0	2004 African Cup of Nations	
3	31 April 2004	Mustapha Ben Jannet Stadium, Monastir, Tunisia	South Africa	4–0	4–0	2004 African Cup of Nations	
4	13 February 2004	Mustapha Ben Jannet Stadium, Monastir, Tunisia	Mali	2–0	2–1	2004 African cup of Nations	
5	8 October 2005	Moshood Abiola National Stadium, Abuja, Nigeria	Zimbabwe	5–1	5–1	2006 FIFA World Cup qualification	
6	11 October 2008	Moshood Abiola National Stadium, Abuja, Nigeria	Sierra Leone	3–1	4–1	2010 FIFA World Cup qualification	
7	6 September 2009	Moshood Abiola National Stadium, Abuja, Nigeria	Tunisia	1–0	2–2	2010 FIFA World Cup qualification	
8	20 January 2010	Estádio Nacional da Tundavala, Lubango, Angola	Mozambique	1–0	3–0	2010 African Cup of Nations	
9	20 January 2010	Estádio Nacional da Tundavala, Lubango, Angola	Mozambique	2–0	3–0	2010 African Cup of Nations	
10	11 August 2010	Suwon World Cup Stadium, Suwon, South Korea	South Korea	1–1	1–2	Friendly	
11	21 June 2014	Arena Pantanal, Cuiabá, Brazil	Bosnia and Herzegovina	1–0	1–0	2014 FIFA World Cup	

== Honours ==
La Louvière

- Belgian Cup: 2002–03

Nigeria

- Summer Olympics silver medal: 2008
- Africa Cup of Nations third place: 2004, 2006, 2010

Individual

- Africa Cup of Nations Best XI: 2010
- Premier League Player of the Month: September 2010, April 2011, February 2012
