= Okolie =

Okolie is a Nigerian surname that may refer to the following people:

- Chidera Okolie (born 1993), Nigerian writer
- Chris Okolie (died 2007), Nigerian concert promoter and publisher
- Karin Okolie (born 1994), Bulgarian sprinter
- Kenneth Okolie (born 1984), Nigerian actor and model
- Lawrence Okolie (born 1992), British boxer
- Odafa Onyeka Okolie (born 1985), Nigerian football player

== See also ==
- Okolie language
