= Michael Ibru =

Nigerian industrialist

Olorogun Michael Ibru OFR
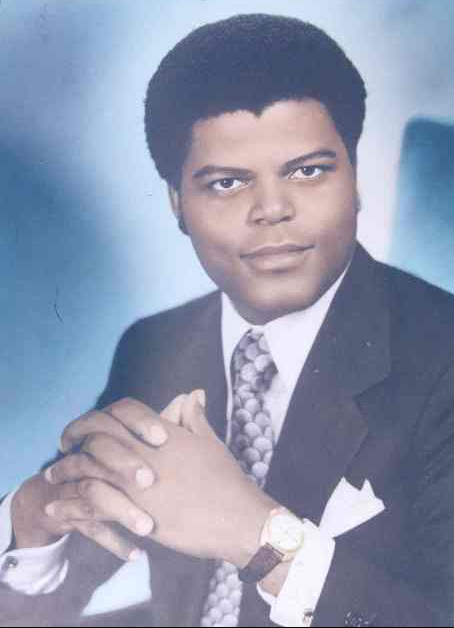
- Born: Michael Christopher Onajirevbe Ibru; 25 December 1930; British Nigeria
- Died: 6 September 2016 (aged 85); Upper Marlboro, Maryland, U.S.
- Education: Igbobi College
- Occupation: industrialist philanthropist
- Years active: 1951—1990s
- Known for: Founding and leading the Ibru Organisation; Introducing frozen fish to West Africa
- Children: Oskar Ibru; Elvina Ibru; Emmanuel Ibru
- Relatives: Chris Okolie (brother-in-law)
- Family: Ibru dynasty

Chief Michael Onajirevbe Ibru OFR (25 December 1930 – 6 September 2016) was a pioneering Nigerian industrialist and patriarch of the Ibru dynasty who founded the Ibru Organisation, one of Africa's leading indigenous conglomerates. He was one of the eminent entrepreneurs who shaped modern Nigerian enterprise during the pre- and early-independence periods, when much of the economy was controlled by foreign-owned interests. Forbes described him as a "Titan of Industry" and one of the continent's most revered business leaders.

In the early years of post-independence Nigeria, Michael Ibru, through the Ibru Organisation, provided one of the clearest demonstrations that Nigerian-owned capital could build and compete on a large scale with established foreign commercial interests that had been operating in Nigeria since the colonial era. Ibru diversified the Organisation across multiple sectors, building one of Nigeria's earliest indigenous multinational conglomerates, with interests extending well beyond its original fishing and trading operations.

In his study The Advance of African Capital: The Growth of Nigerian Private Enterprise, British political scientist and scholar Tom G. Forrest identified the Ibru Organisation as one of Africa's largest businesses, examining its emergence as a major indigenous corporate group and its evolution from a pioneering frozen fish trading enterprise into a highly diversified conglomerate.

== Background ==
Ibru was born in Warri to the family of Chief Peter Epete Ibru and Janet Ibru. His maternal family included a number of wealthy traders and royals; among them was Chief Osadjere of Olomu Kingdom, a prominent 19th century merchant. His son, Ovedje Osadjere, expanded his father’s commerce during the beginning decades of British colonial rule in Urhoboland in the 20th century. Michael grew up under Ovedje's influence. Ibru attended Igbobi College where he was captain of Townsend house and Senior Prefect. He acquired a school certificate in 1951.

== Career ==
=== Early career ===
After secondary school, Michael joined the United African Company as a management trainee. In 1956, a few years after joining U.A.C., he resigned from the company and started a partnership, which he called Laibru. The corporate entity was in partnership with an English expatriate, Jimmy Large. Ibru ventured into construction after acquiring interest in Associated Construction & Engineering, known as Ace Jomona. The firm was involved in the construction of buildings at several notable institutions, including Queen's College, Lagos; St Gregory's College, Lagos; Police College, Ikeja; and the Navy Barracks, Apapa. However, the frustrations of lengthy contract processes and delayed payments for completed projects eventually made Ibru to rethink his business strategy.

=== Frozen fish trade ===
With a loan from the African Continental Bank, Michael Ibru established Ibru Sea Foods in 1957, pioneering Nigeria's frozen fish industry, which was initially met with resistance from the public. He embarked on a nationwide advertising campaign to popularize the product, using catchy slogans such as "Sokoyokoto, Eja Ibru", while teaching the people how to smoke frozen fish. By the mid-1960s, Ibru had become a millionaire from fish trading, and controlled about 60% of the frozen fish market by the 1970s, with turnover hitting over ₦90 million (approximately US$136 million), equivalent to $1.023 billion in 2026 dollars.

=== Fishing venture ===
In 1963, Chief Ibru chartered his first fishing vessel from Taiyo Gyogo of Japan, and two years later, in partnership with the Japanese conglomerate, he founded the Osadjere Fishing Company, one of the largest fishing companies in Africa. With Mr. Gyogo holding 30 percent of the equity and providing management for its deep-sea fishing trawlers and shrimpers, the company began operations with three long-distance freezer trawlers, and grew to over 25 trawlers in the 1970s. Ibru secured fishing rights in Angola, Namibia and Mauritania and began exporting tiger prawns and shrimps while simultaneously importing frozen fish from Russia and the Netherlands.

=== Diversification ===
By the late 1960s, Ibru had branched out into other areas of the economy. In 1968, he founded Emsee Shipping Lines, a maritime subsidiary of the conglomerate. He also founded Rutam Motors, a transportation arm of his business that dealt in the marketing and distribution of Mazda, Saviem, Tata, and Jeep brands of automobiles. Later, the federal government appointed Rutam the major distributor of Peugeot vehicles in Nigeria. In 1969, Ibru established Aden River Estates, a large palm oil plantation that also included citrus and pineapple, on 800 hectares of land in the old Bendel State. He later acquired Mitchell Farm in 1973 from its American owners, Alizar, who had established it a decade earlier. The farm grew to become the largest supplier of day-old chicks and processed poultry in West Africa. In the same year, a private port complex was developed at Ibafon, west of Tin Can Island, at a cost of ₦100 million (approximately US$152 million), equivalent to $1.14 billion in 2026 dollars. The facility was financed in part by Emborg of Denmark.

=== Expansion ===
In 1974, another business enterprise, Nigeria Hardwood Company Ltd, a logging, sawmilling, and wood processing company, was acquired. The company, owned by the Lathem Group, UK, was originally established in 1919 and exported logs of hard wood. In 1975, he established Minet Nigeria, the insurance arm of the Group, with technical support from Minet Group of London, which was acquired in 1997 by AON Plc. Ibru built a private Airstrip in 1972, took a 40% stake in Aero Contractors in 1973 and increased his stake to 60% in 1976. He acquired an interest in Western Bottlers, a Pepsi-Cola bottler, and subsequently established Rainbow Nigeria Limited, with operations in Sapele and Aba. Rainbow held the Pepsi-Cola franchise for the eastern states of Nigeria, manufactured Pepsi and Mirinda, and was later sold to Nigerian Bottling Company. Superbru Brewery, whose products included Skol Lager Beer, was established in Agbara-Otor in 1979 in partnership with Allied Breweries. In 1981, the Ibru Organisation's turnover was estimated to be about ₦250 million (approximately US$410 million), equivalent to US$1.5 billion in 2026 dollars. Over the following decades, the conglomerate diversified into other areas, including banking, hospitality, oil and gas, publishing and port management. By 1990, it had between 9,000 and 11,000 employees and had grown into a multi-billion dollar conglomerate by the early 2000s. The Organisation was ranked by Forbes as one of Africa's leading family-owned businesses in 2014.

== Recognition ==
He was awarded honorary Doctor of Laws degrees (Hon. LL.D.) by the University of Ibadan and the University of Benin in 1978 and was conferred the national honour of Officer of the Federal Republic (OFR) in 1981.

Ibru was named the Outstanding Businessman of the Year by the Nigerian-American Chamber of Commerce in 1983. He was also a member of the African Development Bank President's Roundtable of Businessmen and was appointed to the Business Advisory Council of the International Finance Corporation in 1989.

== Philanthropy ==
Michael Ibru was also known for his philanthropy, particularly in education and community development. He provided scholarships to Nigerian students at home and abroad and supported numerous schools with classroom blocks, educational materials and financial assistance. He donated Abraham College in Agbara-Otor to the community, which was later renamed Ibru College. He was also involved in the foundation and early development of the University of Benin, serving on its Provisional Council in 1975.

At the foundation-laying ceremony of Bendel State University in March 1982, Ibru made a donation to the university's endowment fund. He also supported sporting activities and national initiatives across the country.

Together with his wife, Cecilia, he later established the Michael and Cecilia Foundation, which continued his commitment to philanthropic endeavours, with a focus on education, elderly care and Public health. The foundation also operates a primary school, a university and a coding and innovation hub in Delta State as part of its educational objectives.

== Chieftaincy ==
An aristocrat of his Urhobo homeland and a titled high chief within the Nigerian Chieftaincy Institution, Ibru was the traditional prime minister of Agbara-Otor Kingdom and also held several other respected titles within the traditional aristocracy.

== Freemasonry ==
Ibru was an eminent Freemason. He was a member of the Lagos Lodge No. 1171, the oldest masonic lodge in the District Grand Lodge of Nigeria, under the jurisdiction of the United Grand Lodge of England.

== Personal life ==
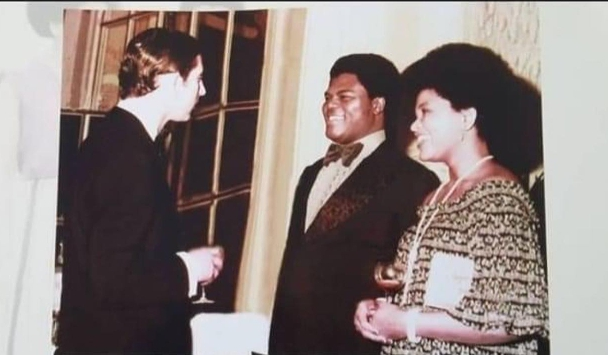
Michael and his wife, Cecilia Ibru, in conversation with Charles III at a dinner event held at The Ritz Hotel, London, 1980.

Ibru was married to five wives including, Cecilia Ibru. He had seventeen children, the most prominent being Oskar Ibru, who passed away in 2025. Today, the Ibru Organisation is run by third-generation members of the Ibru family, led by Christopher Ibru, Michael's eldest grandson.

== Death ==
Plaque commemorating the visit of Igbobi College Old Boys to the graveside of Chief Michael Ibru.

Ibru died at a medical facility in the United States on 6 September 2016. Following his death, President Muhammadu Buhari released a statement mourning Ibru and commending his immense achievements and dedication to entrepreneurship, which he said had opened new economic frontiers in Nigeria. The Nigerian Senate also observed a minute’s silence in his honour, describing him as having contributed significantly to the early development of Nigerian capitalism.

== Legacy ==
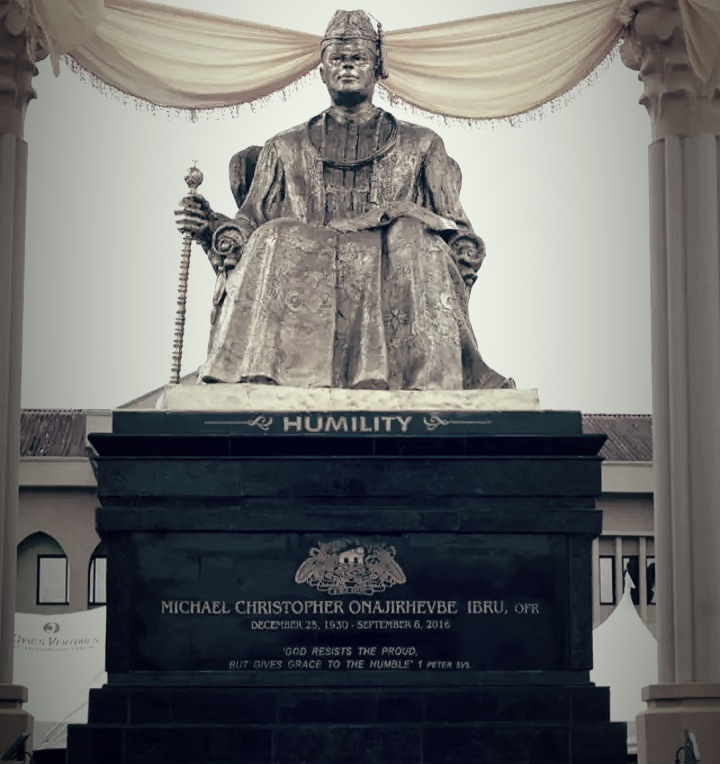
Statue of Michael Ibru in Delta State.

Ibru is regarded as the greatest Urhobo to have ever lived. In his essay The Age of Olorogun Michael Ibru, Professor Peter Ekeh, president of the Urhobo Historical Society, wrote that, according to Urhobo folk history, Chief Mukoro Mowoe (1890-1948) and Chief Michael Ibru (1930-2016) were the two dominant figures in Urhobo affairs since the arrival of British colonial rule. Ibru is credited with placing the Urhobo nation on the world map, and played a significant role in uplifting the image of the Urhobo people and improving their economic fortunes. He is also regarded as a cultural icon who not only embraced the customs and traditions of his people, but also devoted himself to ensuring the advancement of Urhobo cultural heritage. It was Ibru who popularized the use of the title "Olorogun" in place of "Chief".

Ibru is particularly celebrated for his commitment to family unity and collective growth. He brought his siblings along on his entrepreneurial journey, supporting their development into accomplished individuals in their own right, thereby helping to build one of Africa's most renowned business dynasties.

He is also remembered as a historic figure who founded one of Nigeria's first indigenous multinational conglomerates and helped shape the commercial and economic frontiers of a young Nigerian nation. Ibru's pioneering efforts in the frozen fish industry revolutionised the country's food distribution network and popularized the product as a staple in Nigerian diets.

The popular Creek Road in Apapa was named Olorogun Michael Ibru Boulevard in his honour. The Okpara Federal Railway Station in Delta State was also named after him by President Muhammadu Buhari. A Statue commemorating Ibru was subsequently unveiled in Delta State.

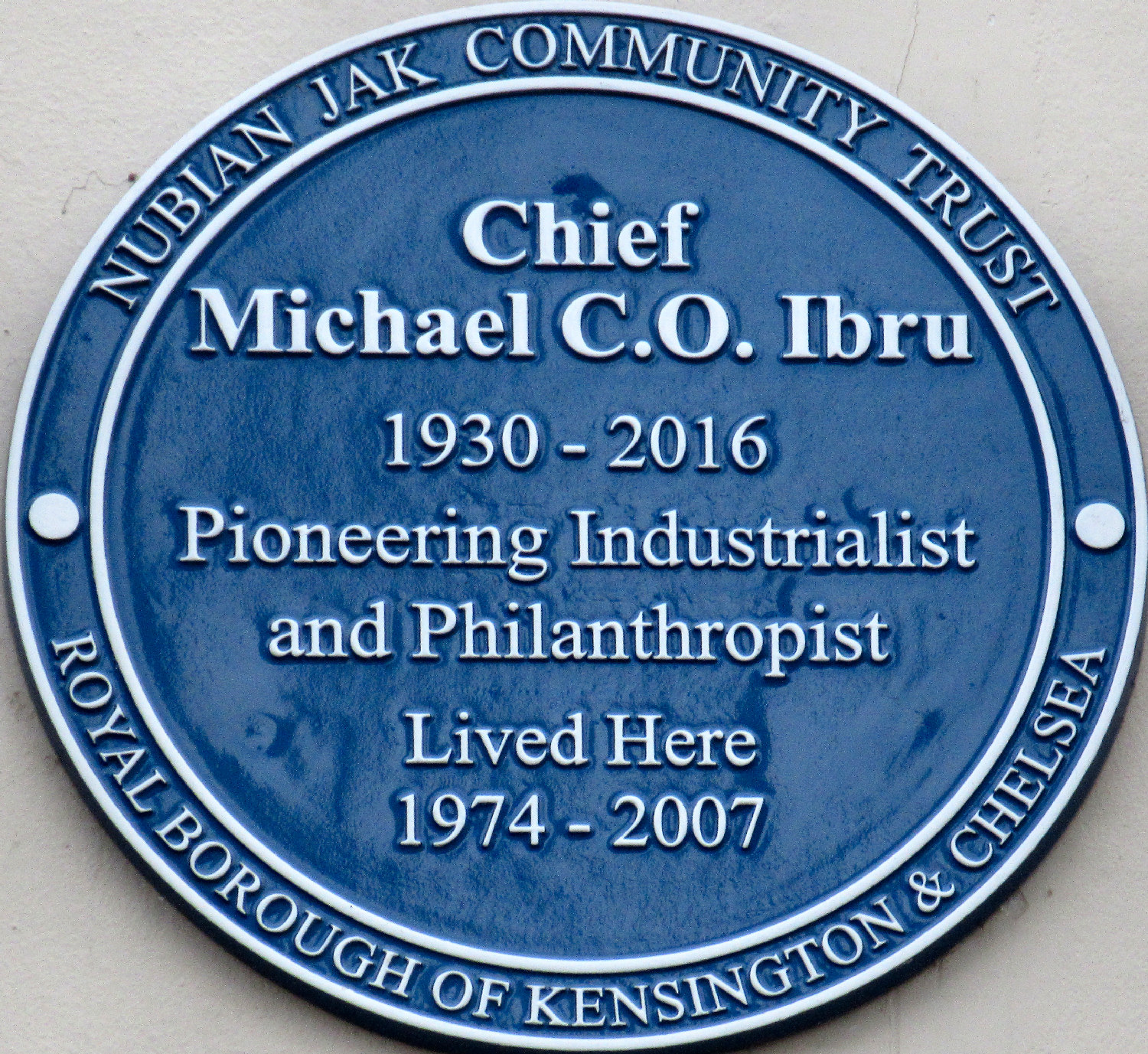
6 Kensington Park Gardens

In April 2023, Ibru was honoured with a blue heritage plaque by the Nubian Jak Community Trust and the Royal Borough of Kensington and Chelsea at his Kensington Park Gardens home, where he lived for 33 years. Honorees have included his compatriot Fela Kuti, Malcolm X, and Bob Marley.
