= Ibru family =

Nigerian business dynasty

- Business family
- Family emblem
- Parent family: Osadjere Royal family of Olomu
- Current region: Nigeria; United Kingdom; Ghana; United States
- Origin: Agbarha Kingdom, Delta State
- Current head: Goodie Ibru
- Titles: Olorogun; Otunba
- Traditions: Anglicanism
- Motto: Eki Ode

The Ibru family is a Nigerian business dynasty whose collective fortune is derived from the Ibru Organisation, one of the largest family-run conglomerates in Africa. The family rose to prominence in the late 1950s through the pioneering efforts of Michael Ibru in the frozen fish industry in West Africa.

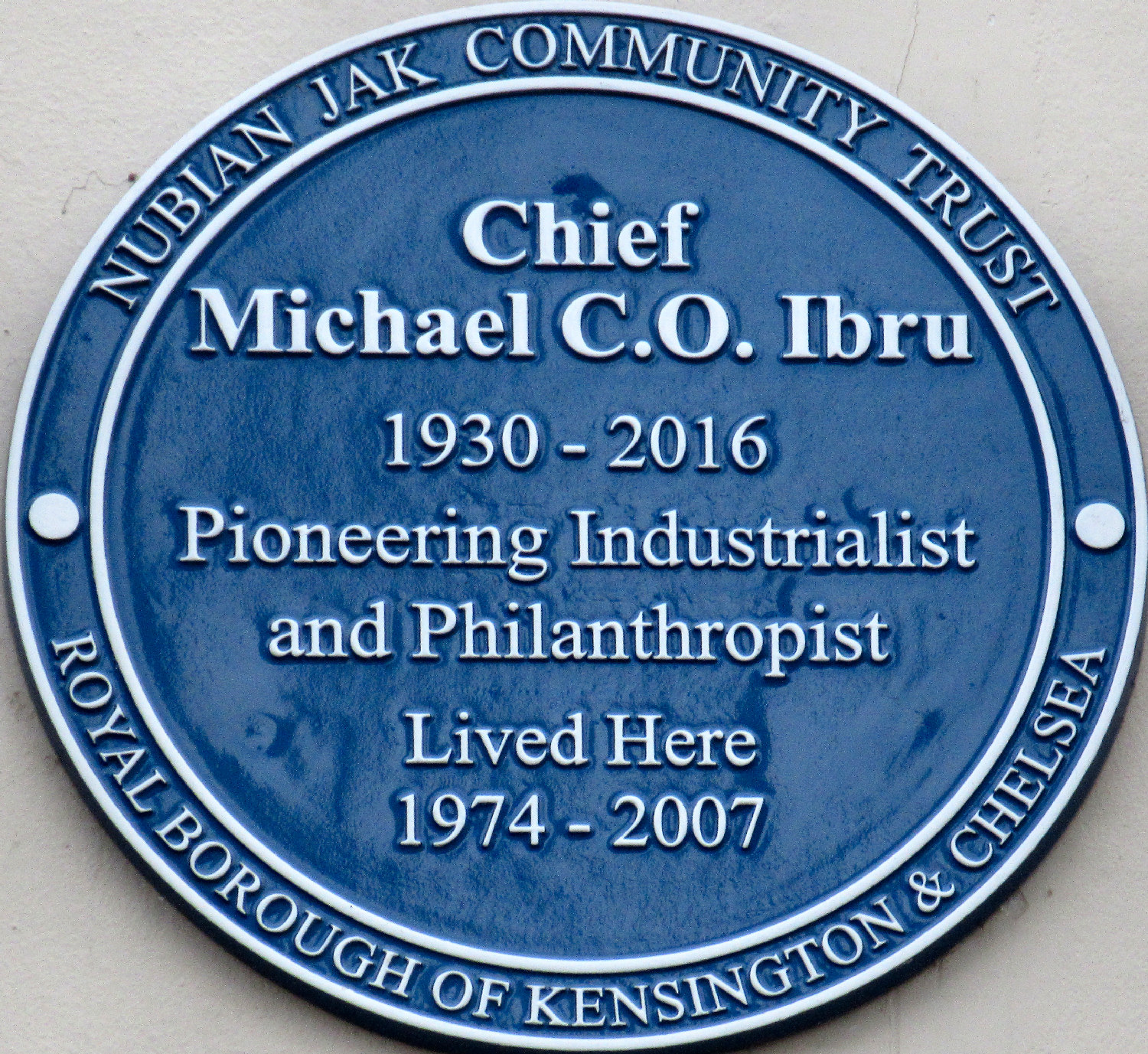
Blue heritage plaque commemorating Olorogun Michael Ibru at Kensington Park Gardens

== History ==
The founding patriarch of the family was Chief Peter Epete Ibru, a missionary who undertook most of his life's work in Yorubaland. He rose to the position of nursing superintendent at National Orthopaedic Hospital, Igbobi. Janet Omotogor Ibru, the family matriarch, was a trader and the daughter of Chief Adjefia Osadjere of Olomu, a wealthy 19th century merchant who built the first storey building in Urhoboland. Her brother, Ovedje Osadjere, was a warrant chief (1918-1923) in Colonial Nigeria and later reigned as the 8th Ohworode (King) of Olomu (1924-1949). His Royal Majesty, Macaulay Uhurhie-Osadjere II, her grand-nephew, was crowned the 13th Ohworode of Olomu Kingdom.

== Business origin ==
=== Michael Ibru ===
During the 1950s, Ibru ventured into the fish trade partly in response to protein deficiency in Nigeria. In an August 1988 newspaper interview, Michael Ibru recalled how he came to enter the fishing business, citing both its lack of appeal to merchants at the time and its potential to provide an affordable source of protein:

I reappraised the whole situation and decided to concentrate my efforts in two areas: (1) those items least popular among the merchants of the time. (2) Those things giving certain sociological or health benefits for the people. That’s how I came into the fishing business. It was underdeveloped, complicated, of messy nature, and offered little or no attraction to the then giant European trading houses nor did it attract the Nigerian merchants; so it met my first criterion. There was a large number of Nigerian children who lacked the appropriate quantity of protein in their diets and you know how that manifests itself. And so I thought of a way to combat this. Fish was a source of cheap animal protein. So the thing to do was to harvest the fish from the sea and get the fish to the people at the cheapest possible price.

Ibru secured a loan from the African Continental Bank (ACB) and established Ibru Sea Foods, introducing frozen fish to Nigeria in 1957. He initially faced resistance from the consumers, who referred to it as "mortuary fish". Ibru set up distribution networks, cold storage rooms and depots across the country and launched a vigorous educational campaign that successfully convinced the nation to accept frozen fish, which was later popularly known as Ibru fish ("Eja Ibru"). In 1963, he expanded his operations into fishing, chartering his first fishing vessel from Japan. Two years later, he set up a fishing company in partnership with a Japanese conglomerate. The company's operations included fishing for shrimp, herring, prawn and sardinella using purse seiners and long-distance freezer trawlers. Through the years, the family rose to become one of Africa's leading business dynasties while also producing notable figures in government.

== Philanthropy ==
The Ibru Ecumenical Centre, a Christian retreat and conference centre at Agbarha-Otor, Delta State, was donated to the Church of Nigeria (Anglican Communion) by businessman and philanthropist Alex Uruemu Ibru in 1989.

On 28 August 1992, then military Head of State Ibrahim Babangida presided over the foundation-laying ceremony for the centre's library at Agbarha-Otor.

In 2001, George Carey, Archbishop of Canterbury, visited the centre during his visit to Nigeria, where he blessed and planted a shaddock tree as a symbol of ecumenism.

In 2016, Dr. Kemi DaSilva-Ibru, founded the Women at Risk International Foundation (WARIF), a non-profit organisation addressing sexual and gender-based violence and human trafficking affecting women and girls in Nigeria. It operates a rape crisis centre providing medical care, psychosocial counselling and legal aid, alongside educational and community-based programmes. In 2024, DaSilva-Ibru was featured in Forbes' 50 Over 50: EMEA list, in recognition of her work in women's health and efforts to combat gender-based violence.

The family has also been involved in philanthropic work, supporting civil societies, education, healthcare, religious institutions and community development in Nigeria.

== Notable members ==
- Alex Ibru, founder of The Guardian (Nigeria) and former minister of internal affairs
- Cecilia Ibru, former managing director of Oceanic Bank
- Emmanuel Ibru, businessman and football administrator
- Elvina Ibru, Nollywood actress
- Felix Ibru, first executive governor of Delta State
- Goodie Ibru, founder of Ikeja Hotel Plc, former president of the Nigeria Stock Exchange
- Kemi DaSilva Ibru, specialist physician
- Maiden Alex Ibru, media executive
- Michael Ibru, founder of the Ibru Organisation
- Oskar Ibru, business magnate

== Companies ==
- Aero Contractors
- Ikeja Hotel Plc
- Oceanic Bank (defunct)

== Institutions ==
- AS Racines Football Club
- The Guardian
- Michael and Cecilia Ibru University
