= Ikeja Hotel Plc =

Nigerian hospitality company

- Industry: Hospitality
- Founded: November 18, 1972; 53 years ago
- Founder: Goodie Ibru
- Headquarters: Lagos, Nigeria
- Area served: Nigeria
- Revenue: ▲ ₦25.8 billion (2025)
- Parent: Ibru family (53.62%)
- Website: ikejahotelplc.com

Ikeja Hotel Plc, commonly known as Ikeja Hotels, is a Nigerian hospitality company that owns the Sheraton Lagos Hotel and the Federal Palace Hotel & Casino. Ikeja Hotel, through its subsidiary Hans Gremlin Limited, held a controlling interest in Capital Hotels Plc, the owner of the Abuja Continental Hotel, formerly known as the Abuja Sheraton Hotel.

== History ==
Ikeja Hotel was initially incorporated as Property Development Company on November 18, 1972. The company's name was later changed to Ikeja Hotel Limited in 1980. It became a public company in 1983 and was listed on the Nigerian Stock Exchange in the same year. The company assumed its present name on February 5, 1991. Ikeja Hotel' subsidiaries include Hans Gremlins Limited, through which it holds an indirect shareholding in Sheraton Hotels Abuja. The company is also a shareholder in Tourist Company of Nigeria Plc, which owns the Federal Palace Hotels and Casino, Lagos. Its principal business involves providing services in the hospitality industry, including developing other tourist facilities.

== Crisis ==
From 2014 to 2017, a significant crisis involved a protracted ownership tussle within the Ibru family. This pitted a faction led by Maiden Alex Ibru, against another led by the then hotel chairman, Goodie Ibru. In December 2014, Maiden Ibru, the widow of Alex Ibru, moved to effect a change in management by publishing a notice for an Extraordinary General Meeting (EGM). This was despite Goodie Ibru's faction obtaining a restraining order against the EGM from a Federal High Court in Abuja. At the EGM that happened in January 2015, and shareholders sacked Goodie Ibru as the chairman and director of the company due to alleged corporate governance infractions. An interim chairman, Rasheed Olaoluwa, the then managing director of the Bank of Industry (BOI), was appointed by the shareholders.

The Civil Society Network against Corruption alleged in August 2015 that Goodie Ibru mismanaged N10 billion belonging to Ikeja Hotel Plc and its subsidiaries. They filled 11-count charge to Economic and Financial Crimes Commission bordering on conspiracy and stealing against Mr. Ibru and others, alleging mismanagement of almost N2 billion in profits due to Ikeja Hotel Plc in 2010.

Due to the continued dispute between the major shareholders, which negatively impacted the company's governance structure, the Nigerian Stock Exchange suspended trading on the shares of Ikeja Hotel Plc on November 10, 2016. The NSE stated that this action was taken to protect shareholders' investments. The suspension lasted for 18 months and was lifted on Monday, May 21, 2018.

In November 2018, Ikeja Hotel Plc would go on to be noted as one of the most actively traded stocks on the Nigerian Stock Exchange.
