= Goodie Ibru =

Nigerian lawyer and businessman

Chief Goodie Ibru OON
- Born: May 11, 1942 (age 84); Nigeria
- Education: Ibadan Grammar School, University of London
- Occupation: Businessman
- Known for: Establishing the Sheraton Lagos Hotel; Former president of the Nigeria Stock Exchange
- Family: Ibru dynasty

Goodie Minabo Ibru OON (born 11 May 1942) is a Nigerian lawyer and businessman who founded Ikeja Hotel Plc, a major Nigerian hospitality company. He served as president of the Nigeria Stock Exchange from 1997 to 2000.

== Early life and education ==
Ibru was born on 11 May 1942 to Chief Peter Ibru and Janet Ibru. He obtained his primary school leaving certificate from Yaba Methodist school, Yaba and later went to Ibadan Grammar School, Ibadan.

He proceeded to the Holborn College of Law, University of London and graduated LLB (London) in 1965. He was called to the inner temple of the English Bar in 1966 and enrolled at the Supreme Court of Nigeria as Solicitor and Advocate in 1968, after which he founded the law firm G.M Ibru & Co where he was principal partner.

== Career ==
Ibru founded Ikeja Hotel Plc in 1972 and opened its flagship property, the Sheraton Lagos Hotel, in 1985. In 1992, the company acquired the Tourist Company of Nigeria Plc, the holding company of the Federal Palace Hotel. Ikeja Hotel Plc subsequently acquired a majority stake in Capital Hotel Plc, owners of the Abuja Sheraton Hotel, with Ibru serving as chairman.

Ibru was chairman of Aradel Holdings. He also served on the boards of several companies, including Guardian Press Limited, Dunlop Nigeria Plc, Crusader General Insurance Plc and Minet Nigeria Limited.

=== Legal disputes ===
In 2014, Maiden Ibru, the widow of Goodie's brother Alex Ibru, was locked in court battles over the chairmanship position of the company. Goodie Ibru was eventually removed as chairman at an extraordinary general meeting (EGM). The decision was challenged in court and the court eventually found that the removal was illegal and restored Ibru back to his position as chairman. Despite his victory he resigned two months later to pave way for younger members of the Ibru family to take up management positions. The court would later direct him to refund Ikeja Hotel Plc over unauthorised sale of Union Bank of Nigeria Shares as part of ongoing legal disputes.

== Leadership ==
Goodie Ibru served as President of the Lagos Chamber of Commerce and Industry, the Nigeria-Russia Business Council, and the NEPAD business Group. He was also executive vice president (West African Chapter) of the African Business Roundtable. Ibru was honorary consul of the Consulate of Lithuania to Nigeria. He also represented Nigeria as the co-chair for the UNWTO Committee on International Code of Ethics on Tourism.

== Award and membership ==
He is a member of the Lagos Rotary Club, the Metropolitan Club and the Ikoyi Club. He is Fellow of the Nigerian Institute of Management (NIM), the Institute of Directors (IoD) and the Chartered Institute of Administrators.

Ibru received the National Productivity Order of Merit (NPOM) in 2001 and was awarded Officer of the Order of the Niger (OON) in 2003. He won the Zik Prize for business leadership in 2014.
