= Federal Palace Hotel =

Hotel in Nigeria

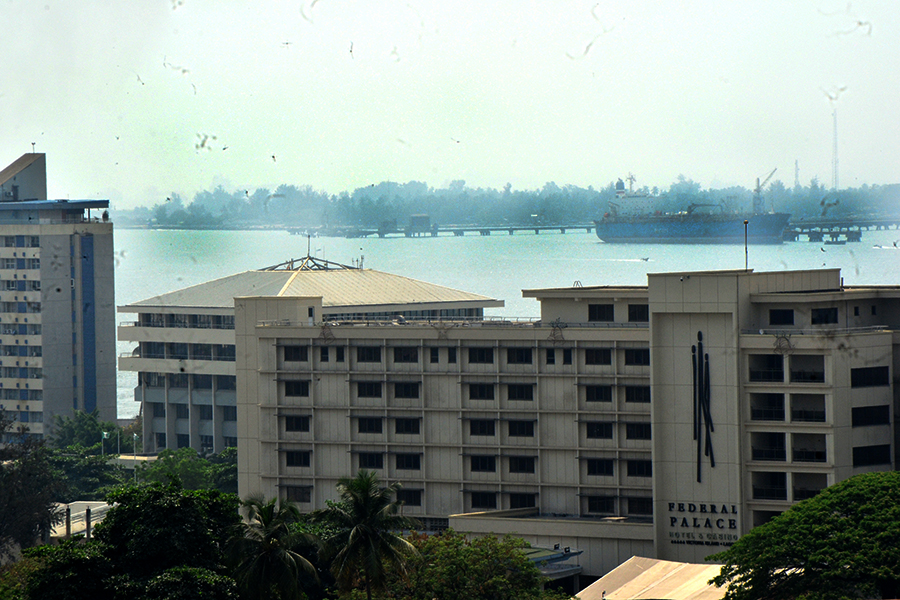
- Interactive map of the Federal Palace Hotel area

General information
- Location: Victoria Island, Lagos, Lagos State, Nigeria
- Coordinates: 6°25′53″N 3°24′25″E
- Opening: 1960
- Owner: Ikeja Hotel Plc

Other information
- Number of rooms: 150

Website
- www.suninternational.com/federal-palace/

The Federal Palace Hotel is a luxury hotel and casino in Victoria Island, Lagos, Nigeria. The hotel is notable for having been the setting for the signing of Nigeria's Declaration of Independence.

== Ownership ==
Established in 1960 to provide accommodation for dignitaries visiting Nigeria as part of the independence process, it was constructed and originally owned by the A. G. Leventis Group. The hotel was acquired by the Nigerian government in 1964 and went through a series of managers in the following years, falling into disrepair and partially recovering. In 1992, the government sold the hotel to the Ibru family (via Ikeja hotel Plc) for $50M, outbidding the Daewoo corporation of South Korea. In 2007, South Africa hospitality and gaming company Sun International purchased a 49% stake in the hotel, and became the hotel's operator. In 2019, Sun announced that it planned to sell its stake in the hotel due to disputes within the Ibru family over hotel leadership. In 2024, Sun sold 43% of its stake to an entity associated with the family of Alex Ibru.

== History ==
When Nigeria gained its independence from Britain in 1960, it was in the main boardroom of the newly constructed Federal Palace Hotel that Nigeria's independence declaration was signed. This boardroom is now one of the main features of the hotel's casino. The official celebration of Nigeria's independence took place in the hotel's Independence Hall, which, also in 1977, hosted the summit of heads of state of the Organization of African Unity and the Festival of African Arts and Culture (FESTAC).

== See also ==
- List of hotels in Lagos
