= Emmanuel Ibru =

Nigerian businessman and football administrator

- Ibru in 2017
- Education: Skidmore College
- Occupation: Chairman of AS Racine F.C.
- Known for: Business and football administration
- Relatives: Ibru family

Emmanuel Ibru is a Nigerian businessman primarily involved in the oil palm industry and football administration in Nigeria. He is the founder of AS Racine F.C. and a former board member of the Nigeria Football Association.

== Background ==
Ibru is a member of the Ibru dynasty, which traces its origins to Agbara-Otor in Delta State. He is a son of industrialist Michael Ibru and Elsie Nelly Ibru (née Krupp).

== Career ==
Ibru is an executive director of the Ibru Organisation and the chief executive officer of Aden River Estates, an oil palm company with plantations in Edo State. He is also the chairman of the Plantation Owners Forum of Nigeria (POFON).

Ibru is the proprietor of AS Racine Football Club and was a member of the Nigeria Football Association from 2002 to 2005.

In 2008, Ibru was named chairman of the marketing committee of the Lagos sub-seat of the Local Organising Committee for the 2009 FIFA U-17 World Cup. In November 2009, former Arsenal vice-chairman David Dein visited Lagos for the tournament, courtesy of Ibru.

In 2010, Ibru was part of a group that acquired the former Julius Berger Football Club of Lagos and established Bridge F.C..

Ibru is a grand patron of the Nigeria Deaf Football Association and in 2017 sponsored the team's participation in the West Africa Deaf Football Union tournament (WADFU) in Bamako, Mali.

By 2021, Ibru had managed the AS Racine Football Academy for 23 years. That year, he partnered with former Nigeria international Victor Agali to organise the Victor Agali/AS Racine U-17 Grassroots Football Scouting Tournament in Agbarha-Otor, Delta State. The tournament was attended by Super Eagles technical adviser Gernot Rohr.

He served as president of the Nigerian–Brazil Chamber of Commerce and Industry and advocated for the establishment of a direct air link between Nigeria and Brazil to promote trade between the two countries.
