= Felix Ibru =

Nigerian politician

His Excellency Olorogun Felix Ibru CON

Governor of Delta State
- In office 2 January 1992 – 17 November 1993

Senator of the Federal Republic of Nigeria from Delta Central Senatorial District
- In office May 2003 – May 2007
- Preceded by: Fred Aghogho Brume
- Succeeded by: Adego Erhiawarie Eferakeya

Personal details
- Born: 7 December 1935 Ughelli North LGA, Delta State, Nigeria
- Died: 12 March 2016 (aged 80)
- Resting place: Rehoboth Place, Agbarha-Otor, Delta State, Nigeria
- Relations: Ibru family
- Education: Igbobi College; Nottingham School of Architecture; Israel Institute of Technology

Felix Ovudoroye Ibru CON (7 December 1935 – 12 March 2016) was a Nigerian architect, businessman and politician who served as the first executive governor of Delta State from 1992 to 1993 and as a Senator representing Delta Central Senatorial District from 2003 to 2007.

== Early life and education ==
Ibru was born on 7 December 1935 at Agbarha-Otor in the Ughelli North local government area of Delta State to Chief Peter Epete Ibru and Chief (Mrs). Janet Omotogor Ibru, the second of seven children. His brother Michael Ibru is the founder of the Ibru Organization, a major conglomerate.

He was educated at Yaba Methodist School, and later Igbobi College where he was Head Boy in 1955. He won the Elder Dempster Lines Scholarship to travel to the United Kingdom. After his secondary school education at Igbobi College, Ibru proceeded to the Nottingham School of Architecture in England.

While a student in Nottingham, he was elected the first Black President of the British Council with responsibility for Nottinghamshire, Derbyshire, Lincolnshire and Leicestershire. As a result, he had an Audience with Queen Elizabeth II and Prince Philip, Duke of Edinburgh at a ceremony at Buckingham Palace in 1960.

Shortly after his qualification as an architect in 1962, he worked briefly with the Jewish Agency SOCHNUT, on various projects relating to farm settlements (kibbutzim and moshavim) and prefabricated buildings in Jerusalem and Haifa. He later enrolled at the Technion – Israel Institute of Technology for post-graduate studies and qualified with an MSc (Arch) in 1963. He returned to Nigeria at the end of that year and took up an appointment with the Nigerian Federal Ministry of Education as the first resident Lecturer in Architecture at the Yaba College of Technology.

== Business career ==
Ibru established an architectural firm, Roye Ibru Associates, which, in 1971, went into partnership with Alan Vaughan-Richards and Associates to establish the firm of Ibru Vaughan-Richards and Associates (Planning Partnership). As one of the two principal partners of the firm, Chief Ibru was involved in the design and supervision of more than 40 projects across the country. They include: University of Lagos Sports Centre, Oguta Lake Resort, The Diette-Spiff Civic Centre, Port Harcourt, Office extension for Elf Nig. Ltd. Victoria Island, Lagos University master plan, New Layout Market, Port Harcourt, Mile 3 Diobu Market, Port Harcourt, Sheraton Lagos Hotel & Towers, Ikeja, University of Benin sports centre, University of Benin Master plan, Faculty of Science buildings, University of Benin & Ogun State and the Ogun State Polytechnic Master plan.

As consultant to Ibru Prefabs Limited, he was responsible for the design and supervision of several geodesic domes of various dimensions in many parts of the country. In 1971, under the auspices of the United Nations, he was invited to Tokyo, Japan, as a member of a panel on foreign investment. In 1974, he delivered a lecture at the Harvard Business School, in the United States on Multinationals. It was titled "Emerging Role Of The African Entrepreneur In The Economy And Its Relationship With Multinational Corporations: Competition, Partnership, Cooperation and Absorption".

== Political career ==
Ibru's political activities began in 1983, when he unsuccessfully contested for a seat in the Senate. He ran for the governorship of Delta State in 1991 and emerged as the first elected governor of the newly created Delta State in 1992. He later won the 2003 senatorial elections for Delta Central.

== Urhobo affairs ==
Ibru was a traditional chieftain of his homeland and bore the title Olorogun, which he commonly used as a pre-nominal title. He served as President-General of the Urhobo Progressive Union (UPU) from 2007 to 2010.

== Memberships ==
He was elected member of the Nigerian Institute of Architects (NIA) in 1969, registered by the Architects Registration Council of Nigeria (ARCON) in 1971, elected Fellow of the Nigerian Institute of Architects in 1995 and a Fellowship of the Nigerian Institute of Public Relations (NIPR).

== Personal life ==
Felix Ibru died on 12 March 2016 at the age of 80. Ibru was married with 6 children and 6 grandchildren all of whom survive him.

== See also ==
- List of Nigerian architects
