= Kemi DaSilva Ibru =

Nigerian physician, obstetrician, and gynaecologist

Dr. Kemi DaSilva-Ibru
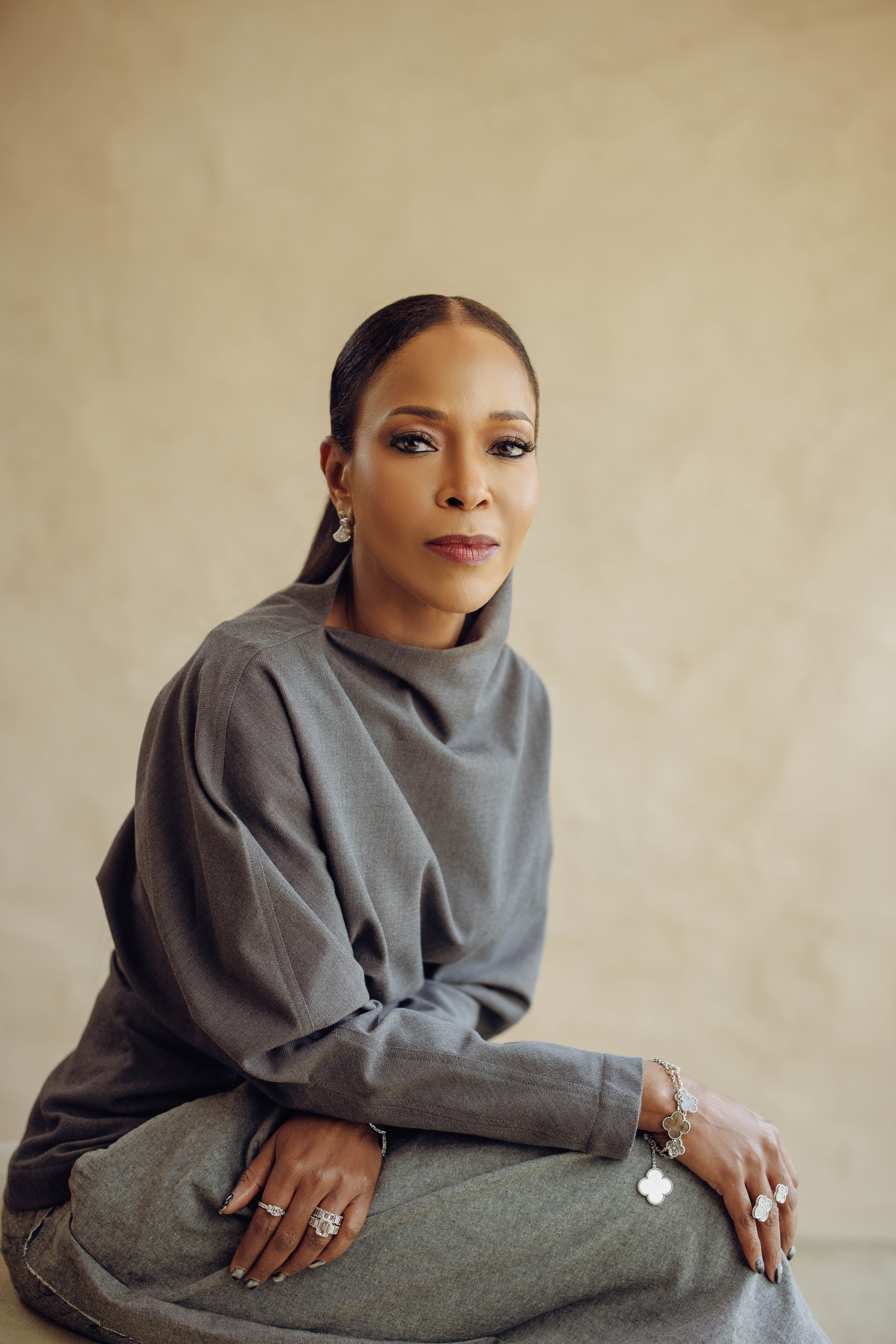
- Born: Anita Kemi DaSilva; 21 June 1969 (age 57)
- Education: Howard University; Johns Hopkins School of Public Health
- Occupations: Obstetrician and Gynaecologist
- Known for: Gender Advocacy
- Family: Ibru dynasty

Kemi DaSilva-Ibru (born 21 June 1969) is a Nigerian physician, obstetrician, and gynaecologist, known for her social activism and advocacy against gender-based violence.

== Education ==
DaSilva-Ibru graduated from the College of Medicine, University of Lagos. She completed her postgraduate training in obstetrics and gynaecology at Howard University, Washington D.C., and obtained a master's degree from the Johns Hopkins Bloomberg School of Public Health in Baltimore.

== Career ==
DaSilva-Ibru's medical career has spanned three decades across three continents as a practicing obstetrician and gynecologist. She's the founder of the Women at Risk International Foundation (WARIF), a non-profit organization that addresses gender-based violence, rape and human trafficking involving young girls and women in Nigeria. Through her work, she has become an internationally recognized expert in the gender space and in the field of women's health.

== Award and Recognition ==
DaSilva-Ibru has received several awards and recognitions for her work in women's health and the prevention of gender-based violence. In 2019, she was named one of BBC's 100 Women. She has also been recognised by the British Council in Nigeria. In 2020, she received the Social Impact Award at the Eloy Awards and was recognised as a CNN COVID Hero and Newsmaker. In 2021, she was named a TIME Next Generation Leader. In 2022, she received an Award of Excellence from Nigeria's Federal Ministry of Women Affairs for her contribution to ending violence against women and girls. In 2024, she was included in the Forbes 50 Over 50 list for Europe, the Middle East and Africa. In 2025, she was named the winner of the RMB Africa's Fearless Thinker Award at the Gender Mainstreaming Awards. In 2026, she was among the women honoured at the Africa Women of Impact Awards by ARISE News. DaSilva-Ibru was appointed co-chairperson for the United Nations ACT global steering committee on ending violence against women and girls.
