= St Andrew's Prep =

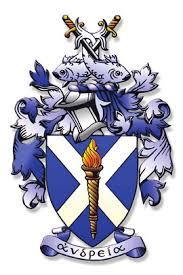

Location
- Meads Street; Meads; Eastbourne, East Sussex, BN20 7RP; 50.754162°N 0.267127°E

Information
- Type: Preparatory school
- Religious affiliation: Church of England
- Patron saint: St Andrew
- Established: 1877; 149 years ago
- Founder: Reverend Francis Souper
- President: The Duke of Devonshire
- Headmaster: Tom Gregory
- Gender: Co-educational
- Age range: 9 months to 13 years
- Enrollment: 370
- Houses: Arcos, Rovers, Sea Kings, VCs
- Colors: Maroon; Green; Crimson
- Publication: The Androvian; The Old Androvian
- Feeder to: Eastbourne College
- Website: https://www.standrewsprep.co.uk

St Andrew's Prep (officially St Andrew's Preparatory School) is an independent boarding and day school for boys and girls aged 9 months to 13 years in Meads, Eastbourne, East Sussex on the south coast of England. The school was founded in 1877 by the Reverend Francis Souper as a boys' boarding preparatory school. It was originally named ‘Meads.’ In 1964, the school began admitting day boys, and in 1976, girls. In 2010, the school became part of the Eastbourne College Charity.

== History ==
In 1865, the Colstocks Farm, then on the South Downs, was bought by a Mr Goodwin, who was to found the first school on the site. In 1877 the Reverend Francis Souper came to Eastbourne with his wife and family. He bought Colstocks Farm from Mr Goodwin and called the school ‘Meads’ until 1882, when he decided to name it after St Andrew, the disciple whom Jesus had first met by the sea.’

== Houses ==
The original St Andrew's house system was established in 1904 by headmaster E. L. Browne. E. L. Browne (known as E. L. B. by pupils), was headmaster at the school for an amazing 43 years. He divided the children into 'sets' and those sets were named after the teachers who led them. The names of these houses are still used today. Every pupil and member of staff is a member of a house.
