= Victor Agali =

Nigerian footballer (born 1978)

Personal information
- Full name: Victor Okechukwu Agali
- Date of birth: 29 December 1978 (age 47)
- Place of birth: Okpanam, Nigeria
- Height: 1.93 m (6 ft 4 in)
- Position: Forward

Senior career*
Years	Team	Apps	(Gls)
1995	Princess Jegede		
1996	Nitel Lagos		
1997	Marseille	5	(0)
1997–1998	Toulon	38	(15)
1998–2001	Hansa Rostock	66	(17)
2001–2004	Schalke 04	54	(14)
2004–2005	Nice	30	(6)
2005–2006	Kayseri Erciyesspor	30	(5)
2006–2007	Ankaragücü	12	(3)
2007–2008	Hansa Rostock	24	(1)
2008–2009	Skoda Xanthi	23	(5)
2009	Anorthosis Famagusta	0	(0)
2009–2010	Levadiakos	19	(4)
2010	Jiangsu Sainty	17	(5)
Total		318	(75)

International career
2000–2004	Nigeria	12	(5)
- * Club domestic league appearances and goals

Victor Okechukwu Agali (born 29 December 1978) is a Nigerian former professional footballer who played as a forward.

== Career ==
In 1997, Agali joined French club Olympique de Marseille. Finding it hard to establish a first team place, he quickly moved to Sporting Toulon Var and subsequently to Germany where he played in Hansa Rostock and Schalke 04. From 2005 to 2007 he played in the Turkish Süper Lig, returning to German Bundesliga team Rostock in August 2007. At Rostock Agali did not do well, after just one goal in 23 league matches he was given a free transfer to the Greek club Skoda Xanthi. After a season with Greek club Skoda Xanthi the Nigerian striker has signed for Anorthosis Famagusta.

On 27 December 2009, he was arrested at Schiphol airport near Amsterdam for carrying fake passports.

He moved in summer 2010 to the Chinese Super League club Jiangsu Sainty.

Agali is the head coach of AS Racine FC, a Lagos based professional football club that competes in the Nigeria National League.

== International career ==
Agali has played for Nigeria at a number of occasions, including the 2000 Summer Olympics.

Scores and results list Nigeria's goal tally first, score column indicates score after each Agali goal.

List of international goals scored by Victor Agali
No.	Date	Venue	Opponent	Score	Result	Competition	Ref.
1	13 January 2001	National Stadium, Lagos, Nigeria\	Zambia	1–0	1–0	2002 African Cup of Nations qualification	
2	27 January 2001	Liberation Stadium, Port Harcourt, Nigeria	Sudan	1–0	3–0	2002 FIFA World Cup qualification	
3	27 January 2001	Liberation Stadium, Port Harcourt, Nigeria	Sudan	2–0	3–0	2002 FIFA World Cup qualification	
4	5 May 2001	Liberation Stadium, Port Harcourt, Nigeria	Liberia	2–0	2–0	2002 FIFA World Cup qualification	
5	29 July 2001	Liberation Stadium, Port Harcourt, Nigeria	Ghana	1–0	3–0	2002 FIFA World Cup qualification	

== Honours ==
=== Club ===
Schalke 04

- UEFA Intertoto Cup: 2003

=== International ===
Nigeria

- Africa Cup of Nations third place: 2004
