= List of Masonic Grand Lodges in Africa =

This is a list of all verifiable organizations that claim to be a Masonic Grand Lodge in Africa.

A Masonic "Grand Lodge" (or sometimes "Grand Orient") is the governing body that supervises the individual "Lodges of Freemasons" in a particular geographical area, known as its "jurisdiction" (usually corresponding to a sovereign state or other major geopolitical unit). Some are large, with thousands of members divided into hundreds of subordinate lodges, while others are tiny, with only a few members split between a handful of local lodges. Sometimes there will only be one Grand Lodge in a given area, but the majority of the time there will be at least two. More often, there will be several competing Grand Lodges claiming the same jurisdictional area, or claiming overlapping areas. This fact leads to debates over legitimacy: Not all Grand Lodges and Grand Orients recognize each other as being legitimate. However, such recognition is not relevant to this list, yet recognition is foundational within the fraternal order. Inclusion in this list only requires the establishment of a physical (as opposed to a virtual, or online) presence, and lodges (regular, unrecognized or clandestine) which acknowledge their governance.

Membership numbers are subject to change; for current figures, check the sources which are indicated in the reference section.

== Africa ==
Jurisdictional area	Name	Founded	Lodges	Members	Notes
Benin	Grand Bénin de la République du Bénin [GBRB] (Great Benin of the Republic of Benin)	1967			CLIPSAS
Benin	Grande Loge du Bénin (Grand Lodge of Bénin)	1995	17	450	
Burkina Faso	Grande Loge du Burkina Faso (Grand Lodge of Burkina Faso)	1997	10	375	
Cameroon	Grande Loge Nationale du Cameroun (National Grand Lodge of Cameroon)	2001	4	222	
Cameroon	Grande Loge Féminine de France		1		GLFF
Cameroon	Grand Loge Unie du Cameroun (United Grand Lodge of Cameroon)				Formerly Grand Orient et Loge Unie du Cameroon, an alliance of former Grand Orient and Grande Loge de France lodges. CLIPSAS
Congo, Democratic Republic of	Grande Loge Nationale du Congo du Rite Ancien et Primitif Memphis-Misraim	1986	3		
Congo, Democratic Republic of	Grande Loge de France, District Congo (Grand Lodge of France, Congo District)		4		REHFRAM
Congo, Democratic Republic of	Grand Orient du Congo (Grand Orient of the Congo)	1973	3		CLIPSAS
Congo, Republic of	Grande Loge du Congo				
Congo, Republic of	Grands Orient & Loge Associés du Congo (Associated Grand Orient and Lodge of the Congo)				CLIPSAS
Congo, Republic of	Grande Loge Régulière Congolaise (Regular Grand Lodge of the Congo)	2025	4		WCMF
Gabon	Grande Loge du Gabon (Grand Lodge of Gabon)	1983	14		
Gabon	Grande Loge Symbolique du Gabon (Symbolic Grand Lodge of Gabon)	1975	14		
Gabon	Grande Loge Féminine de France				GLFF
Ghana	District Grand Lodge of Ghana, English Constitution	1810	57		
Ghana	Grand Lodge of Ghana	2009	49		
Guinea	Le Droit Humain – Jurisdiction de la Guinée Conackry				DH Fédération Ouest Africaine
Ivory Coast	Grande Loge de Côte d'Ivoire (Grand Lodge of the Ivory Coast)	1989	27	1,000	
Ivory Coast	Le Droit Humain – Jurisdiction de la Côte d'Ivoire				DH Fédération Ouest Africaine
Liberia	Grand Lodge of the Republic of Liberia	1867			
Madagascar	Grande Loge Traditionnelle et Symbolique de Madagascar [GLTSM]	1997			
Madagascar	Le Droit Humain – Jurisdiction de Madagascar (Le Droit Humain, Madagascar Jurisdiction)		6		DH
Madagascar	Grande Loge Nationale de Madagascar (National Grand Lodge of Madagascar)	1996	9	232	
Madagascar	Grand Rite Malgache				CLIPSAS
Mali	Le Droit Humain – Jurisdiction de Mali (Le Droit Humain, Mali Jurisdiction)		1		DH Fédération Ouest Africaine
Mali	Grande Loge Nationale Malienne (National Grand Lodge of Mali)				
Mauritius	Grand Lodge of Mauritius	2005	15	389	
Mauritius	Le Droit Humain – Jurisdiction de la Ile Maurice (Le Droit Humain, Mauritius Jurisdiction)		1		DH
Morocco	Grande Loge du Maroc	1964			CLIPSAS, UMM
Morocco	Grande Loge Régulière du Royaume du Maroc [GLRRM] (Regular Grand Lodge of the Kingdom of Morocco)	2000	7		United Grand Lodge of England
Morocco	Grande Loge unie du Maroc (United Grand Lodge of Morocco)	2005	5	80	GLUDE
Morocco	Grand Orient du Maroc (GODM)	2009	2		
Morocco	Grande Loge Féminine du Maroc (Women's Grand Lodge of Morocco)	2011	3		CLIPSAS
Morocco	Grande Loge Nationale Marocaine (GLNM)	2016	8	80	CGLEM
Morocco	Grande Loge Mixte du Maroc (GLMM)	2018	3		
Morocco	Grand Orient Maroc-Méditerranée (GOMM)	2018	2		
Nigeria	District Grand Lodge of Nigeria (UGLE)	1806	35		
Nigeria	Grand Lodge of Nigeria	2012			
Senegal	Le Droit Humain – Jurisdiction de Sénégal				DH Fédération Ouest Africaine
Senegal	Grand Lodge of Senegal	1993	12		
Senegal	Grande Loge Féminine de France				GLFF
South Africa	Grand Lodge of South Africa	1961	64	3300	
South Africa	South African Federation, The International Order of Co-Freemasonry, Le Droit Humain	1912	4		DH
Togo	Grande Loge Nationale Togolaise (National Grand Lodge of Togo)	1992	48	1,500	
Togo	Le Droit Humain – Jurisdiction de Togo (Le Droit Humain, Togo Jurisdiction)				DH Fédération Ouest Africaine
Zambia	District Grand Lodge of Zambia	January 1, 1967	19-20		

== See also ==
- List of Masonic Grand Lodges
