= Alex Ibru =

Nigerian businessman (1945–2011)

Chief Alex Ibru CON

Minister of Internal Affairs
- In office 1993–1995

Personal details
- Born: 1 March 1945 Agbhara-Otor, Delta State
- Died: 20 November 2011 (aged 66) Nigeria
- Spouse: Maiden Alex Ibru
- Relations: Ibru family
- Children: Sophia, Alexandra, Annabella, Anita, Toke, Ose, Tive, Uvie
- Education: Igbobi College

Alexander Uruemu Ibru CON (1 March 1945 – 20 November 2011) was a Nigerian businessman, founder and publisher of The Guardian newspaper, who was minister of Internal Affairs from 1993 to 1995 during the military regime of General Sani Abacha.

== Background ==
Ibru was the son of Chief Peter and Janet Ibru, and a brother of Michael Ibru, founder of the Ibru Organisation. Ibru was born on 1 March 1945 in Agbara-Otor, in today's Delta State. He attended the Yaba Methodist Primary School (1951–1957), Ibadan Grammar School (1958–1960), Igbobi College, Lagos (1960–1963) and Nottingham Trent University in the United Kingdom (1967–1970), where he studied business economics.

== Business career ==
Ibru was chairman of Rutam Motors, a subsidiary of the Ibru conglomerate. In 1983, he met with the newspapermen Stanley Mecebuh of Daily Times of Nigeria, Patrick Dele-Cole also formerly of that paper and Olusegun Osoba, formerly of Nigerian Herald. With 55% funding from the Ibrus, they launched The Guardian in 1983, with Alex Ibru as chairman.

The Guardian had various pro-left academics on its board, with a clear bias towards Obafemi Awolowo's Unity Party of Nigeria, and the first editor Lade Bonuola was held to strongly support the UPN. On the other hand, Ibru was from a billionaire business family and Stanley Macebuh was right wing in his views, so the paper tried to maintain a balance. The stated goal of the paper were to provide an independent and balanced view.

The success of The Guardian made it clear that there was an appetite for high quality journalism in Nigeria and it was followed by news magazines such as Newswatch.

The military regime did not appreciate the paper's independence and it was persecuted under military ruler General Muhammadu Buhari (January 1984 – August 1985).

Ibru provided funding to the Civil Liberties Organization (CLO), established during the military regime of Buhari's successor, General Ibrahim Babangida.

== Political career ==
Ibru was minister of internal affairs from 1993 to 1995 in the Sani Abacha government. His appointment by Abacha was seen as a gesture of appeasement to the press.

In December 1993, there were violent clashes between the Ogoni and Okrika people in the slums of Port Harcourt in Rivers State. Ibru led a committee to tour Ogoniland and investigate the causes of unrest. Other members were Don Etiebet, minister of petroleum reserves, and Melford Okilo, minister of tourism.The military administrator of the state, Dauda Musa Komo, escorted the group. Embarrassingly for the military regime, during the trip a large crowd demonstrated in Bori blaming Shell Oil pollution for their problems.

Ibru had told his staff at The Guardian that he would not get involved in partisan politics. Despite this, the newspaper was highly critical of the Abacha regime. On 14 August 1994, The Guardian offices were raided and shut down by the government, although Ibru retained his post. The newspapers were only allowed to reopen in October 1994 following an apology by Ibru for any offensive comments that may have appeared.

== Assassination attempt ==
On 2 February 1996, his car was sprayed with machine gun fire from unidentified men who had trailed him in a deep-blue Peugeot. He survived the assassination attempt, but sustained serious injuries that resulted in the loss of his left eye and two fingers. Ibru was later flown to England for treatment of his injuries.

After Abacha's death in 1998, his chief security officer, Hamza Al-Mustapha, and others were charged with the assassination attempt.

=== Death ===
Alex Ibru died on 20 November 2011, aged 66.
