= Chris Okolie =

Nigerian journalist and politician

Chief Chris Okolie
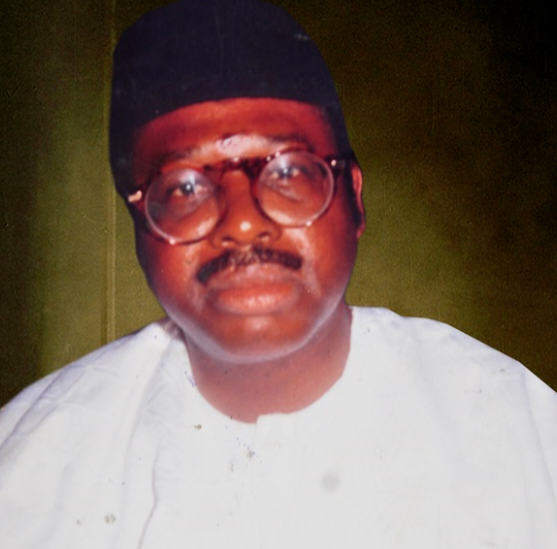
- Born: 6 July 1949 (age 77); Nigeria
- Education: Watford College Manchester University
- Organization: New Breed Magazine
- Spouse: Mabel Ibru

Chris Maduabrochukwu Okolie (6 July 1949 – 4 March 2007) was a Nigerian lawyer, journalist and publisher who founded New Breed Organization, publishers of the now defunct New Breed Magazine.

== Early life ==
Okolie started out as a music promoter in the late 1960s, promoting small shows at the J.K. Randle and YMCA halls in Lagos. He then briefly studied advertising at Watford College, London before returning to Nigeria.

== Career ==
=== Journalism ===
In 1972, he established New Breed, a biweekly news magazine published from Ogunlana Drive in Surulere. As the publisher, he sometimes came into conflict with military leaders in the country. In 1977, he was detained by authorities who did not like an article that was printed in the magazine. In June 1978, the government confiscated thousands of copies of the magazine and further imposed a ban on publication. The magazine resumed publication in 1987, nine years after the ban. He was again arrested and detained by the military regime of Ibrahim Babangida in 1993.

Okolie was a prominent critic of Nigeria’s military regimes. He was also one of the leading journalists who fought for press freedom and democracy during the years of military dictatorship.

=== Politics ===
In 1992, he joined the political process, Okolie was the SDP senatorial candidate for Delta North in the 1992 elections but was disqualified days before the election, along with 32 other senatorial candidates from the SDP and NRC. He was a member and spokesperson for the Committee of National Consensus in 1996, but moved to the United Nigeria Congress Party in 1997. Okolie later served as the Deputy National Legal Adviser of the PDP.

== Death ==
He died on March 4, 2007, from complications related to a car accident in 2005. He is buried in Okpanam, Delta State.
