= Cecilia Ibru =

Nigerian banker

Cecilia Ibru OFR
- Born: Cecilia Sido; 22 March 1946 (age 80); Nigeria
- Occupation: bank chief
- Criminal charges: 25 counts of corporate fraud; convicted on 3 counts
- Relatives: Ibru family

Cecilia Emuakpo Ibru (born 22 March 1946) is a Nigerian banker who was chief executive officer of Oceanic Bank until she was convicted in 2010 of authorising loans beyond her credit limit, rendering false accounts and approving loans without adequate collateral. She was Nigeria's first female bank CEO and was dubbed the "first lady of banking".

== Early life and education ==
Born to Edward and Victoria Sido, Ibru attended Saint Margaret's Grammar School in Ilesa from 1960 to 1965 and studied at University Tutorial College in London from 1967 to 1968. She graduated from the University of London in 1971 with a BS in sociology. Ibru pursued her graduate studies at the university and received a Masters of Philosophy from the SOAS University of London in 1977.

== Career ==
Cecilia Ibru joined the Ibru Organization, led by her husband Michael Ibru, as project director in 1978. After two years in this role, Ibru became international finance coordinator, a position she held until 1990.

Ibru began working with Oceanic Bank in 1990 as general manager. After seven years with Oceanic, she was promoted to managing director and CEO. Oceanic began as a small family-owned bank, but grew into one of Nigeria's largest publicly quoted institutions during Ibru's stewardship.

== Banking scandal ==
On 13 August 2009 Ibru was among five bank CEOs who were dismissed. Five replacements were named by the Central Bank of Nigeria. The deputy governor, Sarah Alade, announced that John Aboh would replace Ibru at Oceanic. Others replaced on the same day included the CEO of the Union Bank of Nigeria, Dr. Bath Ebong, who was replaced by Olufunke Iyabo Osibodu.

Ibru appeared in court alongside three other senior banking executives in Nigeria. They all denied charges that they were involved in a multibillion-dollar banking scandal. Anti-corruption police brought criminal charges against executives from five banks rescued in a 400bn naira ($2.6bn; £1.6bn) government bail-out. All the banks were found to have low cash reserves because of bad loans. It was alleged that Ibru extended credit facilities of N16B to a company that had no collateral. On 8 October 2010, Ibru was convicted on three-counts of corporate fraud, and sentenced to six months of prison. She was ordered to reimburse $1.2B (£786m) in cash and assets to the authorities. The court confiscated over 100 properties from her in Nigeria, Dubai and the United States.

== Honors and philanthropy ==
Ibru and her husband co-founded the Michael and Cecilia Ibru University in 2015 in Agbara-Otor, Delta State. She became a member of the Order of the Federal Republic in 2004, and an officer in 2008. She has been a trustee of the United Nations Development Fund for Women and a board member of the United Nations Global Compact.
