= Igbobi College =

College in Nigeria

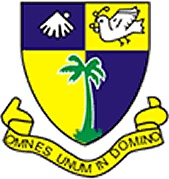

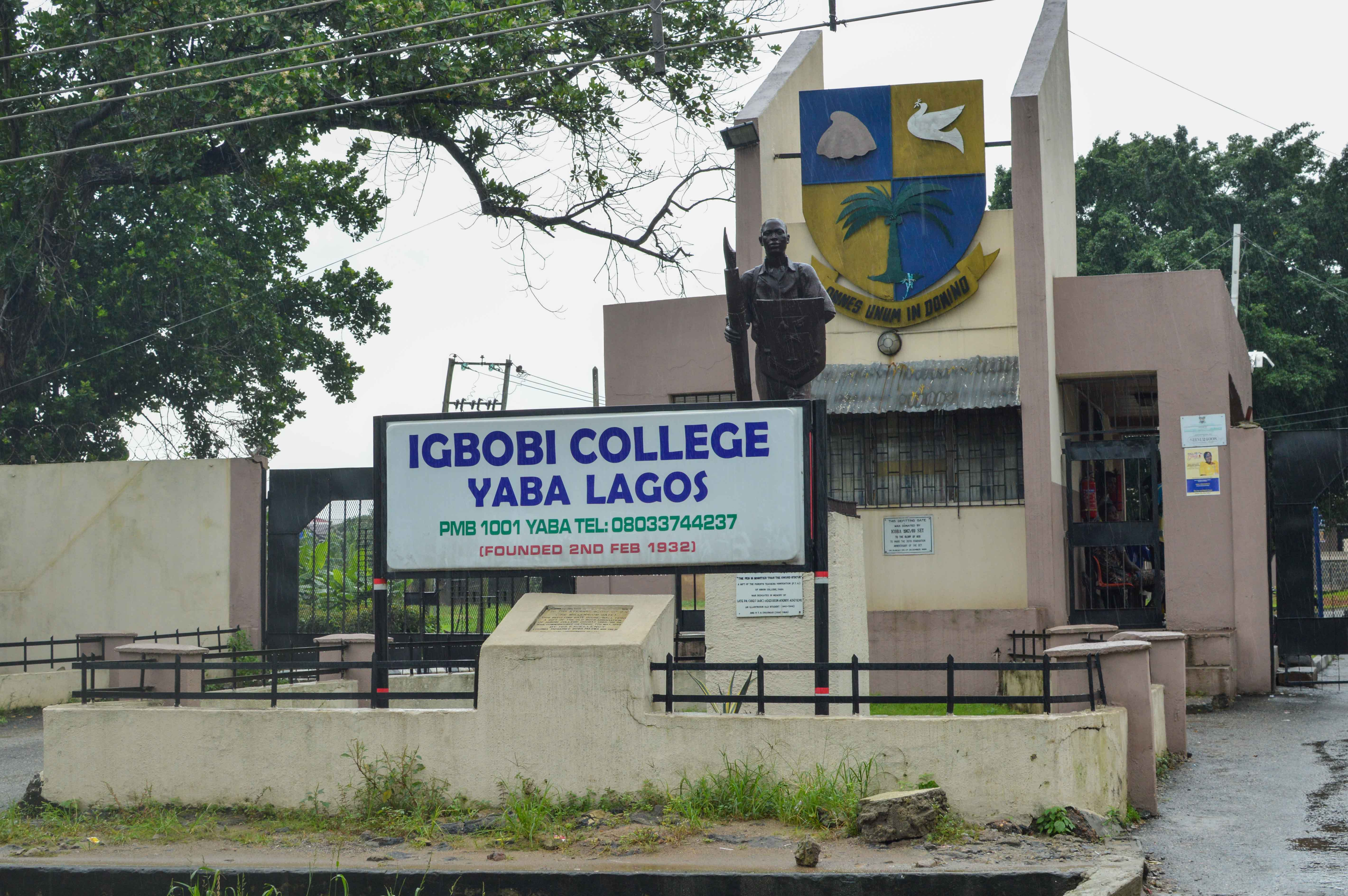

Location
- Yaba, Lagos, Lagos State; Nigeria; 6°31′40″N 3°22′18″E

Information
- School type: Missionary High school
- Motto: Omnes Unum in Domino (All are one in the Lord)
- Religious affiliations: Anglican and Methodist
- Established: 1932 (94 years ago)
- Founder: Anglican and Methodist Churches
- Principal: Reverend Adedotun Akanbi.
- Grades: JSS1–SSS3
- Gender: Boys
- Houses: Aggrey, Freeman, Parker, Townsend
- Colours: Blue, Gold
- Slogan: Up IC
- Nickname: ICY
- Rival: CMS Grammar School, Lagos
- Website: igbobicollege.com

Igbobi College is a college established by the Methodist and Anglican Churches in 1932, in the Yaba suburb of Lagos, Lagos State, South-western Nigeria. It is still on its original site and most of the original buildings are intact. It is one of the oldest colleges in Nigeria, and has been the alma mater of a number of well-known Nigerians. In 2001 the school was returned to its original owners by the Bola Tinubu led Lagos state government.

== Notable alumni ==
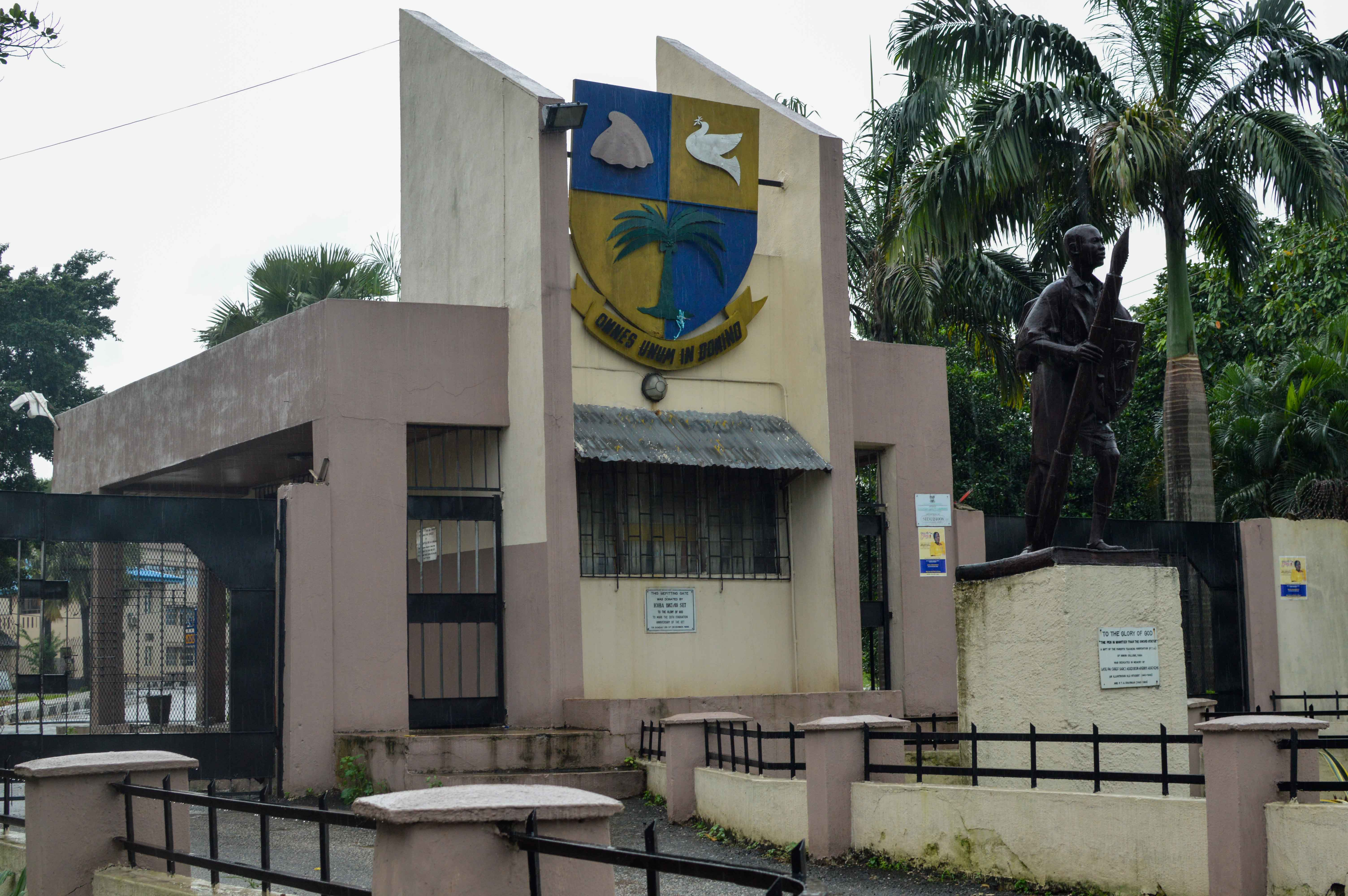
Igbobi college

- Dr Claude Nelson-Williams
- Joseph Adefarasin
- Paul Adefarasin
- Vice Admiral Akintunde Aduwo
- J. F. Ade Ajayi
- Bolaji Akinyemi
- Segun Awolowo
- Subomi Balogun
- Abiodun Baruwa
- G.B.A. Coker
- F.C.O Coker
- Olufemi Elias
- Taslim Olawale Elias
- Olu Falae
- Babatunde Fashola
- Babatunde Fowler
- Femi Gbajabiamila
- Alex Ibru
- Felix Ibru
- Michael Ibru
- Oskar Ibru
- Dosu Joseph
- Femi Kuti
- K. O. Mbadiwe
- Gbolahan Mudasiru
- Yemi Osinbajo
- Bruce Ovbiagele
- Akintunde Sawyerr
- Ernest Shonekan
- Dele Sosimi
- Lanre Tejuosho

== Gallery ==
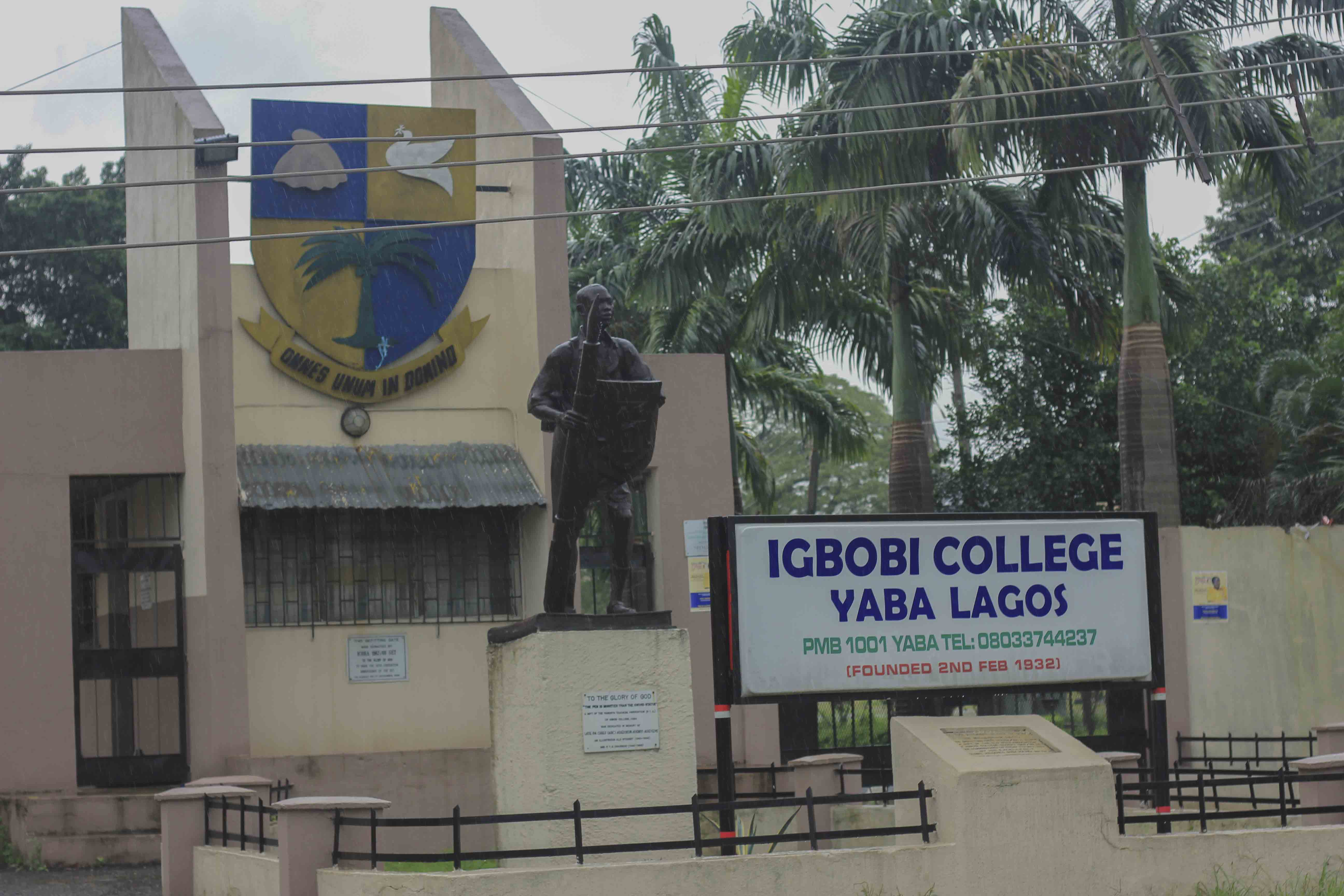

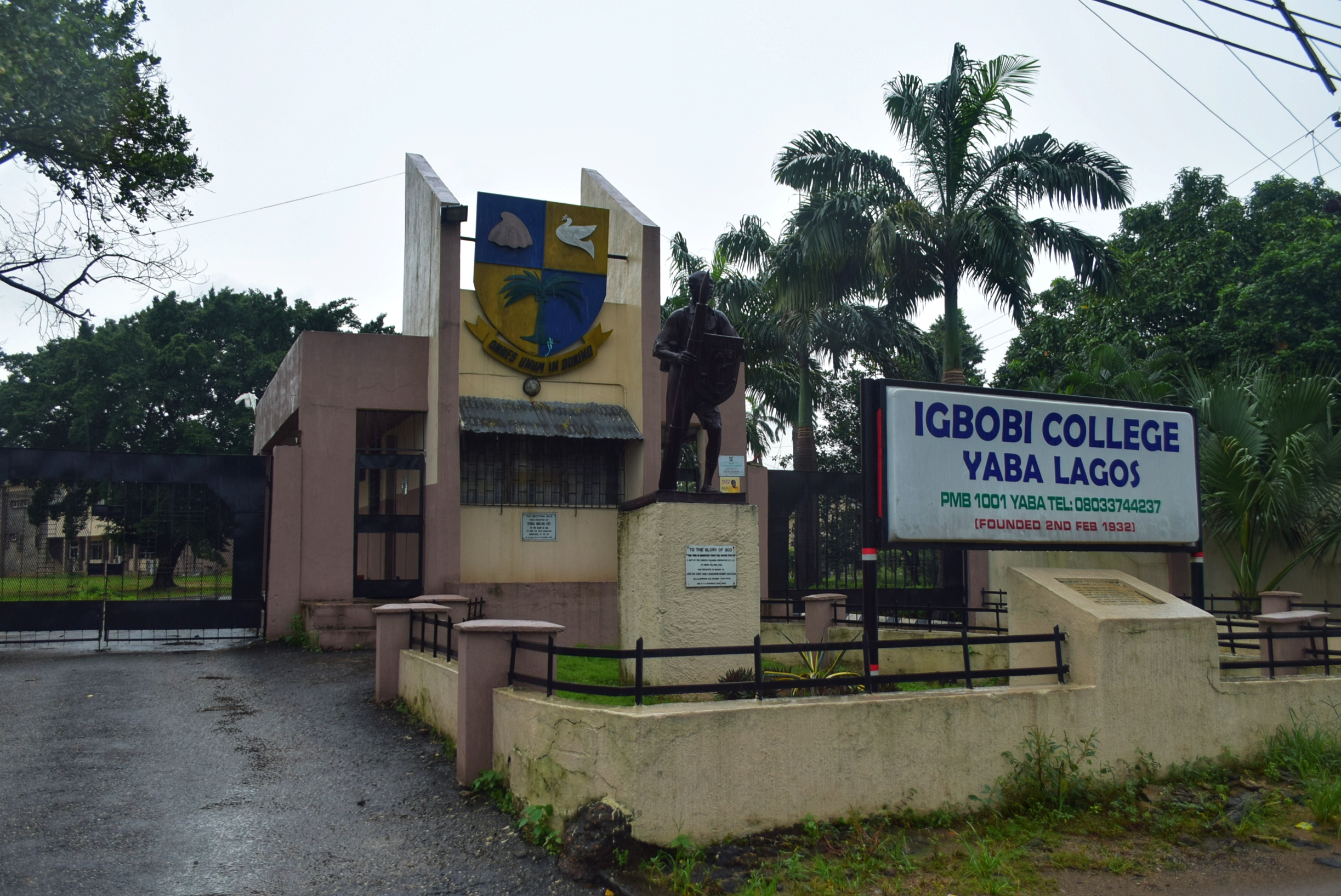

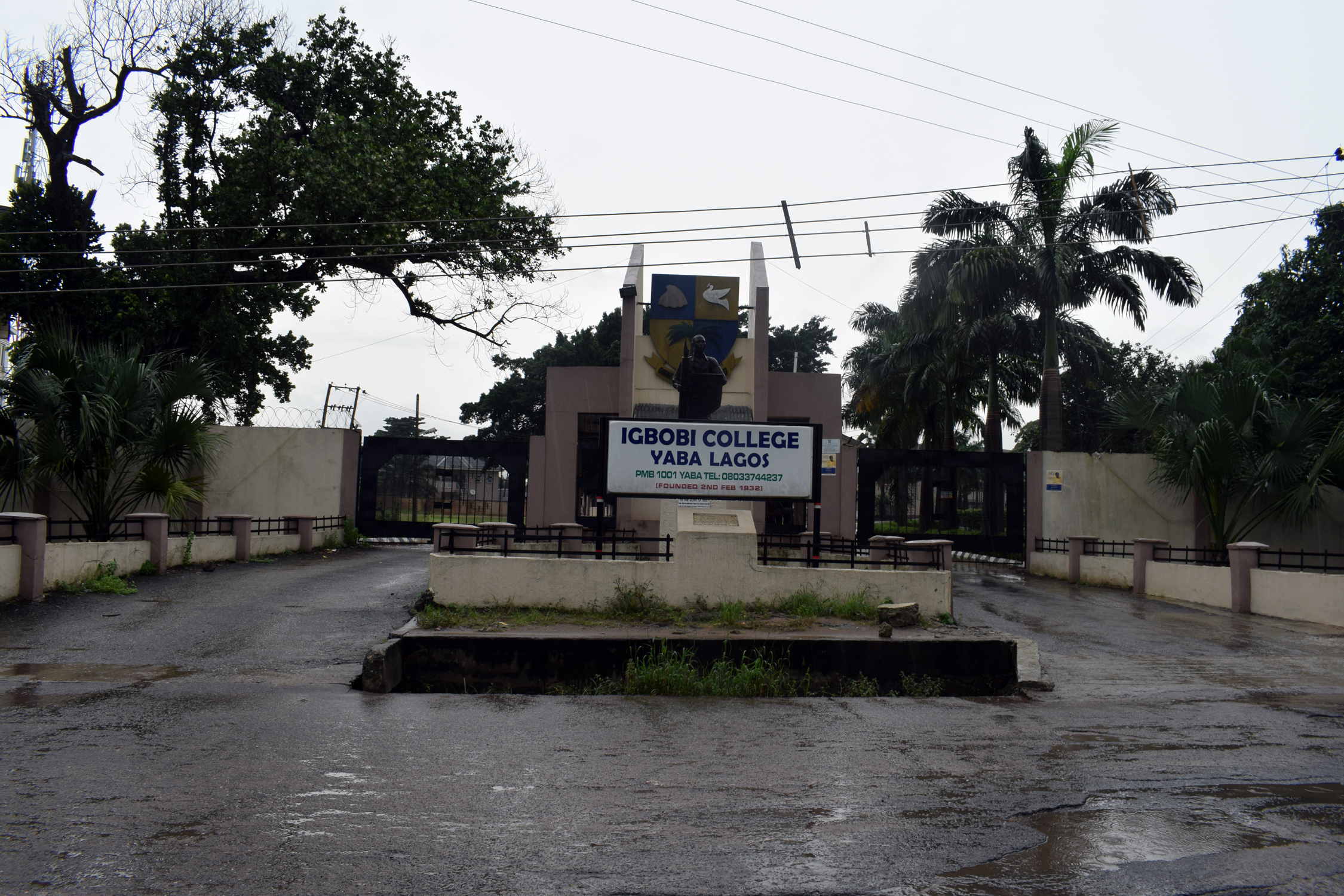
