= Aradel Holdings =

Nigerian energy company

Aradel Holdings Plc
- Type: Public
- Traded as: NGX: ARADEL
- ISIN: NGARADEL0004
- Industry: Oil and gas
- Founded: 25 March 1992; 34 years ago
- Headquarters: Lagos, Nigeria
- Key people: Osten Olorunsola (Chairman); Adegbite Falade (CEO)
- Products: Crude oil, natural gas, refined petroleum products
- Revenue: ▲ ₦581.2 billion (FY 2024)
- Net income: ▲ ₦259.1 billion (FY 2024)
- Number of employees: ~269 (2025)
- Subsidiaries: Aradel Energy Limited; Aradel Gas; Aradel Investments; Aradel Refineries
- Website: aradel.com

Aradel Holdings Plc is a Nigerian integrated energy company with operations spanning the upstream, midstream, and downstream sectors of the oil and gas industry. Following its listing in October 2024, it became the largest oil and gas company on the Nigerian Exchange (NGX) by market capitalisation.

== History ==
Aradel Holdings traces its origins to Midas Drilling Fund, incorporated on 25 March 1992 as Nigeria's first integrated oil and gas investment company. In November 1996, the company was renamed Niger Delta Exploration and Production Plc (NDEP), under which it developed its flagship Ogbele Marginal Field in Rivers State.

In 2010, the company commissioned Nigeria's first mini refinery at the Ogbele Field, followed by the Ogbele Gas Processing Plant in 2012, enabling it to eliminate routine gas flaring at the facility. In May 2023, the company rebranded to its current name, Aradel Holdings Plc, to reflect its evolution into a fully integrated energy group.

In October 2024, Aradel Holdings listed its shares on the main board of the Nigerian Exchange via introduction, with its stock closing its first day of trading at ₦772.90 per share and adding approximately ₦3.4 trillion to the exchange's total market capitalisation. The listing was subsequently awarded NGX Listing of the Year 2024 by the Nigerian Exchange Group.

In December 2024, Aradel acquired a 5.14% minority equity stake in Chappal Energies Mauritius Limited, a company with interests in multiple Nigerian oil blocks, in a move aimed at broadening the group's asset base.

== Operations ==
Aradel Holdings operates as a fully integrated energy group through four primary subsidiaries:

- Aradel Energy Limited (100% owned) — the primary operating subsidiary and designated operator of the Ogbele (PML 14), Omerelu (PPL 247), Olo, and Olo West Marginal Fields, as well as a joint venture interest in OPL 227.
- Aradel Gas — pursues investment and development opportunities in the natural gas sector.
- Aradel Investments — holds and manages the group's non-oil and gas assets.
- Aradel Refineries — an independent midstream entity managing the group's refining operations.

=== Ogbele Marginal Field ===
The Ogbele Marginal Field, located in Rivers State, is Aradel's flagship upstream asset, covering approximately 22.53 square kilometres within Oil Mining Lease (OML) 54. Cumulative production from the field surpassed 19 million barrels of crude oil and 90 billion standard cubic feet (bscf) of associated gas as of 2020. The company evacuates crude via the Trans Niger Pipeline (TNP) and an Alternative Crude Evacuation (ACE) system commissioned to reduce pipeline losses and improve export reliability.

=== Omerelu Field ===
In May 2024, Aradel achieved first oil at the Omerelu Field (PPL 247) through the re-entry of Well 2ST, diversifying the group's production base beyond Ogbele for the first time.

== Financial performance ==
Aradel Holdings – Selected Financial Results
Year	Revenue (₦ billion)	Profit after tax (₦ billion)	Notes
2023	221.1	53.7	Pre-listing year
2024	581.2	259.1	+162.8% revenue; +382.1% PAT
2025 (unaudited)	697.3	397.9	+20% revenue; +55% PAT

In its 2024 full-year audited results, Aradel reported revenue of ₦581.2 billion (approximately US$393 million), a 162.8% year-on-year increase, driven primarily by a surge in export crude oil revenues which accounted for over 64% of total revenue. Profit after tax grew 382.1% to ₦259.1 billion, with earnings per share of ₦59.35. The board declared a final dividend of ₦22.00 per share for the financial year.

For the full year 2025 (unaudited), Aradel reported revenue of ₦697.3 billion and profit after tax of ₦397.9 billion, representing approximately 55% profit growth year-on-year, supported by higher crude oil and gas production volumes across its expanded asset portfolio.

== Sustainability ==
Aradel eliminated routine gas flaring at its Ogbele facility in 2012 following the commissioning of the Ogbele Gas Processing Plant. In February 2026, the company attained ISO 45001:2018 certification for occupational health and safety management systems. The company has over 21,000 shareholders and maintains a policy of consistent annual dividend payments spanning more than 15 years.

== Awards ==
- NGX Listing of the Year 2024 — Nigerian Exchange Group
- Outstanding Oil & Gas Company of the Year 2025 — Energy Times Awards
- Best Full-Field Integrated Operator — Nigeria International Energy Summit (NIES) 2026
