= Maiden Alex Ibru =

Nigerian media executive

Lady Maiden Ibru MFR
- Born: Maiden Thomopulos; November 20, 1949 (age 76); Sapele, Nigeria
- Education: University of Ibadan (BA); American University (MA)
- Occupation: Media executive
- Organization: The Guardian
- Title: Chair and Publisher
- Spouse: Alex Ibru
- Children: 5 (Anita, Ose, Toke, Tive, and Uvie)

The Lady Maiden Ibru, MFR, née Thomopulos (born 20 November 1949) is a Nigerian media executive, newspaper proprietor and high society matriarch. She is the Chair and Publisher of the Guardian Newspapers.

== Early life and education ==
Maiden Alex Ibru was born in Sapele, Delta State, on November 20, 1949. Her father is Mr. Aristotelis Thomopulos who is a Greek man that settled in Nigeria. Her mother a Nigerian women is Mrs. Hannah Thomopulos (née Omaghomi) a granddaughter of Olomu of Koko, the Governor-General of the area in the 1880s. She had elementary education at the Children's Home School, Ibadan. Her secondary education was at Queen's School, Ede.

She proceeded to the University of Ibadan where she got a combined honours degree in English and Theatre studies in 1972. She also attended American University in Washington D.C and obtained a master's degree in Communications and media studies in 1974. She and her late husband Alex Ibru have five children, namely: Anita, Ose, Toke, Tive and Uvie.

== Career ==
Maiden Alex-Ibru is the wife of chief Alex Ibru, who was founder and Chairman of Guardian Press Limited, the holding company that owns The Guardian (Nigeria) and other media associated companies. The Guardian newspaper was set up in 1983. In 2019, Maiden Ibru was appointed the Chairman of Guardian Press Limited. By this appointment, she also became the Publisher and Chief Executive Officer of The Guardian. Before her appointment as publisher and CEO of The Guardian, she was Chief Executive Officer of Guardian Press Limited for 11 years. She was elected President of the Newspaper Proprietors' Association of Nigeria in 2025.

Maiden Alex Ibru is also a director of Trinity Foundation, a philanthropic foundation founded by her late husband Alexander Ibru. The foundation provides financial and infrastructural support to institutions and civil society organisations which promote democratic and open society principles. It has donated to the Anglican Church in Nigeria, and built an Ecumenical Centre in Agbarha-Otor.

== Recognition ==
In 2007 the Greek Parliament conferred on Maiden Alex Ibru the “Golden Cross of Welfare”, and in 2012 the Greek Orthodox Patriarchate of Alexandria conferred on her the "Ladyship" title of the “cross of saint mark”. She received the Special Philanthropy award of the Federal Republic of Nigeria (SP FRN) from the Committee Encouraging Corporate Philanthropy (CECP-Nig). In September 2014, she was awarded the National honour Member of the Order of the Federal Republic (MFR).

On her 70th birthday, celebrated in November 2019, President Buhari sent her warm greetings, praising her leadership for the Guardian newspaper and her work with the Trinity Foundation. According to President Buhari, Maiden Ibru's outstanding contributions to improving the lives of many, especially the girl-child and underprivileged families, deserved spotlighting and commendation.

== See also ==
- Alex Ibru
