= AS Racine F.C. =

Nigerian football club

AS Racines
- Full name: AS Racines Football Club
- Founded: 1998; 28 years ago
- President: Emmanuel Ibru
- Coach: Victor Agali
- League: Nigeria National League
- Website: www.asracines.com/en/

AS Racines Football Club is a professional football club based in the city of Lagos, Nigeria. The team competes in the Nigeria National League, the second level of the Nigerian football league system.

== Background ==
Founded in 1998, the club has focused on grassroots football and youth development and has served as a feeder team to local and international clubs. It is owned by Nigerian businessman Emmanuel Ibru, who served on the board of the Nigeria Football Federation.

== Notable players ==
- Osaze Odemwingie
- Brown Ideye
- Fegor Ogude
- Onyekachi Okonkwo
- Olubayo Adefemi
- Dominic Chatto
- Leke James

== Honours ==
- Delta FA Cup: 2007
- Lagos FA Cup: 2014
