= Olomu =

Kingdom in Delta State, Nigeria

Coordinates: 7°12′N 4°28′E

Olomu Kingdom
- Kingdom
- Location within Nigeria
- Country: Nigeria
- State: Delta State
- LGA: Ughelli South
- Seat: Otu-Jeremi

Government
  - Type: Monarchy
  - Body: Olomu Traditional Council
  - King: His Royal Majesty Albert Akpomudje SAN, Eyavwien-Alaka 1
- Time zone: West Africa Time

Olomu is a Kingdom in Ughelli South in Delta State, Nigeria. Olomu is one of the oldest Urhobo kingdoms of the Niger Delta region.

== Monarch ==
The paramount ruler of Olomu is the Ovie/king known as Ohworode (big person) R' Olomu. The current king is His Royal Majesty Albert Akpomudje SAN, Eyavwien-Alaka 1. He is also the current chairman of the Nigerian Body of Benchers.

== Leadership ==
The Ohworode, Otota and Akpile positions is rotated among the three ruling houses of Olomu Kingdom. They're the Uhurhie Ruling House, Oghoro Ruling House and Eyanvwien Ruling House. Whenever the Ohworode (king) passes on, the Otota (Prime Minister) becomes Ohworode, while the Akpile ascends to Otota. The house of the late Ohworode in turn produces the Akpile.

== Clans ==
The kingdom has over 15 clans, including:

- Agbon
- Akperhe
- Aloba
- Ogoni
- Okpe
- Ophori
- Okpavorhe
- Oguname
- Okpare
- Ovwodokpokpo
- Oviri-Olomu
- Ovwor
- Ovworigbala
- Ofuomanefe
- Umolo
