= Agbara-Otor =

Town in Delta State, Nigeria

Agbarha-Otor
- Location in Nigeria
- Coordinates: 5°53′N 6°06′E
- Country: Nigeria
- State: Delta State

Government
  - Type: Monarchy

Agbarha Otor (Agbarha-Otor) is a town and one of the Urhobo kingdoms in Ughelli North Local Government Area of Delta State. The town is home to the wealthy and renowned Ibru Family. Besides primary and secondary schools, Agbarha-Otor has a private university, namely Michael and Cecilia Ibru University and a private Airstrip built in 1972 by Michael Ibru. It also houses the 222 Battalion of the Nigerian Army and the now moribund SuperBru, a malt producing company.

== Villages in Agbara-Otor ==
- Agbaide
- Agba
- Agbarha-Otor
- Aghalokpe
- Awirhe
- Edjeba
- Edjekemevor
- Edoide
- Ehwahwa
- Esemagidi
- Etefe
- Gana
- Idjerhe
- Ihwredju
- Imiroje
- Oghara
- Ogorode
- Okpara
- Omakoghwre
- Omavovwe
- Omovwodoirhibo
- Ophori
- Oteri
- Otokutu
- Owevwe
- Ovwodoavwaren
- Ovwodogbe
- Ighwrerai
- Saniko
- Ujovwre
