= Adenike =

- Pronunciation: /ā.dé.nĩ́.kɛ́/
- Gender: Female
- Language: Yoruba

Origin
- Origin: Yoruba
- Meaning: "The crown is to be cared for"
- Region of origin: South-west Nigeria

Other names
- Variant forms: Adenike; Adenike

AdenikeAdenike is a feminine given name of Yoruba origin, commonly used in Nigeria. The name is derived from three Yoruba components: “Ade” (crown or royalty), “Ni” (have or own), and “Ike” (care or esteem). Together, Adenike translates to "the crown is to be cared for or treasured." Morphologically, it is written as adé-ní-ìkẹ́ and is pronounced with the tonal combination Adéníìkẹ́.

== Notable people with the given name ==
- Adenike Akinsemolu –Nigerian academic and social entrepreneur.
- Adenike Osofisan –Nigerian academic.
- Adenike Grange –Nigerian politician.
- Adenike Oladosu –Nigerian climate activist.
- Adenike Oyetunde (born 1986) Nigerian media personality
- Adenike Olawuyi (born 2004) –Nigerian basketball player.
- Adenike Oladiji (born 1968) Nigerian academic.
