= Fuwape =

Fùwàpẹ́
- Gender: Male
- Language: Yoruba

Origin
- Origin: Nigerian
- Meaning: One whose character endures for a long time.
- Region of origin: South West, Nigeria

Other names
- Variant form: Afùwàpẹ́

Fùwàpẹ́ audio is a Nigerian surname of Yoruba origin, typically bestowed upon males. It means "One whose character endures for a long time.". The name Fùwàpẹ́ is distinctive, carrying a strong and meaningful undertone. The name Fùwàpẹ́ is common among the Abeokuta and Ogun people of the Southwest, Nigeria. The diminutive form is Afùwàpẹ́.

== Notable individuals with the name ==
- Ibiyinka A. Fuwape (born 1962), Nigerian physicist and academic
- Joseph Fuwape (born 1957), Nigerian academic
