= The Polytechnic, Ibadan =

Institution of higher learning in Ibadan, Oyo State, Nigeria

Coordinates: 7°26′04″N 3°53′06″E

- Ise loogun ise
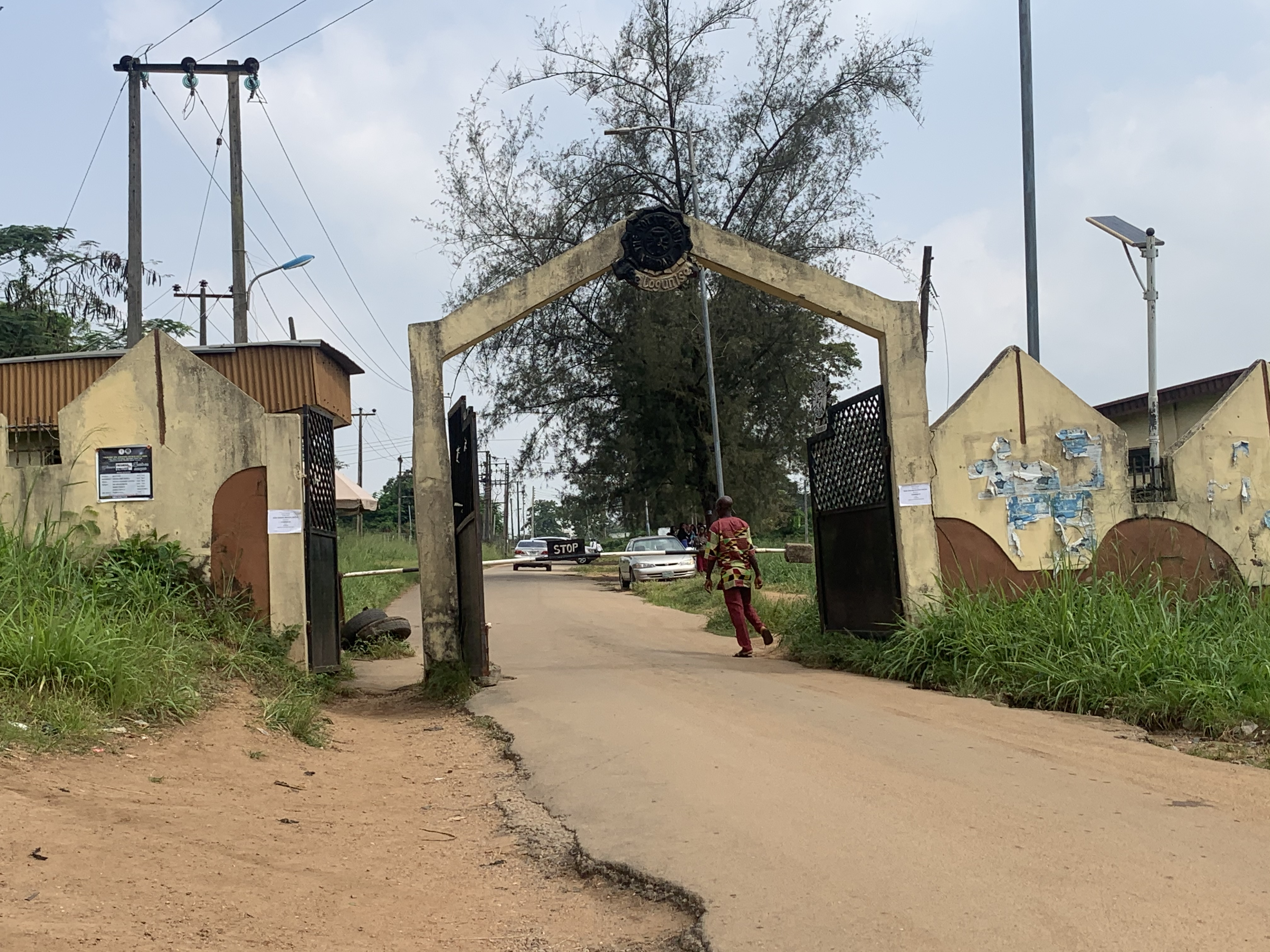
- Type: Public polytechnic
- Established: 1970; 56 years ago
- Rector: Dr. Taiwo Abideen Lasisi
- Location: Ibadan, Nigeria
- Campus: Urban
- Website: www.polyibadan.edu.ng

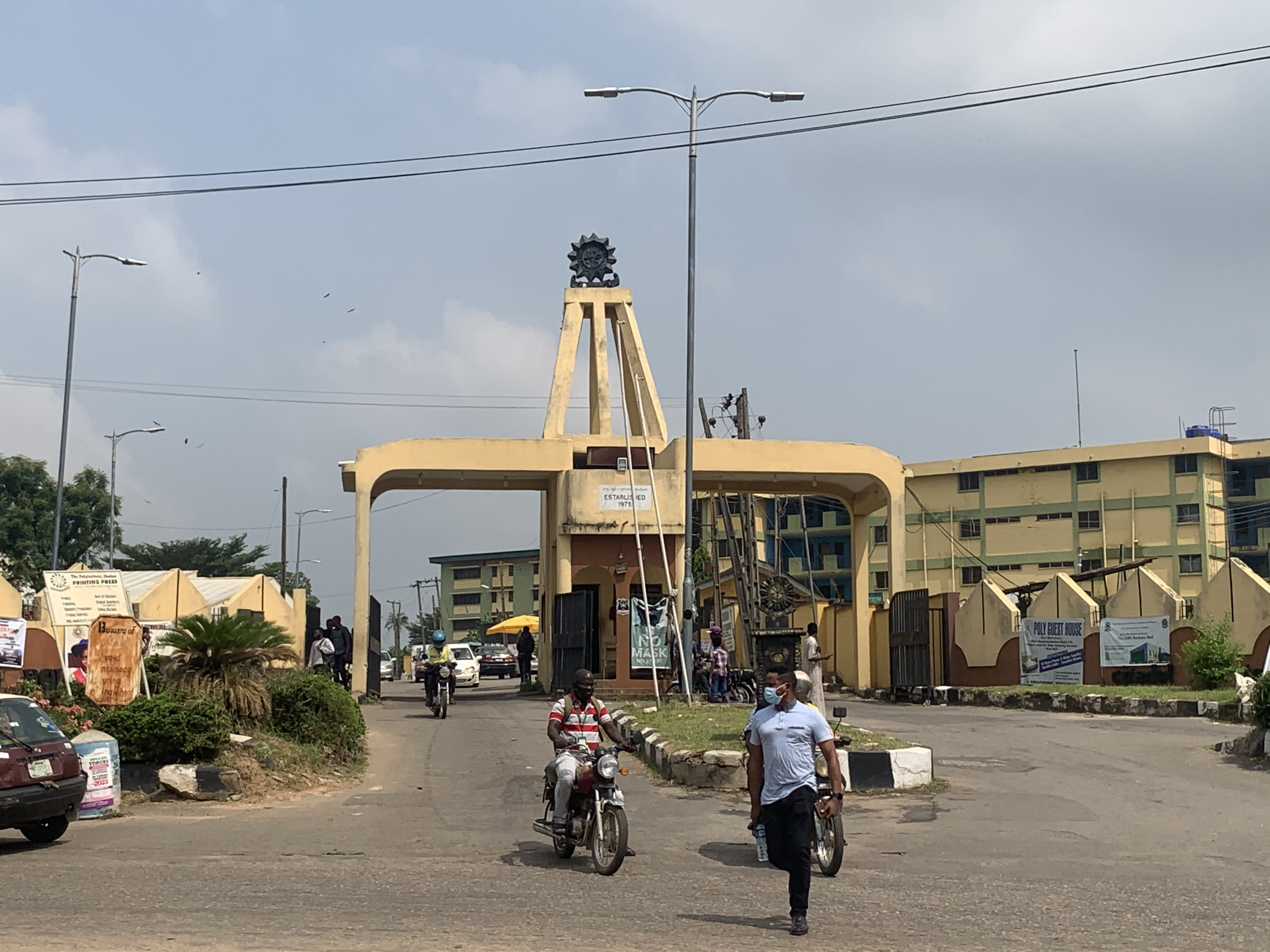
The Polytechnic, Ibadan Entrance Gate

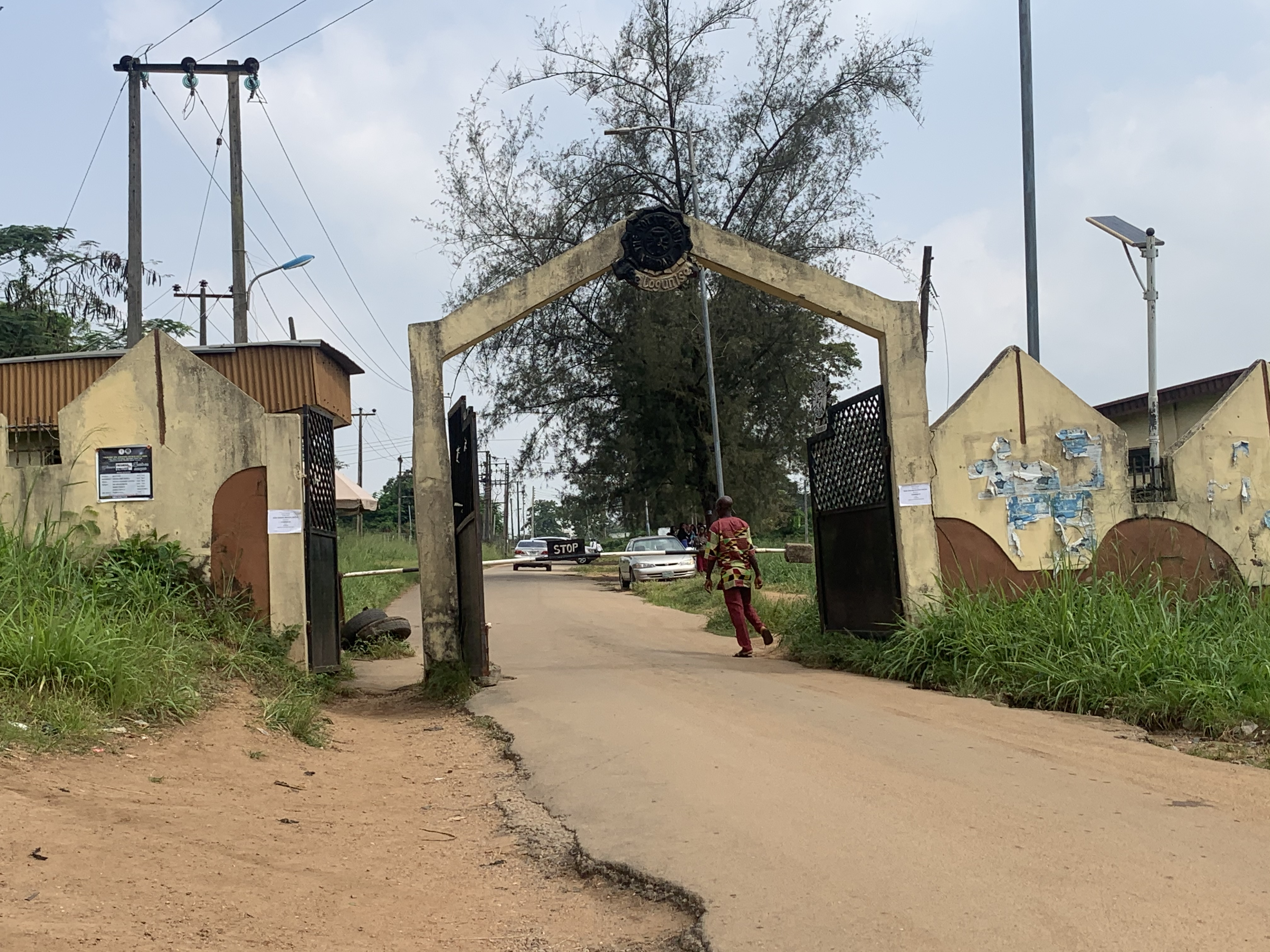
The Polytechnic, Ibadan Exit Gate

The Polytechnic, Ibadan (also called Poly Ibadan) is an institution of higher learning in Ibadan, Oyo State, Nigeria. Founded in August 1970, Poly Ibadan is similar to other polytechnics in Nigeria. The institution was founded to offer an alternative form of higher education, with a specific focus on acquiring technical skills distinct from traditional universities. The vocational and skills acquisition center aims to guarantee that students acquire mastery in a skill before graduating, while also offering skills training to the local community. Poly Ibadan is also well known for its unique slogan written in Yoruba language as Ise loogun ise which means "Work is the antidote for poverty", a classical Yoruba adage which stresses that hard work is the way out of poverty.

== Curriculum ==
The institution offers a wide range of specialized short courses for the purpose of improving the vocational capabilities of technical and commercial workers. Poly Ibadan awards Ordinary National Diploma (OND), Higher National Diploma (HND), Post Graduate Diploma (PGD) and other professional certificates to its graduates. It also provides opportunities for creative development and research related to the needs of teaching, industry and the business community.

== Rector ==
Prof. Kazeem A. Adebiyi is the former rector of Polytechnic, Ibadan. He attended Oniyere Grammar School, Orita Aperin, Ibadan. He furthered his education at The Polytechnic, Ibadan, earning a National Diploma (ND) in Mechanical Engineering in 1989, where he emerged as the Best Graduating Student in ND Mechanical Engineering.

=== New Rector ===
On 28 March 2024, Governor Seyi Makinde of Oyo state appointed Dr. Taiwo Abideen Lasisi as the new acting Rector of the polytechnic Ibadan.

=== Registrar ===
Oyo State Government has appointed Dr. Taiwo Olajide Sherifat as the Registrar of The Polytechnic, Ibadan, while Mr. Adegbola Abiodun Kolawole has been similarly appointed as the Bursar of The Polytechnic and Mr. Osunrinade Olukunle Akinbola has appointed as the Chief Librarian of The Polytechnic .

== Administration ==
The current principal members of the polytechnic administration are:

People
Office	Holder
[Visitor]	Oluseyi Abiodun Makinde
Ag. Rector	Dr. Taiwo Abideen Lasisi
Deputy Rector	Mrs Olaide Oluwatoyin Salawu
Ag. Registrar	Mrs Olufunto Abimbola Ojewunmi
Ag Bursar	Mr David Olukola Taiwo
Director of Works	Engineer Adeniran Abiodun
Ag.Chief Librarian	Mr Moronkola Munir Sanni

== Library ==
The Main Campus of the Polytechnic Library system accommodates 292 readers, with three reading rooms each in the North and South Campuses providing an additional 527 seating spaces. In total, the Polytechnic Library on the Main Campus offers 819 reading spaces. The existing collection comprises approximately 79,500 volumes, and the Library subscribes to around 200 journal titles. There is a substantial number of magazines, news magazines, newsletters, and both foreign and local newspapers.

== Academic programmes ==
The polytechnic runs mainly National Diploma (ND) and Higher National Diploma (HND) programmes in the following on full-time, part-time or sandwich basis.

== Faculties and their Departments ==
Faculty of Engineering

- Civil Engineering
- Electrical Engineering
- Mechanical Engineering
- Computer Engineering
- Mechatronics Engineering
- Metallurgical Engineering Technology

Faculty of Sciences

- Science Laboratory Technology
- Biology and Microbiology
- Pharmaceutical Technology
- Chemistry
- Library and Information Science
- Physics with Electronics
- Geology
- Computer Science
- Statistics

Faculty of Environmental Studies

- Architecture
- Art, Design and printing technology
- Post Urban and Regional Planning
- Estate Management and valuation
- Photography Technology
- Quantity Surveying
- Building Technology
- Tourism management technology
- Land Surveying and Geoinformatics

Faculty of Financial And Management Studies

- Accountancy
- Banking and Finance
- Insurance
- Taxation
- Cooperative economics and management

Faculty of Business and Communication Sciences

- Mass Communication
- Marketing
- Business Administration
- Office Technology Management
- Procurement and Supply chain management
- Local Government and Development Studies
- Public Administration

== Ranking ==
The polytechnic Ibadan is ranked 164th in the public institution in Nigeria.

== Notable alumni ==
- Dapo Lam Adesina (born 1978), Member of House of Representative for Ibadan North East/South Federal Constituency
- Rauf Aregbesola (born 1957), Nigerian politician, former governor of Osun State and former Minister of interior.
- Adebiyi Daramola (1958–2022), Nigerian academic and former vice chancellor of the Federal University of Technology Akure.
- Adeyeye Enitan Ogunwusi (born 1974), Traditional monarch of Ilé-Ifè, Osun State, Nigeria.
- Ayo Fayose (born 1960), Nigerian politician, former governor of Ekiti State
- Bishop Francis Wale Oke (born 1956), author, Christian leader and televangelist
- Oluwole Omofemi (born 1988), Nigerian painter, known for painting the last commissioned painting of Queen Elizabeth II before her demise.

== Gallery ==
Campus of The Polytechnic, Ibadan

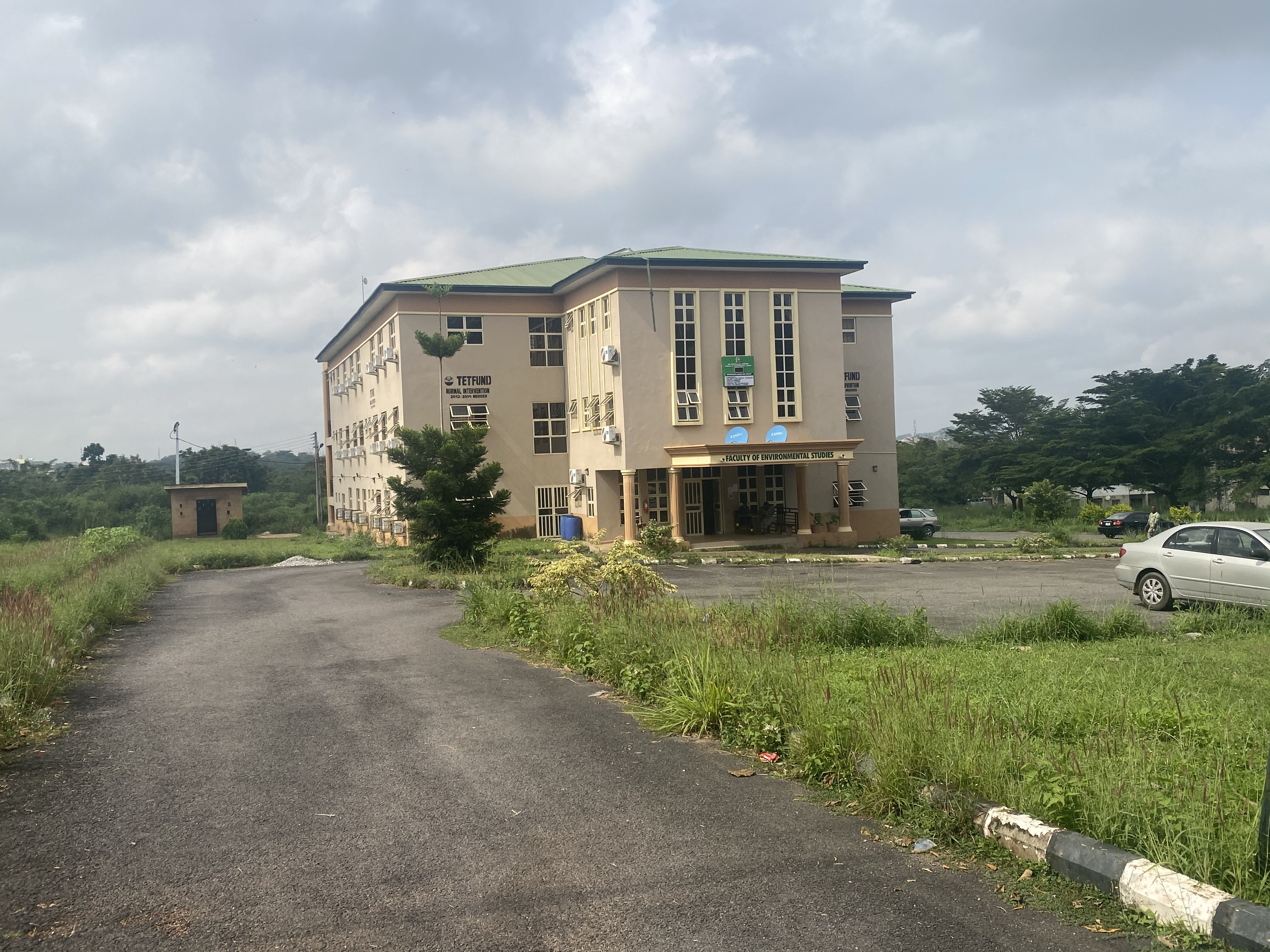
Faculty of Environmental Studies

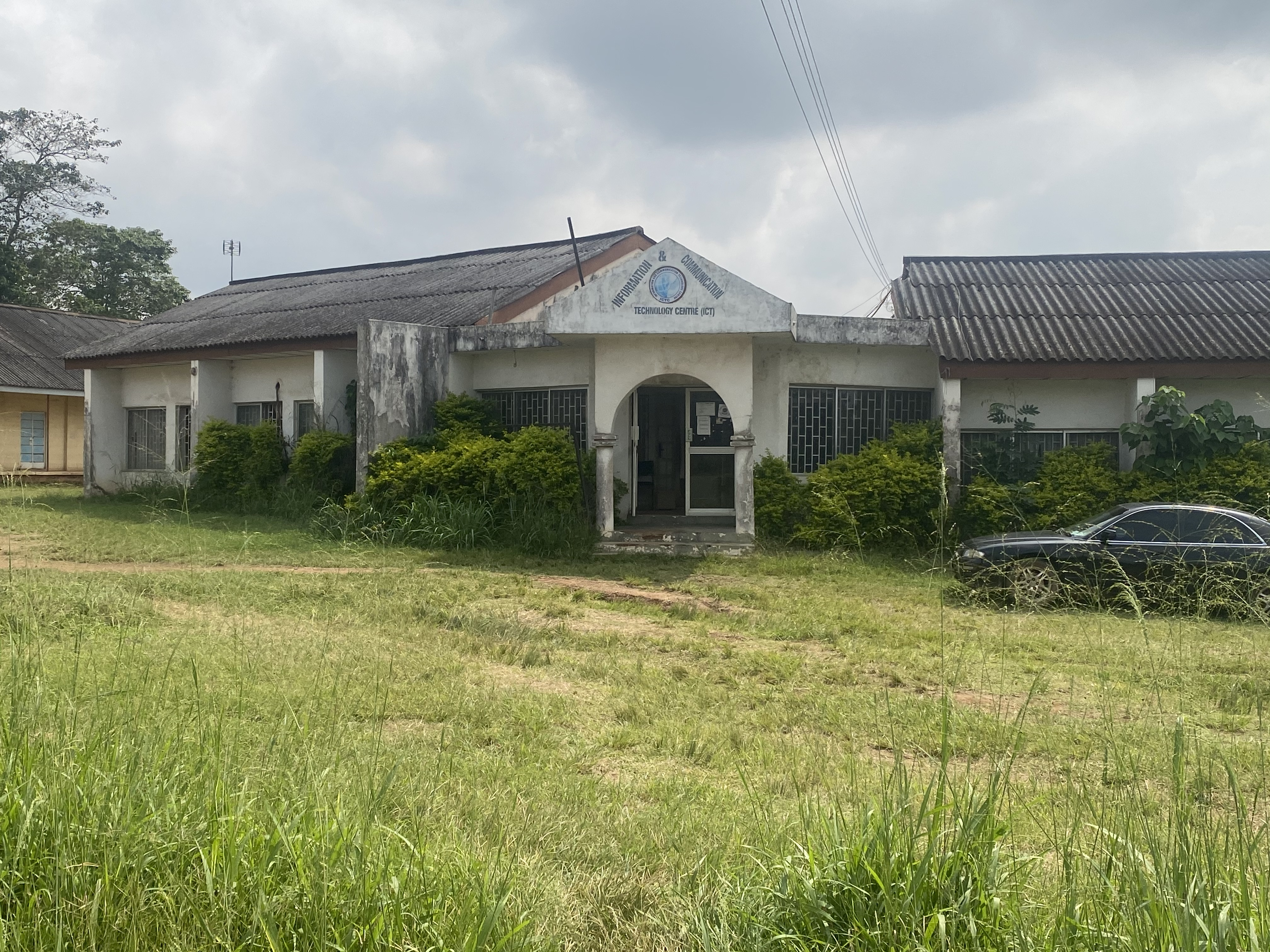
Information and Communication Technology Centre (ICT)

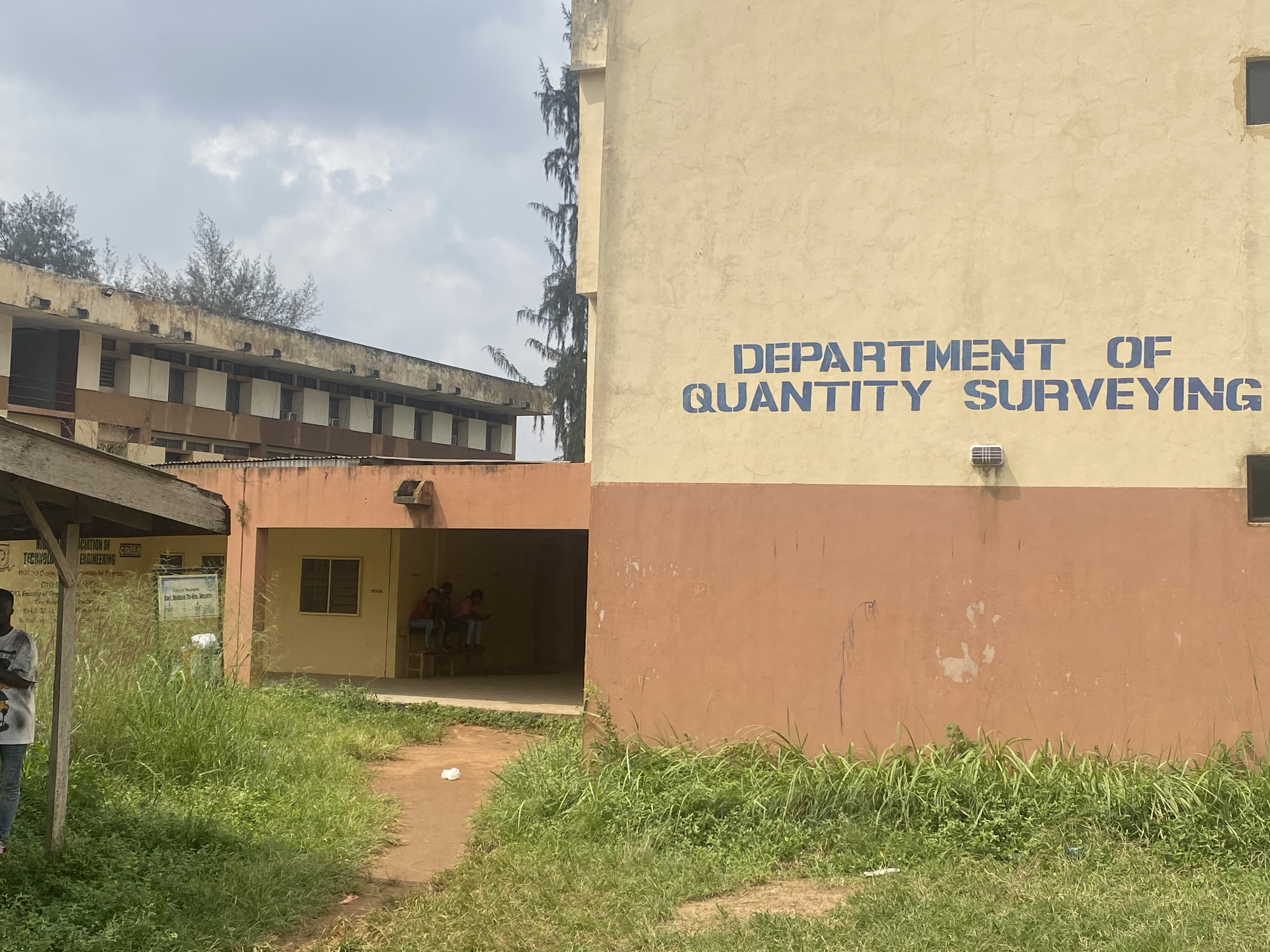
Department of Quantity Surveying

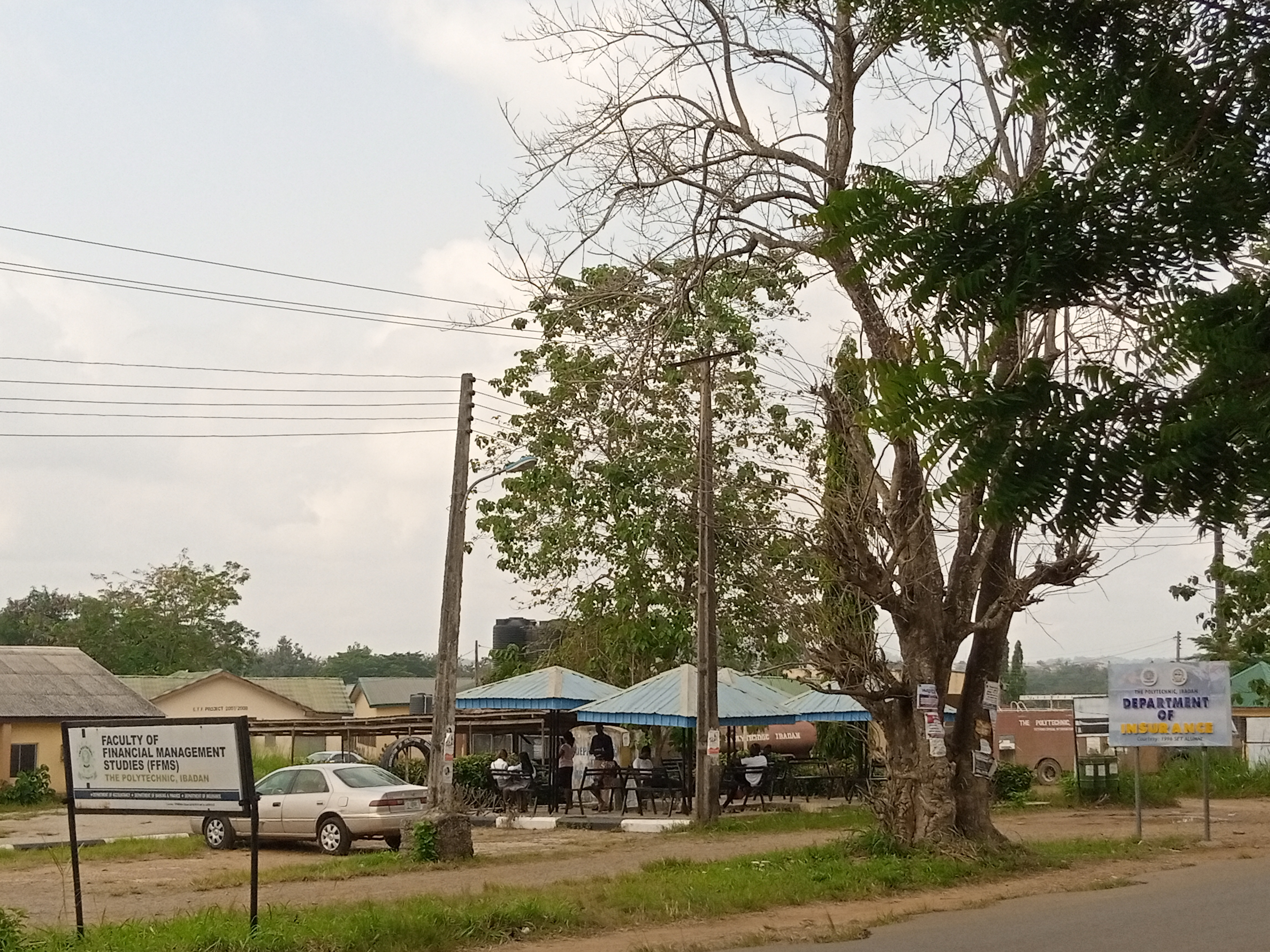
Faculty of Financial Management Studies

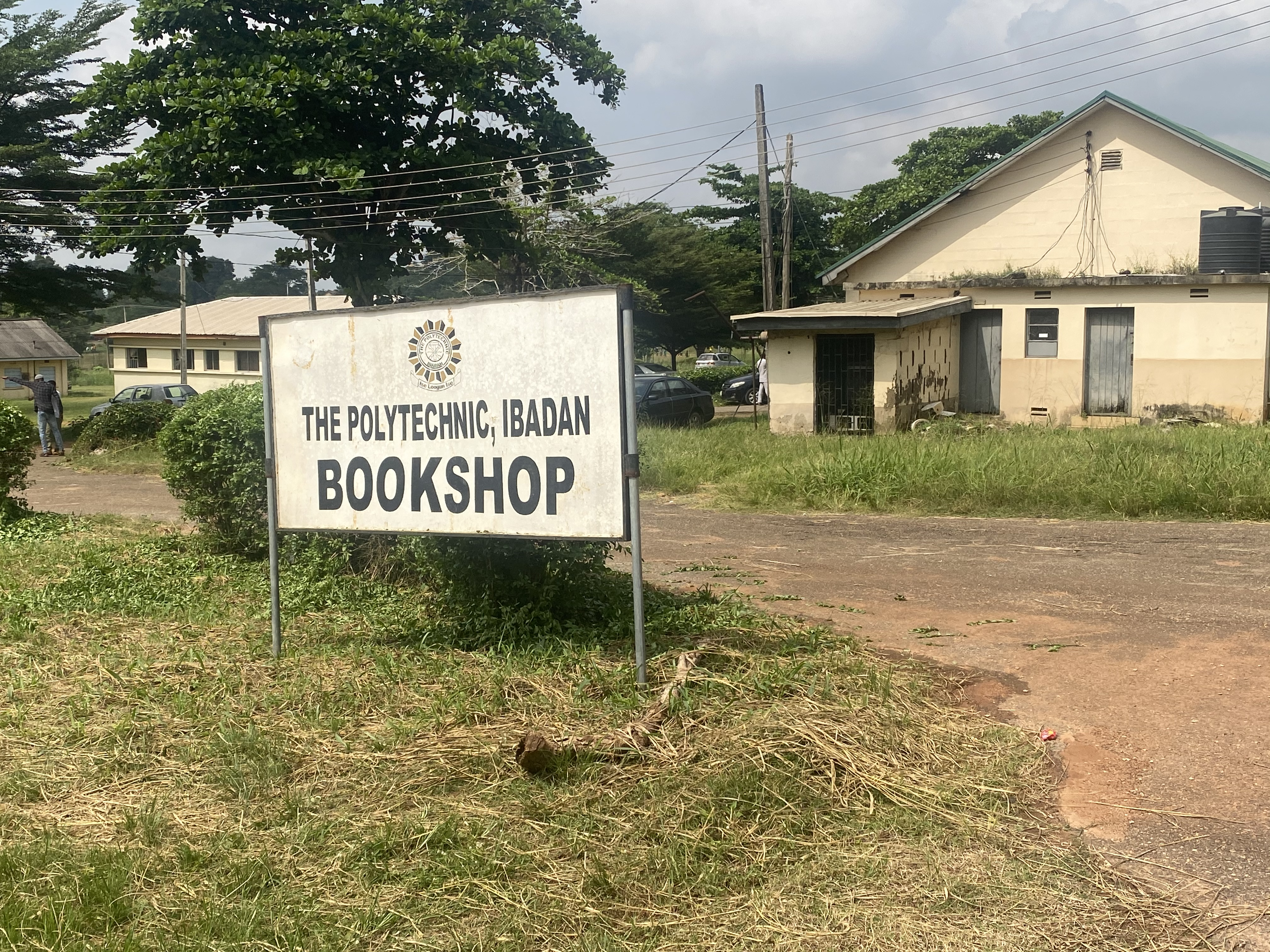
Signpost of the bookshop

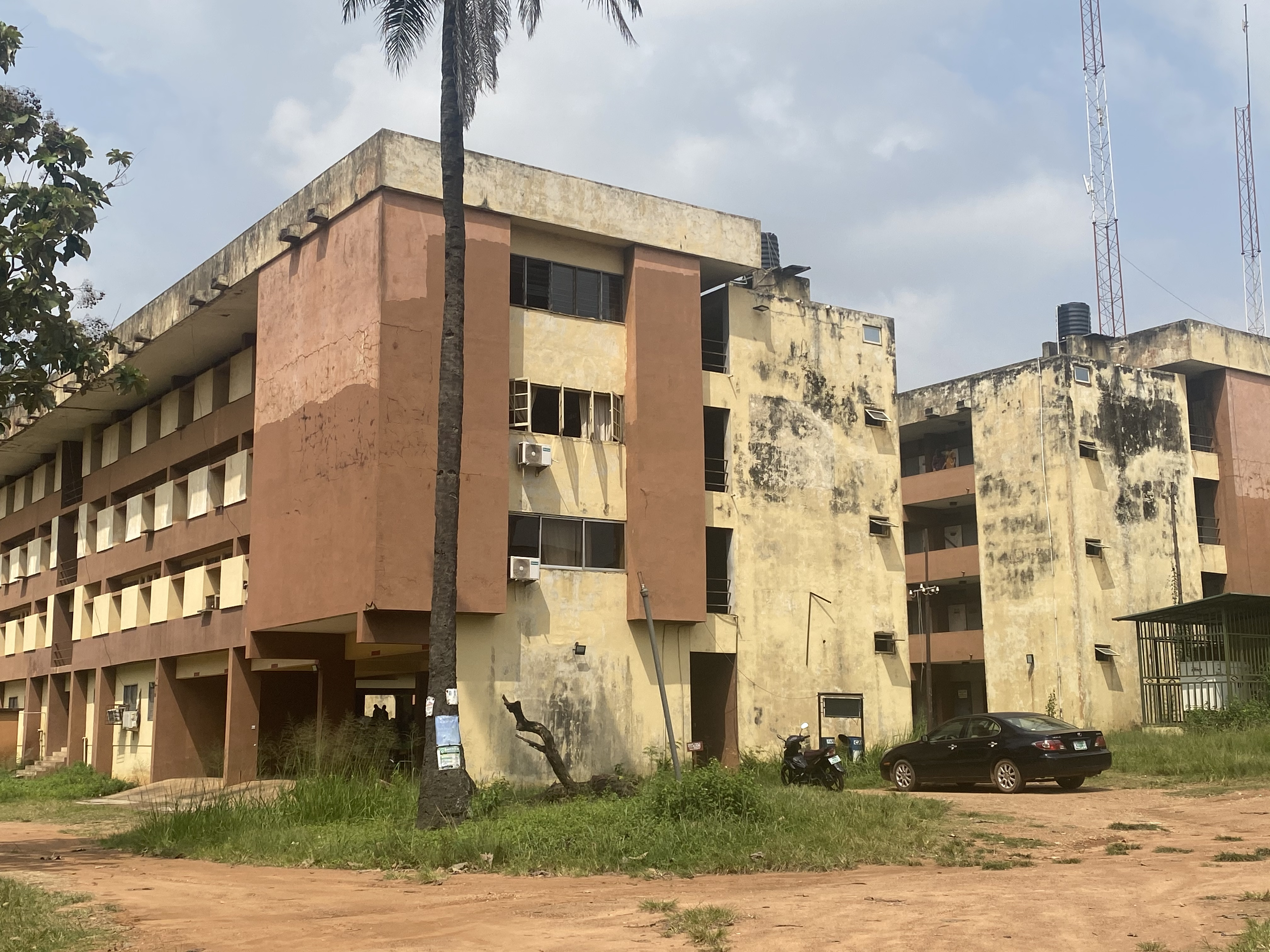
Mechanical Engineering Building

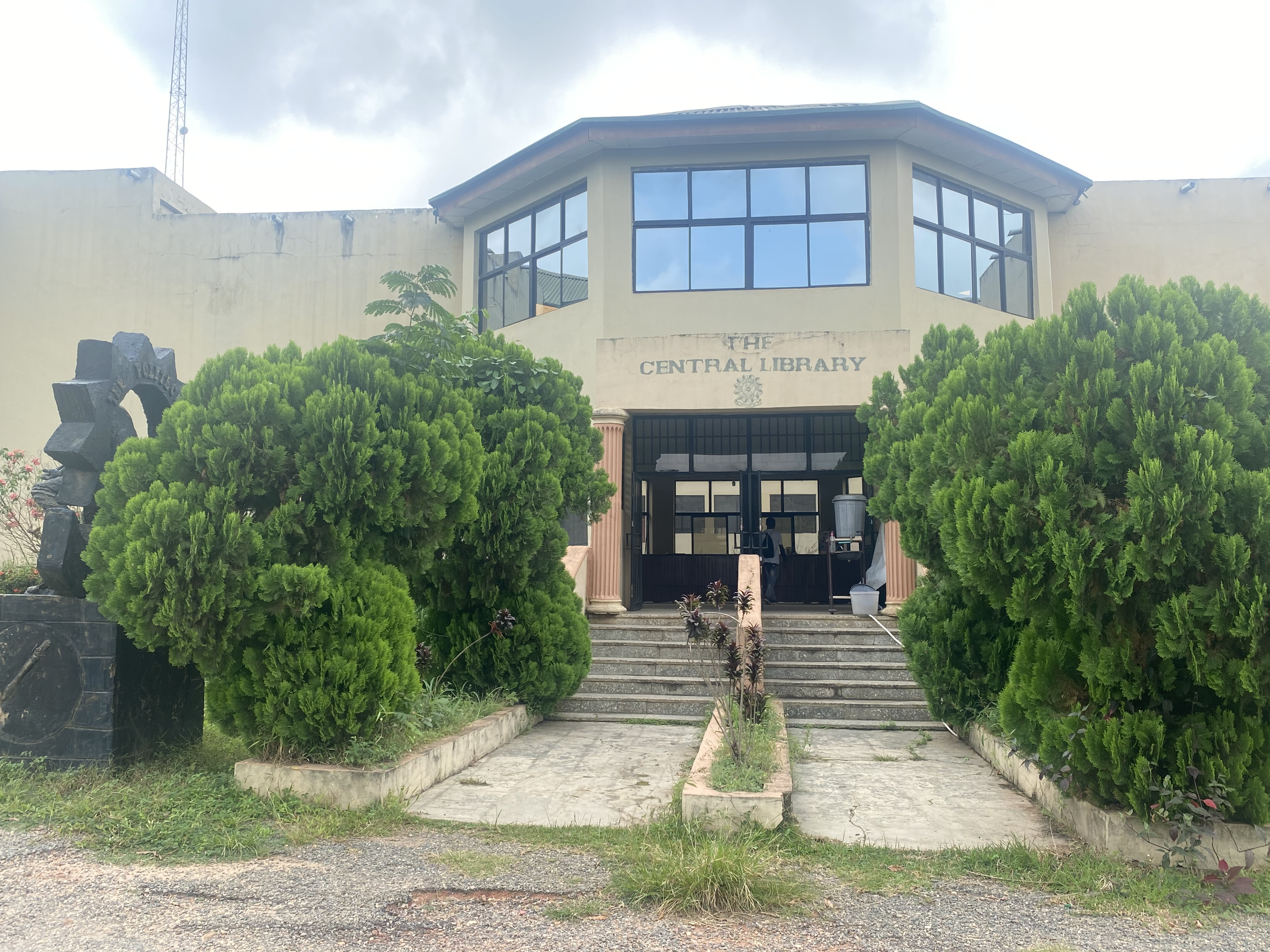
The Central Library

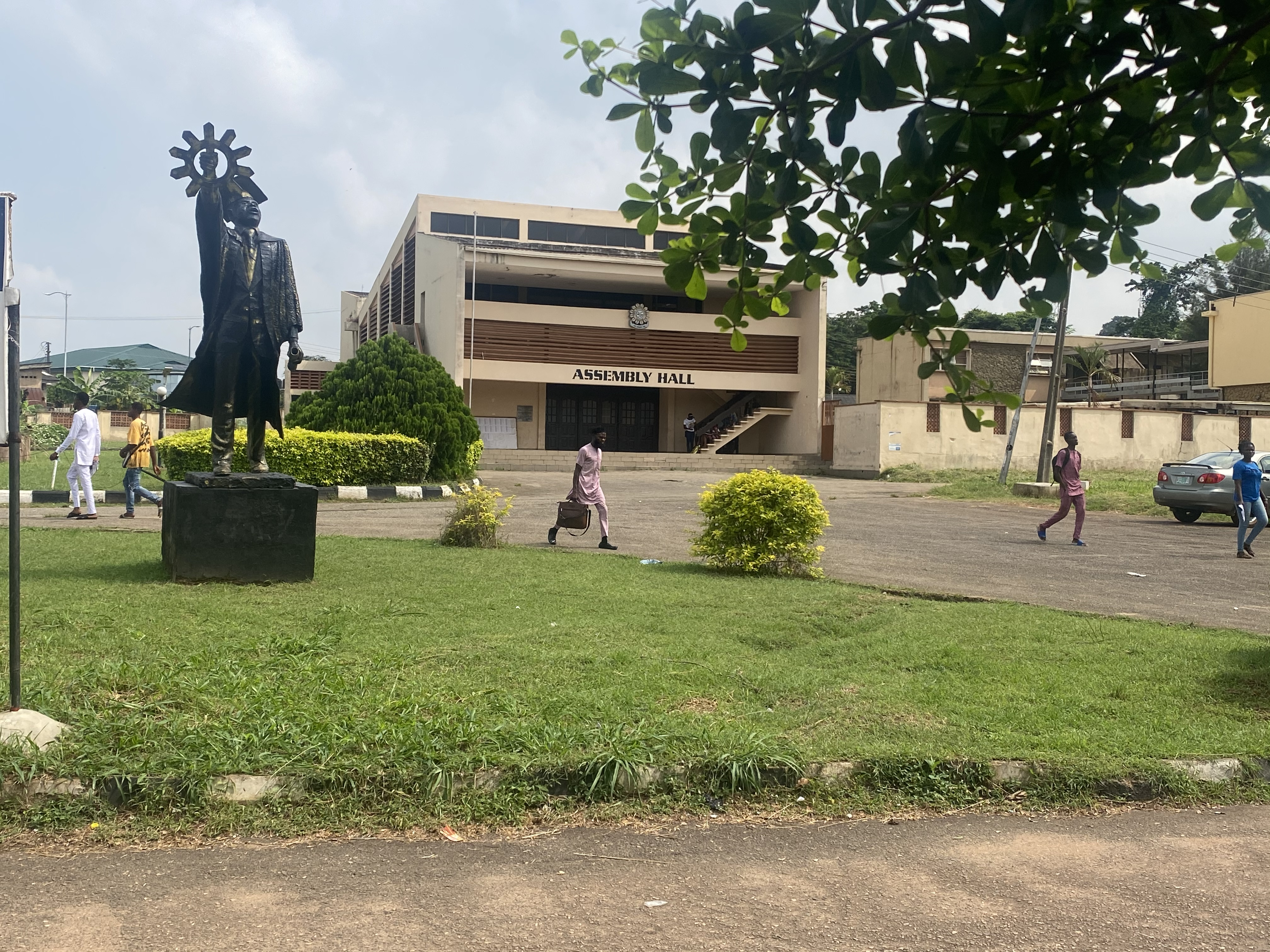
The Assembly Hall

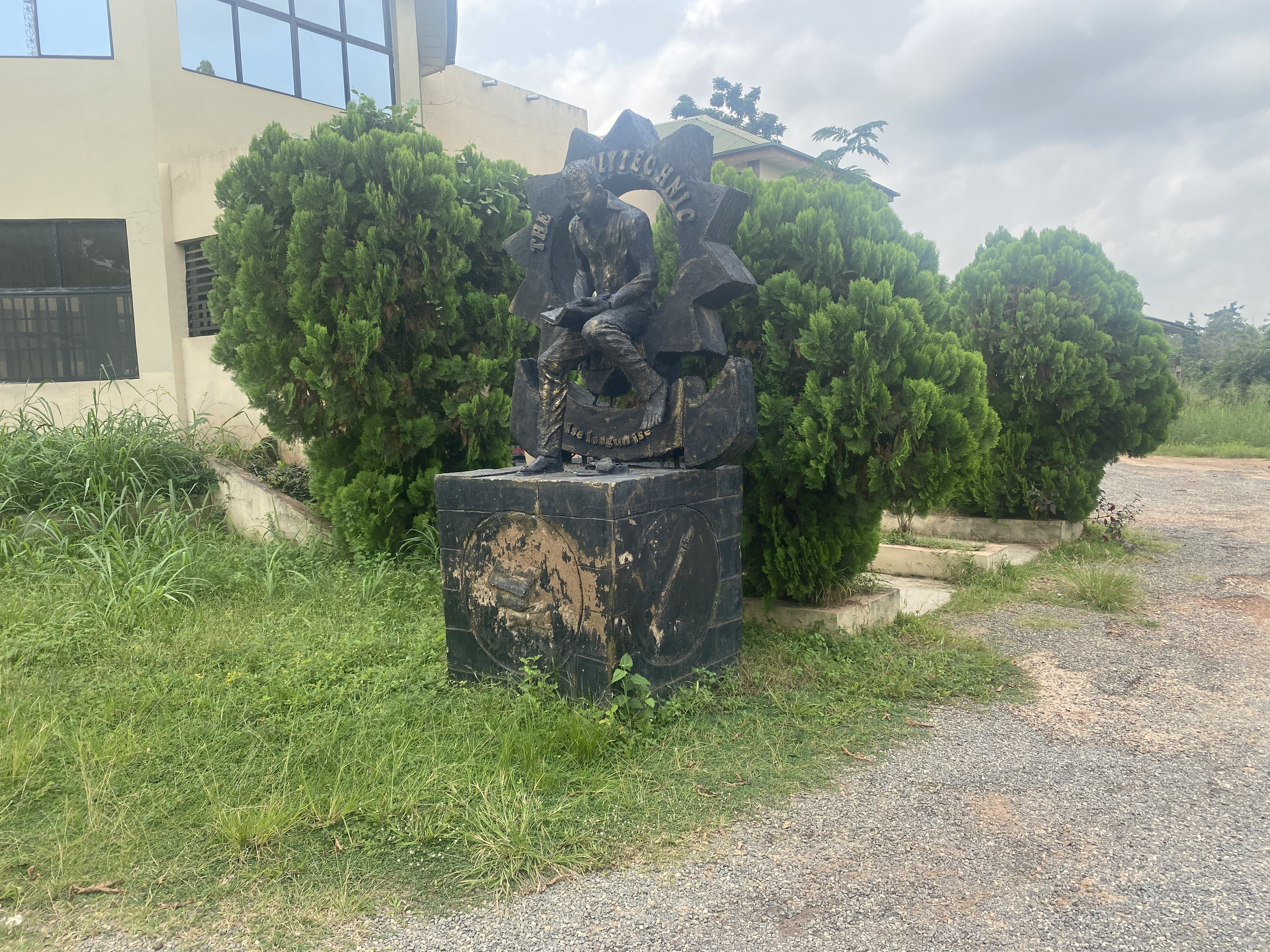
Central Library Statue
