= Michael and Cecilia Ibru University =

Nigerian private university

- Type: Private
- Established: 2015
- Chancellor: Cecilia Ibru
- Vice-Chancellor: Professor Ibiyinka A. Fuwape
- Location: Agbara-Otor, Delta State, Nigeria
- Website: mciu.edu.ng

Michael and Cecilia Ibru University is a private university located in Agbara-Otor in Delta State. The university was founded in 2015 by industrialist Michael Ibru and his wife, Cecilia Ibru. It is one of the Institutions supporting the AltSchool Africa programme to develop software engineers across the continent.

== Academic division ==
Michael and Cecilia Ibru University has a number of faculties and courses available. The National Universities Commission (NUC) approved 13 additional courses in 2021 to the institution. Some of the courses approved include LL.B Law, Marketing, Mass Communication, Microbiology, Public Administration and others.

The faculties in the university are listed below:

- Faculty of Arts and Humanities
- Faculty of Computing
- Faculty of Law
- Faculty of Management and Social Science
- Faculty of Natural and Applied Science

== Vice Chancellor ==
The vice chancellor of Michael and Cecilia Ibru University is Professor Ibiyinka Fuwape. The professor of Physics is the second substantive Vice-Chancellor of the Michael and Cecilia Ibru University. Before her appointment as the Vice Chancellor of Michael and Cecilia Ibru University, she was a professor and Lecturer at Federal University of Technology, Akure.

== Pro-chancellor ==
Joop Berkhout was until February 10, 2025, the Pro-chancellor and Chairman of the governing body of the university.
