= Dorcas Oluwade =

Nigerian lecturer

- Title: Vice-Chancellor

Academic background
- Education: National Open University

Dorcas Omanyo Oluwade is the Vice Chancellor of Salem University, Lokoja. She retired on January 18, 2021, after the school 17th Governing Council Meeting. Alewo Johnson Akubo, a professor of Sociology took over as the new vc.

She holds a B.Ed. in Administration and Planning and M.Ed. in Administration and Planning. She also holds a Ph.D. in Educational Administration and Planning

.
