= Ibiyinka =

- Gender: Male
- Language: Yoruba

Origin
- Origin: Nigeria
- Region of origin: Southwestern Nigeria

pronunciation

Ibiyinka is a Nigerian unisex Yoruba given name, which means ( birth surrounded me)

== notable people bearing the name ==
- Ibiyinka Alao (born 1975), Nigerian American artist, architect, writer, film director and musical composer
- Ibiyinka A. Fuwape (born 1962), Nigerian academic, professor in physics
- Bode George (Olabode Ibiyinka George), Nigerian politician
