= Olaiya Abideen =

Nigerian politician

- Constituency: Oyo state

Personal details
- Born: 1967 (age 58–59)
- Education: Federal University of Technology
- Occupation: Politician

Olaiya Abideen is a Nigerian politician and professor. He served as a Member of the House of Representatives in 1998, representing Ibadan South East and North East under the platform of GDM.

== Early life and education ==
Olaiya Abideen was born in 1967 in Oke Oluokun, Ibadan, Oyo State, Nigeria. He attended Ibadan Municipal Government Primary School III, Eleta, Ibadan, from 1975 to 1981. From 1981 to 1986, he attended Olubi Memorial Grammar School, Molete, Ibadan. He continued his studies at the Polytechnic Ibadan. Between 1987 and 1992, he earned his degree from the Federal University of Technology, Akure. He completed his master's degree at the University of Ibadan, from 1993 to 1995, and later pursued his Ph.D. at the same institution.

== Career ==
Abideen served as a member of the House of Representatives in 1998, representing Ibadan South East and North East under the platform of GDM. He contested the Oyo State governorship election in 2019, but was defeated by Oluwaseyi Abiodun Makinde, who ran under the People's Democratic Party (PDP). Abideen made unsuccessful bids for the party's chairmanship and the Federal Representative seat in 1999 and 2003, respectively. In 2003, he aligned with Chief Ladoja's team, and in 2007, he contested the Oluyole Federal seat under Ladoja's Labour Party, but was denied victory by Adedibu's influential cabal, which tampered with the election. He later ran for the same Oluyole Federal seat in the 2015 election with the Accord Party, only to be let down at the last minute.
