= Taibat Lawanson =

Nigerian academic (born 1976)

- Born: Taibat Olaitan Danmole; 21 August 1976 (age 50); Lagos, Nigeria
- Citizenship: Nigeria
- Occupations: Academic; urban planner
- Spouse: Ladi Lawanson
- Children: 2

Academic background
- Education: Federal University of Technology Akure (B.Tech, PhD); University of Lagos (M.Sc, PGD)
- Thesis: Assessment of Home Based Enterprises in Residential Areas of the Lagos Metropolis (2010)

Academic work
- Discipline: Urban Planning
- Sub-discipline: Urban Management and Governance
- Institutions: University of Lagos; University of Liverpool

Taibat Olaitan Lawanson (born 21 August 1976) is a Nigerian academic who is a Leverhulme Professor of Planning and Heritage at University of Liverpool and professor of urban management and governance at the University of Lagos, Nigeria, where she led the Pro-Poor Development Research Cluster. She was co-director at the University of Lagos Centre for Housing and Sustainable Development. Her research focuses on the interface of social complexities, urban poverty and the quest for spatial justice in urban planning in Africa. At the University of Liverpool, her work focuses on establishing the Global Urbanism and Heritage lab at the Architecture Heritage and Urbanism of West Africa Research Centre

== Career ==
Lawanson holds a PhD in Urban and Regional Planning from the Federal University of Technology, Akure, Nigeria. She was head of Department of Urban and Regional Planning at the University of Lagos between 2013 and 2015, She was a 2017 DAAD visiting professor to the Habitat Unit, Technische Universität Berlin.

Lawanson has published on issues relating to urban informality, environmental justice and pro-poor development in peer-reviewed academic journals and publications including Urban Studies, Area Development and Policy, International Journal of Environmental Research and Public Health, Cities & Health, among others.

Lawanson was a member of the board of directors of the Lagos Studies Association and is a member of the International Advisory committee of the UN-HABITAT flagship World Cities Report. She is a pioneer World Social Science Fellow of the International Social Science Council, a Fellow of the Nigerian Institute of Town Planners, Global Research Fellow of the Peace Research Institute and an alumna of the Rockefeller Foundation Bellagio Centre.
