= Evans Brothers (Nigeria Publishers) Limited =

Nigerian educational publishers

Evans Building, Ibadan

Evans Brothers (Nigeria Publishers) Limited is a Nigerian educational publisher that publishes textbook titles for all levels of education.

== History ==
In 1945 the British publishing firm Evans Brothers Limited "hired a consultant to come out to Nigeria and research the book needs of the then British colony of Nigeria". That consultant was Dr. L. C. Larcombe and following his trip, he wrote Larcombe’s Progressive Arithmetic (Lower, Middle and Upper Standard), a textbook series that came to dominate the primary arithmetic market in Nigeria in the 1950s, 1960s and 1970s.

With the success of this series and other publications such as Civics for Self Government by J. R. Bunting, Evans Brothers decided to send resident representatives to Nigeria to promote the interests of the company. The first of these was Ove Stentort who set up base in the university town of Ibadan.

In the 1960s with education growing in importance in Nigeria, Evans Brothers decided to set up a more targeted form of publishing in the country with better marketing and distribution. Then in December 1966 they set up a full-fledged Nigerian firm which was incorporated under the name of Evans Brothers (Nigeria Publishers) Limited, with Joop Berkhout as its pioneer managing director.

A major restructuring of the new company took place following the promulgation of the Nigerian Enterprises Promotion Decree of 1972 (also known as the indigenization decree) under which it "became mandatory for a minimum of 40% of the equity of companies to be owned by Nigerians".

Susanah O. Tomomowo-ayodele has described Evans Brothers (Nigeria Publishers) Limited as "Nigeria's leading educational publisher". It publishes a range of educational textbooks and learning materials (nursery, primary and secondary levels) along with some fiction and general publications. Textbooks from the firm occupy a commanding position in fields such as basic technology.
