= Ibiyinka A. Fuwape =

Nigerian physicist

Ibiyinka Agboola Fuwape
- Born: December 18, 1962 (age 63); Lagos State, Nigeria
- Education: Queens College, Lagos. University of Ibadan,(B.Sc.) University of Ibadan, (M.Sc.) University of Ibadan. (Ph.D.)
- Occupation: Nigerian Academic
- Spouse: Joseph Fuwape

Ibiyinka A. Fuwape (born 18 December 1962) is a Nigerian academic, professor in physics and the 2nd substantive Vice-Chancellor of the Michael and Cecilia Ibru University, a private university in Nigeria.

== Early life ==
Ibiyinka Fuwape was born in Lagos State on December 8, 1962 to the family of David Ademokun. She started her education at Reagan Memorial Baptist Girls Primary School, Yaba, Lagos. She proceeded to Methodist Girls' High School, where she earned her Ordinary level certificate, later earning her Higher School Certificate from 1979 to 1981 at Queen's College Yaba. She graduated from the University of Ibadan with a Bachelor of Science (B.Sc.) first class honors degree in Physics. She earned her Master of Science (M.Sc.) in 1986, and Doctor of Philosophy (PhD) degree in theoretical physics.

== Career ==
Ibiyinka started as an assistant lecturer in 1989 at the Federal University of Technology, Akure, and was promoted to Professor in October 2003. She served as Acting Head of Department and Head of the Physics Department for nine years. She also served as Dean, School of Sciences from 2011 to 2015. She was a member of the University Senate from 2003 to 2017, and acted as Chairman of the Senate during the 2014/2015 academic session. She won the award of Dean of the Year in 2012.

Ibiyinka Fuwape was a visiting scholar at Ohio University Athens, Ohio, United States of America (USA) from 2007-2009. She has published several papers in reputable journals both locally and internationally.

She was an Associate Member of the Abdus Salam Center for Theoretical Physics in Trieste, Italy, from 1996 to 2002. Her research at the Center focused on non-linear systems. She became a Team Leader for the International Union of Pure and Applied Physics working group for women in physics in 2002 and is still actively involved in the activities of this group. In 2006 she became a Schlumberger Fellow, in a program established by the Schlumberger Foundation to support science and technology education.

Her current research is about chaotic dynamics of the lower atmosphere.

== Honours and awards ==
In 2018, Fuwape was the recipient of the American Physical Society's Marshak Lectureship. Her address at the meeting of the Society was on the topic 'Women in Physics in Nigeria and Other sub-Saharan African Countries: Progress and Challenges'. She was the African Union Kwame Nkrumah Award for Scientific Excellence (Regional), 2020 edition.

She was named a Fellow of the American Physical Society in 2022 "for decades of leadership in the advancement of women in physics in Nigeria and Africa, along with major research contributions solving problems in climate change, agriculture, and finance at the interface of physics and society, thereby benefiting economic development in Africa".

== Personal life ==
She is married to Joseph Fuwape, former vice Chancellor of federal University of technology Akure.
