= Albert Ilemobade =

Nigerian academic and parasitologist (1936–2015)

2nd Vice Chancellor of the Federal University of Technology Akure
- In office 1987–1995
- Preceded by: Theodore Idibiye Francis
- Succeeded by: Lawrence Babatope Kolawole

Personal details
- Born: Albert Adeoye Ilemobade; 12 April 1936 Ondo State, Nigeria
- Died: 21 June 2015 (aged 79) Akure, Ondo State, Nigeria
- Citizenship: Nigerian
- Occupation: Academic leader; Veterinarian; Consultant

Albert Adeoye Ilemobade (12 April 1936 – 21 June 2015) was one of Nigeria’s leading veterinary parasitologist who had a distinguished career in Nigeria and internationally. He served as vice chancellor of the Federal University of Technology, Akure from 1987 to 1995 before he retired from the civil service in 1995.

He was born in Ondo State in 1936 and was educated at University of Ibadan, Oklahoma State University, Ahmadu Bello University, Zaria and University of Minnesota, St Paul He served as consultant to the World Health Organization on Tse-tse fly and Trypanosomiasis as well as consultant to Food and Agriculture Organization of the United Nations.

== Abduction and death ==
Ilemobade was kidnapped on 22 June 2015 by two of his domestic workers, Daniel Ita, his security guard and Yemi Bamitale, his driver who had been sacked few months before the incident. The plot to murder him was hatched on 21 June, by these housekeepers following a failed attempt by Ita, his driver to sell his Toyota SUV car. On 29 June 2015, his decomposed body was found in his residence at Ijapo estate in Akure, following a reminiscent of the smell of his body decomposition.

In an interview with Thisday, Bamitale claimed that Ilemobade was lured out of his house by Daniel, his gate-keeper under the pretense of electric spark within the house and the University Don was strangled to death in front of the gate where he lost the battle to the culprits. Bamitale further stressed that they went back into the house to loot the Professor's mobile phones, iPad, laptop, N7,000 and his Toyota SUV car. The culprits, Bamitale and Ita left for Ogun State that night but was arrested by officers of the Federal Road Safety Corps for driving with invalid vehicle documents but were later released after they paid for the release of the vehicle. They were apprehended in Ogun State in an attempt to sell the vehicle by officers of the Ogun State Police Command who were invited by the buyer of the car on the basis of the fact that the price placed on the car by the culprit was suspicious and ridiculous.

== Family ==
Professor Ilemobade was married to Christiana Olakitan (nee Akinrodoye).
