= FUTA Radio =

- Akure; Nigeria
- Frequency: 93.1 MHz

Programming
- Languages: English, Yoruba

Ownership
- Owner: Federal University of Technology Akure

History
- First air date: 2010

Links
- Website: radio.futa.edu.ng

FUTA Radio (93.1 MHz FM) is the radio station of the Federal University of Technology Akure in Akure, Ondo State, Nigeria. It commenced operation on 19 November 2010.

In 2015, the station facility was destroyed by fire caused by a power surge; students studying late at night helped prevent the blaze from spreading beyond the station and the university registrar's office.
