= Adenike Akinsemolu =

Nigerian academic and social entrepreneur

- Born: Adenike Adebukola Akinsemolu; Ondo State
- Education: Babcock University; Obafemi Awolowo University; Federal University of Technology Akure
- Occupations: Lecturer, Environmental Microbiologist, Author.
- Organization: Green Campus Initiative
- Known for: Green Institute, The Green Campus Initiative
- Notable work: She founded the Girl Prize which provides financial and mentorship support for young Nigerian secondary school girls
- Awards: Nigeria Energy Awards for Energy Efficiency and Advocacy and Robert Bosch Stiftung Young Researcher Award
- Website: https://greeninstitute.ng

Adenike Adebukola Akinsemolu is a Nigerian sustainability advocate, educator, author, and a social entrepreneur. She is a lecturer at Obafemi Awolowo University (Adeyemi College Campus). She is known as one of the country's leading experts on environmental sustainability.

Akinsemolu founded the Green Campus Initiative, which became the Green Institute. She founded the Girl Prize which provides financial and mentorship support for young Nigerian secondary school girls.

Akinsemolu has received the Robert Bosch Stiftung Award and the Nigeria Energy Award.

She is an author of papers published in academic journals, including on the role of microorganisms in achieving sustainable development goals.

== Career ==
Adenike Akinsemolu was born in Ondo State, Nigeria. She holds Master's and Ph.D degrees in Environmental Microbiology from Babcock University and Federal University of Technology, and a postgraduate diploma in Education from Obafemi Awolowo University. She worked with the Clinton Foundation in New York and later established the Green Campus Initiative.

Akinsemolu is an Associate Fellow of the Royal Commonwealth Society, and a member of the National Steering Committee of the Sustainable Energy Practitioners Association of Nigeria (SEPAN) under the Ministry of Power. She is a Robert Bosch Stiftung Young Researcher Awardee. In October 2015, she won Nigeria Energy Awards for Energy Efficiency and Advocacy.

She advocated for the inclusion of green education and sustainability in the Nigerian academic curriculum. In 2015, Sahara Reporters did a documentary on her Green Journey.

Akinsemolu serves as an Academic Associate with the United Nations Sustainable Development Solutions Network and a Scientific Committee Member of the 6th Annual International Conference on Sustainable Development (ICSD), at The Earth Institute, Columbia University. In 2020, Akinsemolu published the book: "The Principles of Green and Sustainability Science," that examines sustainability issues in Africa.

In March 2021, Akinsemolu was recognized as one of the top youth leaders in conservation on the continent, becoming one of the Nigerian winners of the Africa's Top 100 Young Conservation Leaders award by the Africa Alliance of the YMCA, the World Organization of the Scout Movement, the African Wildlife Foundation and World Wildlife Fund.

== Green Institute ==
In 2015, Akinsemolu founded Green Campus Initiative (GCI), the first campus-based environmental advocacy organization in Nigeria. Its organizational model was recognized at the Fourth Annual Green Campuses Conference, 2015, at the University of the Western Cape in South Africa, with awards for green campus activities. GCI is a member of the UN Sustainable Development Solutions Network. In 2016, the Green Campus Initiative developed into the Green Institute, the sustainability research and training institution, and a social enterprise. Professor Damilola S. Olawuyi became the first president of the institute. The institute provides academic programs on Sustainability and activities on building social entrepreneurship, in line with meeting the United Nations Sustainable Development Goals. The organization is the first academic institution in Nigeria to finance college tuition through a waste management program named "Trash for education", which provides students with credits in return for collected waste, which is later purchased by the state government and private enterprises.

In June 2020, The Green Institute organized a global sustainability summit on World Environment Day (5 June), gathering over twenty five sustainability leaders from various countries, including the renowned economic environmentalist, Jeffrey Sachs.

== Social issues and advocacy ==
Akinsemolu has promoted the girl child education cause and founded the "Girl Prize," a scholarship and mentorship program. She participated in the Clinton Foundation relief mission, following the 2004 Indian Ocean earthquake and Hurricane Katrina in New Orleans.

== Awards and recognition ==
- Robert Bosch Stiftung Young Researcher Award.
- Nigeria Energy Awards for Energy Efficiency and Advocacy, 2015.
- Member of the National Steering Committee of the Sustainable Energy Practitioners Association of Nigeria (SEPAN)
- Academic Associate with the United Nations Sustainable Development Solutions Network.
- Scientific Committee Member of the 6th Annual International Conference on Sustainable Development (ICSD)

== Publications ==
=== Academic papers ===
- Akinsemolu, Adenike A. (2018-05-01). "The role of microorganisms in achieving the sustainable development goals". Journal of Cleaner Production. 182: 139–155. doi:10.1016/j.jclepro.2018.02.081. ISSN 0959-6526.
- Akinsemolu, Adenike A.; Olukoya, Obafemi A. P. (2020-02-10). "The vulnerability of women to climate change in coastal regions of Nigeria: A case of the Ilaje community in Ondo State". Journal of Cleaner Production. 246 119015. doi:10.1016/j.jclepro.2019.119015. ISSN 0959-6526. S2CID 211383385.

=== Book ===
- Akinsemolu, Adenike (2020). The Principles of Green and Sustainability Science. Springer Singapore. ISBN 978-981-15-2492-9.
