= Joop Berkhout =

Dutch-Nigerian book publisher (1930–2025)

- Born: 31 March 1930; Amsterdam, Netherlands
- Died: 11 February 2025 (aged 94); Ibadan, Oyo State, Nigeria
- Occupation: Publisher
- Children: 4
- Writing career
- Notable awards: OON

Joop Jozef Berkhout (31 March 1930 – 11 February 2025) was a Dutch–Nigerian book publisher who was the Okun-Borode of Ile-Ife and was also the founding managing director of Evans Brothers Limited in Nigeria, and founding executive chairman of Spectrum Books (until 2008), and Safari Books Limited, Ibadan, Nigeria.

== Early life and education ==
Berkhout was born on 31 March 1930, in Amsterdam, in the Netherlands. He was his parents' last child from a Catholic background. The Great Depression (1929–1939) caused his family to move from Amsterdam to IJmuiden when he was four. During that period, his father's hotel business suffered great challenges in Amsterdam.

Between 1937 and 1943, Berkhout attended St. Lucia Primary School, Haarlem, and then from 1943 to 1948, St. Jeroen Secondary School. According to his interview with Punch Nigeria, even though the World War II did not come close to his family's dwelling place in Holland, till he turned 10, his family was affected by it. He recounted how the war brought in hunger and hardship to his family and others. He said he could not obtain tertiary education, but like many other younger people, he left the Netherlands and began to work, instead.

== Career ==
As Berkhout recounted, some of his family members lived in Australia, Zimbabwe, and South Africa following the World War II. He decided to go to Africa. His journey in Africa began in Tanzania where he got trained at the Oxford University Press (OUP) and began selling books for a bookshop. He subsequently moved to work in Kenya, Zambia, Malawi, then finally to Nigeria.

His achievements in Tanzania got the OUP interested in him, and he served as the OUP Manager in Lusaka, Zambia, from 1964 to 1966. His transfer to Nigeria by the OUP came on the same day he got a letter of contract job offer from Evans Brothers Ltd with headquarters in the United Kingdom to become its pioneering General Manager in Nigeria, with better offers. After deciding on which company to accept its offer with his wife, they opted for Evans. They moved to Nigeria in 1966. Initially, his work with Evans was to last for two years. A year later, however, the infamous Nigerian Civil War began.

10 years later, he got promoted as Marketing Director of Evans Publishers in the UK. He relocated with his family to the UK, but soon resigned to return to Nigeria because he never liked the working environment in the UK. In 1978, Berkhout co-founded Spectrum Books Limited.

In August 1991, he registered Safari Books Limited. In September 2008, he retired and sold Spectrum Books Limited alongside Soladayo Ogunniyi, stepping down as its executive chairman. Two weeks later, he was agitated and decided to resume publishing with Safari Books Limited. His favourite publications were biographies and autobiographies.

Until his death, Berkhout was the Pro-Chancellor and Chairman of the Governing Council of Michael and Cecilia Ibru University, Agbarha, Delta State, Nigeria. Business Day said that Berkhout lived about 60 years in Nigeria until his death.

== Personal life ==
Berkhout married his wife in the Netherlands and they had their first three children in Tanzania. One was born in Nigeria. The first was born in 1961, the second in 1963, the third in 1965, and the fourth in [?1967].

In Nigeria, his wife looked after the children to inculcate family values in them. As of 2020, his eldest son worked as a professor in King's College London, the next two lived in the UK, and the last one an architect in Lagos. His wife died of cancer earlier on.

About religious views, he described himself as an unbeliever in 2020. Although in his small autobiography, as stated by a Punch Nigeria interviewer, he wanted to be a pope as a child. He said he abandoned the idea when he learned of a 13th century Dutch pope who got assassinated three months after being made pope. His thoughts were that he would also be targeted for being Dutch.

=== Death ===
Berkhout died in Ibadan on 11 February 2025, at the age of 94. His death was mourned by the Nigerian President.

== Awards and honours ==
Berkhout got an Officer of the Order of the Niger (OON) award from the Nigerian government. He also got the chieftaincy title of "Okunborode of Ife" in 1992 by the Ooni of Ife, Oba Okunade Sijuade.
