= Adebiyi Daramola =

Nigerian academic (1958–2022)

Prof. Adebiyi Daramola

6th Vice-Chancellor of the Federal University of Technology Akure
- In office 22 May 2012 – 23 May 2017
- Preceded by: Emmanuel Adebayo Fashakin (acting)
- Succeeded by: Joseph Fuwape

Personal details
- Born: Adebiyi Gregory Daramola; 2 March 1958 Okemesi, Western Region, British Nigeria (now in Ekiti State, Nigeria)
- Died: 25 March 2022 (aged 64)
- Education: The Polytechnic, Ibadan; Obafemi Awolowo University; University of Ibadan
- Profession: Academic

Adebiyi Gregory Daramola (2 March 1958 – 25 March 2022) was a Nigerian academic and professor of agricultural economics, who served as the Vice-chancellor of the Federal University of Technology, Akure from May 2012 to May 2017.

== Early life and education ==
Daramola was born on 2 March 1958 in Okemesi, then Western Region to Elizabeth Eniola and Michael Adebayo Daramola. He attended Anglican Grammar School, Ile-Ife between January 1969 and December 1971 and St. Charles College, Osogbo from January 1972 to June 1974 for his secondary education. He attended The Polytechnic, Ibadan from 1975 to June 1976 and proceeded to the University of Ife (now Obafemi Awolowo University), Ile-Ife in October 1976 and obtained his first degree in June 1980. He thereafter proceeded to the University of Ibadan where he obtained the MSc and PhD degrees in Agricultural Economics in 1982 and 1987 respectively.

== Career ==
Daramola started his lectureship career at the University of Ibadan as a Teaching/Tutorial Assistant in the Department of Agricultural Economics in 1982. He later joined the services of the Federal University of Technology, Akure as an Assistant Lecturer in the Department of Agricultural Economics and Extension on 1 September 1986. He rose to the grade of professor on 1 October 1999. Between 1990 and 1991, he was a Postdoctoral fellow at the Center for Advanced Training in Agricultural Economics, Department of Agricultural Economics and Business Management, University of New England, Armidale, New South Wales, Australia. Before becoming vice chancellor on 22 May 2012, he had held many strategic positions in FUTA. He was at various times, Examinations Officer in the Department of Agricultural Economics (September 1987 – August 1990), Coordinator of Students’ Industrial Works Experience Scheme (SIWES) in the Department of Agricultural Economics (September 1992 – August 1995), Acting Head, Department of Agricultural Economics and Extension (1 August – 31 July 2005), Head of the Department of Agricultural Economics (1 August – 31 July 2005) and chairman, University Ceremonials Committee, 2004 to 2011.

He undertook many diverse engagements for many national and international organizations. and also served as chairman, Committee of Vice Chancellors (CVC) and Association of Vice Chancellor of Nigerian Universities (AVCNU), two positions he held concurrently between 2015 and 2017.

== Awards and recognition ==
Daramola won many scholarships and awards, among which were the Federal Government of Nigeria Postgraduate Scholarship Award (1982); University of Ibadan Scholarship for Postgraduate Study (1982); and Postdoctoral Fellowship, University of New England, Armidale, New South Wales, Australia (1990). He was a fellow of the Nigerian Association of Agricultural Economists (NAAE) and a member of several professional bodies. Some of these are the American Association of Agricultural Economists (AAAE); International Association of Agricultural Economists (IAAE); and African Association of Agricultural Economists (AAAE), where he was an Executive Committee member. Professor Daramola served as the Chief Editor and chairman of the editorial board of African Journal of Agricultural and Resource Economics (AfJARE), Pretoria, South Africa (1 January 2010 to 2013). He was also a consultant to several national and international organisations, such as the World Bank, Ford Foundation, USAID, DfID, African Development Bank (AfDB), Cocoa Research Institute of Nigeria (CRIN) and Community Development Foundation, Lagos, Nigeria, among others. He published several papers in both local and international journals and conference proceedings.

== Vice chancellor ==
He became FUTA's sixth substantive vice chancellor in May 2012, with the avowed purpose of "taking FUTA to the market place" and making it a key player in the global academic arena. He wanted students to become ICT whiz kids and innovators, a new generation that would champion the country's development in technology. He also provided support for technology-enhanced student-centred teaching and learning. Not surprisingly, students won prizes at several national and international competitions in the areas of ICT, Mathematics, Business, Building, Quantity Surveying and Transport Management. They designed apps, won national and Africa regional essay competitions, got international internship opportunities, won seed money for their start-ups. He loved students’ intellectual debate programmes and supported students to attend competitions all over Nigeria.

Under his watch, FUTA became an international university. It was he who initiated the collaboration with the Florida Agricultural and Mechanical University (FAMU), Tallahassee, Florida, USA, in which qualified penultimate year students completed the final year of their first degree at FAMU to earn a FUTA Bachelor's degree and earn a FAMU Master's in their second year. The internationalization drive of Professor Daramola also birthed collaborations with the London South Bank University, United Kingdom and other major Universities around the globe culminating in staff and student exchanges. One of the main gains of the internationalization drive was the joint conference organised by FUTA, London South Bank University and the DeMontfort University, Leicester, England in 2016 in FUTA. The United Nations World Habitat Programme also collaborated with FUTA in 2016 to launch its Programme in Akure.

Some of his notable achievements included the establishment of the Centre for Entrepreneurship (CET) (2013) and Centre for Renewable Energy Technology (CRET) (2014). He repositioned the university's Centre for Space Research and Applications (CESRA) for global recognition. Through CESRA, FUTA became the second African institutional member of the prestigious International Astronautical Federation, a federation that has notable space agencies like NASA, ESA, ISRO, CSA, and Roscosmos as institutional members. FUTA also became the first Nigerian and second African university to launch a cube satellite into outer space, thus putting FUTA's footprint in space, a notable achievement by all standards. This was in collaboration with Kyushu Institute of Technology, Kyushu, Japan and the National Space Research and Development Agency.

The Daramola tenure also witnessed improvement in infrastructural provision in the university. The 2500-capacity Auditorium, now renamed Obafemi Awolowo Auditorium and the New Senate Building initiated by his predecessors in office were completed. He also embarked on new projects: student hostels, an International Scholars’ Lodge, lecture theatres, and a university bookshop. The university's road networks were renovated, upgraded and rehabilitated. An extension was added to the University Library and full digitalization commenced. The goodwill created through the university's engagement with public and private sector players led to the donation of two tractors, a 1000-capacity lecture theatre, 118 solar-powered street lights, the students’ recreation centre, and 110 laptop computers to the university, a fire station, and the University Advancement Centre. FUTA's local and national impact became more noticeable: the university's Centre for Entrepreneurship was engaged by the Ondo State Government to provide training for cocoa farmers and by the Niger Delta Development Commission to provide vocational and entrepreneurial training to ex-militants. Similarly, the university worked with engineers from the Nigerian Air Force to overcome some challenges with some of its aircraft.

He finished his term in May 2017. When asked about his future plans, he had this to say: “My future plans are in God’s hands. All I know is that I am proceeding on my sabbatical leave and my accumulated leave. Whatever happens thereafter is in God’s hands. He orders my steps. God orders my steps” (Landmarks of a Transformational Era, p. 112). He was succeeded as vice chancellor by Professor Joseph Adeola Fuwape.

== Personal life and death ==
He travelled to 22 countries on five continents of Africa, Asia, Europe, North America and Oceania.

He was married to Funmilayo for 36 years, with whom he had a daughter, Tolu, and 2 sons, Tayo and Tope. He was catholic

He died on Friday, 25 March 2022, at the age of 64.
