= Gideon Guitar =

Nigerian-born guitarist (born 1991)

- Born: Gideon Tobi Olajide; 16 September 1991 (age 34); Osogbo,Osun State, Nigeria
- Genres: jazz, afrobeat, worship
- Occupations: guitarist; composer
- Instrument: Guitar
- Years active: 2013-till date

Gideon Tobi Olajide (born September 16, 1991), professionally known as Gideon Guitar, is a Nigerian-born guitarist and composer. He is widely known among African music communities in Nigeria and the United Kingdom for his live performances, which is often rooted in African Highlife and Afrobeat guitar traditions. He has collaborated with Odunayo Aboderin, Adedoyin Oseni and Theophilus Ogaga.

== Background and education ==
Gideon was born in Osogbo, Osun State, but is originally from Ilesa. He obtained a bachelor's degree in Agricultural Economics and Extension from the Federal University of Technology, Akure in 2015 and a master's degree in Logistics and Supply Chain Management from the Sheffield Hallam University in United Kingdom in 2024.

== Career ==
Gideon Guitar began his musical journey in 2013 as a pianist, performing at church programmes and community events across Osun State. Immersed in Highlife and Tungba-influenced performances, he built a strong and harmonic foundation before encountering the instrument that would later define his artistic identity.

His transition to the electric guitar happened organically during a rehearsal session, where an introduction to the instrument immediately captured his interest. From that moment, Gideon Guitar committed himself to mastering the guitar, drawing inspiration from renowned guitarists George Benson, Earl Klugh, Agboola Shadare, and Sammy Guitar. He developed his own style. Over time, he evolved into a multi-genre guitarist, influenced by jazz, gospel, and contemporary African music, while maintaining a clear professional focus on African Highlife and Afrobeat guitar traditions.

Professionally, Gideon Guitar's career spans both Nigeria and the United Kingdom. In Nigeria, he performed at concerts and curated music programmes, collaborating with artists including Bisi Alawiye Aluko, Elijah Daniel, Kayefi, and Adedoyin Oseni. Since relocating to the UK, he has continued to perform across cultural and public platforms, including Migration Matters Festival, Culture Club Sheffield, Gratitude concert and Tales & Tunes with Kayefi. He presently serves as the lead guitarist at RCCG Freedom Centre in the United Kingdom.

Beyond performance, Gideon Guitar is recognized for his leadership within organized music programmes. He serves as a lead guitarist and contributes to rehearsal coordination, collaborative arrangement work, and the mentorship of emerging guitarists.

Renowned music critic Emmanuel Daraloye described his performance at the Gratitude concert in Sheffield 2025 as "A Blessed Touch"

In January 2026, Gideon hosted an intimate listening session for his latest extended guitar work, Hymnal Reflections in Rotherham, UK.
