= Adebisi Balogun =

Nigerian academic (born 1952)

5th Vice-Chancellor of the Federal University of Technology Akure
- In office January 2007 – January 2012
- Preceded by: Peter Adeniyi
- Succeeded by: Emmanuel Adebayo Fashakin (acting)

Personal details
- Born: Adebisi Mojeed Balogun; 2 August 1952 (age 74) Ile-Ife, Southern Region, British Nigeria (now in Osun State, Nigeria)
- Spouses: Omotola Ibiteye Olaoye (m. 1981, divorced): Olusola Oluropo Falade
- Children: 3
- Parent: Adetunji Saka Balogun (father)
- Education: University of Ibadan
- Profession: Academic

Adebisi Mojeed Balogun (born 2 August 1952) is a Nigerian agricultural biochemist, educator, nutritionist, academic and professor of fish nutrition, who served as the vice-chancellor of the Federal University of Technology, Akure from January 2007 to January 2012.

== Early life and education ==
Adebisi Balogun was born on 2 August 1952 in Ile Ife, then Southern Region, British Nigeria, to Adetunji Saka and Modelola Balogun (née Afilaka). He attended University of Ibadan where he received bachelor of science in Agricultural biochemistry in 1976, master of science in 1978 and doctor of philosophy in 1982.

== Career ==
After receiving his doctorate degree in 1982, he became a research fellow, Nigerian Institute of Oceanography and Marine research, Lagos, Nigeria from 1982 to 1983, he was a lecturer at the University of Ibadan from 1983 to 1988, he moved to the Federal University of Technology Akure in 1988. He became a professor in 1994, he was Dean of the School of Agriculture and Agricultural Technology, FUTA from 1997 to 2001. He was a member of the Senate of FUTA from 1988 to 2012, member of the governing council from 1993, chairman Faculty Research Committee, School of Agriculture and Agricultural Technology, chairman Environmental Sanitation Committee, chairman Sports Council, chairman Ceremonials Committee and vice chancellor from 2007 to 2012.
