= Babajide Oluwase =

Nigerian Entrepreneur

- Born: 1 July 1991 (age 35); Lagos, Nigeria
- Education: Federal University of Technology Akure; Lagos Business School; University of Iowa
- Occupations: Business Executive, Entrepreneur
- Known for: Cleantech, urban management and sustainability
- Notable work: Author of The Young Climate Heroes
- Title: Founder and CEO at Ecotutu
- Website: jideoluwase.com

Babajide Oluwase (born 1 July 1991) is a Nigerian cleantech entrepreneur. He is the founder and CEO of Ecotutu, a cleantech enterprise in Nigeria that provides solar-powered cold storage and cooling solutions.

Since 2023, he has served as a trustee on the board of Youth Business International (YBI). From 2021 to 2024, he was an advisor to the Delegation of the European Union to Nigeria and ECOWAS, focusing on the Green and Digital Economy. In 2016, he authored Young Climate Heroes, a children's book aimed at introducing environmental sustainability and climate action to young readers.

== Early life and education ==
Babajide Oluwase was born on 1 July 1991 in Lagos, Nigeria. He completed his Bachelor of Technology (Hons) in Urban and Regional Planning at the Federal University of Technology Akure (FUTA). In 2016, he obtained a mini-MBA from Lagos Business School, followed by a Leadership in Business certificate at the University of Iowa as part of the Mandela Washington Fellowship. He later pursued a master's degree in urban management at the University of Lagos, as a DAAD Scholar.

== Career ==
After his studies, Oluwase got involved in projects supporting urban resilience, climate adaptation, and housing in Lagos. In 2016, he authored a fictional story book 'Young Climate Heroes', which has been used in schools to engage students on the basics of sustainability and climate change from an early age.

In 2016, Oluwase founded RenewDrive, a renewable energy start-up aimed at improving access to clean energy and sustainable cooling solutions. In 2020, the company was rebranded as Ecotutu, expanding its mission to provide multichannel solar-powered cold storage and mobile cooling solutions for businesses across Nigeria.

== Additional career ==
Until 2023, Oluwase was a Global Shaper of the World Economic Forum, he is winner of The Tony Elumelu Foundation Grant and a Mandela Washington Fellowship, a flagship program of the United States Department of State.

He is a trustee on the board of Youth Business International (YBI) since 2023. From 2021 to 2024, he served as an advisor to the Delegation of the European Union to Nigeria and ECOWAS on the Green and Digital Economy. Since 2023, he is also a member of the Youth Advisory Committee of the Netherlands Consulate in Lagos.

He is a contributor to global platforms, including the World Economic Forum Agenda, Business Day Nigeria, Deutsche Welle, and Youth Business International publications, where he writes on entrepreneurship, urban planning, and cleantech innovation.

== Awards and fellowship ==
- Fellow, Mandela Washington Fellowship (2022).
- The Tony Elumelu Foundation/GIZ Fellow (2018).
- Global Entrepreneurship Summit Covid Resilience award nominee (2022).
- Winner, Orange Corners Nigeria Innovation Fund (2021).
- Fellow, LEAP Africa Social Innovators Programme (2019/2020).
- Fellow, Sustainable Solutions Africa 30 under 30 (2019).
- Finalist, Youth Business International (YBI) (2022).
- Yunus and Youth Global Fellow (2020).
- NutriPitch Grand Prize Winner (2021).
- Africa Climate-KIC Innovator (2021).
- Zenith Bank Tech Fair 2.0 Winner.

== Social impact ==
Through Ecotutu, Oluwase has enabled farmers and health providers to preserve perishable goods and medicines while using dependable clean energy. His work has supported food security, public health, and economic resilience while reducing carbon emissions from traditional cold storage solutions.
