= Peter Adeniyi =

Nigerian academic and administrator (born 1944)

Professor Peter Adeniyi OON

4th Vice Chancellor of the Federal University of Technology Akure
- In office January 2002 – December 2006
- Preceded by: Robert Adebowale Ogunsusi (acting)
- Succeeded by: Adebisi Balogun

Personal details
- Born: Peter Olufemi Adeniyi; 4 April 1944 (age 82)
- Citizenship: Nigeria

Peter Olufemi Adeniyi, OON (born 4 April 1944) is a distinguished Nigerian academic and administrator. He served as vice chancellor of the Federal University of Technology Akure from 2002 to 2006. He was the winner of the John I. Davidson Award (Third Prize) donated by the International Geographic Information Foundation in 1984.

He received the Nigerian National Honour Officer of the Order of the Niger (OON) in 2005. He was Pro-Chancellor and Chairman of Council of the University of Ado Ekiti, now Ekiti State University, Ado Ekiti, Nigeria.

Adeniyi was the First President of the African Association of Remote Sensing of the Environment (AARSE). He is a member of the Global Ocean Observing Committee.

Adeniyi alongside Prof. Peter Okebukola, Prof. Oyewusi Ibidapo-Obe and Mrs Esther Bolu-Ashafa were described by the Governor of Ekiti State, Engr. Segun Oni as "exceptional talents" that could help sustain the legacy of University education in Ekiti State in order for the state to "achieve exceptional results".

== Accomplishments ==
Adeniyi was credited with rapid development and transformation of the Federal University of Technology Akure into NUC (Nigerian University Commission) ranked best university of Science and Technology in Nigeria. His five-year tenure witnessed a massive increase in the number of functional lecture theatres and research laboratories built and commissioned for the use of students in the university.

Adeniyi has also been credited with the rapid development of computing and the adoption of Information Communication Technology by FUTA. "FUTA's strong commitment to ICT has gained particular strength under the current leadership of Professor Peter O. Adeniyi, the Vice Chancellor who believes that, FUTA, being the foremost University of Technology in Nigeria, should be totally ICT driven – academically and administratively". As vice-chancellor, Prof. Peter Adeniyi set up 15 task forces on 20 February 2002 of which the Task Force on Communication was one.

Adeniyi was also a member of the Presidential Technical committee on Land Reform inaugurated on 2 April 2009 with a mandate to explore the feasibility of "the establishment of a National Depository for Land Title Holdings and Records in all states of the federation and the Federal Capital Territory".
