= Joseph Fuwape =

Nigerian academic (born 1957)

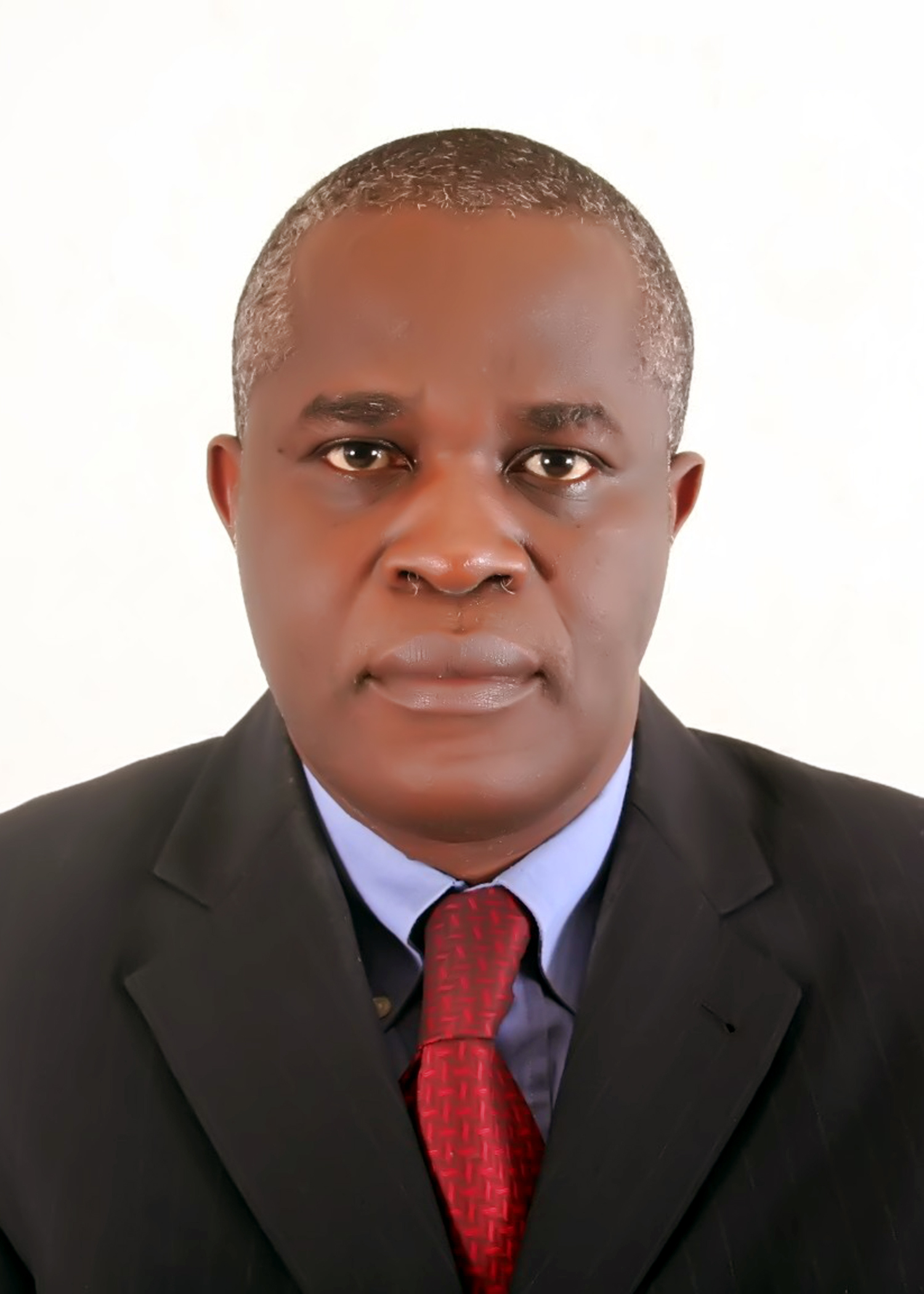

7th Vice Chancellor of the Federal University of Technology Akure
- In office 23 May 2017 – 23 May 2022
- Preceded by: Prof. Adebiyi Daramola
- Succeeded by: Prof. Adenike Oladiji

Personal details
- Born: Joseph Adeola Fuwape; 11 November 1957 (age 68) Ile-Ife, Western Region, British Nigeria (now in Osun State, Nigeria)
- Party: Non-Partisian

Joseph Adeola Fuwape (born 11 November 1957) is a Nigerian academic who served as the seventh substantive vice chancellor of the Federal University of Technology Akure (FUTA) from May 2017 to May 2022. His appointment was ratified by the governing council of the institution on 18 May 2017. He succeeded Prof. Adebiyi Daramola. Before then, he was the vice chancellor at Salem University.

Prior to succeeding Professor Paul Omojo Omaji as Vice Chancellor of Salem University, Fuwape was Head of Forestry and Wood Technology Department at Federal University of Technology Akure (FUTA) for seven years. He was Dean School of Agriculture and Agricultural Technology for four years at FUTA, and a member of the university's Governing Council there for eight years. He was the first Director of Quality Assurance Unit at FUTA from 2010 to 2012.

== Education ==
Prof. Fuwape obtained his first degree in forestry in 1979 from University of Ibadan (UI). He bagged his M.Sc. and Ph.D. degrees in Wood Products Engineering in 1982 and 1984 respectively from the same institution.

== Profile ==
Professor Adeola Fuwape served as the Vice-Chancellor Federal University of Technology, Akure from May 2017 to May 2022.
