= Adenike Oladiji =

Nigerian academic (born 1968)

Prof. Adenike Oladiji

8th Vice-Chancellor of the Federal University of Technology Akure
- Incumbent
- Assumed office 24 May 2022
- Preceded by: Joseph Fuwape

Personal details
- Born: 27 April 1968 (age 58) Kwara, Nigeria
- Education: University of Ilorin
- Occupation: Biochemist
- Profession: Academic

Adenike Temidayo Oladiji (born 27 April 1968) is a Nigerian academic and the first female vice-chancellor of the Federal University of Technology Akure. Her appointment was ratified by the governing council of the institution at its special meeting held on 13 May 2022. She succeeded Professor Joseph Fuwape, whose term ended on Monday 23 May 2022. Before her appointment, she held various positions and served on University Committees at the University of Ilorin as Chairman and Member.

She has also served in various capacities at the University of Ilorin including Head of Department, Sub Dean of Faculty, Deputy Director Center for International Education, Director of the Center for Research and Development and In-house Training, and Director of Central Research Laboratory. She has also served as Dean School of Basic Medical Sciences (Kwara State University), Dean School of Life Sciences, and Member of the Governing Council, Federal Polytechnic, Nasarawa, and Crown Hill University, Eiyenkorin, Ilorin.

== Education ==
Adenike Oladiji was born on 27 April 1968. She attended Christ Anglican School, Ijomu-Oro, and Iludun Oro Nursery and Primary School between 1972 and 1977. She had her secondary education at St. Claire’s Anglican Grammar School, Offa from 1977 to 1982, all in Kwara State. She holds a B.Sc Biochemistry, Second Class Upper Division Degree from the University of Ilorin, 1988, MSc. Biochemistry, University of Ilorin, 1991 and Doctor of Philosophy Degree in Biochemistry from the University of Ilorin, 1997.

== Profile ==
She joined the services of the University of Ilorin in July 1992 as Assistant Lecturer and was appointed a Professor in September 2011. She has over 29 years of continuous service in the university system. She has held various positions and served on almost all University Committees as Chairman and Member. She has also served in various capacities including Head of Department; Sub Dean of Faculty; Deputy Director of, the Center for International Education; Director, of the Center for Research and Development and In-House Training; Director, of Central Research Laboratory; Dean of, the School Of Basic Medical Sciences (Kwara State University); Dean, School of Life Sciences and Member, Governing Council, Federal Polytechnic, Nasarawa and Crown Hill University, Eiyenkorin, Ilorin.

A prolific researcher with over 100 publications, Professor Oladiji has won many distinctions and awards which include the University’s Merit Award, Certificate of Merit, and scholarships among others. She is a Fellow of the Nigerian Academy of Science and Fellow, of the Nigerian Society for Biochemistry and Molecular Biology. She has served as a Member of various Scientific Committees at the National Universities Commission, NUC, Tertiary Education Fund, and TetFund and has been an external examiner in over 20 Universities in Nigeria and outside the country. She is a Member of Professional Bodies such as the West Africa Research and Innovation Management (WARIMA), the American Society of Nutrition, the Organization for Women in Science for Developing World (OSWD), the Science Association of Nigeria, and the Nigerian Society for Experimental Biology. She is happily married and blessed with children.

Professor Oladiji succeeded Professor Joseph Fuwape, whose term ended on Monday 23 May 2022.
