= Green Campus Initiative (UCT) =

University of Cape Town student organisation

- Abbreviation: GCI
- Formation: 2007
- Type: Student Organisation
- Purpose: Environmental action and Education
- Headquarters: University of Cape Town
- Location: Cape Town, South Africa
- Volunteers: 800
- Website: blogs.uct.ac.za/UCTGCI/

Green Campus Initiative (GCI), is a student organisation within the University of Cape Town. It aims to make UCT a sustainable and environmentally friendly institution. It was started towards the end of 2007 by Susan Botha, who had been working for the Namaqualand Restoration Initiative (NRI) at UCT. The initiative has its origins in the Botany Department, where Susan's work was based, but the organisation quickly grew to a campus-wide initiative. Susan is responsible for the formalisation of the GCI, including the naming of the organisation, the formation of a group on Vula (UCT's internal online network), the articulation of a specific aim for the organisation (to work toward a carbon-neutral university campus), as well as the founding and co-execution of many of the first projects. These first projects included the implementation of campus-wide recycling; the organisation of UCT's first Green Week; the Building-to-Building Roadshow initiative and the promotion and implementation of carpooling. Each year a new GCI committee is elected, which includes portfolios that run the different projects. As of September 2010, the GCI has over 1500 members on Vula, of which approximately 100 are actively participating in projects.

== Vision ==
The vision of the GCI is to shift UCT towards a carbon neutral, environmentally conscious institution through the volunteer efforts of staff and students. It also aims to become a vehicle to create, support and implement green projects driven by the university community that will reduce UCT's carbon footprint and increase its use of sustainable practices.

== Portfolios and projects ==
GCI is involved in a large range of green projects and has established itself as the go-to group for environmental issues for students.

=== Ridelink ===
Ridelink seeks to reduce carbon emissions by the UCT community by promoting carpooling, bicycle use and public transport. A key component is the Campus Carpooling system – an online database that matches interested students up with others who live in their area. Campus Carpooling offers students an opportunity to save money on petrol, find parking more easily, and make new friends.

=== The Residence Project ===
One of the biggest producers of waste and consumers of energy at UCT are its residences. As they are home to thousands of students, they have a significant environmental impact. The GCI has helped set up recycling in catering and self-catering residences. Kitchens in the catering residences separate dry and wet waste, while there are separate bins in self-catering residences for recyclable and non-recyclable goods.

This portfolio also runs the annual Residence Energy Challenge.

=== Campus recycling ===
Recycling is very important at UCT – it produces up to 8 tonnes of waste on a daily basis. The GCI has been very involved with Properties and Services (management at UCT) in creating and implementing a recycling system on campus. All bins on Upper and Middle Campus have been grouped into stations and people are expected to throw their waste into the right bin. Waste is collected and taken to a sorting facility and UCT receives some of the revenue from recycled goods.

=== Events ===
Throughout the year, GCI organises events for the benefit of students. Such events include screenings of environmental documentary films, tree-planting days, talks by professionals in the environment field, and social gatherings for the purpose of contact-building.

=== Outreach ===
This is a new branch of the GCI, and includes participation with several schools around Cape Town.

=== Green Police ===
Through students in green overalls blowing whistles and teasing 'green-offenders', the Green Police adds an approach to environmental awareness. The GCI Green Police provide a visible presence at student events and seek to be an education platform for students, allowing them to ask questions and learn about the 'green movement'.

=== Building-to-building recycling ===
Not only is recycling necessary for the open areas on UCT's campus, but within the buildings as well. The Building-to-Building campaign aims to target buildings one by one by raising awareness of environmental challenges among staff, making suggestions on how to 'green' the building (such as setting up an in-house recycling system), decreasing water and electricity consumption, and encouraging carpooling. Initiatives started by staff members in the Botany and Kramer buildings on campus have become practical examples of what can be achieved with time and determination.

== Annual events ==
=== Orientation Week (February) ===
The arrival of thousands of new students to UCT poses the challenge of environmental education to the GCI. All incoming First-Years attend a GCI talk during their Faculty's orientation week programme. This presentation tells students about GCI, what it does, and how to become a volunteer, and introduces many of them to environmental issues such as climate change.

A GCI stand on Jameson Plaza during the orientation and registration week gives all the students an opportunity to discover more about GCI, as well as learn about projects that they might like to get involved in.

=== Green Bowls Championship (February) ===
During February, Green Bowls Day starts off the 'green' year for many residence students at UCT. Held at Mowbray Bowling Club for the first time in 2010, it was a considered a great success by all who partook.

=== Earth Hour (March) ===
Earth Hour started in 2007 in Sydney, Australia when 2.2 million individuals and more than 2,000 businesses turned their lights off for one hour to take a stand against climate change. Only a year later and Earth Hour had become a global sustainability movement with more than 50 million people across 35 countries participating.

Every Year, GCI does its bit for the promotion of Earth Hour.

- In 2009, GCI organised a candlelight music concert in Graça Machel Residence.
- In 2010, GCI hosted another concert. <update required here>

=== Residence Energy Challenge ===
An Energy Challenge, in partnership with Eskom, promotes energy saving and efficiency. Residences compete to reduce their total energy consumption in an allocated period of time. A prize is awarded to the residence that shows the biggest change. The GCI also works with House Committees to raise awareness about environmental issues within the residences.

=== Green Week (March) ===
The GCI Green Week is the biggest annual event that GCI organises. It is usually in March, and aims to highlight various 'green' issues. The week seeks to make all students aware of these issues through debates, screenings, interactive displays, an Expo which aims to inspire students and staff to take greater responsibility for their living footprint, and a band performance on Jameson Plaza amongst other things. Unconventional education methods, such as large structure displays on the campus and turning UCT's intranet website (called Vula) green, are used to ensure that as many students and staff members as possible are aware of the message behind Green Week. Green Week is also an opportunity to link with other universities and organisations.

== See also ==
- Green Campus Initiative, Harvard University
- Green Campus Initiative, University of Memphis
