= Adenike Oladosu =

Nigerian climate activist

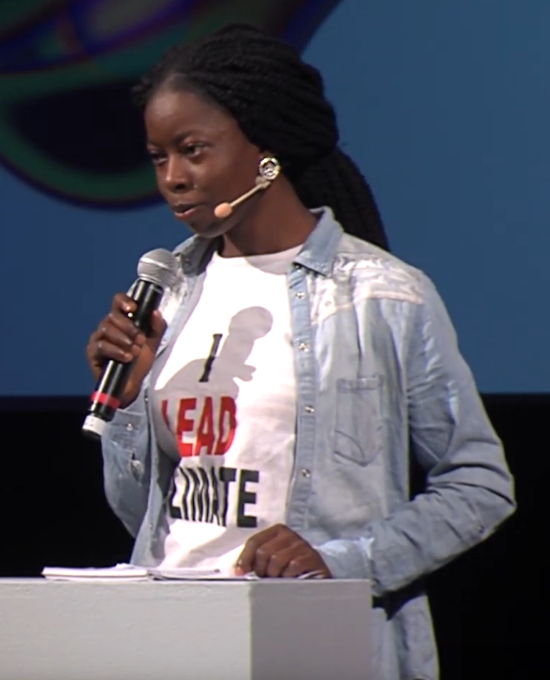
- Oladosu in 2020
- Born: Adenike Titilope Oladosu; 30 September 1994 (age 31); Abuja, Nigeria
- Education: University of Agriculture, Makurdi
- Occupation: Ecofeminist activist
- Years active: 2018–present
- Known for: Climate activism

Adenike Titilope Oladosu (born 1994) is a Nigerian climate activist, and initiator of the school strike for climate in Nigeria. She has showcased her climate action at international conferences including the UN Climate Change Conference, World Economic Forum, and Elevate festival in Graz-Austria.

In December 2019, Oladosu attended the COP25 gathering in Spain as a Nigerian youth diplomat where she gave a "moving address" about climate change in Africa and how it influences lives.

She currently serves as leader of the pan-African movement I Lead Climate Action Initiative.

== Biography ==
Oladosu is from Ogbomosho town in Oyo State, Nigeria. She got her early education at Government Secondary School, Gwagwalada, Abuja. Then she proceeded to the Federal University of Agriculture, Markurdi where she bagged a first class degree in Agricultural Economics.

Adenike Oladosu is one of Africa's most vocal environmental activists. Oladosu realized that there was a lack of knowledge about climate change on the continent. So she started her own pan- African climate justice movement.

In 2019, she was nominated for the first UN Youth Climate Summit in New York. Recognized by UNICEF Nigeria as a young change-maker, she’s leading a grassroots movement called ILeadClimate, advocating for the restoration of Lake Chad and youth involvement in climate justice through education. She has also been recognized by the Human Impact Institute (USA) as one of the 12 women standing for climate action in rural communities.

Oladosu served as a fellow at the New Institute in Hamburg, Germany, where she was involved in a program titled Black Feminism and the Polycrisis. She was recently invited to be an International Climate Protection Fellow at the Alexander von Humboldt Foundation in Bonn.

== Awards and recognitions ==
- Named one of "22 diverse voices to follow on Twitter this Earth Day" by Amnesty International.
- 15 ambassador of the African youth climate hub.
- She has been awarded the highest human rights award by Amnesty Nigeria for her fight for climate justice.
- In December 2024, Adenike Oladosu was included on the BBC's 100 Women list.
