= Ecotutu =

Nigeria cleantech company

- Type: Private
- Industry: Clean Technology
- Founded: 2020
- Founder: Babajide Oluwase (CEO), Michael Akinsete
- Headquarters: Nigeria
- Website: www.ecotutu.com

Ecotutu limited is a Nigeria-based company that provides solar-powered cold storage for large and small-scale farmers.

Ecotutu is amongst the major companies in Nigeria in agriculture/food and health cold value chain.

== History ==
Ecotutu is a Nigerian cleantech company focused on preserving fruits and vegetables in developing countries. It was founded in 2020 by Babajide Oluwase and Michael Akinsete.

In 2021, Ecotutu was listed among ten finalists for the United Nations World Food Programme (WFP).

In 2022, the company was named among the top three finalists at Global Entrepreneurship Summit and won the Zenith Bank FutureForward Tech Fair securing N20 million prize money.

== Operations ==
Ecotutu provide solar-powered food storage for farmers in Nigeria. The company operates a ‘pay-as-you-chill’ storage service for fruit and vegetable farmers, using solar-powered evaporation technology in Nigeria.

Ecotutu operates at multiple locations across states in Nigeria, offering cooling as a service in open markets and farm clusters.
