= Salem University, Lokoja =

Private university in Lokoja

Coordinates: 7.69433°N 6.72817°E

Salem University
- SU
- Motto: Raising Global Leaders
- Type: Private
- Established: 2007
- Chancellor: Dr. Sam Amaga
- Vice-Chancellor: Alewo Johnson Akubo
- Location: Lokoja, Kogi State, Nigeria
- Campus: Urban
- Colours: Blue, Purple
- Website: salemuniversity.edu.ng

Salem University, Lokoja is a privately owned university located in Lokoja, Kogi State, Nigeria. The institution was founded by Archbishop Sam Amaga, the president of Salem International Christian Center in 2007.

== History ==
Salem University is a private Christian university located in Lokoja, Kogi State, Nigeria. The institution was founded by Nigerian cleric and televangelist Archbishop Sam Amaga, the founder of Salem International Christian Centre.

The university received approval from the National Universities Commission (NUC) in 2007 as part of the expansion of private university education in Nigeria.

== Administration and Governance ==
=== List of Vice-Chancellors ===
Vice-Chancellors of Salem University
Vice-Chancellor	Tenure
Prof. Simon M. Irtwange	2007–2012
Prof. Alewo Johnson-Akubo	2012–2016
Prof. Ngozi Nma Odu	2016–2020
Prof. Alewo Johnson-Akubo	2020–present

== Campus ==
The University is situated on its only campus in Jimgbe, Lokoja, where all its academic activities take place. All undergraduate students also reside here.
