= Federal University of Technology Akure =

Public university in Akure, Nigeria

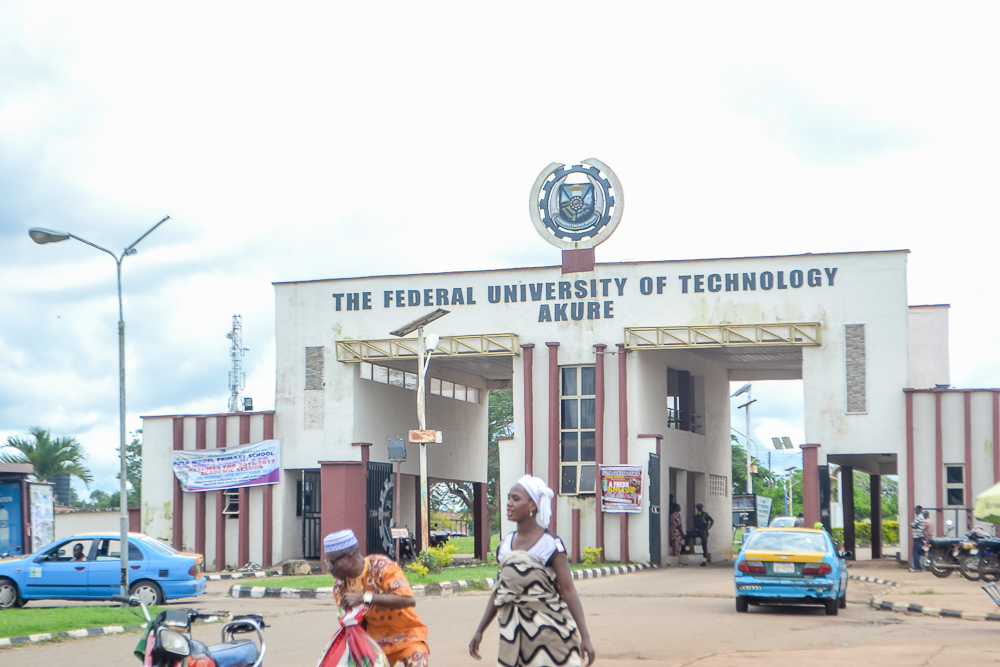
- FUTA Gate
- Motto: Technology for Self Reliance
- Type: Public
- Established: 1981; 45 years ago
- Chancellor: Alhaji (Dr.) Umar Faruk II, the Emir of Katagum
- Vice-Chancellor: Adenike Oladiji
- Administrative staff: 300
- Students: 31,078
- Undergraduates: 20,099
- Postgraduates: 10,979
- Location: Akure, Ondo State, Nigeria; 7.3037°N 5.1388°E
- Campus: Obanla, Obakekere and Centre for Entrepreneurship, Ibule + Expanse of land on Owo-Benin Road
- Colors: Purple
- Website: www.futa.edu.ng

The Federal University of Technology Akure (FUTA) is a federal government-owned university located in Akure, Ondo State, Nigeria. It was established in 1981 by the Federal Government of Nigeria.

== Administration and leadership ==
The current principal officers of the university administration include:

Office	Officeholder
Chancellor	The Emir of Katagum, Alhaji (Dr.) Umar Faruk II
Pro-Chancellor and Chairman	Senator (Prof.) Nora Ladi Daduut
Vice-Chancellor	Professor Adenike Oladiji
Deputy Vice-Chancellor (Academics, Research & Administration)	Professor Taiwo Timothy Amos
Deputy Vice-Chancellor (Development Services)	Professor Sunday Samuel Oluyamo
Registrar	Mr. Charles Olusegun Adeleye
Bursar	Mr. Peter Oladapo Osadugba
University Librarian	Dr. Robert Akinade Awoyemi

== Faculties ==
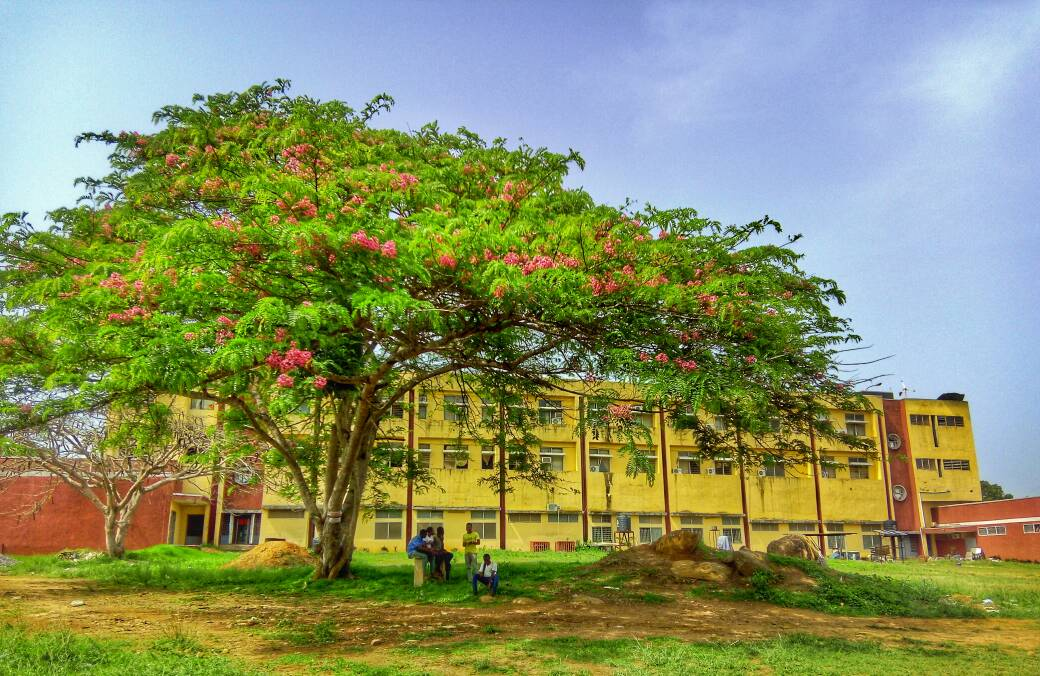
School of Engineering and Engineering Technology building

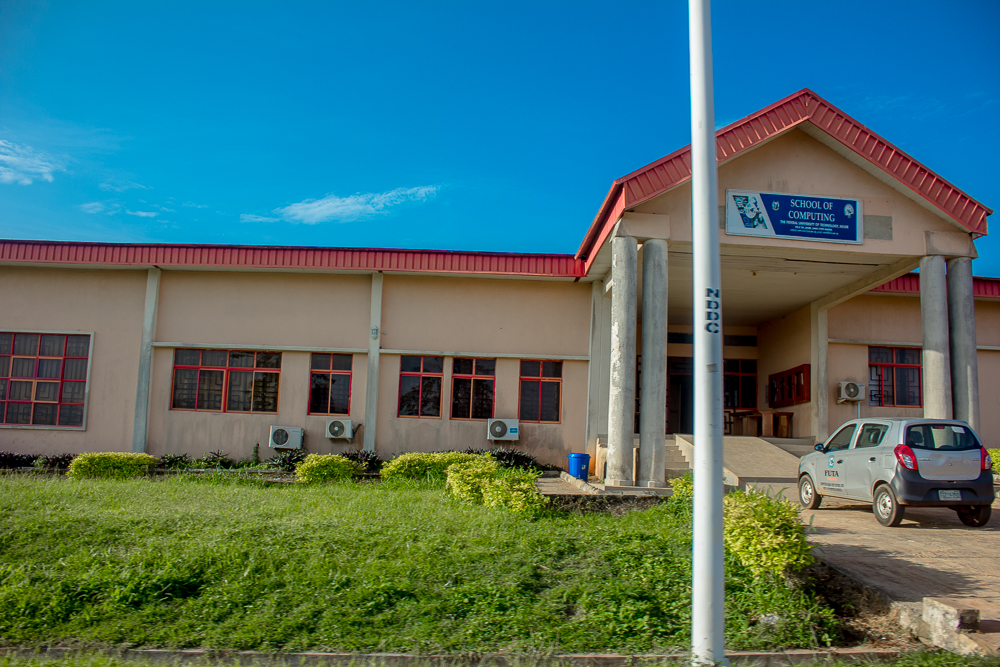
School of Computing building

The university has nine schools and a College of Health Sciences:

- College of Health Sciences.
- School of Basic Medical Sciences (SBMS).
- School of Clinical Sciences (SCS).
- School of Computing (SOC)
- School of Life Sciences (SLS).
- School of Physical Science (SPS).
- School of Earth and Mineral Sciences (SEMS), with departments including Applied geophysics, Marine science and technology, Meteorological and Climate Science, Remote Sensing, and Geoinformatics Sciences.
- School of Environmental Technology (SET).
- School of Electrical and Systems Engineering (SESE)
- School of Infrastructural, Minerals and Manufacturing Engineering (SIMME)
- School of Agriculture and Agricultural Technology (SAAT).
- School of Logistics and Innovation Technology (SLIT).
- School of Postgraduate Studies (SPGS).

The institution offers pre-degree science programs, short-term courses and University Advanced Basic Science programmes.

== Library ==
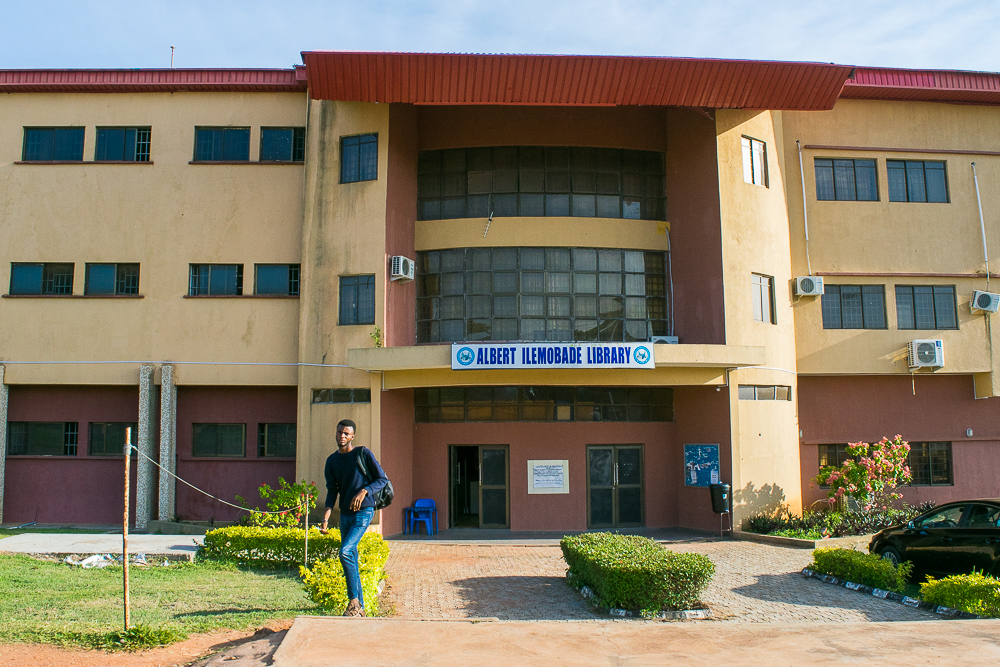
Front view of Albert Ilemobade Library, FUTA

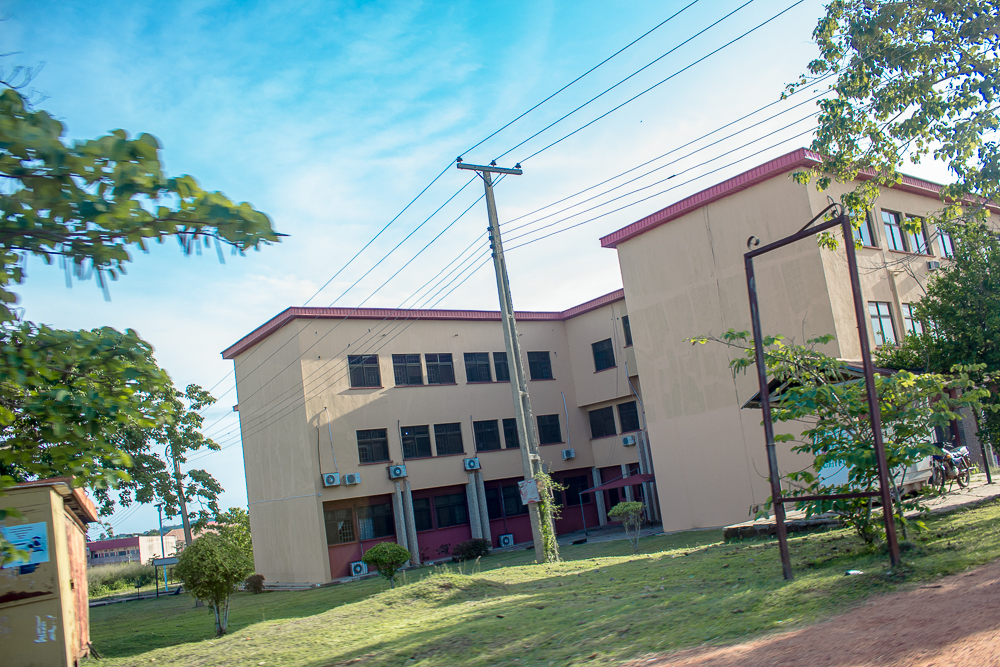
Albert Ilemobade Library, Federal University of Technology, Akure

The Albert Ilemobade Library is the main university library of Federal University of Technology Akure and is located beside the School of Engineering and Engineering Technology on the main campus. Students are required to register during their first year of study to access library services.

The library is named after Professor Albert Ilemobade, the university’s second vice-chancellor. It was established in 1982 at the former library complex on the mini campus. In April 2006, the library was relocated to its current permanent facility, a two-story building with a total floor area of approximately 1,614.74 square metres (about 17,380 square feet) and seating for up to 2,500.

Access to the library is available to senior staff, enrolled students and alumni of the university. The facility also admits external users for approved academic or research purposes, subject to the presentation of a letter of introduction from an authorized official, such as a faculty dean, head of department from the visitor’s institution, or the director of an organization.

== Student organizations and clubs ==
FUTA offers a wide variety of student organizations and clubs, including the Student Union Government (SUG), professional and academic societies, cultural and arts clubs, and the Cultural and Drama Society.

The FUTA Student Union (FUTASU) serves as a platform for students to voice their concerns, advocate for their rights, and participate in decision-making processes. The student union collaborates with the university management to enhance the quality of education and promote student welfare.All students enrolled in the university are members of the union.

The university operates a radio station, FUTA Radio (93.1MHz) on campus. Programmes include a morning news bulletin, a talk show on education, a music program, a special segment highlighting achievements and success stories of students, faculty, and alumni, and a podcast on social issues.

FUTA has more than 200 registered clubs and student organizations, including social and community service clubs, the Space Club, sports clubs, entrepreneurial and innovation groups, and hobby and special-interest clubs. These organizations aim to enrich the student's experience, support personal development, and foster a sense of belonging within the university's community.

== Student services and support ==
FUTA provides academic advice, counselling and psychological support, basic health care, and career development services. Additional offerings include financial aid and scholarships, disability support, student engagement programs, extracurricular activities, and resources aimed at supporting students’ academic and personal development.

== Research ==
FUTA hosts research teams engaged in academic and scientific disciplines. These teams include faculty members, researchers, and students. Notable examples include:

- Engineering and Technology
- Agricultural and Environmental
- Health and Biomedical
- Science and Technology
- Earth and Mineral Sciences
- Social Sciences and Humanities

=== Engineering and Technology ===
FUTA's engineering and technology division focuses on advancements in fields such as civil engineering, mechanical engineering, electrical engineering, computer science, and more. These researchers explore areas such as renewable energy, sustainable infrastructure, robotics, artificial intelligence, computer networks, software engineering, and emerging technologies.

=== Agricultural and Environmental ===
FUTA's agricultural and environmental division conducts research to enhance agricultural practices, sustainable food production, and environmental conservation. Researchers in this team focus on areas such as crop science, soil science, plant breeding, agricultural engineering, environmental management, and biodiversity conservation.

=== Health and Biomedical Research Team ===
FUTA's health and biomedical division focuses on research related to healthcare, biomedical sciences, and public health. These researchers explore areas such as medical diagnostics, drug discovery, health systems, epidemiology, health informatics, and healthcare technology.

=== Science and Technology Research Team ===
FUTA's science and technology research team encompasses various scientific disciplines, including Chemistry, Physics, Mathematics, Biology, and Bioinformatics. Researchers in this team investigate areas such as materials science, nanotechnology, computational modelling, mathematical modelling, biotechnology, and biodiversity. Their research contributes to scientific discoveries, technological advancements, and a deeper understanding of the fundamental principles of natural science.

=== Social Sciences and Humanities Research Team ===
FUTA also has a research team focused on social sciences and humanities disciplines. Researchers in this team explore areas such as economics, sociology, psychology, language studies, history, and cultural studies.

== Vice-chancellors ==
The Vice-chancellors since 1981 include:

- Theodore Idibiye Francis (1981–1987)
- Albert Adeoye Ilemobade (1987–1995)
- Lawrence Babatope Kolawole (1996–1999)
- Ekundayo Adeyinka Adeyemi (acting; January 2000 – September 2001)
- Robert Adebowale Ogunsusi (acting; October 2001 – December 2001)
- Peter Olufemi Adeniyi (January 2002 – December 2006)
- Adebisi Mojeed Balogun (January 2007 – January 2012)
- Emmanuel Adedayo Fashakin (acting; February 2012 – May 2012)
- Adebiyi Gregory Daramola (May 2012 – May 2017)
- Joseph Adeola Fuwape (May 2017 – May 2022)
- Adenike Temidayo Oladiji (24 May 2022 – present)

== Notable alumni ==
- Igbekele Ajibefun, Ondo State Commissioner for Education, Science and Technology
- Adenike Akinsemolu, environmental sustainability advocate and social entrepreneur
- Alaba Akintola, Nigerian track and field athlete
- Opeyemi Gbenga Kayode (Pepenazi), hip-hop singer and songwriter
- Taibat Lawanson, Professor of Urban Planning, University of Liverpool
- Babajide Oluwase, founder of Ecotutu
- Gideon Guitar, Guitarist

== See also ==
- List of universities in Nigeria
- Education in Nigeria
