= Ikenne Residence of Chief Obafemi Awolowo =

Museum in Nigeria

The Ikenne Residence of Chief Obafemi Awolowo represents the hometown of the late Chief Obafemi Awolowo. The structure is located in Ikenne, Ogun state, south west Nigeria. The remains of Obafemi and Hannah Idowu Dideolu Awolowo(HID) were buried in this compound.

The compound consists of a Mausoleum where they were buried. The Museum harbored some of his personal effects, which are displayed for tourism. As part of the museum is the Mercedes-Benz E-Class (W212) used in 1979 and 1983 campaign for his political ambition. The Efunyela hall was built in the memory of his late mother chief (mrs) Efunyela Awolowo. The hall is used for reception of visitors and for hosting major functions. It also has a worship sanctuary called the Embassy of the most high. The building also has a library called Sopolu Library built in remembrance of his late father.

== Background ==
The buildings and all the structures in Awo's compound represent the hometown of Chief Obafemi Awolowo, where he lived before his death.

One of the structures in the compound is Efunyela Hall which was commissioned in the year 1979 in memory of his late mother, Chief (Mrs) Efunyela Awolowo. The hall serves as reception and hosting of family functions. The compound also hosts a museum with a figure of old eight sitter Mercedes Benze used in 1979 and 1983 for his political campaign. The car was purchased in the year 1970. Aside the car are some other valuable items of memorial importance which include honorary academic gowns from University of Cape Town, University of Ibadan and University of Lagos and also the Awo's Cap. The museum was built on 4 August 1989.

== Photo gallery ==
Late Chief Obafemi Awolowo Residence

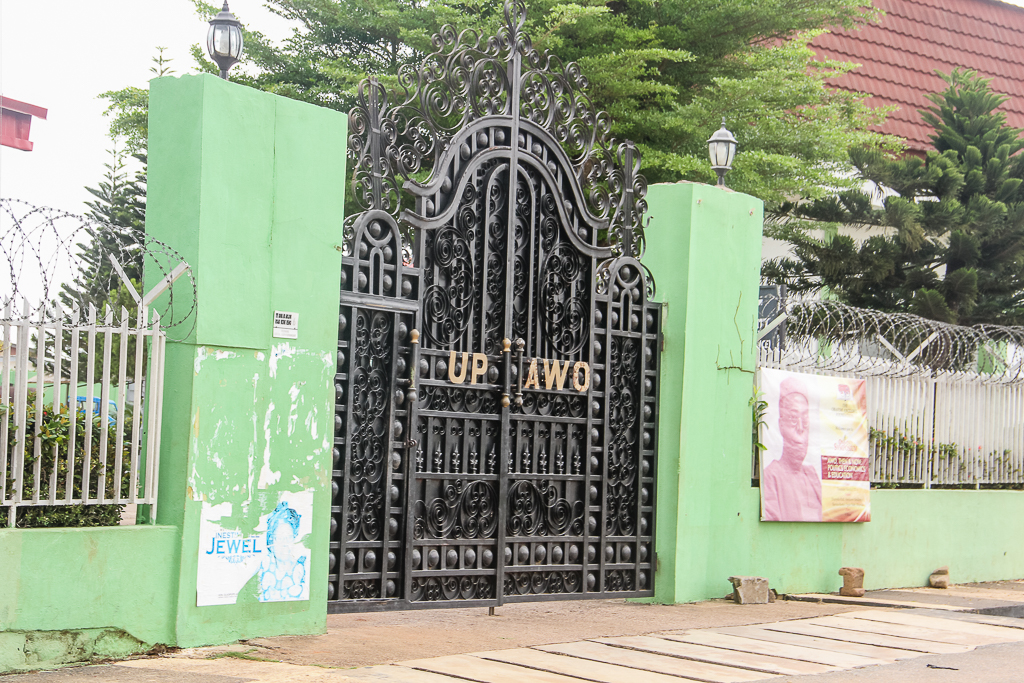
Obafemi Awolowo House Gate, Ikenne, Ogun state

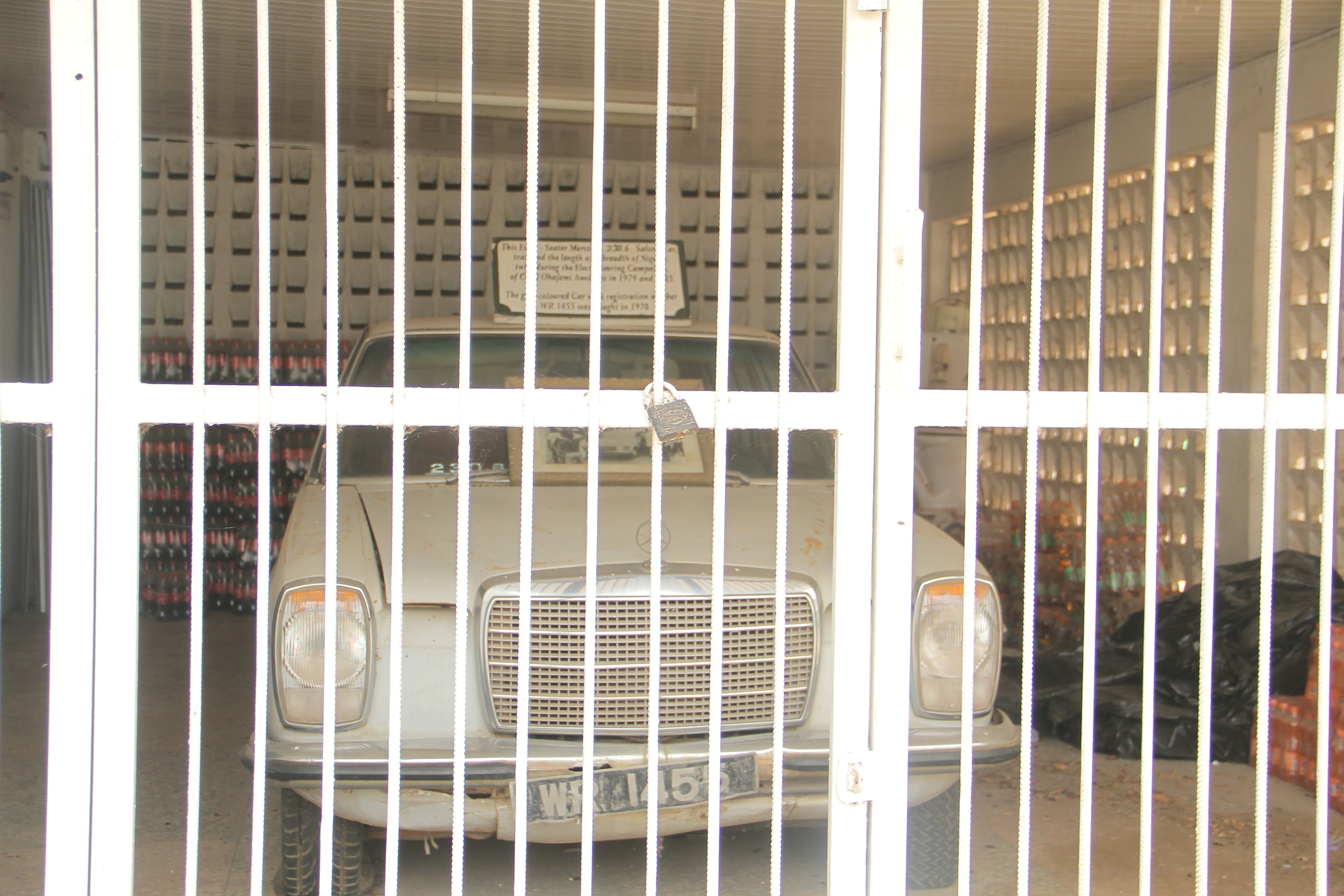
Obafemi Awolowo's car

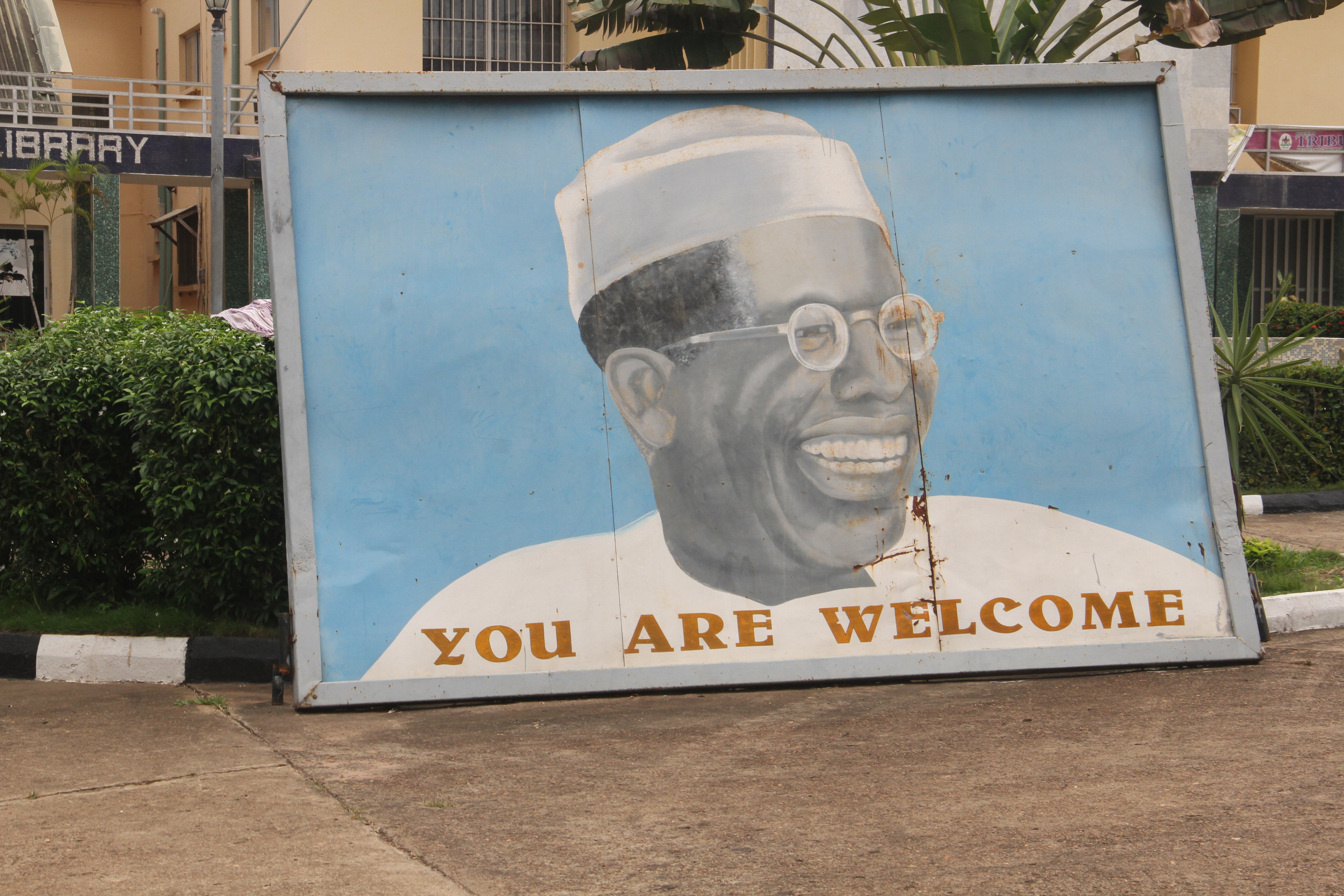
Obafemi Awolowo Drawing

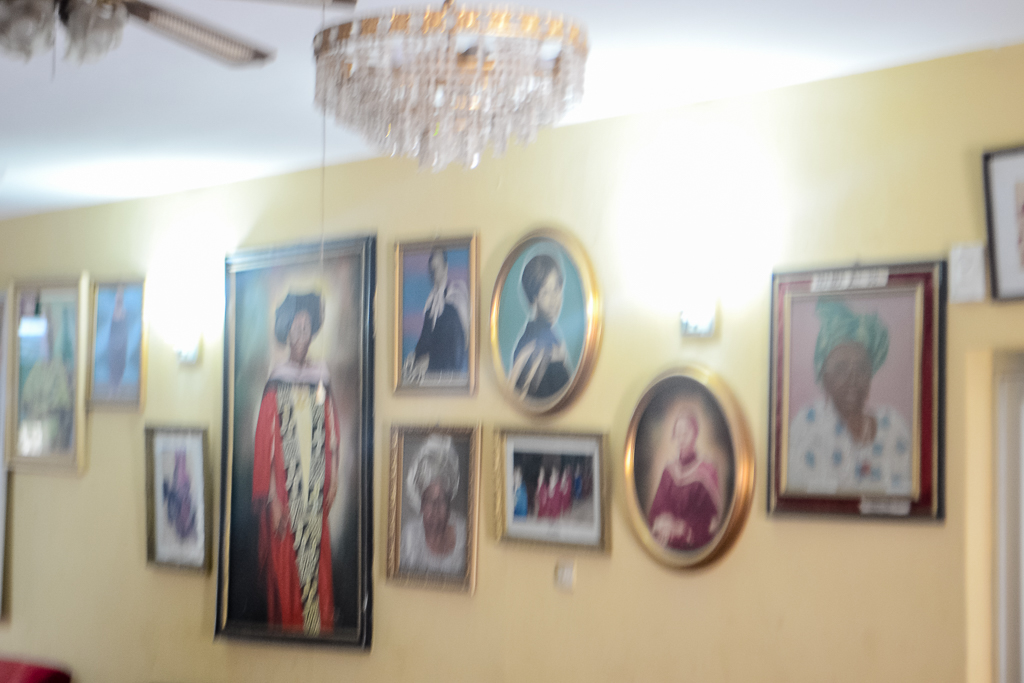
Obafemi Awolowo House interior

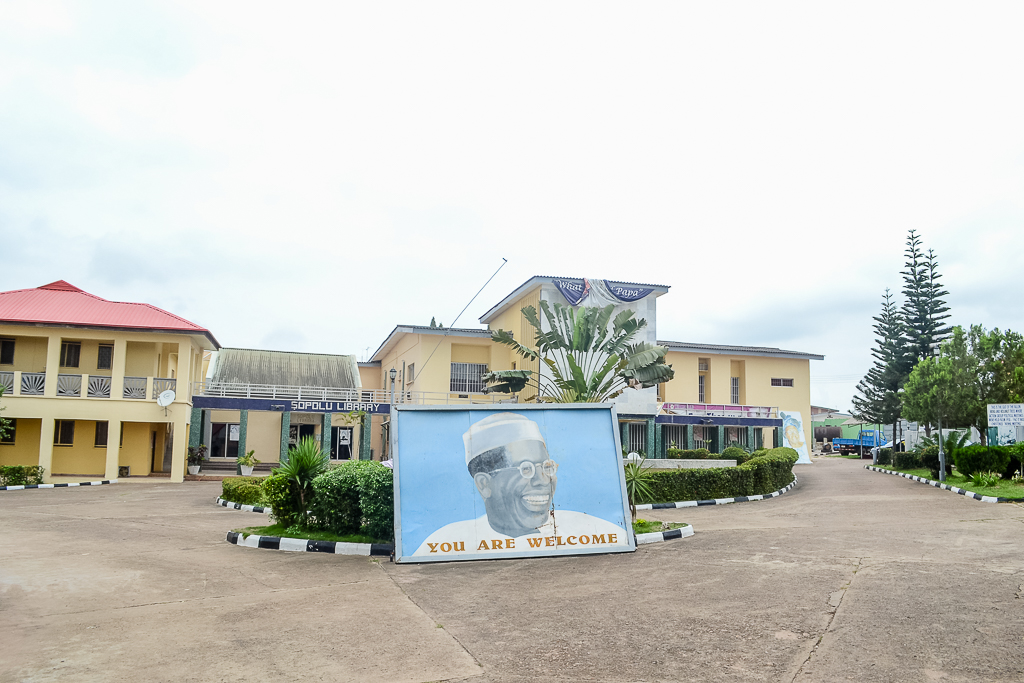
Obafemi Awolowo House Large image of Chief Oabefemi Awolowo

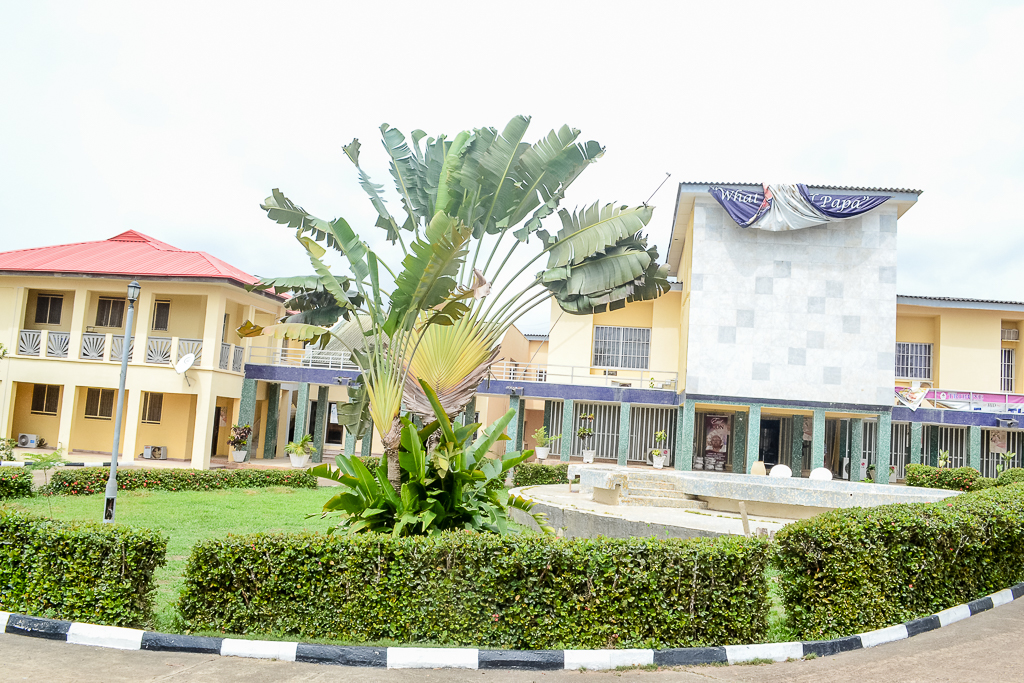
Obafemi Awolowo House main compound

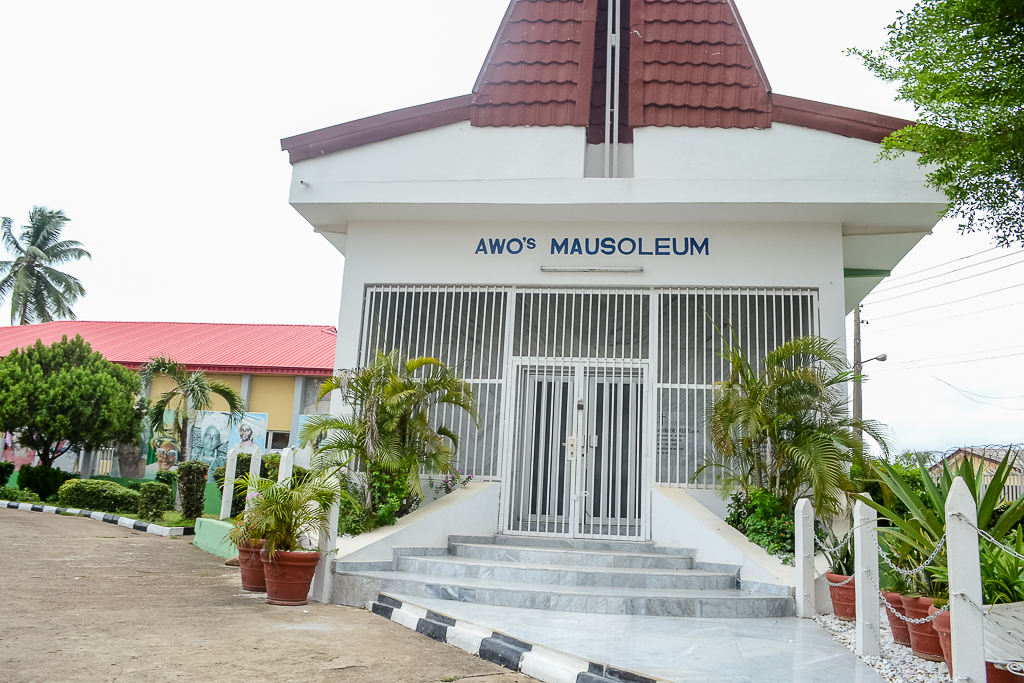
Obafemi Awolowo House Mausoleum

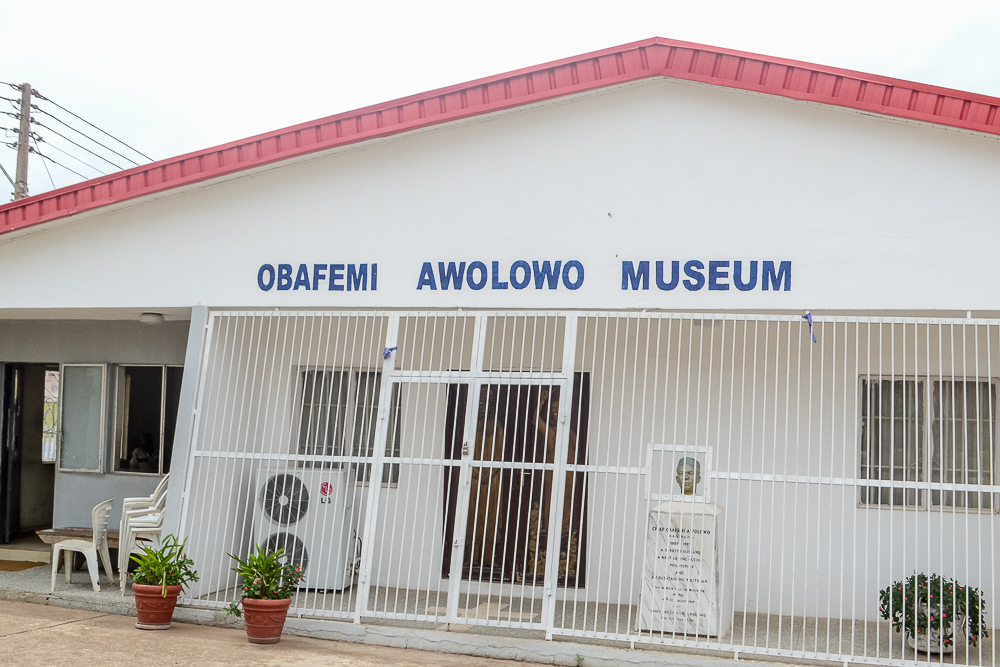
Obafemi Awolowo Museum side view

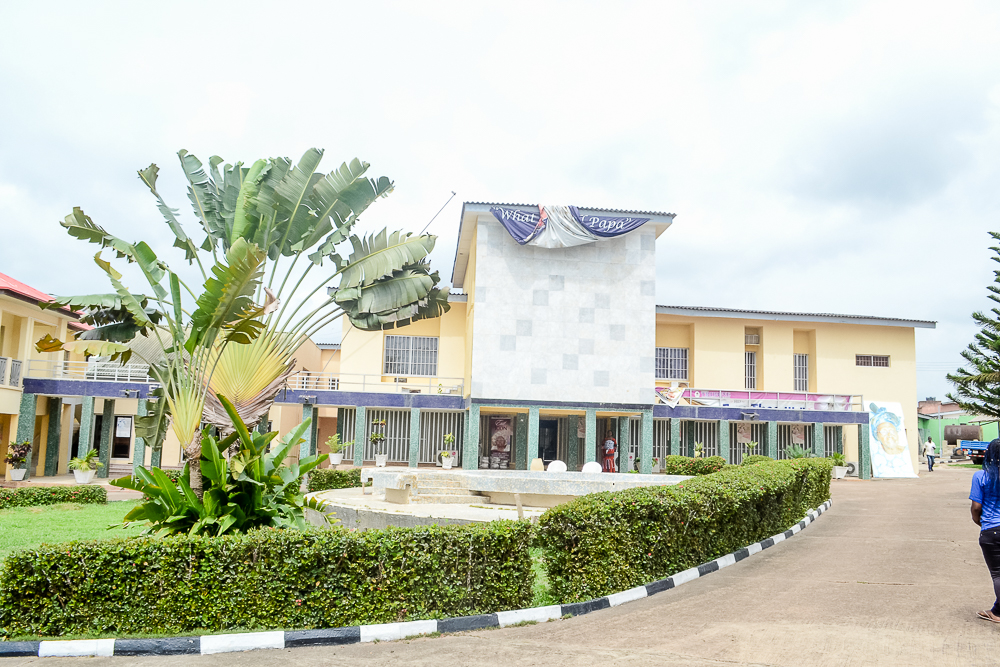
Obafemi Awolowo House

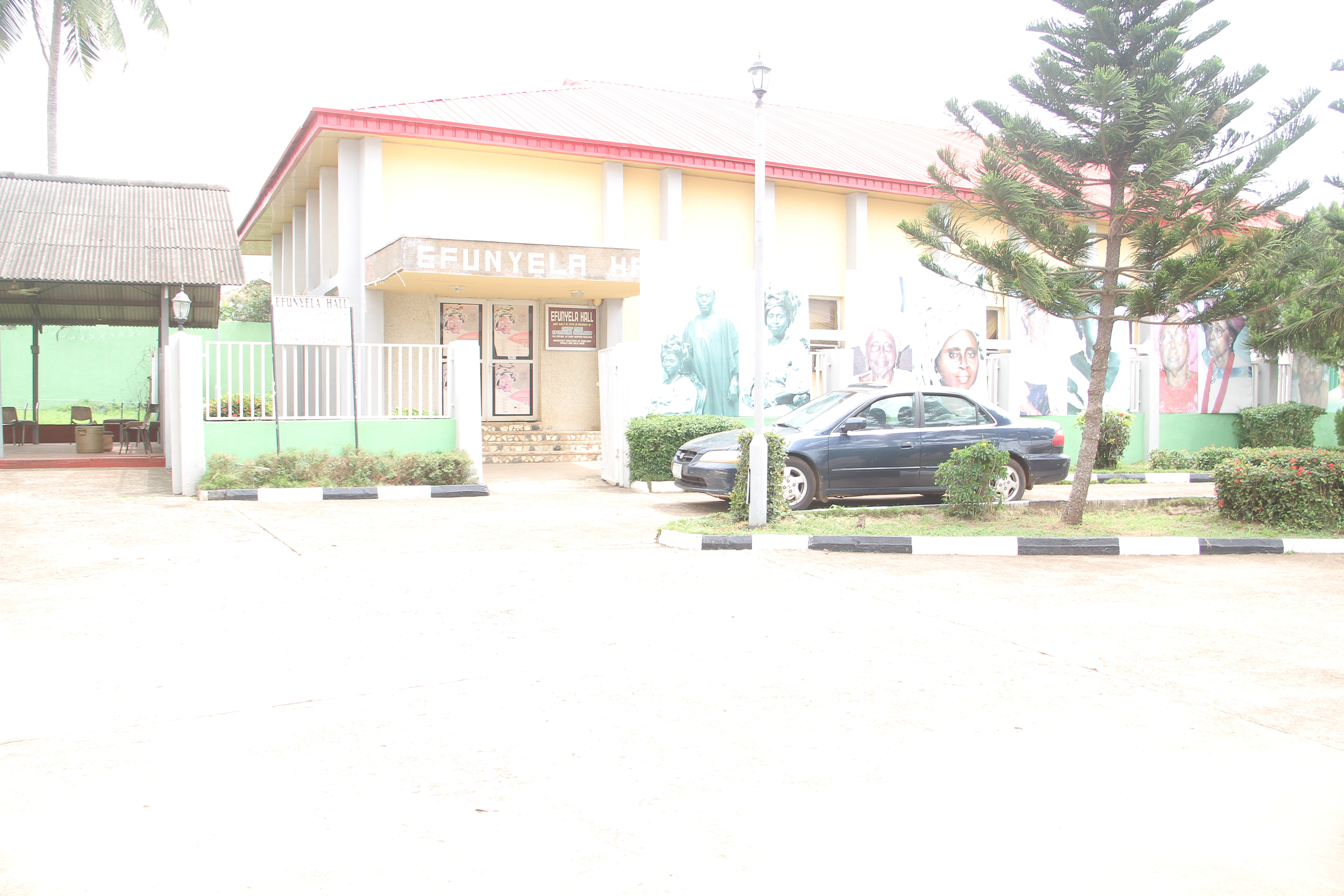
Efunyela Hall

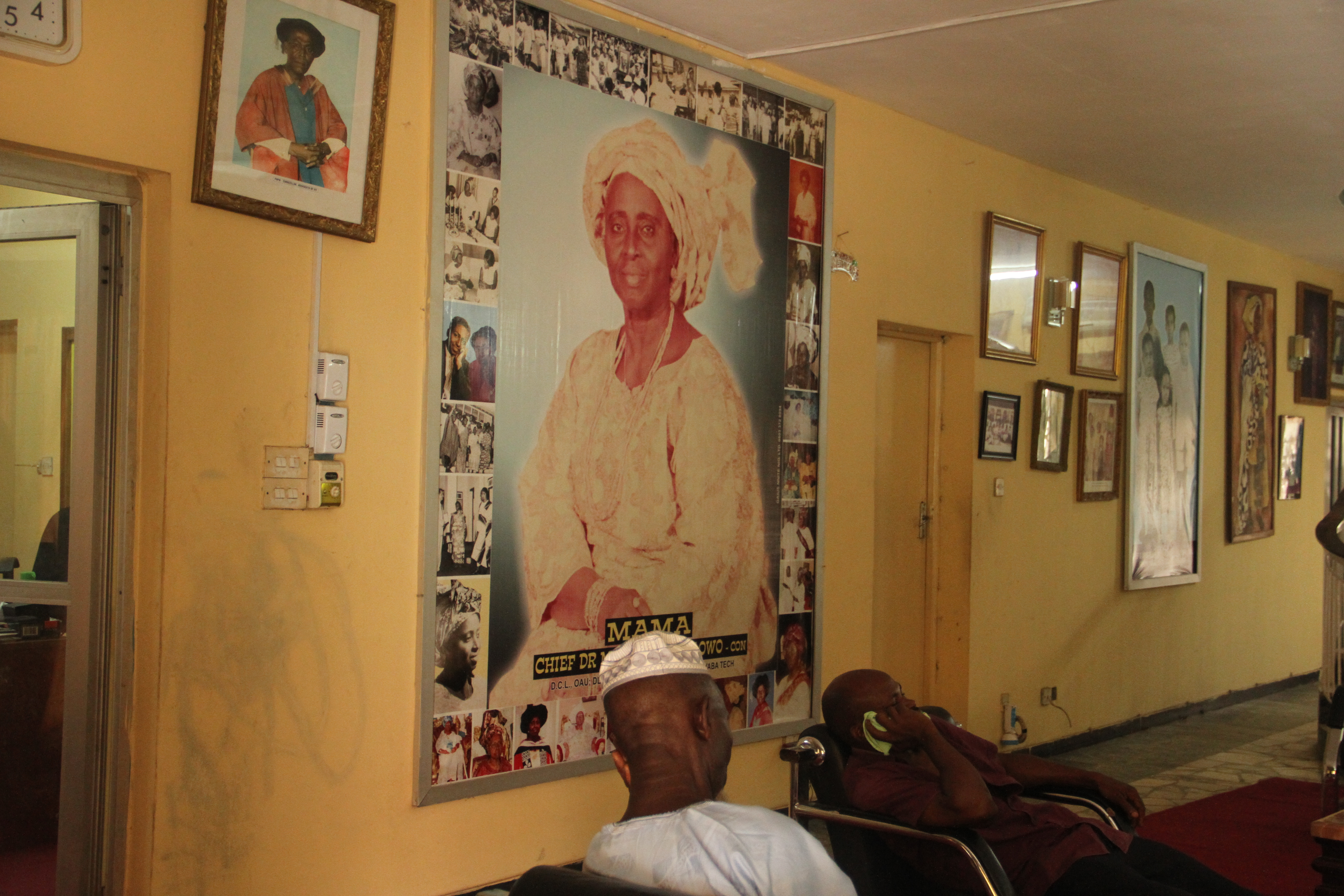
Chief Obafemi Awolowo Residence

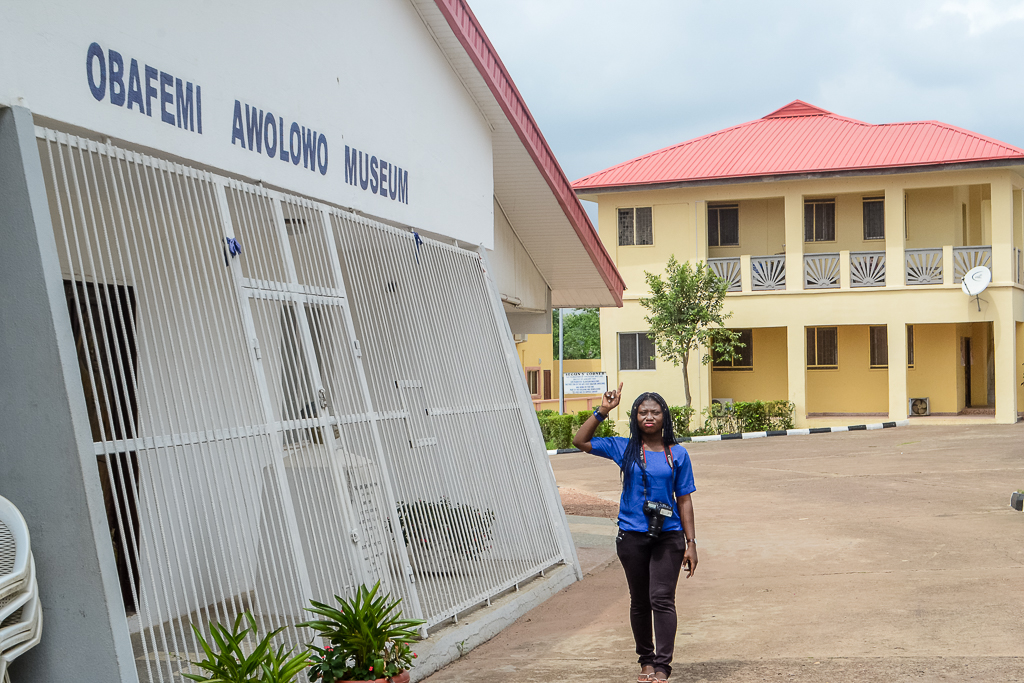
Chief of Obafemi Awolowo Museum at Ikene, Ogun State

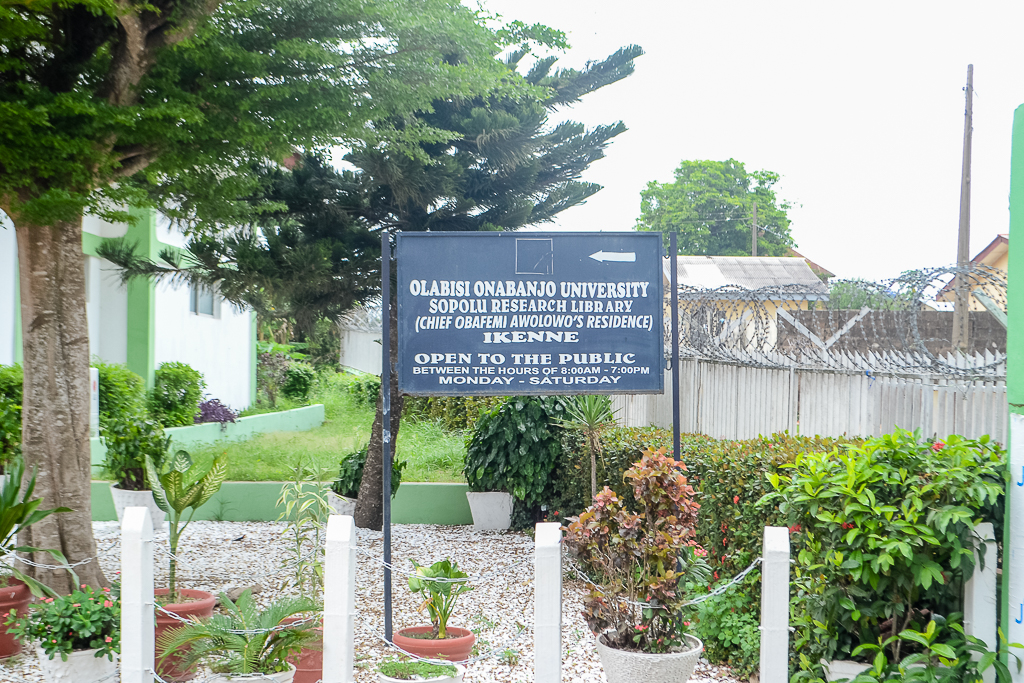
Chief Obafemi Awolowo Residence, Olabisi Onobanjo University, Sopolu Research Library

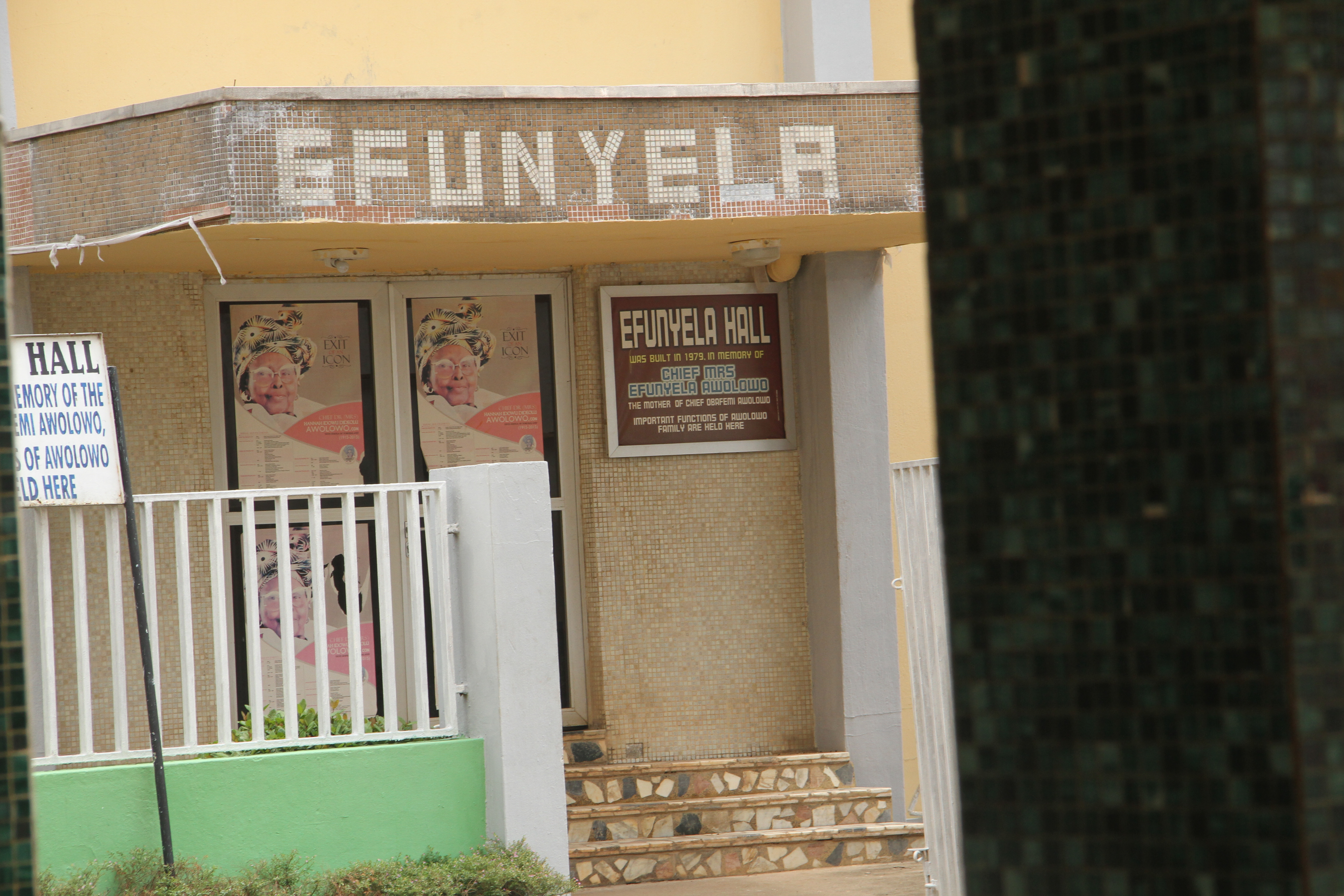
Efunyela Hall 1
