= Kiki Osinbajo =

Nigerian lawyer

- Born: 18 March 1993 (age 33)
- Citizenship: Nigerian
- Education: Aston University
- Occupation: Lawyer
- Parents: Yemi Osinbajo (father); Dolapo Osinbajo (mother)
- Awards: Award of Excellence for Lifestyle
- Website: kikiosinbajo.com

Olukonyinsola Osinbajo (born March 18, 1993), best known as Kiki Osinbajo, is a lawyer and entrepreneur. She is the CEO and founder of Ciar, a fashion brand and skincare brand Konyin. She is also the daughter of Nigeria's former Vice President and Second Lady, Yemi Osinbajo and Dolapo Osinbajo.

== Education ==
Kiki Osinbajo obtained a degree in law at the Aston University, Birmingham, United Kingdom.

== Career ==
Osinbajo made her intention of venturing into a career line of fashion as opposed to the legal profession. She established a fashion store in 2017 called Glam'd Africa and floated a skincare line along called Konyin. According to Kiki, the company is poised to become a one-stop facility catering to a broad range of tastes and styles in beauty and skincare. In 2022, Kiki renamed her clothing company from Glam'd Africa to Ciar.

Kiki Osinbajo has also in many occasions advocated against gender violence, molestation and also against police brutality. She took to her Instagram page alongside Zahra Buhari, daughter of President Buhari during the END SARS protest to advocate against police brutality.

== Controversy ==
In July 2020, A Nigerian US-based blogger named Jackson Ude alleged that Kiki Osinbajo owned a property in highbrow Wuse area of Abuja worth 800 million naira (533 thousand dollars). However this claim was debunked by Osinbajo as she stated that she was merely a tenant in the property. This claim was also refuted by the owner of the property, affirming that Kiki Osinbajo was his tenant.

In November 2022, a Liberian blogger on tiktok accused Osinbajo of being arrested in the UK. The blogger also debunked his own allegations stating it was due to a misinformation. This accusation was also denied by the Nigerian Presidency.

== Personal life ==
Kiki Osinbajo was born to the family of Professor Yemi Osinbajo and Dolapo Osinbajo. She has two siblings namely Oluwadamilola and Fiyinfunoluwa Osinbajo.
