= Ade Ipaye =

Nigerian lawyer (born 1963)

Ade Ipaye OFR

Deputy Chief of Staff to the President
- In office September 2015 – 29 May 2023
- President: Muhammadu Buhari
- Vice President: Yemi Osinbajo
- Preceded by: Ali Kachalla Abubakar
- Succeeded by: Ibrahim Hadejia

Attorney General of Lagos State
- In office May 2011 – May 2015
- Governor: Babatunde Fashola
- Preceded by: Supo Shasore
- Succeeded by: Adeniji Kazeem

Personal details
- Born: Adeola Rahman Ipaye; 8 June 1963 (age 63) Lagos, Nigeria
- Spouse: Olaitan Ipaye
- Children: 3
- Education: Igbobi College; University of Lagos (LL.B., LL.M.)
- Occupation: Lawyer

Adeola Rahman Ipaye OFR (born 8 June 1963) is a Nigerian lawyer who served as the deputy chief of staff to the president of Nigeria (office of the vice president) from 2015 to 2023. He was also attorney general and commissioner for justice in Lagos State from 2011 to 2015.

== Education ==
For his primary education, Ipaye attended Ahmad Memorial Primary School, and St. Saviours Primary School at Agege, Lagos, between 1969 and 1975. He then moved to Lagos African Church Grammar School, Ifako, Agege, where he obtained the West African School Leaving Certificate ('O' Levels) in 1979. He was subsequently admitted into Igbobi College Lagos for Advanced Level Studies, which he completed in 1981. After a first degree (B.A. Hons) in History (1984), Ipaye obtained both bachelor's and master's degrees in Law, all from the University of Lagos, Akoka, Lagos.

== Career ==
He began his career at Oditah Adebiyi & Co., Ikoyi, Lagos as a Legal Practitioner and Research Coordinator before he joined the services of the University of Lagos as an Assistant Lecturer.

He rose to the position of a Senior Lecturer in October 1999 and later became the Sub-Dean of the Faculty of Law, University of Lagos in October 2000.

In May 2001 he was appointed Special Assistant to the Governor of Lagos State Bola Tinubu on Legal Affairs and in 2003, working with the then Attorney General & Commissioner for Justice, Professor Yemi Osinbajo. He later became the Governor's Senior Special Assistant on Legal Matters. and served in that capacity for four years until he was appointed a member of the Lagos State Executive Council and Special Adviser on Taxation and Revenue to the Governor Babatunde Fashola who succeeded Bola Tinubu in 2007.

As Special Adviser, he spearheaded several reforms in the area of taxation, including the establishment of the Lagos Internal Revenue Service by State Law as an independent entity, outside the State civil service structure, with special rules and conditions of service. He also supported the State Team to expand taxation of the informal sector and the harmonise of local government taxes.

In May 2007, Ipaye was appointed Attorney General. Ipaye established the Community Service Unit for Lagos State and activated for the first time the legal provision for Community Service as a sentencing option.

On 3 September 2015, President Muhammadu Buhari appointed Ipaye as Deputy Chief of Staff, in which capacity he serves as Chief of Staff to the Vice President, Professor Yemi Osinbajo, SAN.

On 11 October 2022, Ipaye was conferred with National Honours and designated Officer of the Order of the Federal Republic (OFR) by President Muhammadu Buhari, GCFR.
