= Hairat Balogun =

Nigerian lawyer (born 1941)

Hairat Aderinsola Balogun, née Alatishe, OON (born 1941) is a Nigerian lawyer, the first female Attorney General of Lagos State.

== Early life and education ==
Hairat Balogun was born on 10 October 1941, the daughter of a well-off Muslim cocoa buyer Alhaji Jinodu Alatishe (The Balogun Of Ijebuland). She travelled to the United Kingdom aged twelve to attend secondary school there, before studying for the bar at Lincoln's Inn. She was called to the English bar, aged 21, on 5 February 1963 and to the Nigerian bar on 13 July 1963. In 1981 she was elected as the first Secretary-General of the Nigerian Bar Association, and held the office until 1983.

== Legal career ==
Balogun had a long legal career spanning several decades. She practised law, worked in public service, and later became one of Nigeria’s most prominent female jurists. She was involved in legal reforms, public legal administration, and professional legal bodies in Nigeria.

Hairat Balogun is a Life-Bencher and was the first female Chairman of the Body of Benchers. She was also the first female member of the council of the International Bar Association. She is a Life Member of the International Federation of Women Lawyers (FIDA). She was made Officer of the Order of Niger for services rendered to the Nigerian legal profession.

In 2011, she published her legal memoirs. In 2012 she became the first female president of the Rotary Club of Lagos and held the presidency until 2013. In 2016 she was recognized with an award in the Nigerian Legal Awards (NLA).

== Chief Judge of Lagos State (1999–2001) ==
Hairat Balogun served as the Chief Judge of Lagos State from 1999 to 2001, during Nigeria’s return to democratic rule. She was responsible for overseeing the administration of justice in Lagos State, ensuring court operations ran effectively during a major political transition period. Her tenure is officially listed in the Lagos State Judiciary historical records of Chief Judges.

== Judicial contributions ==
During her time in public service and judicial leadership, Balogun contributed to legal administration reforms and supported the development of court processes in Lagos State. She also participated in professional legal organisations and advisory roles in Nigeria’s justice system.

== Retirement and later life ==
After serving as Chief Judge, she continued contributing to legal development and professional organisations in Nigeria. She later engaged in legal writing and professional mentorship.

== Legacy ==
Hairat Balogun is widely regarded as one of the prominent female figures in Nigeria’s judiciary. Her service as Chief Judge of Lagos State is considered significant in strengthening judicial administration during Nigeria’s democratic transition period. She is also recognised for her contributions to legal education, professional development, and women’s participation in law.

== Works ==
- To Serve in Truth and Justice, 2011

== See also ==
- Judiciary of Nigeria
- Lagos State Judiciary
