= Moyosore Onigbanjo =

Nigerian lawyer (born 1964)

Moyosore Onigbanjo SAN

Attorney General of Lagos State
- In office 22 August 2019 – 13 September 2023
- Governor: Babajide Sanwo-Olu
- Preceded by: Mosediq Adeniji Kazeem
- Succeeded by: Lawal Pedro

Personal details
- Born: Moyosore Jubril Onigbanjo; 24 September 1964 (age 61) Surulere, Lagos, Nigeria
- Education: University of Ilorin; Obafemi Awolowo University (LL.B.); Harvard Law School; Nigerian Law School
- Occupation: Lawyer

Moyosore Jubril Onigbanjo SAN (born 24 September 1964) is a Nigerian lawyer and a Senior Advocate of Nigeria (SAN). He served as attorney general and commissioner for justice of Lagos State from 2019 to 2023.

== Early life and education ==
Moyosore Jubril Onigbanjo, was born to a middle-class family on 24 September 1964 in Surulere, Lagos. He attended Sunnyfield Primary school, and later St' Finbarr's College, Yaba, He gained admission and studied law at the University of Ilorin in 1983 but earned his LLB Hons degree in 1988 from Obafemi Awolowo University, Ile-Ife after the faculty was cancelled at University of Ilorin in 1986 by the National Universities Commission, he then went to Harvard Law School for two Executive Courses on Negotiation and Leadership and thereafter, Difficult Conversation both in 2017.

== Career ==
He was called to bar by the Nigerian Law School in 1989. Onigbanjo was an NYSC corp member when he cut his legal teeth at Akin Delana & Co. in Ibadan, and then became an associate with Professor A.B Kasumu. He was appointed a Notary Public on 31 March 2001 and later appointed Council Member of the Nigerian Bar Association (NBA) Section on Business Law (SBL) on 30 March 2011. He was a member of the National Executive Committee of the NBA between 2010 and 2012, in September 2013, Hon. Justice Aloma Mariam Mukhtar GCON conferred on him with the rank of Senior Advocate of Nigeria. On 22 August 2019, he was sworn in by Governor Babajide Sanwo-Olu as the 16th Attorney General and Commissioner for Justice of Lagos State where he served his 4 year term until 13 September 2023.
