= Supo Shasore =

Nigerian lawyer (born 1964)

Olasupo Shasore SAN

Attorney General of Lagos State
- In office 2007–2011
- Governor: Babatunde Fashola
- Preceded by: Yemi Osinbajo
- Succeeded by: Ade Ipaye

Personal details
- Born: Olasupo Shasore; 22 January 1964 (age 62) Lagos Island, Lagos, Nigeria
- Spouse: Gbemi Shasore
- Children: 3
- Education: Obafemi Awolowo University (LL.B.); University of Lagos (LL.M.)
- Alma mater: Federal Government College, Ijanikin; Igbobi College
- Profession: Lawyer
- Website: www.olasuposhasore.company

Olasupo Shasore SAN (born 22 January 1964) is a Nigerian lawyer, born in Lagos, Nigeria to the Shasore family, an indigenous chieftaincy family of Isale Eko. He is the founding partner in the law firm of Africa Law Practice NG & Co, a corporate commercial law firm in Nigeria. A Senior Advocate of Nigeria (SAN) and a Fellow of the Chartered Institute of Arbitrators. He was Attorney General & Commissioner for Justice of Lagos State from 2007 to 2011.

== Education ==
Shasore attended the Federal Government College Lagos and Igbobi College, Lagos, before studying law at the University of Ife (now Obafemi Awolowo University) graduating with an LL.B in 1986 followed by a Bachelor of Laws from Nigerian Law School in 1987. He then achieved an LL.M through the University of Lagos in 1990.

== Career ==
He was called to the Nigerian Bar on 22 October 1987; became a member of the Inner Bar and conferred with the rank of Senior Advocate of Nigeria (SAN) in 2006; Fellow of the Chartered Institute of Arbitrators (United Kingdom) 2007; former member of the Body of Benchers of Nigeria; Notary Public for Nigeria; President of the Lagos Court of Arbitration (LCA) (until January 2016); Chairman of the Lagos State Law Reform Commission (until 2015); member/secretary of the Presidential Petroleum Revenue Special Taskforce (2013); led Lagos State delegates at National Constitutional conference (2014).

As Attorney General & Commissioner for Justice, Lagos State, he led the review of the Criminal Code Law, and the Administration of Criminal Justice Law; authored and issued the first Prosecutors' Guidelines (2011); initiated the first African Regional Conference of the International Association of Prosecutors (IAP). Chaired the Mortgage and Property Law Reform Committee, which produced and recommended the Mortgage & Property Law (2009). He also authored the Home Ownership and Mortgage Policy (2011). He also initiated the policy and crafted the tenant friendly Tenancy Law of Lagos State, balancing the inequality between landlords and tenants.

== Writings ==
He is also an historian and author; his recent books include Ministering Justice: Administration of Justice in Nigeria (Qbooks, 2019); Platter of Gold: Making Nigeria (2016), which inspired a seven-part docuseries titled Journey of an African Colony; Possessed – A History of Law & Justice in the Crown Colony of Lagos (2014); Commercial Arbitration – Arbitration Law & International Practice in Nigeria (Lexis Nexis, 2011), Johnson and Shasore; Jurisdiction & Sovereign Immunity in Nigerian Commercial Law (Practice and textbook) (2007, NIIA).

== Personal life ==
Shasore is married with three children.
