= Hannah Awolowo =

Nigerian businesswoman and politician (1915–2015)

Chief Hannah Awolowo

Spouse of the Premier of the Western Region
- In office 1 October 1954 – 1 October 1960
- Succeeded by: Faderera Aduke Akintola

Personal details
- Born: Hannah Idowu Dideolu Adelana; 25 November 1915 Ikenne, British Nigeria
- Died: 19 September 2015 (aged 99)
- Resting place: Ikenne, Ogun State, Nigeria
- Party: UPN (1978–1983)
- Other political affiliations: Action Group (1950–1966)
- Spouse: Obafemi Awolowo (m. 1937; died 1987)
- Children: 5
- Relatives: Dolapo Osinbajo (granddaughter); Yemi Osinbajo (grandson-in-law); Segun Awolowo Jr. (grandson)
- Education: Methodist Girls' High School
- Occupation: Businesswoman; politician

Chief Hannah Idowu Dideolu Awolowo ( née Adelana; 25 November 1915 – 19 September 2015), popularly known as HID, was a Nigerian businesswoman and politician.

== Biography ==
Awolowo was born to a modest family in the small community of Ikenne, Ogun State, Nigeria. She attended Methodist Girls' High School in Lagos. She was married to politician Obafemi Awolowo from 26 December 1937 until his death in 1987. He famously referred to her as his "jewel of inestimable value". She was also a successful businesswoman and astute politician. She played an active role in the politics of Western Nigeria. She stood in for her husband in the alliance formed between the NCNC and the AG, called the United Progressive Grand Alliance (UPGA), while he was on trial and in jail.

The plan was for her to contest the elections, and if she won, she would step down for her husband in a by-election. To fulfil his dream of becoming president in the Second Republic, she toured the length and breadth of the country with her husband campaigning. She also coordinated the women's wing of the party and was always present at all party caucuses. A successful businesswoman, she became the first Nigerian distributor for the Nigerian Tobacco Company (NTC) in 1957. She was also the first to import lace materials and other textiles into Nigeria.

In addition to various other titles, she held the chieftaincy of the Yeye Oodua of Yorubaland. On 19 September 2015, she died at the age of 99, just over two months short of her 100th birthday. She was buried beside her husband in Ikenne on 25 November 2015. The former Vice President of Nigeria, Yemi Osinbajo, is married to her granddaughter, Dolapo Soyode.
