= Obafemi Awolowo =

Nigerian politician (1909–1987)

Chief Obafemi Awolowo GCFR
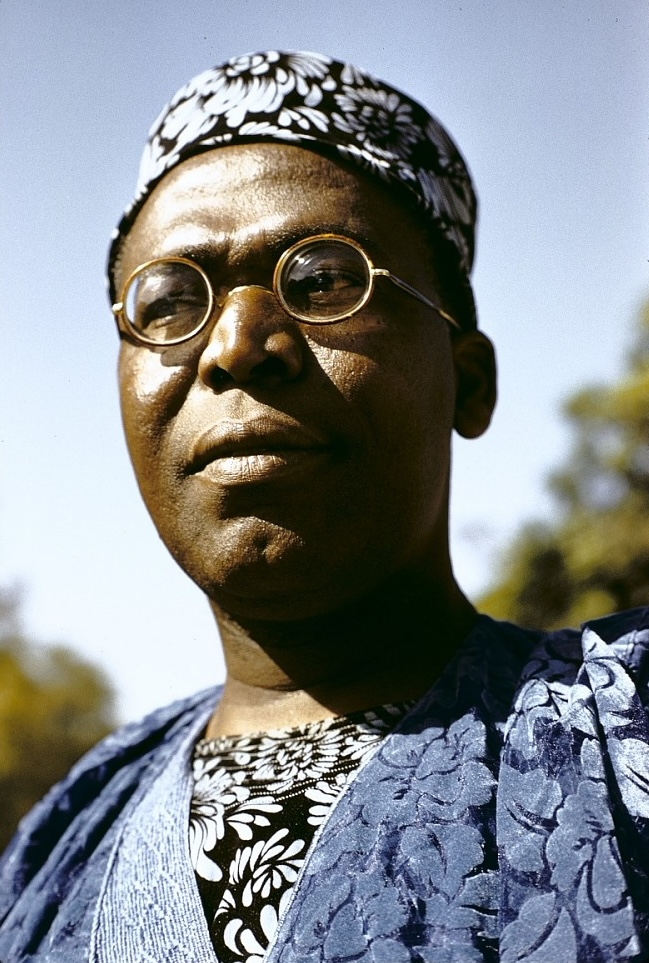
- Awolowo in 1959

Premier of Western Nigeria
- In office 1 October 1954 – 1 October 1960
- Monarch: Queen Elizabeth II
- Succeeded by: Samuel Akintola

Leader of the Opposition
- In office 12 December 1959 – November 1962
- Prime Minister: Abubakar Tafawa Balewa
- Deputy: Anthony Enahoro

Federal Commissioner for Finance
- In office 1967–1971
- President: Yakubu Gowon
- Preceded by: Festus Okotie-Eboh
- Succeeded by: Shehu Shagari

Leader of the Action Group
- In office 12 December 1959 – 15 January 1966

Personal details
- Born: Jeremiah Obafemi Oyeniyi Awolowo; 6 March 1909 Ikenne, Southern Nigeria Protectorate (now in Ogun State, Nigeria)
- Died: 9 May 1987 (aged 78) Ikenne, Ogun State, Nigeria
- Party: Unity Party of Nigeria (1978–1983); Action Group (1950–1966)
- Spouse: Hannah Adelana (m. 1937)
- Relations: Yemi Osinbajo (grandson-in-law); Dolapo Osinbajo (granddaughter); Segun Awolowo Jr. (grandson)
- Children: 5
- Education: University of London
- Profession: Journalist, lawyer

Chief Obafemi Jeremiah Oyeniyi Awolowo GCFR (6 March 1909 – 9 May 1987) was a Nigerian politician and statesman who served as the first Premier of the Western region of Nigeria. He was known as one of the key figures towards Nigeria's independence movement from 1957 to 1960. Awolowo founded the Yoruba nationalist group Egbe Omo Oduduwa as well as the Premier of the Western Region under Nigeria's parliamentary system from 1952 to 1959. He was the official opposition leader in the federal parliament to the Balewa government from 1959 to 1963.

As a young man he was an active journalist, editing publications such as the Nigerian Worker and the African Sentinel, on top of others as well. He later became founder and publisher of Nigerian Tribune of African Newspapers of Nigeria Ltd. He also expressed support for Nigerian nationalism and independence in his newspaper. After receiving his bachelor of commerce degree in Nigeria, he traveled to London to pursue his degree in law at the University Of London. Obafemi Awolowo was the first premier of the Western Region and later federal commissioner for finance, and vice chairman of the Federal Executive Council during the Nigerian Civil War. He was thrice a major contender for the country's highest office.

A native of Ikenne in Ogun State of south-western Nigeria, Awolowo started his career, like some of his well-known contemporaries, as a nationalist in the Nigerian Youth Movement in which he rose to become Western Provincial Secretary. Awolowo was responsible for much of the progressive social legislation that has made Nigeria a modern nation. In 1963, he was tried and jailed for 10 years on charges of sedition. He was pardoned by the government in 1966, after which he was appointed the Minister of Finance. In recognition of all of this, Awolowo was the first individual in the modern era to be named as the leader of the Yorubas (Yoruba: Asíwájú Àwọn Yorùbá or Asíwájú Ọmọ Oòduà).

== Early life ==
Awolowo was born Jeremiah Obafemi Oyeniyi Awolowo on 6 March 1909 in the Remo town of Ikenne (present-day Ogun State of Nigeria). He was the only son of David Shopolu Awolowo, a farmer and sawyer, and Mary Efunyela Awolowo. He had two sisters and one maternal half-sister. Awolowo's father was born to a high chief and member of the Iwarefa, the leading faction of the traditional Osugbo group that ruled Ikenne.

In 1896, Awolowo's father became one of the first Ikenne natives to convert to Christianity. Awolowo's paternal grandmother, Adefule Awolowo, whom Awolowo adored, was a devout worshipper of the Ifá. Adefule, Awolowo's grandmother, believed that Obafemi was a reincarnation of her father (his great-grandfather). Awolowo's father's conversion to Christianity often went at odds with his family's beliefs. He often challenged worshippers of the god of smallpox, Obaluaye. His father ultimately died on 8 April 1920, of smallpox when Obafemi was about eleven years old.

He attended various schools, including Baptist Boys' High School (BBHS), Abeokuta; and then became a teacher in Abeokuta, after which he qualified as a shorthand typist. Subsequently, he served as a clerk at the Wesley College Ibadan, as well as a correspondent for the Nigerian Times.

Following his education at Wesley College, Ibadan, in 1927, he enrolled at the University of London as an External Student and graduated with the degree of Bachelor of Commerce (Hons.). He went to the UK in 1944 to study law at the University of London and was called to the Bar by the Honorable Society of the Inner Temple on 19 November 1946. In 1949, Awolowo founded the Nigerian Tribune, a private Nigerian newspaper, which he used to spread nationalist consciousness among Nigerians.

== Politics ==
In 1945, he attended the fifth Pan-African Congress in Manchester as a representative of the Nigerian Youth Movement along with H. O. Davies. Also attending was an illustrious list of participants which included Kwame Nkrumah, Hastings Banda, Jomo Kenyatta and Jaja Wachuku, among others.

=== As premier ===
Awolowo was Nigeria's foremost federalist. In his Path to Nigerian Freedom (1947), the first systematic federalist manifesto by a Nigerian politician, he advocated federalism as the only basis for equitable national integration and, as head of the Action Group, he led demands for a federal constitution, which was introduced in the 1954 Lyttleton Constitution, following primarily the model proposed by the Western Region delegation led by him. He was also a keen advocate of minority rights and the relocation of the Federal Capital away from Lagos, advocating for Lagos rights to be governed by the Western region of largely Yoruba stock. He really took the country serious and wanted the yoruba's right to be known.

As premier, he proved to be and was viewed as a man of vision and a dynamic administrator. Awolowo was also the country's leading social democratic politician. He supported limited public ownership and limited central planning in government. He believed that the state should channel Nigeria's resources into education and state-led infrastructural development. Controversially, and at considerable expense, he introduced free primary education for all and free health care for children in the Western Region, established the first television service in Africa in 1959, and the Oduduwa Group, all of which were financed from the highly lucrative cocoa industry which was the mainstay of the regional economy.

His Valedictory Speech on 3 November 1959 to the Western Region House of Assembly recounting his achievements in office between 1952 and 1959, provides context to his work ethic and achievements as an administrator.

=== In opposition ===
From the eve of independence, he led the Action Group as the Leader of the Opposition in the federal parliament, leaving Samuel Ladoke Akintola as the Western Region Premier. Disagreements between Awolowo and Akintola on how to run the Western region led the latter to an alliance with the Tafawa Balewa-led NPC federal government. A constitutional crisis led to the declaration of a state of emergency in the Western Region, eventually resulting in a widespread breakdown of law and order.

Excluded from national government, Awolowo and his party faced an increasingly precarious position. Akintola's followers, angered at their exclusion from power, formed the Nigerian National Democratic Party (NNDP) under Akintola's leadership. Having previously suspended the elected Western Regional Assembly, the federal government then reconstituted the body after manoeuvres that brought Akintola's NNDP into power without an election. Shortly afterwards Awolowo and several disciples were arrested, charged, convicted (of treason), and jailed under Balewa for conspiring with the Ghanaian authorities to overthrow the federal government.

=== As national leader ===
By 1966, he was released and pardoned by the government, after which he assumed the position of Minister of Finance. From this position, he helped negotiate the joint venture rights of Nigeria in its new oil find, ushering in a decade of oil boom and providing the bulwark of national wealth. He also helped developed the system of national revenue sharing and fiscal allocation (FAAC), which enabled newly created states that boosted minority rights to thrive and survive to this day. He is also credited with naming the new national currency, the NIGERIAN NAIRA introduced under his leadership.

Regarding the blockade of Biafra during which more than 1 million Igbo children died of starvation, Awolowo was quoted as saying, "All is fair in war, and starvation is one of the weapons of war. I don't see why we should feed our enemies fat, only to fight us harder."

=== As presidential candidate ===
In 1979 and 1983, he contested under the Unity Party's platform as a presidential candidate, but lost to the northern-based National Party of Shehu Shagari. In 1979, he contested his loss in court, making a case for electoral college decision because the winning candidate could not have said to have won having not fulfilled the majority in 2/3 of states (then 19) which led to the landmark Supreme Court decision of 1979 with Chief Justice Fatai Williams presiding.

== Legacy ==
In 1992, the Obafemi Awolowo Foundation was founded as an independent, non-profit, non-partisan organisation committed to furthering the symbiotic interaction of public policy and relevant scholarship with a view to promoting the overall development of the Nigerian nation. The Foundation was launched by the President of Nigeria at that time, General Ibrahim Babangida, at the Liberty Stadium, Ibadan. The Obafemi Awolowo Foundation continues to promote his ideals through annual events like the 2025 Awolowo Memorial Webinar, themed _"Our 21st Century World: Reflections and Projections." Topics included technology (especially AI), economic self-reliance, and social justice — values Awolowo championed. However, his most important bequests (styled Awoism) are his exemplary integrity, his welfarism, his contributions to hastening the process of decolonisation and his consistent and reasoned advocacy of federalism-based on ethno-linguistic self-determination and uniting politically strong states-as the best basis for Nigerian unity. Awolowo died peacefully at his Ikenne home in Ogun State, the Efunyela Hall (so named after his mother), on 9 May 1987, at the age of 78 and was laid to rest in Ikenne, Ogun State, amid tributes across political and ethno-religious divides.

== Personal life ==
Awolowo married Hannah Idowu Dideolu Adelana, also from Ikenne Ogun State, on 26 December 1937. They had five (5) children, Olusegun Awolowo (1938-1963), (father of Segun Awolowo), Omotola Oyediran (née Awolowo) (1940-2020), Oluwole Awolowo (1942-2013), Ayodele Soyode (née Awolowo) (1944-2011), mother of former Second Lady of Nigeria Dolapo Osinbajo, and Tokunbo Awolowo-Dosunmu (1948).

== Honours ==
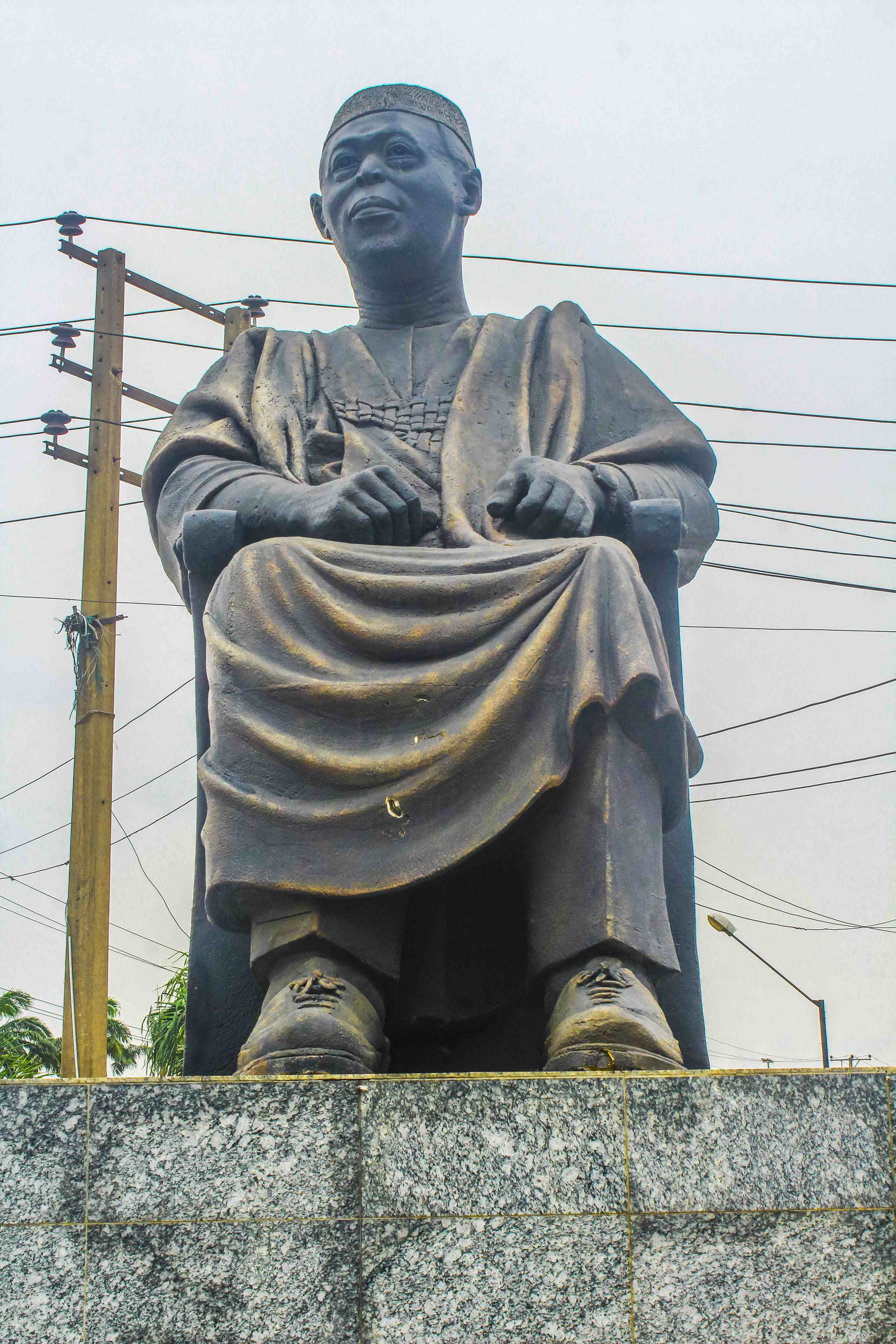
Statue of Awolowo in Ikeja

He is featured in the 100 Naira banknote since 1999.

In addition to a variety of other chieftaincy titles, his name has been featured on roads, such as Awolowo way, Bodija Ibadan, Chief Awolowo held the title of the Odole Oodua of Ile-Ife.

== Bibliography ==
- Path to Nigerian Freedom
- Awo – Autobiography of Chief Obafemi Awolowo
- My Early Life
- Thoughts on the Nigerian Constitution
- The People's Republic
- The Strategy & Tactics of the People's Republic of Nigeria
- The Problems of Africa – The Need for Ideological Appraisal
- Awo on the Nigerian Civil War
- Path to Nigerian Greatness
- Voice of Reason
- Voice of Courage
- Voice of Wisdom
- Adventures in Power – Book 1 – My March Through Prison
- Adventures in Power – Book 2 – Travails of Democracy
- My march through prison
- Socialism in the service of New Nigeria
- Selected speeches of Chief Obafemi Awolowo
- Philosophy of Independent Nigeria
- Memorable Quotes from Awo
- The Path to Economic Freedom in Developing Country
- Blueprint for Post-War Reconstruction
- Anglo-Nigerian Military Pact Agreement

== See also ==
Ikenne Residence of Chief Obafemi Awolowo
