= Nigerian Export Promotion Council =

Nigerian foreign trade agency

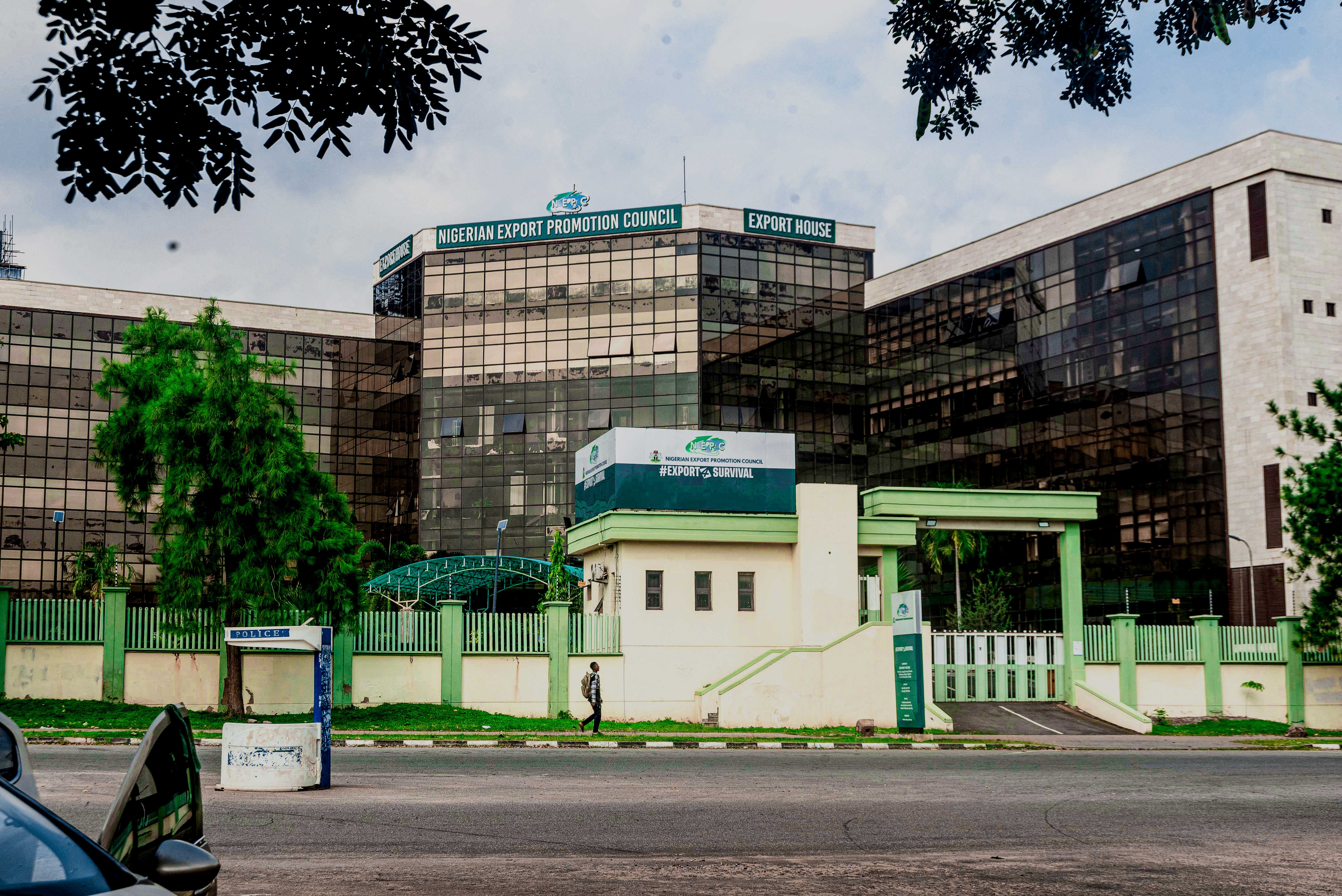
Headquarters in Abuja

The Nigerian Export Promotion Council (NEPC) was established through the promulgation of the “Nigerian Export Promotion Council Decree No. 26 of 1976”, now an Act in line with the democratic governance of the Country.

This Act was amended by Decree No. 72 of 1979 and further amended by the Nigerian Export Promotion Decree No. 41 of 1988 and complemented by the Export (Incentives and Miscellaneous Provisions) Decree No. 18 of 1986.

Furthermore, the Nigerian Export Promotion Council (Amendment) Decree No. 64 and 65 of 1992 was promulgated to enhance the performance of the Council.

The Council is the leading Federal Government Agency charged with the responsibility of promoting non-oil export in Nigeria to diversify away from oil and build a formidable economy. The headquarters of the Council is located at Export House, Plot 424 Aguiyi Ironsi Street, Maitama, Abuja.

== History ==
The Nigerian Export Promotion Council] (NEPC) was established through the promulgation of the Nigerian Export Promotion Council Decree No. 26 of 1976 and was formally implemented in March 1977. The act was amended by Decree No. 72 of 1979 and further amended by the Nigerian Export Promotion Council Decree No. 41 of 1988. Appended to the law was the Export (Incentives and Miscellaneous Provisions) Decree No. 18 of 1986, as well as the Nigerian Export Promotion Council Amendment Decree No. 64 of 1992.

The last was authored to enhance the performance of the council by minimizing bureaucratic bottlenecks and increasing autonomy in dealing with members of the organized private sector. The Council has a governing board drawn from both the public and private sectors.

== Mission and functions ==
To spearhead the diversification of the Nigerian economy by expanding and increasing non-oil exports for sustainable and inclusive economic growth.

- To promote the development and diversification of Nigeria's export trade.
- To assist in promoting the development of export-related industries in Nigeria.
- To spearhead the creation of appropriate export incentives and
- To actively articulate and promote the implementation of export policies and programs of the Nigerian Government.
- To co-coordinated monitor export promotion activities in Nigeria.
- To collect and disseminate information on products available for export.
- To collect and disseminate to local manufacturers and exporters information on foreign markets.
- To Provide technical assistance to local exporters in such areas as export procedures and documentation, transportation, financing, marketing techniques, quality control, export packaging, costing and pricing, publicity, and other similar areas.
- To maintain adequate and effective representation in other countries.
- To provide, directly or jointly, with training institutions, training for its staff and assist with the manpower development of the export community in Nigeria.
- To organize and plan the participation of Nigeria in trade fairs and exhibitions.
- To administer grants and other benefits related to export promotion and development.
- To undertake studies of the current economic conditions, with special attention to the export sector to advise the government on necessary policies and measures.
- To establish specific trade promotion facilities in Nigeria and other countries including the establishment of permanent showrooms at important commercial centers in other countries.
- To engage in export promotion publicity
- To pursue the simplification and streamlining of export procedures and documentation on continuously
- To assist in finding appropriate solutions to practical problems encountered by exporters in the process of exportation.
- To plan and organize outward trade missions and provide support from Nigeria.
- To perform such other functions as may be conducive to the achievement of the objective of the Export Decrees.

== Structure ==
The administration of the council was structured in the following regard: The board, which consists of the chairman and ten members drawn from the public and legate sectors.

The council's management is headed by the executive director/CEO. The council has several departments which are headed by Directors. There are six regional offices (one in each geopolitical zone) headed by regional coordinators. Then there are state coordinating offices in all the other states headed by state coordinators.

The Departments are:

- Corporate Services Department
- Export Development and Incentives Department
- Product Development Department
- Trade Information Department
- Policy and Strategy Department
- State Offices Coordinating Department
- Market Access Department
- Office of the chief executive officer Department.

== Management ==
The executive director/CEO of The Nigerian Export Promotion Council (NEPC) was Mr. Segun Awolowo from 2013–2017

The executive director/CEO of The Nigerian Export Promotion Council (NEPC) is Dr. Ezra Yakusak 2021– 2023.

The executive director/CEO of The Nigerian Export Promotion Council (NEPC) is Mrs. Nonye Ayeni 2023 - date

== See also ==
- Economy of Nigeria
- LADOL - special economic zone
