= Segun Awolowo =

Nigerian lawyer (1963–2025)

Segun Awolowo LLB
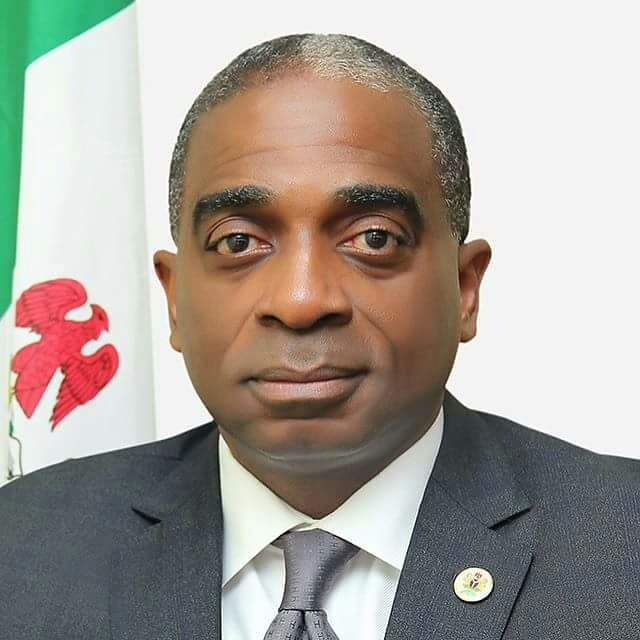

President of National Trade Promotion Organisation
- In office 2021 – 20 November 2025
- President: Jean-Claude Brou

Executive Director of the Nigerian Export Promotion Council
- In office February 2018 – November 2021
- President: Muhammadu Buhari
- In office November 2013 – November 2017
- President: Goodluck Jonathan; Muhammadu Buhari

Personal details
- Born: Olusegun Awolowo Jr. 27 September 1963
- Died: 20 November 2025 (aged 62)
- Education: Ogun State University; International School of Geneva
- Profession: Lawyer

Olusegun Awolowo Jr. (27 September 1963 – 20 November 2025) was a Nigerian lawyer. He was the executive director of Nigerian Export Promotion Council from 2013 to 2021. He was the grandson of Nigerian nationalist, socialist and statesman, Chief Obafemi Awolowo. In July 2021, he was unanimously elected as the President of National Trade Promotion Organizations (TPOs) from ECOWAS member States.

== Early life ==
Awolowo was born on 27 September 1963. His father (Segun Awolowo Sr.) died in 1963 at age 25 in a traffic collision on the old Ibadan-Lagos road. He was born two months after his father's death. He attended primary school in custody of his aunt and uncle, Tola and Kayode Oyediran. Before then, he had lived with his mother alongside his other siblings.

== Education ==
Awolowo started his education at the Maryhill Convent School alongside Dolapo Osinbajo, wife of Vice President Yemi Osinbajo, all in the custody of Prof and Mrs Oyediran. From there, he proceeded to Igbobi College, Yaba, Lagos State for his secondary school education and completed his secondary school education at Government College, Ibadan. On completion of his secondary school education, he proceeded to the Ogun State University (now Olabisi Onabanjo University), Ago Iwoye and graduated with an LLB degree.

== Career ==
Awolowo worked with the law firm of Abayomi Sogbesan & Co. and also with the law firm of GOK Ajayi & Co. after his call to the bar in December 1989. He served in President Olusegun Obasanjo's administration as a Special Assistant on Traditional Institutions, Legal Due Diligence and Legal Matters.

He was appointed by President Umaru Musa Yar'Adua as Special Assistant and worked with the Federal Capital Territory Administration (FCTA), Abuja as Secretary for Social Development and Secretary of Transport from 2007 to 2011. After the election of a new government in 2011, he went back to his law practice until in November 2013 when President Goodluck Jonathan appointed him as Executive Director/CEO of the Nigerian Export Promotion Council.
In July 2021, he was unanimously elected as the President of National Trade Promotion Organizations (TPOs) from ECOWAS member States.

=== NEPC ===
Awolowo was appointed the executive director of the Nigerian Export Promotion Council (NEPC) by President Goodluck Jonathan in 2013 and his tenure expired in November 2017 but he was reappointed executive director and chief executive officer by President Muhammadu Buhari in February 2018 for another four-year tenure.
In June 2019, the NEPC under his leadership planned a partnership with retail company, Shoprite for the latter to export Nigerian products to other African countries and beyond.

=== Zero Oil ===
Awolowo drove the Zero Oil Plan, as an economic blueprint for Nigeria. It was launched in 2016. He engaged to promote the plan with the private sector, relevant government institutions and international development partners and businesses. Zero Oil is a part of the Economic Recovery and Growth Plan (ERGP), a medium-term plan developed by the Federal Ministry of Budget and National Planning. His Zero Oil plan is to increase the country's export by increasing production of homemade goods, moving from the export of raw materials to value-added products so as to increase the foreign-exchange revenue, to promote the value of Nigerian-made products and services abroad, and to create jobs. It aims to generating $30 billion in foreign-exchange earnings.

=== MOU between AFREXIM, NEPC and NEXIM ===
In 2018, leading NEPC, he signed a Memorandum of understanding (MOU) worth $1 billion with AFREXIM Bank and Nigerian Export-Import Bank (NEXIM) at the maiden edition of Intra-African Trade Fair (IATF2018) in Cairo, Egypt, which aimed at promoting trade among African countries.

== Personal life and death ==
Awolowo was married to Bola Awolowo and they had three children.

Awolowo died on 20 November 2025, at the age of 62.
