= Lawal Pedro =

Nigerian lawyer

Attorney General and Commissioner for Justice of Lagos State
- Incumbent
- Assumed office 13 September 2023
- Governor: Babajide Sanwo-Olu
- Preceded by: Moyosore Onigbanjo SAN

Personal details
- Born: 6 October 1961 (age 65) Lagos Island, Lagos, Nigeria
- Education: Ahmadu Bello University (LLB)
- Occupation: Lawyer

Lawal Mohammed Alade Pedro SAN (born 6 October 1961) is a Nigerian lawyer and Senior Advocate of Nigeria (SAN). He has served as the Attorney general and Commissioner for Justice of Lagos State since 2023.

== Early life and education ==
Lawal Mohammed Alade Pedro was born on 6 October 1961, in Lagos Island, Lagos, Nigeria. He is a member of the Libento Pedro and Ojutikuamose branch of the Akinsemoyin Royal Family. Pedro attended Christ Church Cathedral Primary School, Broad Street, Lagos; Ahamadiyya College, Agege (now Anwar-ul-Islam Model College, Agege, Lagos); and Methodist Boys High School, Lagos. He earned his Bachelor of Laws (LLB) from Ahmadu Bello University, Zaria, and was called to the Nigerian Bar in 1986.

== Career ==
Pedro began his legal career with a mandatory youth service (NYSC) as a Legal Officer at the Western Regional Office of First Bank of Nigeria Plc in Ibadan. He joined the Lagos State Ministry of Justice in December 1987, working in various directorates and eventually becoming Director of Civil Litigation. In April 2008, he was appointed Solicitor General and Permanent Secretary of the Lagos State Ministry of Justice. That same year, he was conferred with the rank of Senior Advocate of Nigeria (SAN), becoming the first State Counsel in Lagos State and any other state public or civil service in Nigeria to receive this honor.

After retiring from public service in August 2015, Pedro began private legal practice with the firm Lawal Pedro SAN & Associates, which has offices in Lagos and Abuja. He is a member of the Nigerian Bar Association (NBA), the International Bar Association (IBA), and a Fellow of the Chartered Institute of Arbitrators Nigeria (FCIArb). He is also a CEDR Accredited Mediator and an author.

On 13 September 2023 he was appointed Attorney General and Commissioner for Justice of Lagos State by Governor Babajide Sanwo-Olu. This appointment marked him as the first individual to rise from the position of State Counsel to Commissioner within the same Ministry.
