= Attorney General of Lagos State =

Head of the Lagos State Ministry of Justice

- Incumbent; Lawal Pedro since 13 September 2023
- Style: Mr. Commissioner (Informal); The Honorable (Formal)
- Appointer: Lagos State Governor nomination with House of Assembly confirmation
- Term length: 4 years
- Formation: 1968; 58 years ago

The Attorney General of Lagos State also known as Lagos State Commissioner for Justice is the head of the Lagos State Ministry of Justice. The officer's duty is to ensure that "the laws of the state are uniformly and adequately enforced". The Attorney General carries out the responsibilities of the office through the Ministry of Justice. The Attorney General is appointed to a four-years term, with a maximum of two terms, by the Governor subject to the approval of the State House of Assembly. The incumbent Attorney General is Lawal Pedro appointed on 13 September 2023.

== Statutory duties ==
By Section 195 of the 1999 Constitution of Nigeria, “There shall be an Attorney-General for each State who shall be the Chief Law Officer of the State and a Commissioner for Justice of the government of that State pursuant to the above provision”. Also the Attorney General shall be the Head the Ministry of Justice, charged with the responsibility to provide a legal services and support for local law enforcement in the state and acts as the chief counsel in state litigation. In addition, the Attorney General Oversees law enforcement agencies.

== History ==
The office was established in 1968, just a year after Lagos State was founded. Since the establishment of the office, sixteen officials had served in that capacity including Professor Yemi Osinbajo, a former vice president of the Federal Republic of Nigeria.

== List of attorneys general ==
Source: Lagos State Ministry of Justice

| Chief Justice | Term |
|---|---|
| Chief Adeniran Ogunsanya | 1968–1973 |
| Tajudeen Bankole-Oki, SAN | 1973–1975 |
| Prof. Alfred Bandele Kasunmu, SAN | 1975–1977 |
| Chief Femi Alokolaro | 1977–1979 |
| Jide Oki | 1979 |
| Sanu Sobowale | 1979–1982 |
| Chief Femi Alokolaro | 1982–1983 |
| Airat Balogun | 1984–1986 |
| Eniola Fadayomi | 1986–1990 |
| Shafiu Alade Bashua | 1990–1992 |
| Yomi Oshikoya | 1992–1994 |
| Toyin Akerele Ayeni | 1994–1996 |
| Muyibat Wonuola Folami | 1996–1999 |
| Prof. Yemi Osinbajo, SAN | 1999–2007 |
| Olasupo Shasore, SAN | 2007–2011 |
| Adeola Rahman Ipaye | 2011–2015 |
| Mosediq Adeniji Kazeem | 2015–2019 |
| Moyosore Onigbanjo, SAN | 2019 – 2023 |
| Lawal Pedro, SAN | September 13, 2023- present |
