= Dolapo Osinbajo =

Second Lady of Nigeria from 2015 to 2023

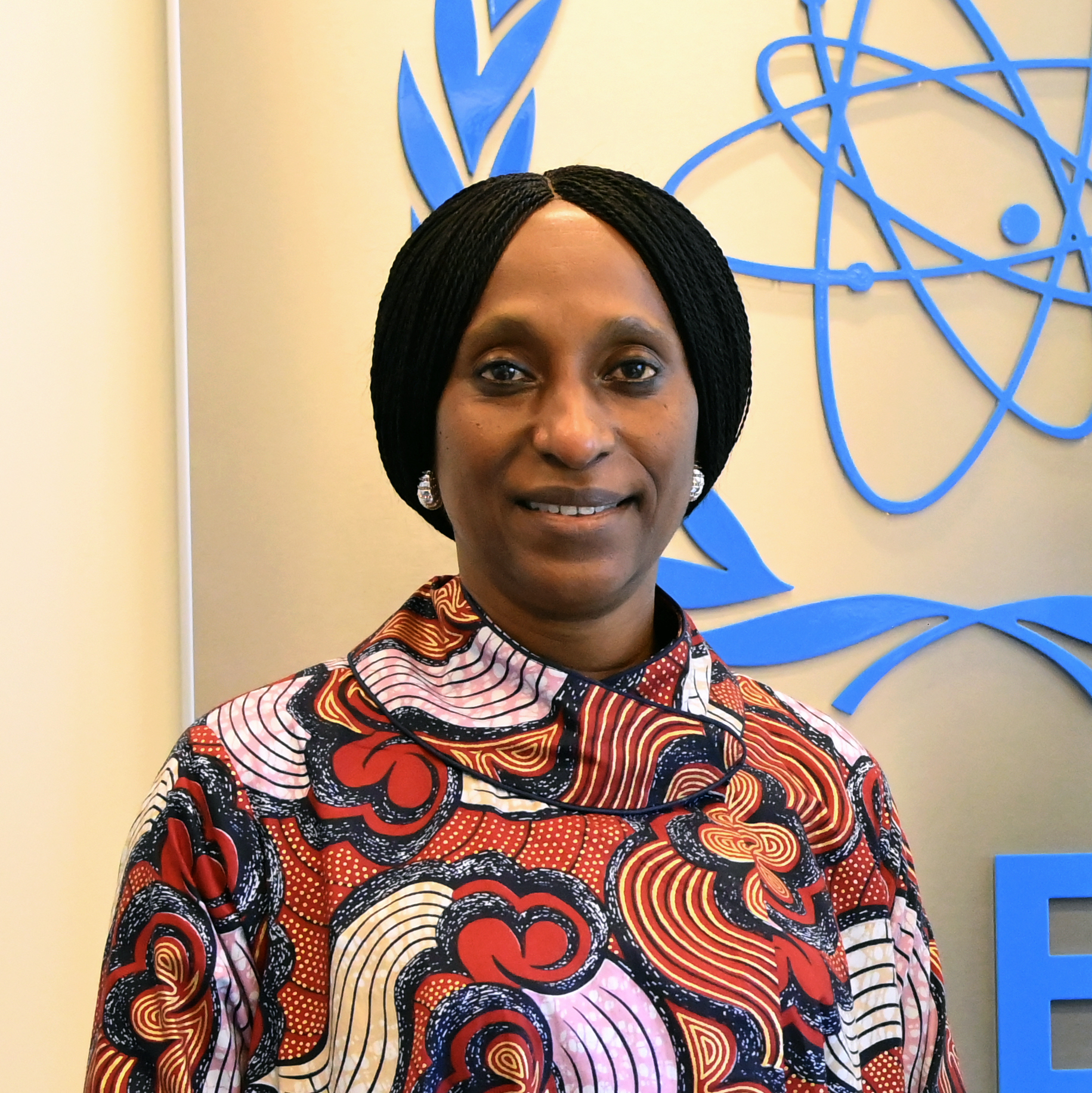

Second Lady of Nigeria
- In role 29 May 2015 – 29 May 2023
- Vice President: Yemi Osinbajo
- First Lady: Aisha Buhari
- Preceded by: Amina Sambo
- Succeeded by: Nana Shettima

Personal details
- Born: Oludolapo Soyode; 15 July 1967 (age 58) Ikenne, Western State, Nigeria (now in Ogun State)
- Party: All Progressives Congress
- Spouse: Yemi Osinbajo (m. 1989)
- Relations: Obafemi Awolowo (grandfather); Hannah Awolowo (grandmother); Segun Awolowo (cousin)
- Children: 3
- Occupation: Politician; lawyer

Oludolapo Osinbajo (née Soyode; born 15 July 1967) is a Nigerian lawyer who served as the second lady of Nigeria from 2015 to 2023, as the wife of Vice President Yemi Osinbajo.

== Early life and career ==
Oludolapo Soyode was born on 15 July 1967 and grew up in Ikenne, Ogun State. She attended the International School Ibadan. She is a grand-daughter of Obafemi Awolowo, who was a Nigerian nationalist and Yoruba chief, and his wife Hannah Awolowo, through Awolowo's daughter Ayodele Soyode (née Awolowo).

She married Yemi Osinbajo, a distant cousin, on 25 November 1989. In 1990, she was called to the Nigerian Bar.

Osinbajo is the executive director of The Women's Helping Hand Initiative, a refuge facility in Epe, Lagos, established in 2006, and a co-founder of the Orderly Society Trust.

== Activities as Second Lady ==
In September 2019, she presided at the 49th Benue Women in Prayer (BEWIP) Prayer Convocation in Makurdi. She also inaugurated Mama Abyol Children's Home and Benue Centre for Enterprise Development and Innovation (BENCEDI). In her speech to young people in Benue State, she warned them against attempting to copy illusory internet lifestyles. Speaking to out-of-school graduating girls in Lagos in December 2019, she encouraged them to live responsibly as good role models. She also characterised violence against women as an offence against humanity. In mid-December 2019, Nigeria's First Lady, Aisha Buhari, appointed Osinbajo – together with the wives of Nigerian state governors – as a 'champion' to lead the fight against tuberculosis in Nigeria.

In 2022, she made an official visit to the IAEA in Vienna.

== Works ==
- They Call Me Mama: From the Under Bridge Diaries. 2014.
