= Yemi Osinbajo =

Vice President of Nigeria from 2015 to 2023

His Excellency Professor Yemi Osinbajo SAN GCON
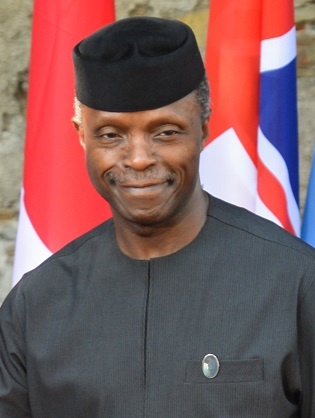
- Osinbajo in 2017

14th Vice President of Nigeria
- In office 29 May 2015 – 29 May 2023
- President: Muhammadu Buhari
- Preceded by: Namadi Sambo
- Succeeded by: Kashim Shettima

Acting President of Nigeria
- In office 7 May 2017 – 19 August 2017
- Preceded by: Muhammadu Buhari
- Succeeded by: Muhammadu Buhari
- In office 19 January 2017 – 13 March 2017
- Preceded by: Muhammadu Buhari
- Succeeded by: Muhammadu Buhari
- In office 6 June 2016 – 19 June 2016
- Preceded by: Muhammadu Buhari
- Succeeded by: Muhammadu Buhari

Attorney General of Lagos State
- In office 29 May 1999 – 29 May 2007
- Governor: Bola Tinubu
- Preceded by: Muyibat Folami
- Succeeded by: Olasupo Shasore

Personal details
- Born: Oluyemi Oluleke Osinbajo; 8 March 1957 (age 69) Lagos, British Nigeria (now Lagos, Lagos State, Nigeria)
- Party: All Progressives Congress
- Spouse: Oludolapo Soyode (m. 1989)
- Children: 3
- Relatives: Obafemi Awolowo (grandfather-in-law); Hannah Awolowo (grandmother-in-law); Kemi Badenoch (first cousin once-removed)
- Education: University of Lagos (LLB); Nigerian Law School; London School of Economics (LLM)
- Occupation: Politician; lawyer; professor; pastor
- Awards: List of honors and awards
- Website: yemiosinbajo.ng

Oluyemi Oluleke Osinbajo SAN GCON (born 8 March 1957) is a Nigerian pastor, lawyer, professor, and politician who served as the 14th vice president of Nigeria from 2015 to 2023. A member of the All Progressives Congress (APC), he previously served as Attorney General of Lagos State from 1999 to 2007 and holds the title of Senior Advocate of Nigeria.

Born in Lagos in 1957, Osinbajo is a graduate of the University of Lagos and London School of Economics. Shortly thereafter, he started teaching at the University of Lagos while practicing law privately until 1999. That year, Osinbajo was appointed Attorney-General and Commissioner for Justice in the cabinet of Lagos State Governor Bola Tinubu. After serving during both of Tinubu's four-year terms, Osinbajo left government in 2007 and returned to his private practice and lecturing along with his divine call of being a Pastor at the Redeemed Christian Church of God.

Prior to the 2015 presidential election, Osinbajo was chosen as the running mate to APC nominee Muhammadu Buhari. Their ticket went on to defeat the then-incumbent duo of President Goodluck Jonathan and Vice President Namadi Sambo. Four years later, the ticket was re-elected over the Peoples Democratic Party's Atiku Abubakar and Peter Obi. Osinbajo's tenure was marked by his rising profile, especially when he took power as acting president while Buhari was on a medical vacation in the United Kingdom. Actions taken during his brief stints as the leader of the nation were decisive but contrasted with Buhari's style and were controversial among Buhari's inner circle, who frowned at it, one major decision was when in an executive order he directed all International Oil Companies operating in the Niger-Delta region to relocate their headquarters to their states of operation to mitigate tension in host communities.

== Education ==
Osinbajo was educated at Corona primary School, in Lagos. He attended Igbobi College in Yaba, Lagos, from 1969 to 1975, where he won the following awards: the State Merit Award (1971); the School Prize for English Oratory (1972); Adeoba Prize for English Oratory (1972–1975); Elias Prize for Best Performance in History (WASC, 1973); School Prize for Literature (HSC, 1975); and African Statesman Intercollegiate Best Speaker's Prize (1974).

Thereafter he studied for his undergraduate degree at the University of Lagos between 1975 and 1978, when he obtained a Second Class Honours (Upper Division) Degree in Law. Here, he also won the Graham-Douglas Prize for Commercial Law. In 1979, he completed the mandatory one-year professional training at the Nigerian Law School whereon he was admitted to practice as a Barrister and Solicitor of the Supreme Court of Nigeria. In 1980, he attended the London School of Economics, where he obtained a Master of Laws degree.

== Early career ==
From 1979 to 1980, Osinbajo served the compulsory one-year youth service as a legal officer with Bendel Development and Planning Authority (BDPA), Bendel State.

In 1981, at 24, he was employed as a law lecturer at the University of Lagos, Nigeria. From 1983 to 1986, he became a Senior Lecturer of Law at the University of Lagos. From 1988 to 1992, he was appointed the Senior Special Adviser (Soliciting and Litigation) to Nigeria's Honourable Attorney-General and Minister of Justice, Bola Ajibola.

In 1997, Osinbajo became a professor of the law of evidence and was head of the Department of Public Law, University of Lagos from 1997 to 1999 until his appointment as Commissioner for Justice.

From 1999 to 2007, Osinbajo, served in the Lagos State Cabinet of Bola Tinubu as the Honourable Attorney-General and Commissioner for Justice.

In 2007, Osinbajo was made Senior Partner at Simmons Cooper Partners (Barristers and Solicitors), Nigeria.

His other past roles include:

- Senior Officer, United Nations Operations in Somalia, Justice Division, UNOSOM II.
- Member, United Nations Secretary General's Committee of Experts on Conduct and Discipline of UN, Peacekeeping Personnel around the globe, Member, 2006.
- Senior Partner in the law firm of Osinbajo, Kukoyi & Adokpaye.

== All Progressives Congress (APC) ==
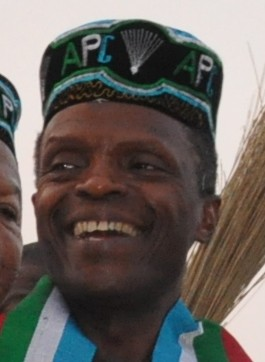
Osinbajo during the 2015 general election campaign

After the formation of the All Progressives Congress (APC) in 2013, Yemi was tasked with other notable Nigerians to design and produce a manifesto for the new political party. This culminated in the presentation of the "Roadmap to a New Nigeria", a document published by APC as its manifesto if elected to power. The highlights of the Roadmap included a free schools meal plan, a conditional cash transfer to the 25 million poorest Nigerians if they enroll children in school and immunize them. There were also a number of programs designed to create economic opportunities for Nigeria's massive youth population.

On 17 December 2014 the presidential candidate of the All Progressives Congress, retired General Muhammadu Buhari, announced Osinbajo as his running mate and vice-presidential candidate for the 2015 general elections. During the 2014/2015 campaigns of the All progressives Congress, Yemi Osinbajo held numerous town hall meetings across the country as against the popular rallies that many Nigerians and their politicians were used to. One of his campaign promises, which he has recently reiterated, was the plan to feed a school child a meal per day. Beyond feeding the school children, he has recently emphasized that this plan will create jobs (another campaign promise) for those who will make it happen.

In April 2022, he announced his intention to run for the APC nomination for President of Nigeria in the 2023 presidential election. He was third in the APC presidential primaries held in June 2022, with a total of 235 votes from the delegates.

== Vice Presidency (2015–2023) ==
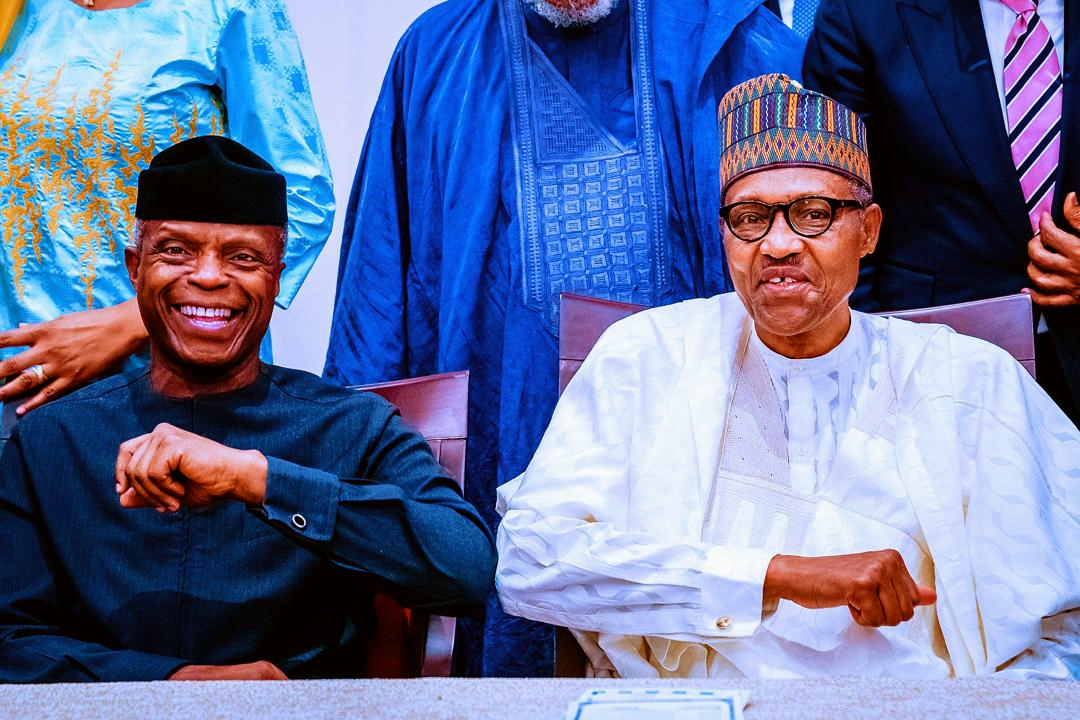
Vice President Osinbajo and President Buhari (2020)

On 31 March 2015, Muhammadu Buhari was confirmed by the Independent National Electoral Commission (INEC) as the winner of the presidential elections. Thus, Osinbajo became the Vice President-elect of Nigeria. They were both sworn in on 29 May 2015. On 17 August 2017 VP Yemi Osinbajo described hate speech as a species of terrorism.

=== First term (2015–2019) ===
Tenure

Seal of the vice-president.

Yemi Osinbajo assumed office after taking the oath of office on 29 May 2015 at the Eagle Square, Abuja. As the Vice President of the Federal Republic of Nigeria, he oversaw the economic planning team and report as well as make recommendations to the president who takes the final decision. Because of his legal background and antecedents as a commissioner for justice in Lagos state for eight years, many expect that he will contribute a great deal to the much needed reform of the judicial system at the national level.

Acting President

President Muhammadu Buhari wrote a written declaration on 9 May 2017 to the president of the senate and house of representatives on his decision to embark on a medical trip; the letter was read that day at a plenary assembly of both the senate and the house of representatives. The acting presidency was conferred upon Vice president Osinbajo during President Buhari's medical leave.

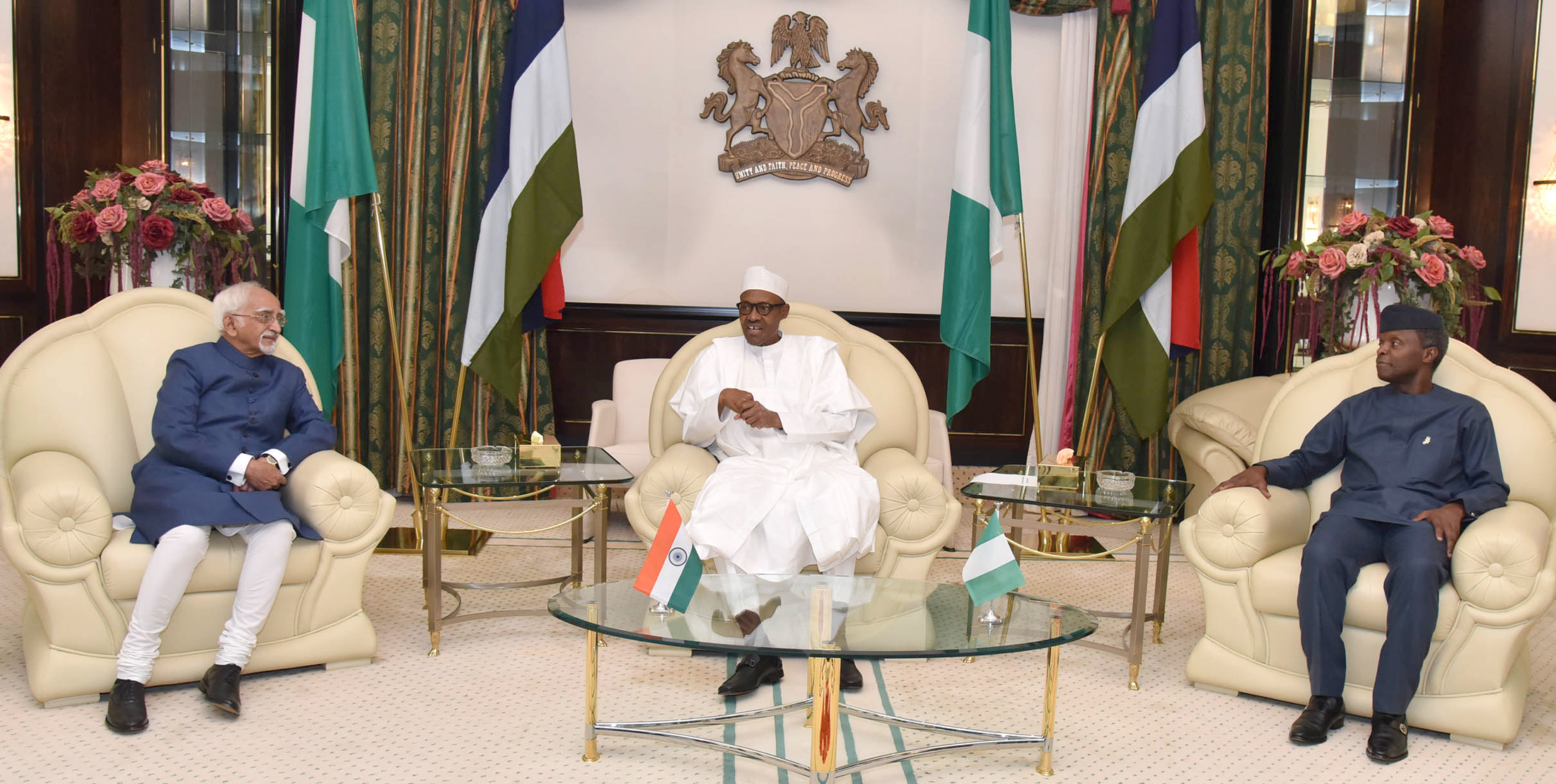
Indian Vice President Mohammad Hamid Ansari calling on the President of Nigeria Muhammadu Buhari at the State House, in Abuja, Nigeria, on 27 September 2016. Vice President Yemi Osinbajo is seen to the right.

On 7 August 2018, Osinbajo fired the State Security Service boss, Lawal Daura for illegal invasion of National Assembly by armed and masked operatives of the department. Daura was replaced with Matthew Seiyefa.

=== Second term (2019–2023) ===
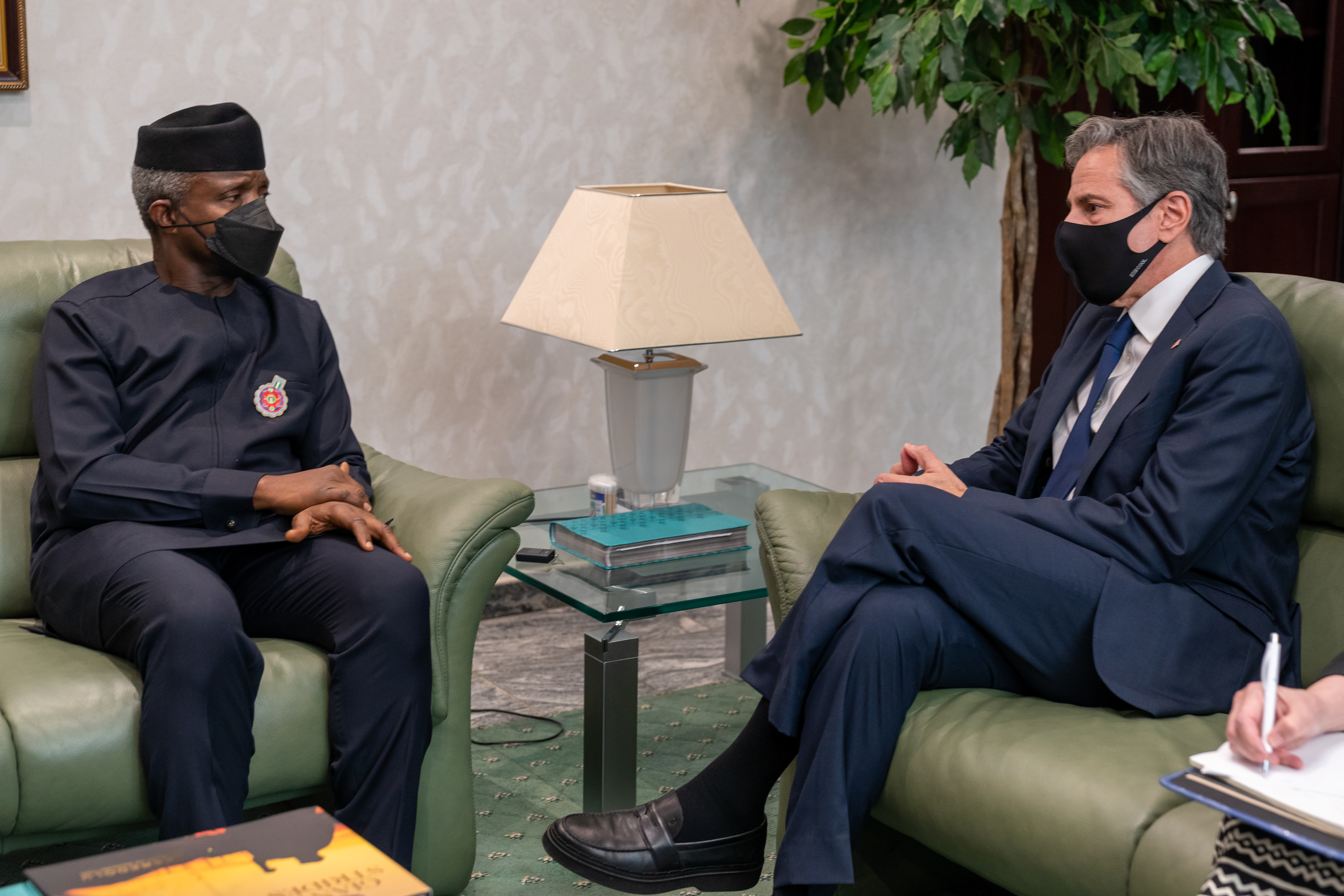
Osinbajo with US Secretary of State Antony Blinken in 2021

In January 2019, Osinbajo criticized the fact that social media is currently "under multi-jurisdictional regulation". He called for more collaboration among nations to reach a convention to regulate social media and counter hate speech.

On 2 February 2019, Osinbajo's helicopter crashed in Kabba, Kogi State. He survived, and delivered a previously scheduled campaign speech after the crash. In the speech, he said he was "extremely grateful to the Lord for preserving our lives from the incident that just happened. Everyone of us is safe and no one is maimed."

Tenure

On 29 May 2019, Osinbajo took his oath of office to begin his second term at Eagle Square in the capital of Abuja.

Following the federal government's decision to close the nation's land borders in October 2019, Osinbajo explained that the government did so to gain the attention of other nations to the importance of policing the borders. He claimed that China and other nations were smuggling in products, including agricultural ones, undermining the Nigerian economy and threatening Nigerian agriculture. By closing the borders, Osinbajo claimed that the government was helping protect the economy and Nigeria's producers and farmers.

In October 2019, Osinbajo criticized the government's proposed social media regulations, stating he did "not think that government regulation is necessarily the way to go". Instead, he asked citizens to take more active steps to police social media. He stated that citizens and leaders, both political and religious, "owe a responsibility to our society and to everyone else, to ensure that we don't allow it to become an instrument" of war. He also warned people against using social media to spread "religious disinformation", which could lead to conflict and war.

On 31 March 2020, President Muhammadu Buhari appointed Vice president Osinbajo to chair an economic sustainability committee. The aim of the committee is to develop measures to cushion the effect of the coronavirus and eventually reposition the Nigerian economy.

In July 2020, his spokesman stated that Osinbajo has become a "political target", stating "I'm his spokesperson and all I know he wants to do is to do this job that he has been given very well and he doesn't have any other plans right now about any such thing. I can tell you that clearly."

== Post Vice Presidency ==
On 25 May 2023, Before the expiration of Osinbajo's tenure in office as Vice President of Nigeria, he was named as the chair for the Commonwealth observation group for the Sierra Leone 2023 presidential elections. Osinbajo chaired this observation group with a team consisting of experts in politics, the legal profession and media. The Secretary General expressed gratitude for Osinbajo's acceptance to chair the group and noting that as a professor of law, he's one of the few leading legal experts from the Commonwealth African nations to undertake the task.

On 11 July 2023, Osinbajo was appointed Global Advisor for the Global Energy Alliance for People and Planet (GEAPP). The head of the organisation Simon Harford said that the appointment will help in the organisation's mission in the development of clean energy in developing countries. "For many years, His Excellency Professor Yemi Osinbajo has been a respected role model of public service at the forefront of policy formulation and implementation on crucial developmental issues relating to national planning, climate change, enabling the business and investment environment, governance, and social investment," Harford said.

Osinbajo also set up a personal NFPO, Future Perspectives, which aims at equipping young people with skills of innovation, policy and project implementation to support their role as changemakers, capable of developing and implementing their own initiatives, as well as other collective efforts to transform education now and for future generations. This initiative was supported by the UNESCO International Institute for Higher Education in Latin America and the Caribbean (IESALC).

== Controversy ==
=== SimmonsCooper and Ocean Trust payment ===
In July 2019, The Punch reported that SimmonsCooper Partners, a law firm co-founded by Yemi Osinbajo [ref] — who served as Senior Partner until 2015 when he became Vice President — was listed as the company secretary for Ocean Trust Limited in a Corporate Affairs Commission (CAC) filing. In response, the firm issued a press statement denying that it had ever been retained by Ocean Trust to provide secretarial, legal, or any other services. It further disputed ever using the listed address in the alleged filing, demanded an apology and threatened legal action unless the article was retracted in 72 hours. Punch subsequently responded that it had no intent to defame SimmonsCooper or misrepresent the firm’s role, asserting that the story was based on publicly available CAC documents. As of July 2025, the article remains online and SimmonsCooper has not taken legal action.

Shortly after the publication, the Economic and Financial Crimes Commission (EFCC) issued a statement confirming that it had received a petition relating to Alpha Beta but noted that the petitioner had not substantiated the allegations contained in the petition. The Commission criticised the Punch report as premature, stated that its investigation was ongoing, and expressed concern that its response was not included in the article prior to publication.

In February 2022, Peoples Gazette published a report citing bank documents that showed SimmonsCooper had received a single ₦25 million payment from Ocean Trust in April 2013. Ocean Trust had previously been linked in media reports to alleged financial structures associated with Bola Tinubu, Osinbajo's former political superior.

The article prompted discussion in some media outlets about the firm's earlier denial and its consistency with the newly revealed transaction. SimmonsCooper's 2019 statement had denied that they provided legal or secretarial services to Ocean Trust or participated in any alleged wrongdoing, but it did not directly address whether the firm had received funds from the company.

Legal ethics frameworks in both common law and Nigerian practice permit law firms to receive third-party payments on behalf of clients, provided the client consents and the arrangement does not involve a conflict of interest or illegality.

In its 2019 response, the firm emphasised that offering professional services to a company does not necessarily imply association with wrongdoing. Nigerian anti-money laundering regulations, such as the Money Laundering (Prohibition) Act and Special Control Unit Against Money Laundering (SCUML) guidelines, require law firms and other designated non-financial institutions to report suspicious transactions. However, such reporting is only mandated when a transaction appears suspicious or is linked to known risk entities. At the time of the transaction in 2013, there were no public reports describing Ocean Trust as a high-risk or shell entity. Media allegations about its use in suspected laundering emerged in public reporting following a 2018 EFCC petition.

As of 2025, no evidence, charges or official investigations related to the payment have been made public. SimmonsCooper has not issued any further clarification regarding the payment since the 2022 publication.

=== Electoral law violation ===
In another exclusive report by Peoples Gazette which cited bank records, Osinbajo received 200 million naira in the run-up to the 2015 presidential election from Guaranty Trust Holding Company PLC's Investment One, in three tranches of N100 million, N50 million and N50 million, in violation of federal campaign finance law – which only approves the donation limit of N1 million to a candidate in a presidential race. The managing partners at Osinbajo's firm SimmonsCooper also donated the sum of N50 million in two payments of N25 million. Other lawyers with a relationship with Osinbajo donated N10 million to the campaign bank account. All of this was in violation of the electoral law. Osinbajo did not disclose these violations to the electoral body or the police.

== Family ==
Yemi Osinbajo was born into the family of Opeoluwa Osinbajo on 8 March 1957, Creek Hospital, Lagos. Osinbajo is married to Dolapo (née Soyode) Osinbajo, a granddaughter of Obafemi Awolowo. The former vice-president and Second Lady have three children, one son-in-law, and one grandson born in September 2020: two daughters, Oluwadamilola and Olukonyinsola (popularly known as Kiki Osinbajo) then his son, Mofiyinfoluwa Osinbajo, son-in-law, Oluseun Bakare, who is married to Oluwadamilola.

Osinbajo's first cousin once removed is British politician and Conservative Party leader Kemi Badenoch.

== Awards and memberships ==
=== Awards ===
Yemi Osinbajo, has received several awards, they include:

- State Merit Award 1971
- The School Prize for English Oratory, 1972
- Adeoba Prize for English Oratory 1972–1975
- Elias Prize for Best Performance in History (WASC) 1973
- School Prize for Literature (HSC), 1975
- African Statesman Intercollegiate Best Speaker's Prize, 1974
- President Goodluck Jonathan conferred on Osinbajo the Grand Commander of the Order of the Niger on 28 May 2015.
- During a visit on 3 November 2019 to Daura, the Emir of Daura, Faruk Umar, called Osinbajo "the most trustworthy Vice President of Nigeria" and thanked him for his loyalty to President Buhari's administration. The Emir then gave him the title of Danmadami of Daura, the highest traditional title in the emirate.
- First National Nutrition Vanguard of the Federal Republic of Nigeria from the Nutrition Society of Nigeria, NSN in 2022

=== Memberships ===
He is a member of the following professional bodies:

- Nigerian Bar Association
- International Bar Association
- Nigerian Body of Benchers
- Council of Legal Education in Nigeria and Senior Advocate of Nigeria

== Fashion ==
"Osinbajo is said to be known for wearing his famous black traditional hat, in a 'very delicate and pristine way that stands out', and his cap has said to become so famous that the style is said to being now dubbed as the "Osinbajo cap" by fashion designers."

== Pastoral career ==
Osinbajo is a Senior Pastor of the Lagos Province 48 (Olive Tree provincial headquarters) of the Redeemed Christian Church of God.

== The 8th March Initiative ==
The initiative was conceptualized as a way to celebrate Osinbajo's birthday by a group that refers to themselves as 'Friends of Prof'. Its aim is stated as "inspiring and promoting entrepreneurial endeavours within Nigeria in honour of the Vice President Yemi Osinbajo". The initiative, in 2020, provided a number of start-ups and small businesses with one-off grants and planned to do the same in 2021. It plans to recognize health workers at the forefront of the fight against COVID-19 while providing nationwide medical intervention.

== Publications ==
Chapters contributed to books

- The Common Law, The Evidence Act and The Interpretation of Section 5(a) in Essays in Honour of Judge Elias (1986) (J.A. Omotola, ed) pgs. 165–18;
- Some Reforms in The Nigerian Law of Evidence Chapter in Law and Development (1986), (J.A. Omotola and A.A. Adeogun eds.) pgs. 282–311;
- Rules of Evidence in Criminal Trials in the Nigerian Special Military Tribunals Chapter 2 in Essays on Nigerian Law, Vol ... 1, Pgs. 28–42. (J.A. Omotola ed)
- Some Public Law Considerations in Environmental Protection. Chapter in "Environmental Laws in Nigeria", (J.A. Omotola ed.) 1990 pgs 128–149
- Domestic and International Protection for Women: "Landmarks on the Journey so far" in Women and Children under Nigerian Law". (Awa U. Kalu & Yemi Osinbajo eds.) 1990. pgs. 231–241
- Some Problems of Proof of Bank Frauds and Other Financial Malpractices in Bank Frauds and Other Financial Malpractices in Nigeria (Awa Kalu ed.)
- FMJL Review Series, Modalities For The Implementation of The Transition Provisions in The New Constitution in Law Development and Administration (Yemi Osinbajo & Awa Kalu eds.) (1990).
- FMJL Review Series, Legal and Institutional Framework For The Eradication of Drug Trafficking in Nigeria – Narcotics: Laws and Policy in Nigeria (Awa Kalu & Yemi Osinbajo eds.) 1990
- Proof of Customary Law in non-Customary Courts, – Towards a Restatement of Nigerian Customary Laws, (Osinbajo & Awa Kalu eds.) 1991
- External Debt Management: Case Study of Nigeria – International Finance and External Debt Management, UNDP/UNCTC, 1991
- Judicial and Quasi-judicial Processing of Economic and organised Crimes: Experiences, Problems etc. Essays in Honour of Judge Bola Ajibola, (Prof. C.O. Okonkwo ed.) 1992
- Human Rights, Economic Development and the Corruption Factor in Human Rights and the Rule of Law and Development in Africa (Paul T. Zeleza et al. eds) 2004

Articles published in law journals

- Legitimacy and Illegitimacy under Nigerian Law Nig. J. Contemp. Law. (1984–87) pgs. 30–45
- Unraveling Evidence of Spouses in Nigeria, Legal Practitioners Review Vol. 1 No. 2 1987 pgs. 23–28
- Can States Legislate on Rules of Evidence? Nigerian Current Law Review 1985 pgs. 234–242
- Problems of Proof in Declaration of Title to Land, Journal of Private and Property Law Vol. 6 & 7, October 1986, pgs. 47–68
- Interpretation of Section 131(a) of the Evidence Act. Journal of Private and Property Law Vol. 6 & 7 (1986), pgs. 118–122
- Review of Some Decrees of the Structural Adjustment Era (Part 1, 2, 3), (1989) 2 GRBPL No. 2 (Gravitas Review of Business and Property Law) pgs.60–63, (1989) 2 GRBPL No. 3 (Gravitas Review of Business and Property Law) pgs. 51–55, (1989) 2 GRBPL No. 4 (Gravitas Review of Business and Property Law)
- Current Issues in Transnational Lending and Debt Restructuring Agreements part 1 and 2, Autonomy, Academic Freedom and the Laws Establishing Universities in Nigeria (1990) Jus. Vol. 1 No. 2, pgs. 53–64, Admissibility of Computer Generated Evidence. (1990) Jus. Vol. 1 No. 1 pgs. 9–12
- Allegations of Crime in Civil Proceedings, U.I. Law Review 1987;
- Roles, Duties and Liabilities of Collateral Participants and Professional Advisers in Unit Trust Schemes (1991) Jus. Vol. 1 No. 7 pgs. 71–83, Reform of the Criminal Law of Evidence in Nigeria (1991) Jus. 2 No. 4 Pgs. 71–98
- Profit and Loss Sharing Banks – (1990) Jus. Vol. 2 No. 8, Juvenile Justice Administration in Nigeria.
- A review of the Beijing Rules. (1991) Jus. Vol. 2 No. 6. Pgs. 65–73
- Sovereign Immunity in International Commercial Arbitration – The Nigerian experience and emerging state practice- In African Journal of International and Comparative Law, 4 RADIC 1992, page 1-25, Human Rights and Economic Development in The International Lawyer. 1994, Vol. 28, No. 3 pgs. 727–742
- Legality in a Collapsed State: The Somalia Experience 45 ICLQ 1996, pgs. 910–924.

Books published/edited

- Nigerian Media Law, GRAVITAS Publishers 1991
- Cases and Materials on Nigerian Law of Evidence, Macmillan, 1996
- Integration of the African Continent Through Law" (Edward Foakes Publishers, 1989, vol. 7, Federal Ministry of Justice Law Review Series)
- Towards A Better Administration of Justice System in Nigeria" (Edward Foakes Publishers, 1989)
- FMJL Review Series, "Women and Children Under Nigerian Law"
- FMJL Review Series, The Unification and Reform of the Nigerian Criminal Law and Procedure Codes – (Malthouse Press), 1990
- Law Development and Administration (Malthouse Press), 1990
- Narcotics: Law and Policy in Nigeria, FMJL Review Series 1990
- Perspectives on Human Rights in Nigeria FMJL Review Series 1991
- Perspectives on Corruption in Nigeria, FMJL Review Series 1992
- Democracy and the Law, FMJL Review Series, 1991
- The Citizens Report Card on Local Governments (with Omayeli Omatsola 1998)
- Economic, Social and Cultural Rights – A training Agenda for Nigeria (with Bankole Olubamise and Yinka Balogun, 1998) Legal Research and Resource Development Centre
- Annotated Rules of the Superior Courts of Nigeria (with Ade Ipaye) Lexis-Nexis Butterworths 2004
- Cross Examination: A Trial Lawyer's Most Potent Weapon (with Fola-Arthur Worrey) Lexis-Nexis Butterworths 2006

== See also ==
- List of Senior Advocates of Nigeria
- Vice President of Nigeria
- List of Nigerians

Political offices
Preceded by Namadi Sambo	Vice President of Nigeria; 2015–2023	Succeeded by Kashim Shettima
Preceded by Muhammadu Buhari	President of Nigeria; Acting; 2016	Succeeded by Muhammadu Buhari
Preceded by Muhammadu Buhari	President of Nigeria; Acting; 2017	Succeeded by Muhammadu Buhari
