= Henry Fajemirokun =

Nigerian businessman (1926–1978)

Chief Henry Fajemirokun CON
- Born: 26 July 1926; Ile-Oluji, Ondo State, Nigeria
- Died: 15 February 1978 (aged 51); Abidjan, Côte d'Ivoire
- Other name: Chief Fajemirokun
- Occupation: Businessman
- Years active: 1948—1978
- Known for: Henry Stephens, Rank Xerox Nigeria, Nigerian-American Merchant Bank, ECOWAS
- Children: Dele Fajemirokun

Chief Henry Oloyede Fajemirokun, CON (26 July 1926 – 15 February 1978) was a Nigerian trade unionist who later became a prominent industrialist and businessman. He was one of the country's leading indigenous entrepreneurs who established and built one of the foremost private sector business concerns in his time. He was also a major promoter of West Africa's economic integration alongside Adebayo Adedeji, which subsequently led to the formation of the Economic Community of West African States.

Fajemirokun saw the need for a well-organised private sector and was devoted to developing and strengthening the private sector, he expended considerable resources to advance the activities of the Chamber of Commerce and Industry Movement within Nigeria, West Africa and the Commonwealth.

Fajemirokun held various positions in the Chamber of Commerce and industry Movement. He was the 4th President of the Nigerian Association of Chambers of Commerce, Industry, Mines and Agriculture (NACCIMA), The 6th President of the Lagos Chamber of Commerce and Industry, the 1st President of the Federation of West African Chambers of Commerce (1972–1978) and the co-founder and founding President of the Nigerian-British Chamber of Commerce (NBCC) alongside Sir Adam Thomson, the Chairman of British Caledonian Airways now part of British Airways). He was a member of the Board of Governors of and former President of Nigerian-American Chamber of Commerce. He was also the vice-president, Federation of Commonwealth Chambers of Commerce.

== Early life ==
Fajemirokun was born in Ile Oluji, Ondo State to the family of Daniel Famakinwa Fajemirokun and Felicia Adebumi Fajemirokun (née Akinsuroju) (b.1891), daughter of High Chief Odofin Oganbule Akinsuroju and Madam Adesemi Akinsuroju, and granddaughter of Omoba Adebamigbei (whose father was the Jegun of Ile Oluji).

Fajemirokun was educated at St.Peter's School, Ile-Oluji and then at St Luke's School, Oke-igbo for his primary education. For his secondary education, he educated at CMS Grammar School, Lagos and then at Ondo Boys High School (1942–1944). After Ondo Boys school, he joined the Royal West African Frontier Force at the age of 18 and served in India during World War II. After the war, he joined the Post and Telegraph Department as a clerk and studied privately for his Cambridge School Certificate.

== Career ==
After serving during World War II, he began his career at the Post and Telegraph Department. He was a member of the workers' union in the department and rose to become President of the department's Ex-Servicemen's Union in 1948. In 1952, he became President of the Post and Telegraph's Clerical and Workers Allied Union.

Fajemirokun started private business in 1955 from a loan he received from a maternal relative. He entered the agricultural export sector, exporting cattle bones first then hides and skin, cocoa, rubber, coffee and shea nuts and imported primarily cement. He earned the trust of buyers who extended letters of credit to finance his business. He added other ventures into his business activities, in 1962, he started a maritime services firm. By 1960 he had become one of the largest importers of cement from Egypt and Poland. He received funding for this particular venture from a credit facility that had been provided to him by a British bank in London.

=== Henry Stephens ===
As the founder, chairman and largest shareholder of the Henry Stephens Group of companies, under his direction the company grew rapidly and diversified into several spheres such as cement and building materials, engineering, banking, insurance, shipping, ship broking and oil prospecting. He was a leading voice in industry and championed greater participation by Nigerians in the economy which was still dominated by foreign-owned concerns primarily in industry. Following a decision to in 1972, an indigenisation decree was promulgated by the Federal government to effect greater indigenous participation in different sectors of the economy. Although a strong proponent of greater indigenous participation, Fajemirokun was also cognizant of the need for continued foreign investment in the country and was vocal on maintaining a balance of both. Barring his failed bid to purchase a significant stake in the Daily Times. Fajemirokun did not participate in taking over any foreign concerns as a result of the indigenisation decrees in 1972 and 1977. Before 1972, he had already pioneered industries and expanded his business interests and was able to form partnerships and joint ventures with foreign firms. Fajemirokun's hard work and masterful timing served him well and enabled him to expand organically into other industries. For more than a decade the Henry Stephens Group had managed to successfully build up a solid network trading with firms in foreign countries such as the United Kingdom, United States of America, Poland, Japan, Belgium, Egypt, Germany and Brazil; and had built up strong relationships and business partnerships, representing or acquiring stakes in foreign owned firms in Nigeria prior to the euphoria of the contemporary nationalism at the time in form of the indigenisation decrees by the government.

The Group was well positioned to expand into other industries and by 1977 was in the process of establishing hotels, truck assembly plants, breweries and other manufacturing concerns including the acquisition and development of mining quarries for cement.

Groups such as his served to counter the competition from the Federal Military Government and foreign firms. The crowding out of the organized private sector by the FMG was vocally criticized because the belief was that the organized private sector was better suited to both manage the relationships with the foreign firms ensuring a longer-term commitment to the country rather than triggering an exodus and to negotiate a fair price for the value of the equity being sold down rather than capitulating to the demands of the FMG the time.

Fajemirokun led the negotiations to establish the first private merchant bank in the country Nigerian-American Merchant Bank Limited (NAMBL) bringing in First Bank of Boston (later Bank of Boston) alongside other indigenous investors. The bank was set up after his sudden death with the technical assistance and shareholding of Bank of Boston and Boston Overseas Financial Corporation (subsequently merged with Bank of America).

Fajemirokun was a pioneer in the Nigerian maritime industry and was the first indigenous company to own an interest in a shipping line. He established Henry Stephens Shipping Company and the Nigeria Shipping Company with two lines: Nigeria-Far East Line and the Nigeria-South America Line and acquired three drybulk ships. The Nigeria- South America Line provided liner services between Brazil and the Nigerian Far East Line provided liner services to Japan and the Far East.

Fajemirokun also ventured into commodity brokerage and in 1969 he bought and held a seat on the London Stock Exchange.

Fajemirokun's company Henry Stephens was a pioneer in Nigerian Oil industry as the first indigenous private oil company to get an offshore exploration license in the country's first ever offshore licensing round of oil prospecting licenses (OPL) in 1970. Bidding was opened between 26 February and 18 March on about 7000 square miles of the continental shelf. Twenty seven blocks were offered composed of areas relinquished according to leasing regulations 30 November 1968 plus additional deeper water acreage up to the 200 fathom line on the outer shelf. A total of 106 bids from over 30 oil companies or groups were made for these continental shelf OPLs. In July, Newcomers to Nigeria were offered blocks. Only 15 blocks were offered covering only half of the open area. The remaining blocks said to be the most prospective, were reserved for the proposed national oil company Nigerian National Oil Corporation (NNOC) which was established officially in 1972 .Other winners of the licensing round were Deminex a German Consortium, Occidental Petroleum, Japan Petroleum Company and Monsanto.

The Group acquired the sole distributorship for Rank Xerox (now Xerox), forming a joint venture with the Anglo-American company Rank Xerox (itself a joint venture between Rank Organisation of the United Kingdom and the Xerox Corporation of the United States of America).

Fajemirokun was a co-founder and played a key role in developing and promoting ECOWAS Bank what was to become Ecobank Transnational (ETI), however he died before its launch was finalized.

As an active investor he became a major shareholder in leading companies in Nigeria and abroad. He was denied the opportunity to acquire the Daily Times of Nigeria from the British International Publishing Corporation, (IPC) known as the "Daily Mirror Group" who owned the title by the Obasanjo junta. Henry Stephens also was a core investor in Johnson Wax and acquired stakes Fan Milk and two notable construction companies.

Fajemirokun was also a director of First Bank Nigeria Limited, director Nigeria Krafts Bags Limited, non-executive director Nigerian Diversified Investments, director Nigeria Sewing Machine Manufacturing Company Limited. He was Chairman of the Lagos State Tourism Advisory Committee.

== Philanthropy and awards ==
Fajemirokun was an active philanthropist in the community and church, giving to charitable causes both in Nigeria and abroad, particularly South Africa. During the Nigerian civil war he was active in supporting the Red Cross and led other initiatives to help those in need. He made several donations to educational and community institutions. He gave and donated generously to individuals, communities, the Red Cross Movement, Religious Organizations, Universities, State Development Funds, Students’ Clubs, Youth Organizations and the Southern African Relief Fund to which he personally donated ₦110,000 (One Hundred and Ten Thousand Naira) in January 1977 .

Fajemirokun contributions were recognised and in 1968, Fajemirokun was awarded the chieftaincy title of Yegbata of Ile-Oluji by his traditional sovereign, the Jegun, thus making him a tribal aristocrat of the Yoruba people. He was later made the Asiwaju of Oke-Igbo (1971), the Lijoka of Ondo (1973), the Orunta of Ifewara (1974) and the Obaloro of Ado Ekiti (1977). In 1972, The University of Ife (now Obafemi Awolowo University, Ife) also conferred on him the Honorary Degree of Doctor of Science in Business Administration in recognition of his significant contributions to the academic and business communities.

For his contributions to the development of Commerce and Industry in the country, five years after his death in 1983 the Federal Government honoured him with a posthumous national award of the Commander of the Order of the Niger (CON).

== Death ==
On 15 February 1978, whilst leading a trade mission he died in Abidjan, Cote d’Ivoire.
