= Mobolaji Bank Anthony =

Yoruba Nigerian businessman and philanthropist

Oloye Sir Mobolaji Bank Anthony K.B.E
- Born: 11 June 1907; Congo
- Died: 26 May 1991 (aged 83); Lagos, Nigeria
- Other name: Mobolaji Bank-Anthony
- Occupation: Businessman
- Years active: 1929-1991
- Known for: Entrepreneurship and philanthropy
- Spouse(s): Lamide, Lady Bank Anthony
- Children: Omoseri Bank Anthony, Ajibike Bank Anthony, Dame Oremi Evans, Bolaji Bank Anthony
- Parent: Alfred Bank Anthony

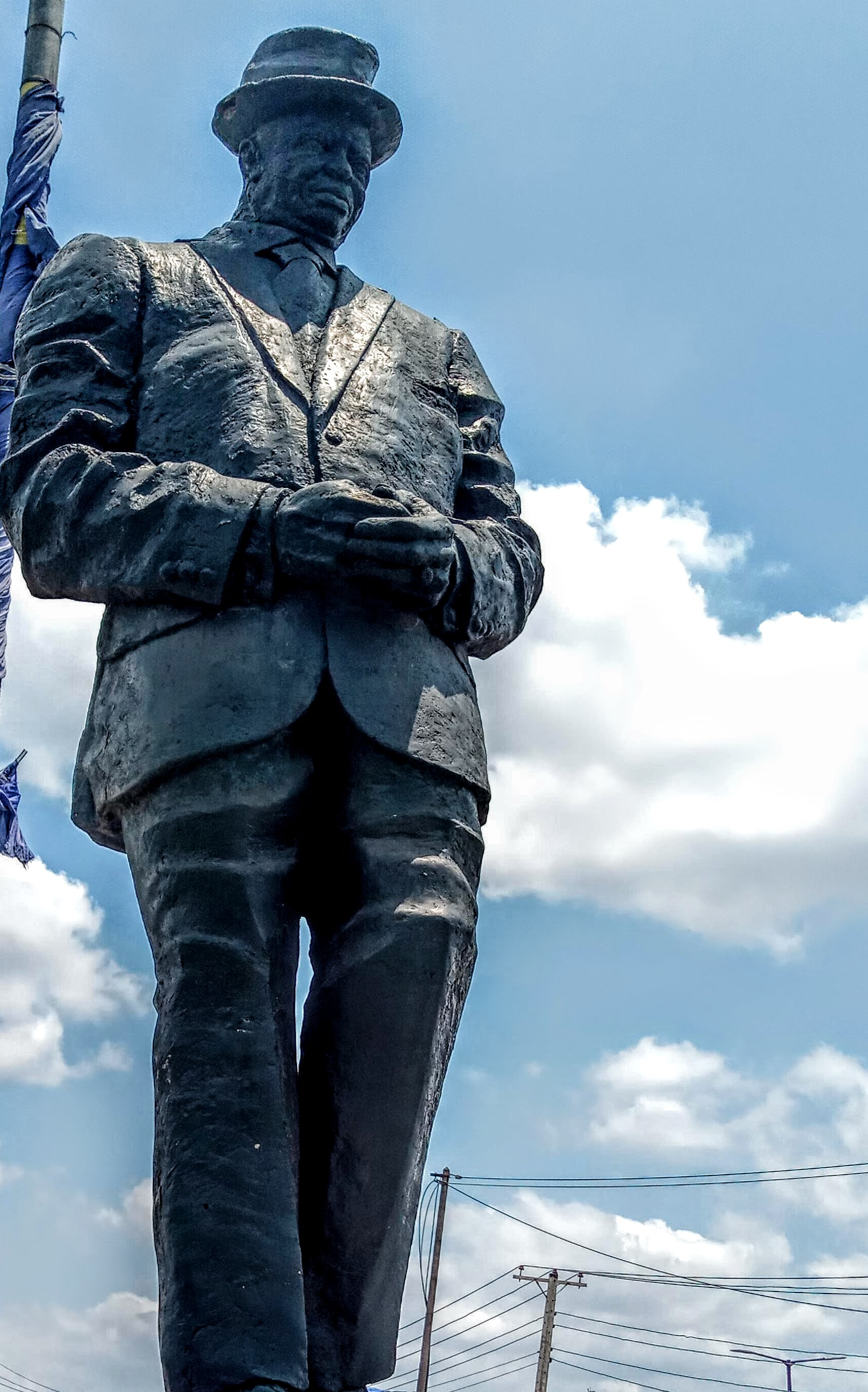
Statue of Sir Mobolaji Bank Anthony in Lagos State

Sir Mobolaji Bank Anthony, KBE (11 June 1907 - 26 May 1991) was a Nigerian business tycoon and philanthropist. He was a President of the Nigerian Stock Exchange and was a minority investor in Aero-Contractors before indigenous shares were acquired by the Ibru Organisation. At one time, he held the distributional rights to cars manufactured by Rootes Group. He was a board member of various companies and was a fellow of the Nigerian Institute of Management.

== Life ==
Bank Anthony was born to the family of Alfred Bank Anthony of Brazilian quarters, Lagos Island; his mother was related to the Aleshinloye Williams family of Olowogbowo, Lagos and both parents were businesspeople; his father had an undertaker business under the name, A. Bank Anthony and Sons Ltd. He was born in the Kinshasa region of Belgian Congo in 1907. He started education at St. Peters School, Faji, Lagos and later attended various secondary schools including Methodist Boys High School, Lagos, Ijebu Ode Grammar School, CMS Grammar School and Baptist Academy, Lagos. In 1923, he started work as a junior clerk in the correspondence section of the Post and Telegraphs Department (P&T). He left the P&T dept in 1931 and switched to business. He traveled to Germany and England to study palm oil making and later established M. de Bank Brothers, a general merchant firm originally trading in Palm Oil and then patent medicine. After both businesses were not very successful, he switched to importing watches, clocks and fountain pens. At one time, he was the third largest seller of fountain pens in Nigeria after UAC and the United Trading Company. In the early 1930s, he was briefly involved with the Lagos Youth Movement. Bank Anthony's business began to pick up at the onset of World War II when prices rose in the country benefiting traders like Bank Anthony who had large reserves of goods before the inflationary pressures.

In the 1950s he brought in a few European firms to Nigeria and was one of the earliest Nigerians to become chairman of a European company when in 1950, after introducing an Italian firm to the Nigerian market, he became chairman of the Italian Construction firm Borini Prono and Company. The firm was later involved in the construction of the Ijora Causeway, Benin-Asaba road and the Sapele-Onithsa road. He was also the agent of Law Union and rock Insurance Agency in 1950 which was later managed by T.A. Braithwaite in 1951. He was also a director of the Nigerian arm of Mobil Oil Company and was also a director of the Nigerian branch of Friesland Foods.

Bank Anthony acquired shares in a few companies during his business career including Weide Nigeria Limited that dealt with completely knocked down electrical parts, an Italian partnership called Motor Parts Industries, a plywood business venture in Cross River State and the Nigerian arm of May and Baker, Pressed Metal Works.

== Philanthropy ==
Bank Anthony donated a ward to the National Orthopaedic Hospital, Igbobi, Lagos and also built Ayinke House, which houses the Ikeja General Hospital.

== Personal life ==
Bank Anthony was married to Olamide Adeshigin, later known as Lady Bank Anthony. He belonged to a few social and business clubs in Lagos, including the Lagos Race Club, Metropolitan Club, Yoruba Tennis Club and the Nigerian-American Chamber of Commerce. He was chairman of the Federal Rehabilitation Appeal Board established by Yakubu Gowon to assist Nigerians affected by the Civil War and of the National Stadium Management Board established by Nnamdi Azikiwe to oversee the National Stadium, Lagos.
