= Akinsuroju Nelson =

Nigerian politician

Akinsuroju Nelson is a Nigerian politician. He member of the Ondo State House of Assembly representing Ileoluji/Okeigbo constituency. His election victory was contested by Babatunde Fadare of the PDP, but the Appeal Court upheld Akinsuroju's win.
