= Ademola Rasaq Seriki =

Nigerian politician (1959–2022)

Chief Demola Seriki CON

Ambassador of Nigeria to Spain
- In office January 2021 – December 2022

Personal details
- Born: 30 November 1959 Lagos, Nigeria
- Died: 15 December 2022 (aged 63) Madrid, Spain
- Party: All Progressives Congress

Chief Ademola Rasaq Seriki, CON, also known as Demola Seriki, (30 November 1959 – 15 December 2022) was a Nigerian politician, teacher, businessman, and public administrator. He served until his death as the Nigerian ambassador to Spain, a position he assumed in January 2021, with concurrent accreditation as a permanent representative of Nigeria to the United Nations World Tourism Organization (UNWTO). He previously served as Nigeria's Minister of State for Defence.

== Early career ==
In 1978, Seriki started his career as a clerical officer in the Lagos City Council, City Hall, Lagos, and had a brief stint at the International Bank for West Africa Ltd (IBWA), now Afribank.

As a junior public servant, Seriki was not satisfied with his clerical job, because his secondary school qualification would not guarantee him promotion into the senior ranks of public service. So, he proceeded to New York where he studied for and earned Bachelor of Arts and Master of Science degrees in accounting, Finance, and Management from the City University of New York. He also attended Harvard University's John F. Kennedy School of Government, where he completed a Senior Executive Education and earned a certificate in National and International Security.

Upon completion of his studies, from 1984 to 1986 Seriki became a teacher and counselor at New York's John F. Kennedy High School, Walton High School, and Springfield Gardens High School, teaching accounting and business mathematics.

Seriki was a qualified teacher in business, accounting and mathematics.

From 1986 to 1987, he worked at the Rochester, New York, firm of Koskolowsky and Co. (certified public accountants), as Assistant Manager (Auditing). He was also Customer Representative/Assistant Manager at Dollar Dry Dock Bank, New York City.

== Nigerian public service ==
On returning to Nigeria, Seriki joined Equity and Trust Finance Company Limited, from 1987, as business manager until he was appointed chairman of the Lagos State Sports Council in 1992; a position he held until 1994. More than anywhere else in Nigeria at the time, Seriki's tenure as chairman of the sports council coincided with political instability in Nigeria during the struggle for democratic rule by the National Democratic Coalition, Nigeria, (NADECO) and civil society organisations, following the then military junta's annulment of Nigeria's general elections won by M.K.O. Abiola. This period witnessed regular youth demonstrations and riots on the streets of Lagos.

In spite of the political instability, Seriki was instrumental in engaging young talent in sporting activities at the state and national levels. He applied his experiences as a grassroots organiser to orient local youth towards sporting activities, with educational institutions as platforms for youth participation in grassroots sports development programmes. Hence, Seriki was named Best State Chairman of Sports Council, for 1993, by the Nigerian Basketball Federation (NBBF). He was granted Honorary Life Membership in the Table Tennis Association in 1993, in recognition of his public administration expertise and passion for sports development in Lagos State.

With the Nigerian military due to hand over power (which they ultimately failed to do) in 1993, to elected civilians, Seriki left public service to start the Perpetual Investment and Finance Company Limited (PIFCO), as well as to launch a career in politics. The annulment of the 12 June 1993 general elections had led him into private business. From 1994 to 1999, Seriki was vice president of Rosedale New York based Perpetual Associates International (USA) Inc. (an international consulting firm serving multinational oil and aviation companies). He returned to PIFCO Nigeria Limited, from 1999 to 2007, as executive director for Business Development and Marketing.

== Politics ==
In 1992, Seriki was the senatorial candidate for Lagos Central District constituency, on the platform of the defunct National Republican Convention (NRC)

In 1998, he was elected a member of the federal House of Representatives from the Lagos Island federal constituency on the ticket of the defunct United Nigeria Congress Party (UNCP). This victory was short-lived, with the abrupt end of the General Abacha regime and the inception of General Abdulsalam Abubakar's transitional regime.

With the emergence of the 4th Republic, he was appointed a National Fund Raising Committee member in the Peoples Democratic Party (PDP) for the 1999 National elections. The PDP also appointed him as a member of the Candidate and Party Relations Committee for the Obasanjo/Atiku presidential election. From 2000 to 2002, Demola Seriki emerged as the PDP Party Chairman of Lagos Island Local Government Area, and later, in 2003, as the party's flag bearer to the House of Assembly, representing Lagos Island federal constituency. In 2005, he began serving as Secretary of the Lagos State PDP Disciplinary Committee. In 2005, until 2006, he was appointed the Lagos State vice-chairman of the PDP, after which, in 2007, he campaigned to become senator for the Lagos Central senatorial district.

Seriki's campaign sought to ensure education and gainful employment of youths in his district. His political vision aimed to ensure quality education for youths in the rundown areas of his senatorial district, by gaining the support of the federal government through special federal government support schemes, to rejuvenate literacy in such densely populated parts of Lagos State described by him as the most cosmopolitan and populated in Nigeria. Seriki also sought to advance gender sensitivity in politics and in public service opportunities. These key issues—along with housing, infrastructure development, and security—have remained cornerstones of his approach to politics.

In 2011, Seriki defected from the PDP to the Action Congress of Nigeria.

== Political appointments ==
=== Nigerian Ambassador to the Kingdom of Spain (2021–2022) ===
In early 2021, Seriki was appointed by President Muhammadu Buhari as Nigeria's ambassador to Spain.

=== Minister of State for Interior (2009–2010) ===
Seriki worked in tandem with the Minister of Interior in the formulation and implementation of policies towards the realization of the ministry's mandate. He chaired the Nigerian Civil Defence, Immigration, and Prisons Services Board and assisted in overseeing areas such as coordinating and ensuring harmony with the ministry's mandate. He was responsible for overseeing the Nigeria Prison Service, Federal Fire Service, Seaman Identity Certificate, and Registration of Marriages, according to governing laws of Nigeria.

=== Minister of State for Defence (2008–2009) ===
Seriki served as the Minister of State for Defence between 2008 and 2009. His responsibilities included overseeing the Military Pensions Board, in order to attain the objectives envisaged by the federal government. He, in tandem with the Minister of Defence, worked to formulate and implement policies within the purview of his mandated schedule.

Under Seriki, there was effective oversight of the operations of the Armed Forces Resettlement Scheme and the welfare of ex-service personnel—including the Nigerian legion. He also oversaw matters relating to the honourable interment of deceased Nigerian armed forces personnel in war graves, as well as the documentation and preservation of Nigerian military history in military museums, including maintenance of the National Cenotaph. He coordinated the annual commemorative activities of the Armed Forces Remembrance Day Celebrations.

During his tenure as minister of state, Seriki was appointed chairman of the Defence Health Maintenance Limited, a holding company for military health maintenance initiatives. During this time, he was also the chairman of the Ministry of Defence HIV/USDoD joint initiative to ameliorate the lives of HIV/AIDS-infected servicemen and their families. He was a member of the Joint Development Authority of Nigeria-São Tomé and Príncipe.

Finally and significantly, he was responsible for the supervision of the joint services organisations and parastatals, such as the Nigerian Defence Academy, Armed Forces Command and Staff College, National War College, Defence Industry Corporation of Nigeria (DICON), Nigerian Armed Forces Resettlement centre (NAFRC), and the Tafawa Balewa Square Investment Limited.

=== Supervising Minister for Mines and Steel Development (2008–2008) ===
Seriki had a short but remarkable stint holding this portfolio. He undertook various national initiatives through his supervision of the privatization of federal government enterprises in the solid minerals, steel, and aluminium industries. He advised the federal government on key matters relating to policy formulation and implementation to realize set growth indices in such industries. Seriki oversaw activities of Nigerian parastatals such as the Geological Surveys Agency of Nigeria, the Nigerian coal corporation joint venture Enugu, the National steel and raw materials agency Kaduna, the national metallurgical development centre Jos, the metallurgical training institute Onitsha, Ajaokuta Steel Company Limited, and the National Iron Ore Mining Company Limited. He was also key to ratifying the decisions of the Ministerial Tenders Board and the Procurement Planning Committee.

=== Minister of State for Agriculture and Water Resources (2007–2008) ===
During this, Seriki's first appointment to national service, he worked alongside the minister in setting out policies on the agriculture and water resources needed to galvanise the employment, industrial, and social development of this sector of the Nigerian economy. He helped focus on the development and review of the National Water Resources Master Plan and also helped oversee ministerial activities in cash food crop production; livestock, fishery, agricultural research; agricultural disease control; agricultural statistics; strategic food reserve; and the distribution of essential inputs schedules within the ministry. Under his watch he ensured the aggressive implementation of the national policies and water resources development and distribution through irrigation dams, underground water supply, and water resources research and statistics programmes. He coordinated bilateral relations with governments on water resources and supervised activities of the river basin development authorities and the National Water Resources Institute. He was also elected the chairman of the council of ministers of the Niger Basin Authority (NBA) in Niamey, Niger, in 2008. He was prominent as the country's spokesperson on agricultural sector engagements at regional and international levels.

== Other roles ==
Seriki has had stints in federal ministerial positions in the interest of Nigeria's national development. In collaboration with the U.S. Ambassador to Nigeria major assistance has been provided for Military personnel and their families who have HIV/AIDS related conditions. Seriki was a member of Action Congress of Nigeria (ACN), a director of Cappa and D'Abberto (civil engineers), and the chairman of PIFCO Nigeria Limited. Seriki was an alumnus and fellow of Harvard University. He was a member of the Nigerian-American Chamber of Commerce. He belonged to the Yoruba Tennis Club, the Ikoyi Club 1938, the Island Club, F's Club, IBB Golf and Country Club, and the Lagos Yacht Club.

== Personal life and death ==
Seriki was married to his wife Oluremi. Later he would marry Wosilat Okoya, the sister of industrialist Rasaq Okoya before later marrying Princess Sholape Demola-Seriki. The union was Blessed with two Children. His daughter Farida, stage name Kah-Lo, is a Grammy-nominated singer.

He died in Madrid, Spain on 15 December 2022, at the age of 63.

== Traditional title ==
In May 2009, the Oba of Lagos Rilwan Akiolu conferred on Seriki the chieftaincy title of the Otun Aare of Lagos.
