= Groundwater in Nigeria =

Vital water source for Nigerians

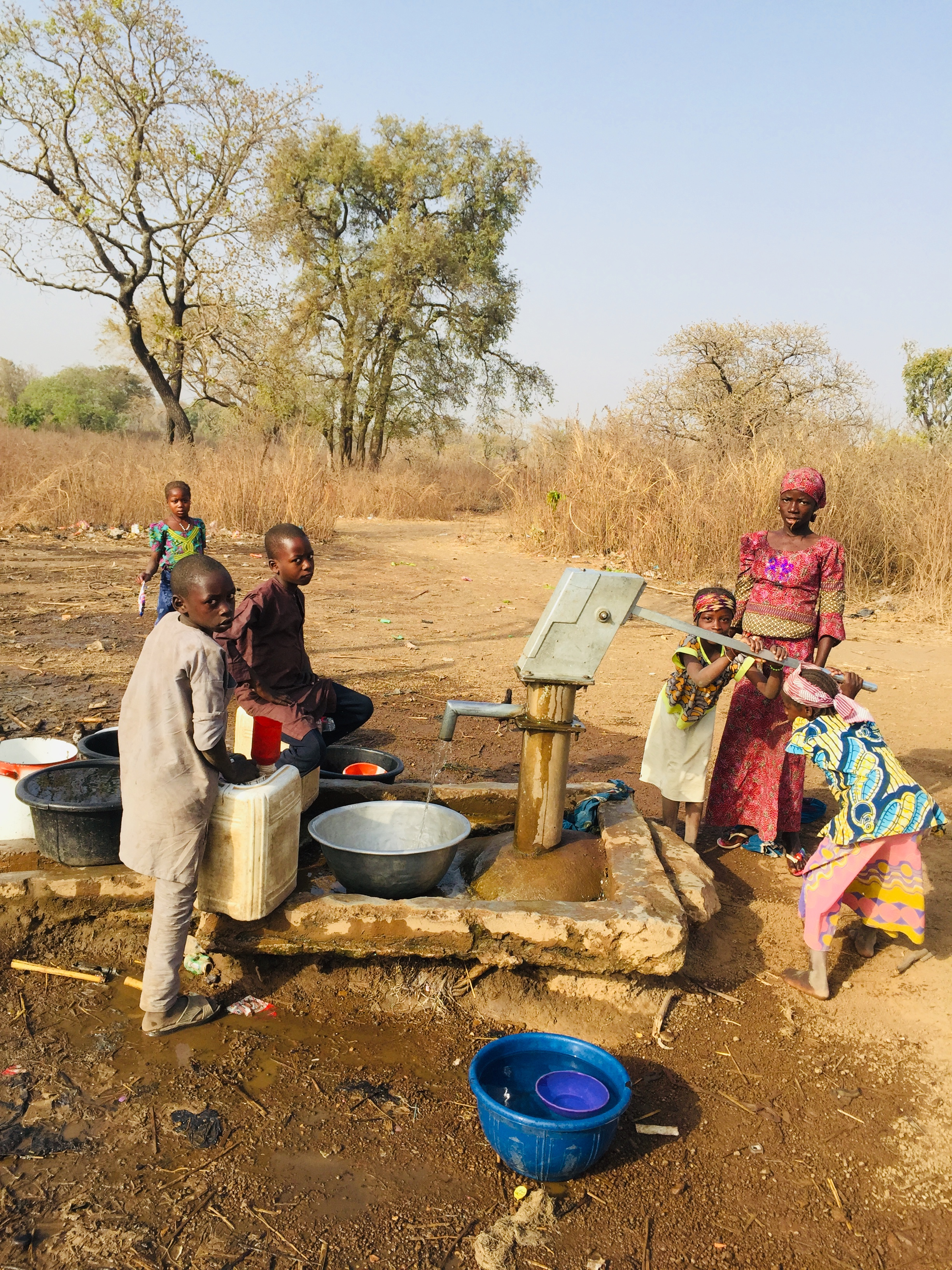
The drill scene in the village.

Groundwater in Nigeria is widely used for domestic, agricultural, and industrial supplies. The Joint Monitoring Programme for Water Supply and Sanitation estimate that in 2018 60% of the total population were dependent on groundwater point sources for their main drinking water source: 73% in rural areas and 45% in urban areas. The cities of Calabar and Port Harcourt are totally dependent on groundwater for their water supply.

In 2013, there were around 65,000 boreholes in Nigeria extracting an estimated 6,340,000 m^{3}/day. The majority of these (almost 45,000) were equipped with hand pumps and used for water supply in rural areas and small towns.

Estimates of total renewable groundwater resources in Nigeria are variable. The United Nations Food and Agriculture Organization (FAO) estimates that Nigeria has 87,000 Million m^{3}/year of renewable groundwater resources. Japan International Cooperation Agency (JICA) estimate that total annual groundwater recharge is 155,800 Million m^{3}/year. Recharge is variable across the country and largely controlled by climate: recharge is lower in the north of the country due to higher evapotranspiration and lower rainfall.

== Groundwater Environments ==
=== Geology ===
The geology of Nigeria includes large areas where Precambrian basement rocks are present at the ground surface, and other large areas where the basement rocks are overlain by younger sedimentary rocks. In the north west, these sedimentary rocks largely consist of Tertiary and Cretaceous rocks of the Sokoto Basin (the south eastern part of the Iullemmeden Basin), which are made up of varying amounts of sandstone and clay, with lesser amounts of limestone. In the north east, Tertiary and Quaternary rocks of the Chad Basin comprise sandstone, siltstone and shale. In the centre of Nigeria, along the course of the Benue River and Niger River, are Tertiary and Cretaceous sedimentary rocks of the Benue and Nupe Basins. The Benue Basin consists of continental sandstones overlain by marine and estuarine shales and limestones, while the Nupe Basin largely contains continental sandstones, siltstones, claystones and conglomerates.

Along the coast, within the Niger Delta Basin, there are significant unconsolidated sediments of Tertiary to Quaternary age, comprising coarse to medium grained unconsolidated sands and gravels with thin peats, silts, clays and shales.

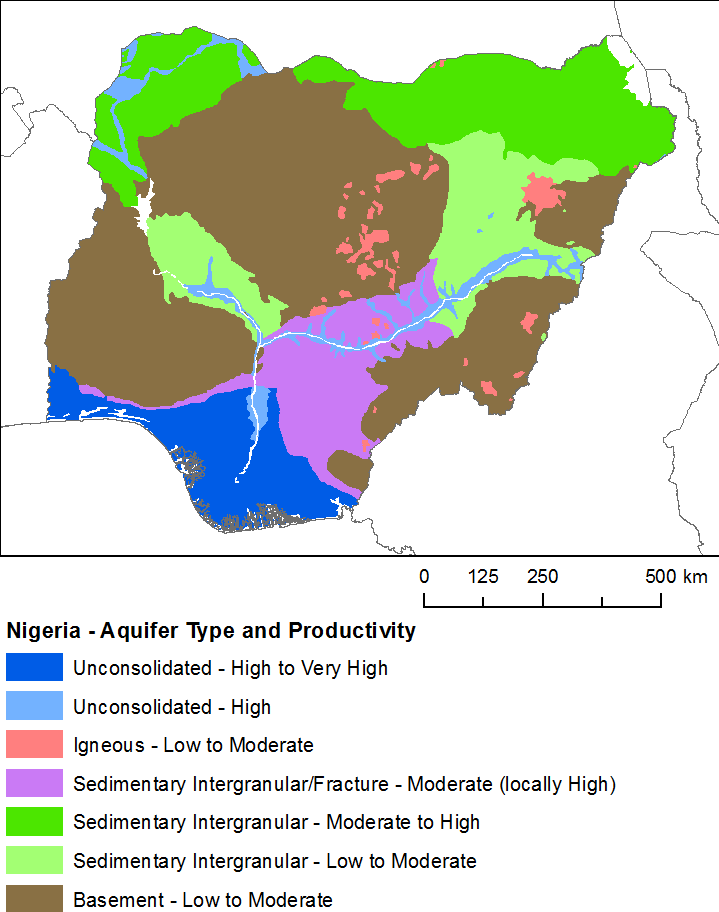
Hydrogeology of Nigeria at 1:5 Million Scale

=== Basement Aquifers ===
The basement rocks generally form low to moderate productivity aquifers where groundwater flow is concentrated in fractures, and often in a weathered mantle, which can develop in the upper few to tens of metres. Boreholes within basement aquifers are typically drilled to depths of 10–70 m, depending on local conditions. Water quality in these aquifers is generally good.

=== Sedimentary Aquifers ===
Rocks in the lower, more southerly part, of the Benue Basin form moderately productive aquifers where groundwater flow is concentrated in fractures. Borehole yields typically vary from 2 to 8 litres per second (l/s), but can be much higher or lower than this depending on the degree of fracturing and weathering. Aquifers tend to be localised and unconfined, with boreholes ranging from 40 to 150 m deep. Groundwater from these aquifers can be highly mineralised.

Rocks in the Upper Benue Basin typically form low to moderate productivity aquifers, with borehole yields varying between 1 and 5 L/s. Groundwater flow is largely intergranular and boreholes can vary in depth from 30 to 300 m. Groundwater quality is generally good.

Rocks in the Nupe Basin form low to moderately productive aquifers. Groundwater flow predominantly occurs through pore spaces in the rocks, which are generally fine grained and slightly cemented, limiting groundwater potential. Where coarser sandstones dominate, yields of 2 to 4 L/s can be achieved; basal conglomerate beds may support higher yields.

Borehole yields in rocks of the Sokoto Basin are highly variable, but can be moderate to highly productive where coarser sandstones dominate. Lower sandstones can be confined while upper sandstone layers are typically unconfined.

The Chad Formation, found in the Chad Basin, forms a moderate to highly productive aquifer, with yields up to 30 L/s recorded. Groundwater flow is largely intergranular and aquifers can be unconfined or confined depending on local conditions. Deeper sandstone layers are often confined. The Gombe Formation, also in the Chad Basin, has much lower permeability providing yields of around 1 to 5 L/s. Natural water quality from both these formations is generally good.

=== Igneous Aquifers ===
Volcanic rocks also occur in Nigeria, forming low to moderately productive aquifers. Borehole yields are typically less than 3 L/s and may be drilled to depths of around 15 to 50 m.

=== Unconsolidated Aquifers ===
Unconsolidated rocks, which predominantly occur in the coastal Niger Delta Basin and along major river valleys, form high to very high productivity aquifers. Alluvial aquifers are largely unconfined with shallow water tables and are thickest (15 – 30 m) along the rivers Niger and Benue.

In the Niger Delta Basin, the upper Deltaic Formation is unconsolidated and largely unconfined with a shallow water table (0–10 m below ground level). The older Benin Formation is partly consolidated. It is largely unconfined (locally confined by lower permeability beds) with a water table typically between 3 and 15 m below ground level, but can be as much as 55 m deep. Aquifers in the Niger Delta Basin can provide yields from 3 to 60 L/s with borehole depths ranging from 10 to 800 m. Recharge is mostly directly from rainfall. Water quality issues include salinity, due to intrusion of sea water, iron, and pollution from human activities, particularly in urban areas.

== Groundwater Issues ==
=== Groundwater Availability ===
A 1996 survey by the Ministry of Water Resources found only 63% of boreholes in Nigeria were in working order, with many out of action due to pump failure.

There are local issues of over-abstraction of groundwater, causing lowering of groundwater levels and, in some cases, land subsidence. These are mainly in unconsolidated aquifers in urban areas in the coastal plain in the south, including in Lagos and Port Harcourt.

There are issues with drought causing lowering of groundwater levels, both seasonally in dry seasons, and during longer-term periods of low rainfall. This is particularly an issue for local, low storage basement aquifers, both in the north where rainfall is low and in the south, where rainfall is high. The potential impact of climate change on groundwater levels, combined with changing water demand, is recognised in the National Water Resources Master Plan.

=== Groundwater Quality ===
Groundwater pollution related to human activities (agriculture, domestic waste, industry) are issues in shallow aquifers, particularly permeable unconsolidated deposits, which have little protection from surface activities. Natural groundwater quality issues have also been recorded. Examples of this include high salinity in shallow alluvial aquifers due to dissolution of evaporate minerals and high iron and manganese concentrations in confined aquifers with low dissolved oxygen (i.e. anaerobic).

=== Transboundary Groundwater ===
There are several transboundary aquifers in Nigeria:

1. The Iullemeden, Taoudeni/Tanezrout Aquifer Systems (ITAS), shared by Algeria, Benin, Burkina Faso, Mali, Mauritania, Niger and Nigeria.
2. The Chad Basin Aquifer, shared by Cameroon, Central African Republic, Chad, Niger and Nigeria.
3. The Keta Basin Aquifers, shared by Ghana, Togo, Benin and Nigeria.
4. The Benue Trough, shared by Cameroon and Nigeria
5. The Rio Del Rey Basin, shared by Cameroon and Nigeria along the coast.

The Lake Chad Basin Commission manages issues related to the Chad Basin and a mechanism for the management of the Iullemeden Basin is in development, following a Memorandum of Understanding for establishing an integrated water resources management mechanism for this aquifer.

== Groundwater Management ==
There are many bodies with responsibility for groundwater management in Nigeria. They include:

- Nigeria Hydrological Services Agency (NIHSA) whose mandate is water resources (groundwater and surface water) assessment of the country; its quantity, quality, availability and distribution in time and space
- Nigeria Integrated Water Resources Management Commission (NIWRMC) that is responsible for regulation of water use and allocation
- The state Ministries of Water Resources and their Rural Water Supply and Sanitation Agencies (RUWATSSAN), responsible for provision of water to their various States
- The National Water Resources Institute, a parastatal of the Federal Ministry of Water Resources, has responsibility for training, research and data management relating to water in general.
- All the River Basin Development Authorities, which are also parastatals of the Federal Ministry of Water Resources involved in the provision of water supply to rural environments within their catchments.

The Nigerian Association of Hydrogeologists (NAH) is the professional body concerned with due process and best practices in the exploration, development and management of Nigeria's water resources. The NAH disseminates information on the state of the nation's water resources through annual conferences and a journal, Water Resources. Through membership of the Hydrology and Hydrogeology Subcommittee of the National Technical Committee on Water Resources (NTCWR), the technical arm of the National Council of Water Resources (NCWR), the NAH contributes to the development of water resources policies and legislation, including the Water Resources Act 100 and the Nigerian Standard for Drinking Water Quality.

The Nigeria Hydrological Services Agency (NIHSA), an agency of the Federal Ministry of Water Resources, has responsibility for groundwater monitoring. There is a national groundwater level monitoring programme with 43 monitoring points, 32 of which are equipped with data loggers. These are sited in basement and sedimentary aquifers. The frequency of monitoring at sites with data loggers is daily, and sometimes twice daily.

NIHSA has implemented a programme of drilling new monitoring boreholes for monitoring groundwater level. The new boreholes so far are focussed on sedimentary aquifers used for urban water supply; with borehole depths of 80 to 100 m. The groundwater level monitoring data are stored at NIHSA headquarters in Abuja.

The NIHSA is also responsible for water quality monitoring, but as yet a full programme is not in place due to lack of equipment.

The National Water Resources Master Plan recognises current problems in the effective acquisition and management of groundwater data, and recommends strategies for improving this situation.

== Sources ==
This article incorporates text from a free content work. Licensed under CC-BY-SA 3.0. Text taken from Africa Groundwater Atlas: Hydrogeology of Nigeria, Tijani M, Crane E, Upton K, O Dochartaigh BE, British Geological Survey.
