= Geology of Nigeria =

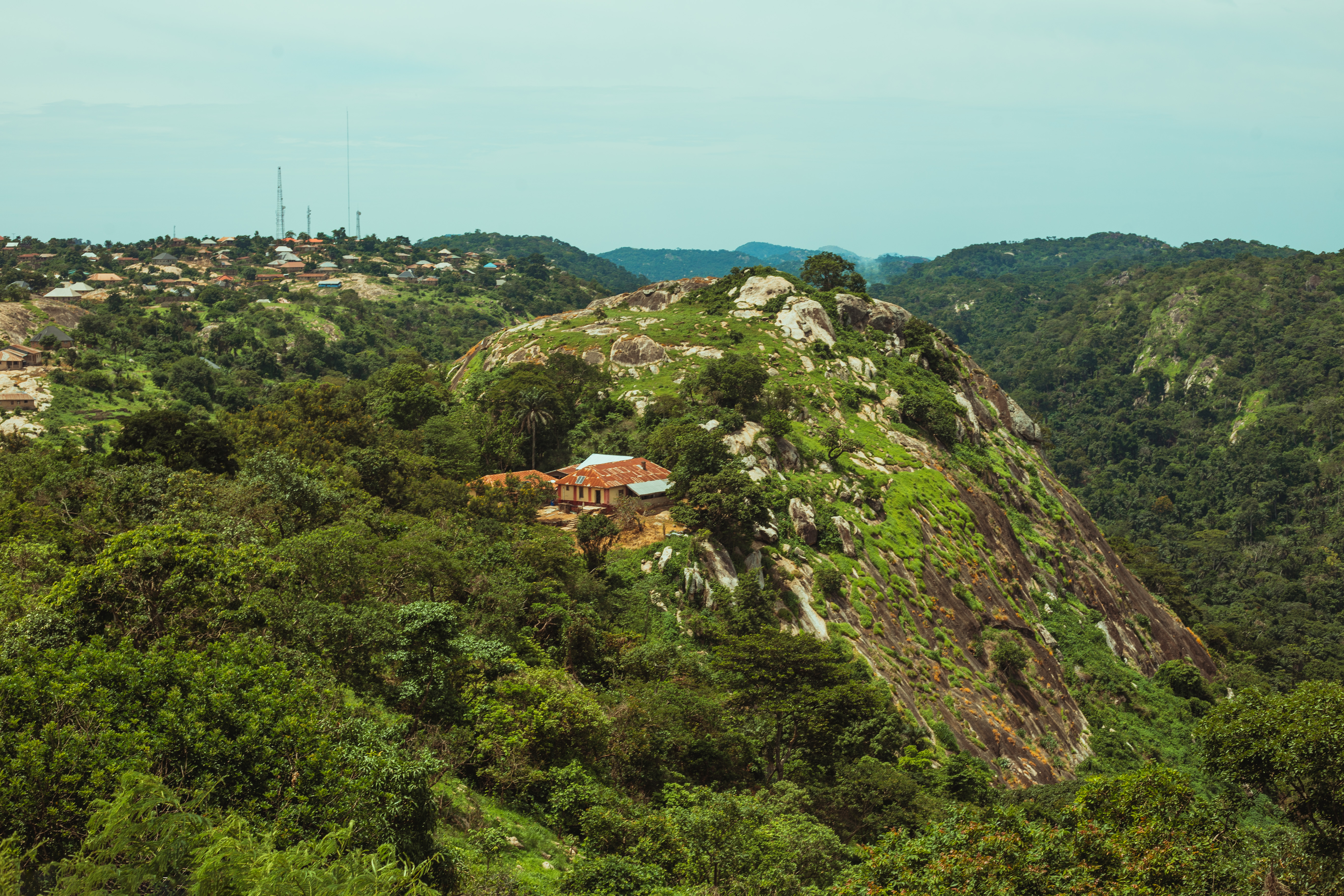
The Old House Rock

The geology of Nigeria formed beginning in the Archean and Proterozoic eons of the Precambrian. The country forms the Nigerian Province and more than half of its surface is igneous and metamorphic crystalline basement rock from the Precambrian. Between 2.9 billion and 500 million years ago, Nigeria was affected by three major orogeny mountain-building events and related igneous intrusions. Following the Pan-African orogeny, in the Cambrian at the time that multi-cellular life proliferated, Nigeria began to experience regional sedimentation and witnessed new igneous intrusions. By the Cretaceous period of the late Mesozoic, massive sedimentation was underway in different basins, due to a large marine transgression. By the Eocene, in the Cenozoic, the region returned to terrestrial conditions.

Nigeria has tremendous oil and natural gas resources housed in its thick sedimentary basins, as well as reserves of gold, lead, zinc, tantalite, columbite, coal and tin.

== Stratigraphy, tectonics and geologic history ==
The oldest Precambrian rocks in Nigeria likely formed during the Archean or the Paleoproterozoic, forming the Beninian gneiss, in the Benin-Nigeria Orogen, formed during the Proterozoic Pan-African orogeny. The crystalline basement rock of the country is grouped as the Nigerian Province, a southern continuation of the central Hoggar reactivated basement.

The ancient rocks of the Nigerian Province are split up by thrust and shear zones. The Migmatite-Gneiss Complex covers half of Nigeria's surface area and encompasses Archean gray gneisses, with tonalite and granodiorite consistencies. Within this complex are occurrences of schist, migmatite, garnet, sillimanite, kyanite and staurolite, which together indicate high-grade metamorphism up to the level of amphibolite on the sequence of metamorphic facies. Granites are associated with charnockite bodies and granulite facies metamorphism.

The Migmatite-Gneiss Complex differs in the Ibadan area, in the southwest. Banded gneiss, schist and quartzite formed from the metamorphism of greywacke, shale and interbedded sandstones. Some amphibolite layers record the metamorphosed remains of a tholeiitic magma series. The early folding and metamorphism in the Ibadan area was followed by the emplacement of aplite schist and microgranodiorite dikes during the Liberian orogeny 2.75 billion years ago. More intense deformation followed 2.2 billion years ago during the Eburnean orogeny.

Metazquartzites in the Ibadan area, likely from the Proterozoic, are overlain by pelite schist, intruded by mafic sills rich in magnesium. They are overlain by Neoproterozoic pelites, including phyllite and both muscovite and biotite schists, as well as quartzites that form strike ridges in several parts of Nigeria.

Younger metasediments are found in the southwest and northwest in synclinorial schist belts. Compared to the surrounding migmatite-gneiss complexes, these low-grade metamorphic rocks have isoclinal folding and steeply dipping foliation. They have faulted and sheared boundaries with the surrounding rock.

Geologists have interpreted these schist belts the remains of paleo-rift systems. The Pan-African orogeny in the late Proterozoic affected all of the Archean and Paleoproterozoic rocks in the region. Continent-continent collision and eastward subduction affected the southern Trans-Saharan mobile belt and emplaced granitoids throughout the Nigerian Province. In Nigeria, Pan-African orogeny related granite, syenite and diorite intrusions formed between 700 and 500 million years ago and are known as the Older Granites.

=== Paleozoic (541-251 million years ago) ===
In the Cambrian, at the beginning of the Paleozoic, volcanic debris filled molasse grabens, forming dacite and shoshonite, as the Older Granites continued to emplace. In some cases, granite intrusions formed large batholiths and charnockite. The end of the Pan-African orogeny was also accompanied by the intrusion of basalt and dolerite dikes.

=== Mesozoic (251-66 million years ago) ===
In the Mesozoic, during the Jurassic, ring complexes known as the Younger Granites intruded Neoproterozoic and Paleozoic basement rocks in the Jos Plateau, as well as in the Air region in Niger. The Younger Granites are primarily alkali-feldspar granites, although the ring complexes also include rhyolite, gabbro and syenite. The ring dikes tend to be highly mineralized and enriched in niobium and tin.

Large sedimentary basins formed in southern Nigeria, divided by the Okitipupa Ridge. The basins did not begin to fill with sediment until the Albian age of the Cretaceous. In the southeast, poorly bedded sandy shale alternates with layers of sandstone and sandy limestone, containing ammonite, radiolarian, echinoid and gastropod fossils. Subsequently, some of these sedimentary rock layers experienced lead and zinc mineralization.

The arkose sandstone, limestone and shale of the 600 meter thick Odukpani Formation formed during the Cenomanian until the early Turonian, in the vicinity of modern-day Calabar. Fish teeth, ammonites and echinoids date the Eze-Aku Formation to the Turonian, while the blue-gray shales and marl limestone of the Awgu Formation dates to the Coniacian. During the Santonian age of the Cretaceous, sea levels dropped. However, by the Campanian and the Maastrichtian, the Nkporo Formation records shale, mudstone, limestone and sandstones formed in an offshore environment. In other parts of Nigeria, the Owelli Sandstone, Enugu Shale and Asata Shale formed around the same time in shallow water environments. Other formations of similar age include the ammonite-bearing coals of Mamu Formation and the Nsukka Formation, both from the Maastrichtian.

The Maastrichtian age brought a large marine transgression to southwest Nigeria, depositing the Abeokuta Formation. The Iullemeden Basin, also known as the Sokoto Basin spans Mali, western Niger, northwest Nigeria and northern Benin and began accumulating sediments in the Jurassic, followed by the Maastrichtian Rima Group, which records a brackish environment. Approximately one-tenth of the Chad Basin is situated in Nigeria. Albian Bima sandstone lie unconformably atop Precambrian basement rock, followed by the Turonian limestone and shale sequences of the Gongila Formation. Marine shales of the Fika Formation formed during the Senonian. The Maastrichtian brought a shift to an estuary environment, leading to the deposition of the Gombe Sandstones, which are intercalated with ironstone, siltstone and shales.

=== Cenozoic (66 million years ago-present) ===
High sea levels continued into the early Cenozoic. In the west, the Akinbo Formation and Ewekoro Formation both deposited in the Paleocene, while the Ino Formation took shape atop the Nsukka in the east, with layers of thick, clay shale. The Sokoto Group in the Iullemeden Basin contains marine sediments. However, by the Eocene, sea levels retreated and afterward Nigeria mainly experienced terrestrial sedimentation.

Around the end of the Cretaceous and the start of the Cenozoic, the sedimentary rocks in the Chad Basin were folded into anticlines and synclines. Erosion created an unconformity with younger rocks. Terrestrial sediments built up in the Paleocene Kerri Kerri Formation, followed by Pliocene lake sediments of the Chad Formation.

== Hydrogeology ==
Unconsolidated sediments 15 to 30 meters thick line the Niger and Benue rivers and are recharged from rainwater, along with the near surface, shallow aquifers of the Niger Delta Basin and the partially consolidated Benin Formation. In central and eastern Nigeria, regional occurrences of volcanic rock contain groundwater in fractures, less than five meters deep.

Most of Nigeria's large sedimentary basins have intergranular flow, rainwater recharge and few water quality issues. Within the Chad Basin, the Chad Formation is unconfined in some locations, with artesian flow from some deeper layers and a water table depth of 10 to 15 meters. The Gombe Sandstone is comparatively low permeability and the deeper Kerri-Kerri Formation remains poorly studied. The water table in the Sokoto Group varies widely between 20 and 100 meters deep, unconfined near the surface and confined in lower layers of the Gwandu Formation. Within the Sokoto Group, the Wurno Formation has moderate yields and limited recharge, while the Gundumi Formation conglomerates are good aquifers, with artesian conditions, bounded by deeper clay layers. Other sedimentary aquifers include the Nupe Basin, Upper Benue Basin and Lower Benue Basin.

Precambrian crystalline basement rock supports regional aquifers in weathered zones, 10 to 25 meters thick, as well as in fractures. In particular, metasedimentary rocks often weather to be clay rich, forming aquitards.

== Natural resource geology ==
Nigeria has extensive natural resources and is the largest crude oil producer in Africa and 20 billion barrels of reserves. As such, petroleum is central to economy of Nigeria, producing 80 percent of government revenues and 95 percent of export earnings. Additionally, Nigeria has 2.6 trillion cubic meters of natural gas and a high overall gas to oil ratio. Seventy percent of both oil and gas resources are onshore.

The country also has extensive mineral deposits, although most are under-exploited. According to the Geological Survey of Nigeria Agency, Nigeria has some 34 known major mineral deposits across the country. Exploration of solid minerals like tin, niobium, lead, zinc and gold, goes back for more than 90 years, but there has been a world-wide scale production of tin and niobium only.

Gold mines were active before World War II, extracting from crystalline basement rock in the northwest, but a combination of low gold prices and legal turmoil ended the industry, recently the demand for gold has gone up due its high prices and Gold can be found in commercial quantity in states like Osun, Zamfara and Cross River states in Nigeria. The Younger Granites of the Jos Plateau contain significant tin deposits, mined since before European colonization. However, in recent years, tin mining has been significantly curtailed by flooding in the mines and low tin prices, as well as water pollution from the mines. Tantalite and columbite are both associated with the tin ore in the plateau.

The states of Anambra, Benue, Plateau and Taraba have small-scale lead and zinc mining, from deposits that also have large quantities of cadmium, arsenic and antimony. Barite veins commonly contain lead and zinc in Plateau State and other parts of eastern Nigeria. Kwara State has iron ore in Agbaja Plateau and Itakpe Hills.

Nigeria also has other resources useful for energy and construction, including a poorly understood lignite belt in the south, kaolin, gypsum and feldspar. Coal mining provided much of the country's energy between 1915 and 1960, although the industry has been in a long-running decline, now providing energy only for small-scale kilns and smelters.
