= Pius Olakunle Osunyikanmi =

Nigerian civil servant (1971–2026)

Director General, Nigerian Technical Aid Corps (also known as Directorate of Technical Aid Corps), Ministry of Foreign Affairs
- In office August 15, 2013 – 22 August 2023
- Preceded by: Ambassador Mamman Daura
- Succeeded by: Rt. Hon. Yusuf Buba Yakub

Special Adviser to President on International Relations
- In office 2011–2013

Ondo State Commissioner of Education
- In office 2010–2011
- Governor: Olusegun Mimiko
- Preceded by: Adenike Fatogun

Personal details
- Born: 3 August 1971 Ile Oluji, Ondo State, Nigeria
- Died: 24 October 2026 (aged 55)
- Party: All Progressive Congress (APC)
- Education: Ondo State University, University of Ibadan, Adekunle Ajasin University

Pius Olakunle Osunyikanmi (3 August 1971 – 24 October 2026) was a Nigerian civil servant who was the Director General of Nigerian Technical Aid Corps (also known as Directorate of Technical Aid Corps), from 15 August 2013 to 22 August 2023.

Osunyikanmi was first appointed by President Goodluck Ebele Jonathan in 2013 and re-appointed by President Muhammadu Buhari in 2018.

Technical Aid Corps is a Nigerian federal government agency responsible for the sharing of Nigeria's know-how and expertise with other African, Caribbean and Pacific countries (ACP).

== Early life and education ==
Pius Osunyikanmi was born on 3 August 1971, to the family of Pa Christopher Kehinde Osunyikanmi and Madam Esther Osunyikanmi in Ile Oluji, Ondo State. He graduated from Orere Grammar School, Ile Oluji, Ondo State in 1989. He went on to Ondo State University, now Ekiti State University, obtaining a Bachelor of Science degree in Political Science in 1997.

He held Masters and Doctorate degrees in Political Science from the University of Ibadan in 2001 and Adekunle Ajasin University, Akungba Akoko in 2008 respectively.

== Political career ==
Osunyikanmi was appointed the Special Adviser on International Relations to Nigeria's President Goodluck Ebele Jonathan in 2011 and he served between July 2011 and August 2013.

He was Ondo State Commissioner of Education from June 2010 to July 2011.

As Commissioner of Education, he established and implemented the Education Quality Assurance Agency (EQAA) which addressed the falling standard of education in the state which led him to order the closure of some private schools over poor standards and facilities.

Before serving as Commissioner of education, Osunyikanmi had served as the special adviser to the Governor of Ondo State on Intergovernmental affairs and multilateral relations between March 2009 and June 2010, Special Assistant to the Minister, Federal Ministry of Housing and Urban Development (2005 - 2006), Special Assistant to the Secretary of Government, Ondo State (2003 - 2005) and Special Assistant to the Commissioner of Health, Ondo State (1999 - 2002).

Osunyikanmi was at some point interested in running for the governorship of Ondo state and was among those nominated by a youth group to succeed Olusegun Mimiko but defected from the People's Democratic Party (PDP) to the All Progressives Congress (APC) in 2015 when he could not get Olusegun Mimiko to support his ambition after the latter threw his weight behind his Attorney General and Commissioner for Justice, Eyitayo Jegede to succeed him as Governor.

Shortly before his defection from the PDP, he had publicly disowned Olusegun Mimiko who he served under as Commissioner for Education, Special Adviser On Intergovernmental Affairs and Multilateral relations, and Special Assistant due to political differences.

== Personal life and death ==
Osunkanmi was married to Adebukola, a professor of political science and he had three children. He died at a hospital on 24 October 2026, at the age of 55, following a brief illness.
