= Yoruba Tennis Club =

Social sporting club in Lagos

The Yoruba Tennis Club is a tennis club in Onikan, Lagos Island, Lagos, Nigeria. It is the oldest indigenous social club in Nigeria. The club started on 15 July 1926, as Orelodun Tennis Club. At several meetings, the Club was later renamed “The Yoruba Tennis Club”. During the inaugural meeting the club's founders did not restrict its membership to those of Yoruba origin alone. but ensured that it has a wide variety of people from different walks of life.

The Yoruba Tennis Club is currently chaired by Bro. (Chief) Olakunke Bomo Agbebi SAN.

In September 2024, it marked its 98th anniversary

== Founding members ==
The first Chairman, Mr. V. Ade Allen, a notable social figure of his days led the Club through the early period and was the Chairman for eleven years.

- F. Ade Adeniji
- V. Ade Allen
- Y. St. Ariori
- H. M. Balogun
- L. Duro Emanuel
- O. Fagbo D.
- A. Freeman
- J. A. Haastrup
- T. Haniba-Johnson
- H. S. Macaulay
- Frank O.
- Odumosu R.
- A. Randle

== Notable members ==
- Mobolaji Bank Anthony
- Ademola Rasaq Seriki
