= Oremi Evans =

Dame Oremi Evans, DBE (née Bank Anthony; born 7 October 1956) is a Nigerian-born British educator.

== Biography ==
Evans was born on 7 October 1956 in Lagos, Nigeria, the daughter of Sir Mobolaji Bank Anthony (or Bank-Anthony), KBE, and Suzy Iseli, née Gray. She was educated at Queen's College, Lagos, before completing a Bachelor of Education degree at Avery Hill Higher Education College and, later, a Master of Science degree at the University of Worcester.

In 1979, she married Clifford Evans. In the same year she became a science teacher, before working as a Special Educational Needs Coordinator from 1989 to 1994. She was Deputy Headteacher at Whitecross Hereford High School from then until 1999, when she became Headteacher at the John Venn Unit in Hereford. In 2001, she became Headteacher of Brookfield School, before leaving in 2016 to become Executive Headteacher of the Hereford Integrated Behaviour Outreach Service. In 2015, she was appointed a Dame Commander of the Order of the British Empire (DBE).
