= Ile Oluji-Okeigbo =

Ile Oluji/Okeigbo
- LGA
- Nickname: Little Jerusalem
- Interactive map of Ile Oluji/Okeigbo
- Yoruba: Nigeria
- State: Ondo State
- Headquarter: Ile Oluji

Government
  - Type: Monarchy
- Time zone: UTC+1 (WAT)
- Postal code: 351

Ile Oluji-Okeigbo is a town and Local Government Area in Ondo State, Nigeria. Its headquarters are in the town of Ile Oluji.

The postal code of the area is 351.

== Background ==
Ile-Oluji is a town in Ondo State, Nigeria. The town serves as the headquarters of Ile-Oluji Okeigbo Local Government. The indigenes are Yoruba people whose progenitor was the legendary Oduduwa. The monarch of the kingdom is known as the Jegun of Ile-Oluji. Its present monarch is HRM Oba (Dr) Oluwole Olufaderin Adetimehin, FIIN, FCIB, Jimoko II, a former President of the Chartered Insurance Institute of Nigeria who was crowned on 10 June 2016

== Economy ==
Ile-Oluji is an agrarian town. It is one of the largest producers and exporters of cocoa production in Nigeria. cassava, yam, maize and oil Palm are other major crops cultivated by farmers in the town. The major manufacturing company in the town is Premium Cocoa Products (Ile-Oluji) Limited. It has one of the largest cocoa processing companies in West Africa. Its products comprise cocoa powder, cocoa cake, cocoa butter and chocolate liquor which are sold to industrial customers. Some of its customers are Promasidor Nigeria, Nestle, Fan Milk, Indcresa Productos Del Cacao in Spain and Theobroma B.V in the Netherlands. Oluji Pure Cocoa Powder is also a famous consumer product from the company.

== Education ==
The Federal Polytechnic, Ile-Oluji is a major tertiary institution in the town. The Asiwaju Bola Tinubu Skills Acquisition Centre, built by the Federal Government of Nigeria is also located in Ile-Oluji. Gboluji Grammar School, Ile-Oluji is one of the one hundred oldest secondary schools in Nigeria. Other secondary schools in the town include Holy Saviour's High School, Orere Grammar School, Baptist High School, CAC Grammar School, St. Francis College, Gloryfield International College, New Era High School and Akinyosoye Model College.

== Religion ==
Ile-Oluji Okeigbo has a predominant Christian population. The major Churches include the Cathedral of St. Peter, Ile-Oluji (Church of Nigeria, Anglican Communion), St. Luke's Anglican Church, Emmanuel Anglican Church, Redeemed Christian Church of God, Gloryland Provincial Headquarters, Araromi Baptist Church, Christ Apostolic Church, Cherubim and Seraphim (Nigerian church), Celestial Church of Christ, St. George's Catholic Church and Christ Apostolic church Temiasese

== Climate ==
Ile-Oluji Okeigbo experiences humid tropical savanna conditions with a well-defined rainy season lasting from April to October. Rainfall peaks mid-year, while the dry season is warm and marked by lower humidity.

== Notable people ==
The following notable people were born in, lived in, are currently living in or associated with Ile-Oluji.

- Chief Henry Fajemirokun, CON. Businessman and industrialist. Former President, Nigerian Association of Chambers of Commerce, Industry, Mines and Agriculture NACCIMA.
- Chief Oladele Fajemirokun - Businessman and philanthropist
- Dr. Samuel Adesuyi - Nigeria's Chief Medical Adviser (1969 -1976). For his contributions to medical services, the West African Health Community created the Dr. Samuel Adesuyi Award and Medal given to outstanding medical doctors in the sub-region.
- Chief Akinsola Akinfemiwa, OON - Former Managing Director, Skye Bank Plc.
- Dr. Pius Olakunle Osunyikanmi - Director General, Directorate of Technical Aids Corps of Nigeria.
- Professor Adebukola Foluke Adesuyi- Professor of Political Science
- Ms Funke Opeke - Electrical Engineer and Founder, Main One Cable Company.
- Senator Nicholas Tofowomo - Senator at the 9th National Assembly
- Honourable Janet Febisola Adeyemi- Member, House of Representatives 1999 - 2003.
- Late Professor Akin Akindoyeni , OFR - Pioneer Vice-Chancellor, Adekunle Ajasin University, Akungba.
- Mr. Wale Akinterinwa - three-term Commissioner for Finance, Ondo State.
- Professor Bola Akinterinwa - Former Director General, Nigerian Institute of International Affairs,
- Professor Francis Afolabi Fajemirokun - Professor Emeritus of Surveying.
- Professor Adeduro Adegeye - Professor of Agricultural Economics
- Chief Bayo Akinbisehin, SAN - Legal Practitioner and Politician)
- Professor Robert Akinbowale Ogunsusi - Professor of Veterinary Medicine, Founding Provost of The Polytechnic-Ile-Oluji, Former Deputy Vice-Chancellor and Acting Vice-Chancellor, Federal University of Technology Akure
- Mrs. Adejoke Orelope-Adefulire- Former Deputy Governor of Lagos State (2011 -2015)
- Professor Ayo Ogunsheye - Professor of Adult Education, President, Lagos Chamber of Commerce and Industry from 1983 to 1987.
- Professor Adetoun Ogunseye - Professor of Library Science; first female Professor in Nigeria
- Prof TAM Awoniyi - Professor of Animal Production and Health. Federal University of Technology Akure.
- Mr Sam Adegboyega - Oil and Gas Mogul, MD SOWSCo Nigeria
- Professor Anjuwon Akinwande - Professor of Mass communication
