= National Orthopaedic Hospital, Igbobi =

Hospital in Lagos, Nigeria

National Orthopaedic Hospital
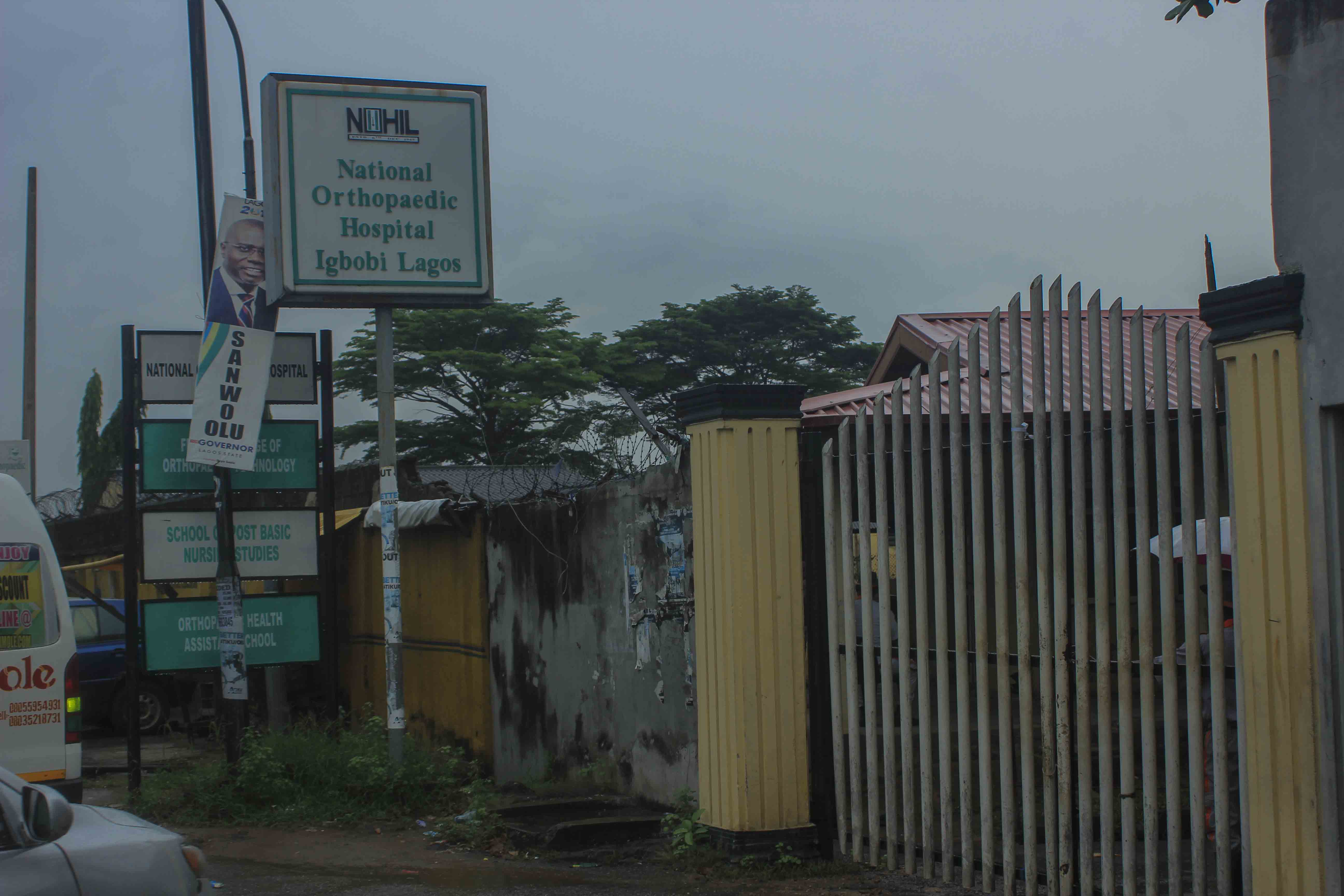

Geography
- Location: Igbobi, Lagos, Nigeria

Organisation
- Type: Specialist

Services
- Emergency department: Yes
- Beds: 450
- Speciality: Orthopaedic Surgery

History
- Founded: 1945

Links
- Website: www.nohlagos.ng

The National Orthopaedic Hospital, Igbobi, Lagos (NOHIL), is a hospital in Lagos, Nigeria. It is colloquially referred to simply as "Igbobi" or "Igbobi hospital".

In 2019, the hospital partnered with SIGN Fracture Care International, US to tackle limb deformity.

== History ==
The National Orthopaedic Hospital, Igbobi, Lagos commenced operations as a rehabilitation centre for wounded soldiers during World War II in 1943, after which it developed to a hospital under the British Colonial Medical services of Colonial Nigeria in 6 December 1945. The hospital, initially named the Royal Orthopaedic Hospital in 1956 was also instrumental in treating wounded soldiers and civilians of the Nigerian Civil War of 1967-1970. The hospital was handed over to the Lagos State Government in 1975 and subsequently the Federal Government in 1979.

== Healthcare ==
The hospital has a staff strength of about 1300. It has an intensive care unit and a 450-bed capacity. The hospital is now reputed to be the largest orthopaedic hospital in West Africa. Mobolaji Bank Anthony funded a new section of the hospital which included the rehabilitation of the emergency ward.

The hospital has the following under listed departments to cater for patients needs

The amenity ward in NOHIL which is the private section of the hospital was commissioned on April 1, 2021 by the then Minister of State for Health, Dr Olorunnibe Mamora. It was built with equipment specifically for premium care. Also on the same day, Modular Theatre with six suites was also commissioned.

In 2022, a modern molecular laboratory was opened at the hospital to tackle diseases such as COVID-19 and carry out tests such as PCR.

=== Donation ===
In March 2025 wheel chairs were donated to the hospital in commemoration of the World Wheel Chair Day, and to aid persons with mobility challenge in the hospital.

== Departments ==
- Orthopaedic & Trauma
- Emergency Medical Services
- Burns & Plastic
- Medical Social Services
- TSERS
- Anaesthesia & ICU
- Staff Medical Services
- NURSING
- Administration
- Pharmacy
- Pathology
- Physiotherapy
- Linen Services
- Health Records
- Prothetics and Orthotics
- Radiology
- Store & Supply
- Internal Audit
- Works and Services
- Speech Therapy
- Account
- Procurement
- Information Technology
- Dietetics
- Occupational Therapy
