= Cocoa production in Nigeria =

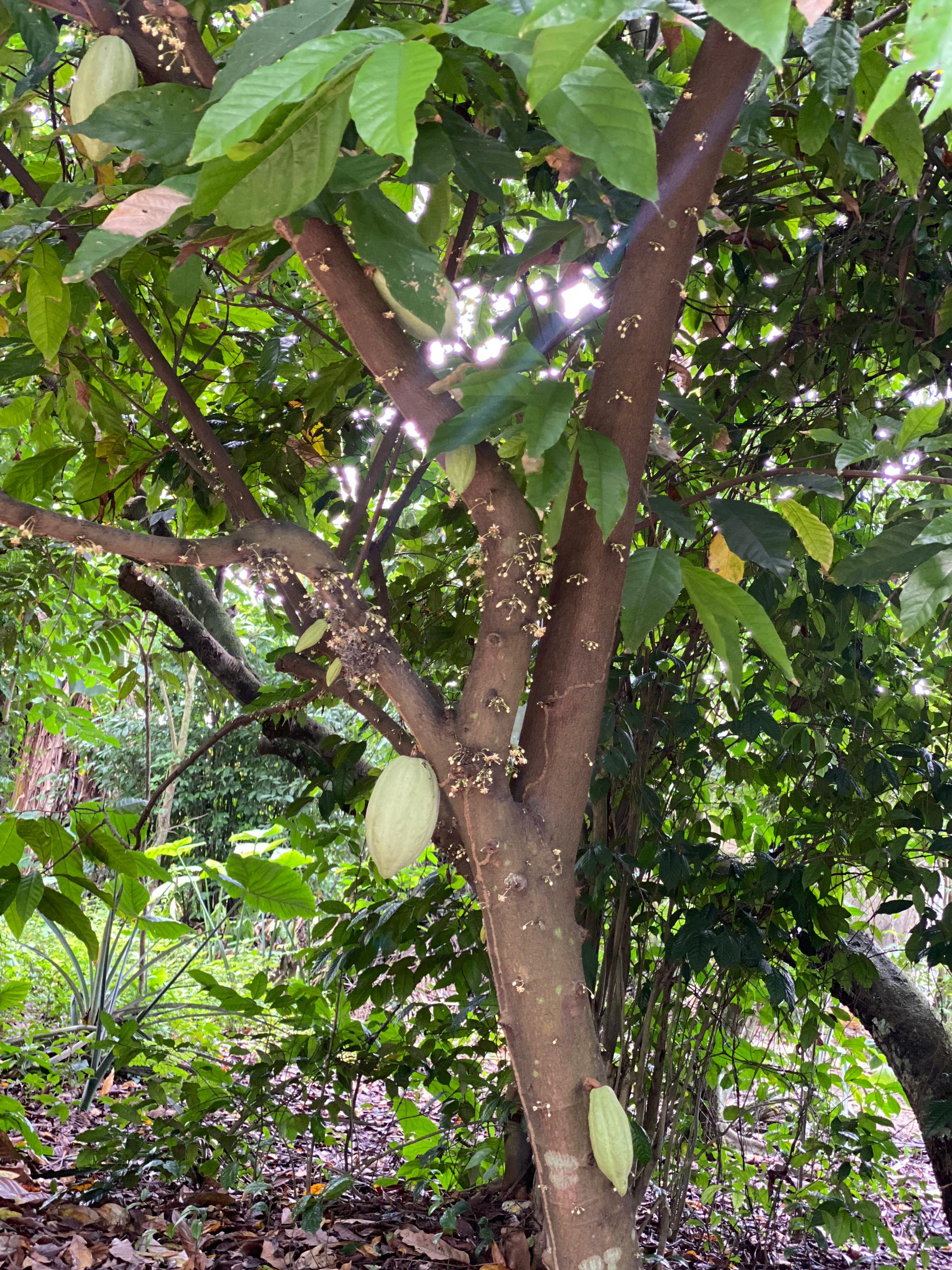
A cocoa tree (Theobroma cacao) in Nigeria

Cocoa production is important to the economy of Nigeria. Cocoa is the leading agricultural export of the country and Nigeria is currently the world's fourth largest producer of cocoa, after Ivory Coast, Indonesia and Ghana, and the third largest exporter, after Ivory Coast and Ghana. The crop was a major foreign exchange earner for Nigeria in the 1950s and 1960s and in 1970 the country was the second largest producer in the world but following investments in the oil sector in the 1970s and 1980s, Nigeria's share of world output declined. In 2010, cocoa production accounted for only 0.3% of agricultural GDP. Average cocoa beans production in Nigeria between 2000 and 2010 was 389,272 tonnes per year rising from 170,000 tonnes produced in 1999.

== History ==
The earliest cocoa farms in Nigeria were in Bonny and Calabar in the 1870s but the area proved not suitable for cultivation. In 1880, a cocoa farm was established in Lagos and later, a few more farms were established in Agege and Ota. From the farms in Agege and Ota information disseminated to the Yoruba hinterland about cocoa farming, thereafter, planting of the tree expanded in Western Nigeria. Farmers in Ibadan and Egba land began experimenting with planting cocoa in uncultivated forests in 1890 and those in Ilesha started around 1896. The planting of cocoa later spread to Okeigbo and Ondo Town both in Ondo State, Ife and Gbongan in Osun State and also in Ekiti land. Before 1950, there were two main varieties of cocoa planted in Nigeria. The major one was Amelonado cacao which was imported from the upper Amazon river Basin in Brazil. The second was a heterogeneous strain from Trinidad. The Amelonado pods are green but turning yellow when ripe but the Trinidad variety is red.

== Cultivation and trade ==
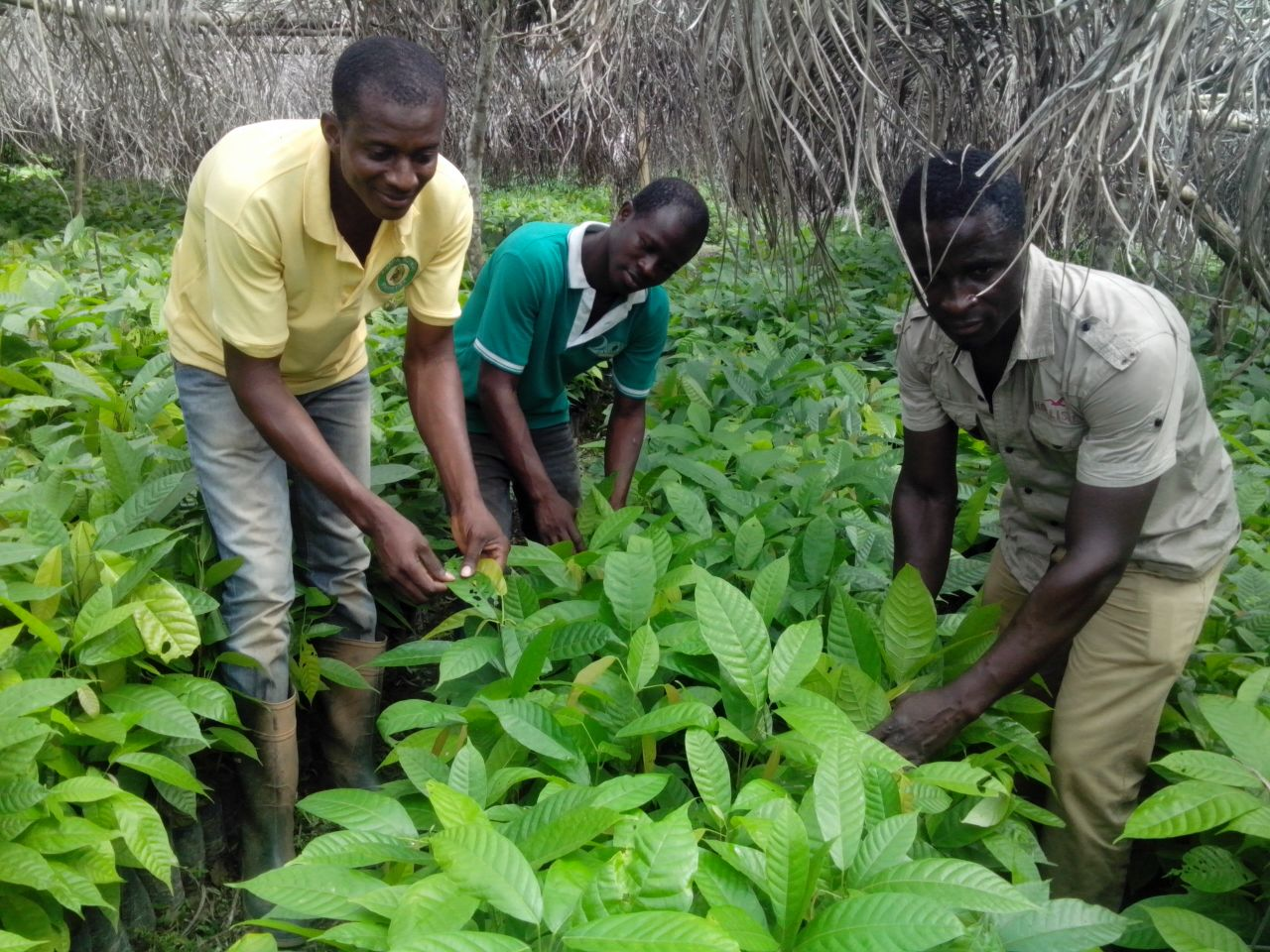
Workers at a cocoa nursery

Cocoa flourishes in areas that are not more than 20 degrees north or south of the equator. The trees respond well in regions with high temperature and distributed rainfall. In Nigeria, the cocoa tree is grown from seedlings which are raised in nurseries, when the seedlings reach a height of 3 cm they are transplanted at a distance of 3 to 4 metres. The cultivation of cocoa is done by many smallscale farmers on farmlands of around 2 hectares while export is dominated by a few firms.

The major states that produce cocoa are Ondo, Cross River, Ogun, Akwa Ibom, Ekiti, Delta, Osun and Oyo.

Historically Nigeria's cocoa production was marketed through a monopsony by marketing boards created by the government. In the 1980s the World Bank and the International Monetary Fund advised Nigeria to liberalise the sector because the marketing boards were ineffective. In 1986, Nigeria dissolved the marketing boards and liberalised cocoa marketing and trade. However, trade has not yielded the anticipated results, in addition, ageing trees and farms, low yields, inconsistent production patterns, disease incidence, pest attack and little agricultural mechanisation has contributed to a stagnant cocoa industry. Currently, farmers sell their products indirectly through a cooperative or a licensed buying agent who in turn sell it to exporting firms.

== Threats and challenges ==
Cocoa production in Nigeria faces a series of escalating threats that have significantly impacted farmers and output. Economic, environmental, and security-related issues that intensified in the 2010s and 2020s have contributed to major instability in the sector.

Experts warn that if these challenges persist, Nigeria's cocoa industry may suffer long-term decline, contributing to the ongoing global cocoa shortage. Farmers have expressed concerns that continued insecurity and financial instability may force them to abandon cocoa farming altogether, exacerbating the economic struggles of rural communities dependent on cocoa.

=== Economic and environmental challenges ===
For Nigerian farmers, climate change has led to unpredictable rainfall patterns, prolonged dry spells, and increased incidences of pests and diseases affecting cocoa trees. These factors have contributed to reduced yields and lower-quality beans.

Additionally, rising costs of fertilizers and pesticides amid the economic crisis of the mid-2020s have made it increasingly difficult for farmers to maintain their crops. Many farmers, particularly small-scale producers, struggle to afford the necessary agricultural inputs, further reducing their productivity.

=== Poor infrastructure and government neglect ===
Poor infrastructure has further hindered cocoa production as many cocoa-growing communities suffer from deteriorating roads, making it difficult for farmers to transport their produce to markets. Cocoa traders have also raised concerns about how the neglected road networks have made them easy targets for bandits and other criminals, who exploit the poor road conditions to stage ambushes.

Government response to these challenges has been minimal. As of 2024, local authorities in cocoa-producing regions continue to cite funding shortages for the lack of infrastructure or security. While police officials have promised to reallocate personnel from VIP protection to tackle rural insecurity, there has been little evidence of change on the ground.

=== Theft and insecurity ===
One of the most pressing concerns for cocoa farmers in Nigeria is the increasing prevalence of theft. Farmers in rural communities, have reported a surge in cocoa pod theft, particularly following the rise in global cocoa prices in the early 2020s. Before the rise in cocoa prices, it was common practice for farmers to leave harvested pods in their fields to ferment before drying. However, due to the rampant theft, many farmers now only harvest what they can immediately transport home.

Reports indicate that both armed and unarmed thieves are targeting cocoa farms, leading to significant financial losses for farmers. In some cases, thieves have infiltrated farms by posing as labourers, returning after work hours to steal the produce. The situation has been particularly dire for women farmers, including widows who rely on cocoa farming for economic stability.

Security concerns in cocoa-producing areas have also escalated into violent encounters. In 2023 and 2024, multiple incidents were recorded in which farmers were physically assaulted or even killed while trying to protect their crops. The lack of a formal security presence in many rural cocoa-producing areas has compounded the crisis. Rural villagers in Ife South have resorted to self-policing through local vigilante groups. However, this system remains inadequate, as captured criminals must be transported hours away to the nearest police outpost. Despite repeated appeals, the government has yet to deploy police personnel to the community, leaving farmers vulnerable to continued attacks.
