= Janet Febisola Adeyemi =

President of Women in Mining in Nigeria

Janet F. Adeyemi

Executive Board Member of Infrastructure Concession Regulatory Commission
- In office 2013–2015

Senior Special Assistant to the President on National Assembly Matters
- In office 2006–2007

Chairman, Cocoa Processing Industry Ondo State
- In office 2003–2006

National House of Representatives for Ondo State
- In office May 1999 – May 2003

Personal details
- Born: 16 July 1958 (age 68) Ondo State, Nigeria
- Party: All Progressives Congress
- Education: Loughborough University University of Ife
- Occupation: Civil engineer, geologist
- Website: http://www.wimng.org

Janet Febisola Adeyemi (born July 16, 1958) is the current President of Women in Mining in Nigeria, an affiliate of International Women in Mining. She also served on the Strategic Development and Policy Implementation Committee of the 2016 Governor-elect of Ondo State. She is part of a broad civil society network coordinating an intervention in the recent South Kaduna crisis. She notably served in Nigeria national House of Representatives, Executive Board Member of ICRC, Senior Special Assistant to the Presidency on National Assembly Matters, Chairman of Ondo State Cocoa Industry, amongst other advisory committees and national developmental agendas.

During her term in the National Assembly, she served as chairman on Irrigation, Flood and Erosion Control, sub-committee Chairman for Solid Minerals and Water Resources. She sponsored/co-sponsored 15 bills enacted as law amongst several other initiative bills despite serving as a member of a minority political party. She declared her intention to run for senator of Ondo South District under All Progressives Congress (APC) on 17 September 2018.

== Early life and family ==
Janet Adeyemi was born to Chief Ebenezer Akinboboye Adepoju and High Chief (Princess) Florence Motinola Adepoju, known by her title as Yagbata of Ile oluji, Ondo State. Her father, Chief Adepoju was a civil servant that supervised the execution of part of the major road that connects around Ile Oluji. Her mother, High Chief Adepoju, was a successful tradeswoman who came from an impoverished background and became one of the wealthiest merchants in her town. Adeyemi's uncle, Oba (Engr.) Stephen Sulade Adedugbe was the immediate late King of Ile-Oluji - a very influential Monarch in SouthWest Nigeria, the Jegun of Ile-Oluji.

She grew up in Jos during the civil war, and her family was almost executed during the raids. Her neighbor had provided a saving grace which enabled them to flee out of the state back to their state of origin.

Adeyemi went on to attend Obafemi Awolowo University, Ile-Ife for her undergraduate degree in geology. Upon graduating, she served in the National Youth Service Corps programme as a pupil geologist. She and her would-be husband (Engr. T.A.T. Adeyemi) were recipients of the Commonwealth and European Economic Commission scholarships respectively which sponsored them to Loughborough University of Technology, UK.

== Federal House of Representatives (Nigeria) ==
Adeyemi was elected to the House of Representative for Ile-oluji/Oke-igbo constituency in 1998. She served as author of several bills and worked across party lines on multiple occasions.

She advocated for Developmental agendas and Gender Equality; she sponsored the Circumcision of Women (Prohibition) Bill in 2000 which attracted many Western Scholars that led to the supervision of a doctorate thesis by a Canadian Scholar. Internally, Adeyemi co-sponsored the creation of the Niger-Delta Commission, an agency established to address the gross underdevelopment of the oil producing area in Nigeria. She was one of the advocates for the Nigeria $18 Billion external debt relief; she served as a delegate to address USA Senators at the World Trade Center in New York to draw on the merits of the debt forgiveness package.

== Public service appointments ==
Adeyemi has served at various capacities including executive board member of the ICRC, Special Assistant to the Presidency on National Assembly Matters, Chairman of Ondo State Cocoa Industry. She was considered amongst the finalists for deputy governorship for the APC candidate in the 2016 Ondo State Gubernatorial Contest. She was part of the transition team for Governor Olusegun Agagu after helping to win the gubernatorial election in 2003 and delivering her constituency in a landslide victory.

== Affiliations ==
Adeyemi serves on the boards of several non-governmental organizations, as a consultant to many bilateral and multi-lateral developmental organizations including World Bank and the United Nations, as well as many Statewide committee developmental initiatives. She has organized several environmental-issue led workshops/conferences sponsored by Federal Environmental Protection Agency (FEPA), United Nations Industrial Development Organization (UNIDO), United Nation Development Program (UNDP), Federal Ministry of Environment, amongst many others.

She served on the committee for the creation of Nigeria Delta Development Commission (NDDC); planning committee on the flooding of River Niger; committee on the development of Water Resources Management and Production of a draft bill on the conjunctive use of water in Nigeria; committee on security of lives and property (in curbing the effects of armed bandits from the Niger Republic); committee member on Police Equipment Trust Fund; committee member of Issue of Climate Change; Small Hydropower Project Implementation in Nigeria; Advocacy for Gender Parity in Nigeria; United Nations National Consultative Group on Electoral Reforms in Nigeria; Affirmation Action Committee of the Federal Ministry of Women Affairs.

== Awards ==
In recognition of her contributions to state and country, Adeyemi is a recipient of the following awards:

- National Delegate at 2017 United Nation Commission on the Status of Women
- Fellow of Nigerian Mining and Geosciences Society
- Political Achievers Award, organized by Movement for Political Awareness and Mass Emancipation
- Outstanding Female Legislative Award, organized by National Council for Women Society
- PSN Gold Award for best Female Legislator
- Inner-Wheel Merit Award for Selfless Service to Womanhood and the Nation
- Merit Award by Cocoa Association of Nigeria
- Nigerian Women's Pride Merit Award by Niger Wives Association of Australia
- Prime International Corporate Development in Nigeria Merit 2002 Award
- Merit Award by the Nigerian Association of Geosciences and Mining Students UNIJOS & FUTA Chapters
- Female Parliamentarian Award for Africa – CAFS 5th Anniversary 2002
- Rare Gems 2002 Award, organized by UNFPA, UNIFEM & WODEF
- Honorary Doctorate Degree from Columbus International University and West African Merit Award Council on 28 September 2002
- Ile-Oluji National Women of Ile-Oluji students merit Award
- Global Rights Award in recognition of outstanding contribution to women issues
- National Union of Market Women Association Award for outstanding contributor to gender issues 2002

== Speaking engagements and publications ==
Adeyemi has made several public presentations and issued numerous publications. Below are some of her most recent undertakings:

- Speaker at WIMBIZ's flagship Annual Conference on Mining
- Speaker at Nigeria Mining Week 2016
- Adeyemi J.F – Role of House Committee, Consultants and Legislative Aides in the process of law-making (Seminar Paper, Retreat for House of Representatives- August 2004)
- Adeyemi J.F – Institutional Framework for the Development of Bitumen in Nigeria (Seminar Paper 2000)
- Adeyemi J.F. – Democracy and Modern Civilization.
- Adeyemi, J.F. - Quantitative evaluation of factors affecting water erosion in Nigeria (Seminar Paper)
- Adeyemi, J.F. solid waste management – landfill and its management problems (seminar paper presented at the international conference organized by committee on environment)
