= National Water Resources Institute =

Nigerian research institution

National Water Resources Institute is the Nigerian research institution responsible for the training of water resources engineers and research on different issues in the water sector. The national research institute is situated in Kaduna State, Nigeria.

== Background ==
The institute was established under the National Water Resources Institute Act, Cap N83 LFN 2004. Professor Emmanuel Adanu has been the Director General of the Institute from 2015. His tenure will end in 2025. In 2018, a three-member committee was set up by the Minister for Water Resources, Suleiman Hussein Adamu, to assess the effects of flood in Jigawa State.

In 2019, the Nigerian Defence Academy signed an MOU with the National Water Resources Institute for an exchange of scholars and joint research on water resources and its various applications.

In 2021, WaterAid partnered with the National Water Resources Institute for training and sanitation programs in the country.

== Courses ==
The accredited courses offered by the institute are:

- Certificate course - Water Resources Engineering Technology
- National Diploma(ND) - Water Resources Engineering Technology
- Higher National Diploma (HND) - Water Resources Engineering Technology
- Advanced Diploma - Hydro-geology

== See also ==
- National Water Research Institute
