= Nigerian-American Chamber =

NGO for business between Nigera and U.S.

Nigerian-American Chamber of Commerce is a non-profit and non-governmental organization. The chamber was the first to pioneer bilateral chamber of commerce in Nigeria. It was created in 1960 to foster bilateral relations between United States and Nigeria, with offices in Nigeria, Texas and Atlanta. Wofai Samuel served as Acting Director-General from 2022 to 2025. According to the Guardian report, Nigeria has become the largest trading partners in sub-Saharan Africa.

== Activities ==
As part of the activities of the chamber, it has played a vital and important role in the advancement of United States-Nigeria trade and investment relations by bringing together key business partners from both countries and serving as a catalyst to improve existing commercial ties. The Chamber has created value for its members in the area of business-to-business relationships. Other services offered to members include: organization of seminars, workshops, training, and trade missions.This gives members and non-members a platform for the discussion of different issues affecting the economy in general.
